= Cardiff Philharmonic Orchestra =

Orchestra based in Cardiff, Wales

The Cardiff Philharmonic Orchestra (CPO) is an amateur philharmonic orchestra based in Cardiff, Wales. The CPO played its first concert in 1982 and subsequently played over 250 concerts, primarily in Wales but also in England, Switzerland, and France. The CPO has a wide repertoire and appears regularly at Wales' premier concert hall, St. David's Hall.

The conductor since inception is Michael Bell.

== History ==
=== St David's Cathedral ===
The CPO performed its inaugural concert at St David's Cathedral, Cardiff on Saturday 19 June 1982. Initially the orchestra intended to perform a single concert and donate the proceeds to South Glamorgan Community Welfare Trust, a charitable organisation that had agreed to sponsor the concert. However the CPO continued to flourish with members from throughout South Wales.

=== St David's Hall ===
The CPO is recognized as one of Wales's foremost non-professional orchestras, with a reputation for a wide-ranging repertoire from film music and light classics to major works usually considered outside the remit or capabilities of an amateur orchestra. These include the first Cardiff performances of Mahler's Third and Sixth Symphonies (at Llandaff Cathedral in June 1984 and June 1985 respectively) and two performances of Stravinsky's The Rite of Spring at St David's Hall, Cardiff (in March 1990 and November 1996).

On 20 June 2008 the CPO undertook what was the orchestra's most ambitious project to date with a performance of Mahler's Symphony No. 2 at St David's Hall. An orchestra of 116 players, a chorus of 250 singers from South Wales, Bristol, Brittany and Paris, joined soloists Ros Evans (soprano) and Kate Woolveridge (mezzo-soprano) to give an acclaimed performance of this work.

Other major symphonic works performed by CPO include Richard Strauss's An Alpine Symphony and Don Juan; Mahler's Symphonies 1 & 5; Rachmaninov's Symphony No 2; Bruckner's Symphonies 4 and 8; Vaughan Williams's A London Symphony; Shostakovich's Symphonies 5 and 7 (Leningrad); Sir Arthur Bliss's complete ballet score, Checkmate (Welsh premiere 1985) and Berlioz's Symphonie fantastique. In addition, Cardiff Philharmonic Orchestra performed all four symphonies by Brahms as well as symphonies by Beethoven, Tchaikovsky, Schumann, Borodin, Saint-Saëns, and Sibelius.

Cardiff Philharmonic Orchestra appeared at the annual Cardiff Festival of Music from 1987 to the Festival's final season in 1995. In the 1994 Festival, CPO commissioned a work from composer Lynne Plowman. The resulting work, Blue, was premiered by CPO at Llandaff Cathedral, and was subsequently performed by the BBC National Orchestra of Wales.

On Easter 1996 CPO undertook its first overseas visit with a three-concert tour of Switzerland, followed by a tour of France in 1998 that culminated with a concert at the Salle Pleyel. ITV Wales broadcast a documentary of this tour in July 1998.

In June 2000 Cardiff Philharmonic Orchestra was invited to return to Paris to perform the final performance of the British Millennium Festival. The concert, at Eglise de la Madeline (where Faure's Requiem was first performed), was attended by the British Ambassador and included performances of works by Bach/Stokowski, Faure, Saint-Saëns and Elgar's Symphony No 1.

In July 2007 CPO returned to Cardiff's twin city of Nantes, performing two concerts that featured Cardiff-born violinist Sara Trickey in Mendelssohn's Violin Concerto in E minor.

In July 2000 Cardiff Philharmonic Orchestra was invited to perform in the Welsh Proms in Cardiff, and performed in each subsequent Welsh Proms season with guest presenters such as Brian Blessed, Sarah Jane Honeywell, Aled Jones, and Dave Benson Phillips. In July 2006 the Children's Prom was a bilingual event with narration by Kirsten O'Brien and Branwen Gwyn. The concert was broadcast on S4C.

Since 1997 Cardiff Philharmonic Orchestra has accompanied the finalists in the television broadcast of the biannual Texaco Young Musician of Wales Competition, and in 2000 Texaco became Cardiff Philharmonic Orchestra's sponsor, an association that began with the release of the orchestra's CD, A Night at the Movies.

Cardiff Philharmonic Orchestra was the first non-professional orchestra to perform at St David's Hall, Cardiff in 1983. CPO appears regularly at St David's Hall and since 1998 has performed an annual series of concerts of popular classics and film music.

Soloists with whom CPO has performed at St David's Hall include Sir Geraint Evans, Bryn Terfel, Charlotte Church, Bonnie Tyler and pianist Martin Jones.

Other venues in South Wales at which Cardiff Philharmonic Orchestra has performed include Llandaff Cathedral, Blackwood Miners Institute, Brecon Cathedral, Maesteg Town Hall, Grand Pavilion, Porthcawl, Folly Farm Theatre and the Gwyn Hall, Neath.

== Wales Millennium Centre ==
In March 2006 CPO made its debut at the Wales Millennium Centre with a programme that included a performance of Karl Jenkins’ The Armed Man, conducted by the composer. The orchestra was joined on that occasion by Cor Caerdydd and a distinguished array of soloists including leading British cellist Paul Watkins.

In October 2006 performances by Cardiff Philharmonic Orchestra were broadcast on BBC Radio 3 as part of the BBC's Listen Up! Festival.

Paul Lewis led Cardiff Philharmonic Orchestra for 24 years until October 2006. He was succeeded as leader of the orchestra by Claire Frankcom and the present leader of the orchestra is Jill Francis-Williams.
