= Violin Concerto (Korngold) =

Concerto by Erich Wolfgang Korngold

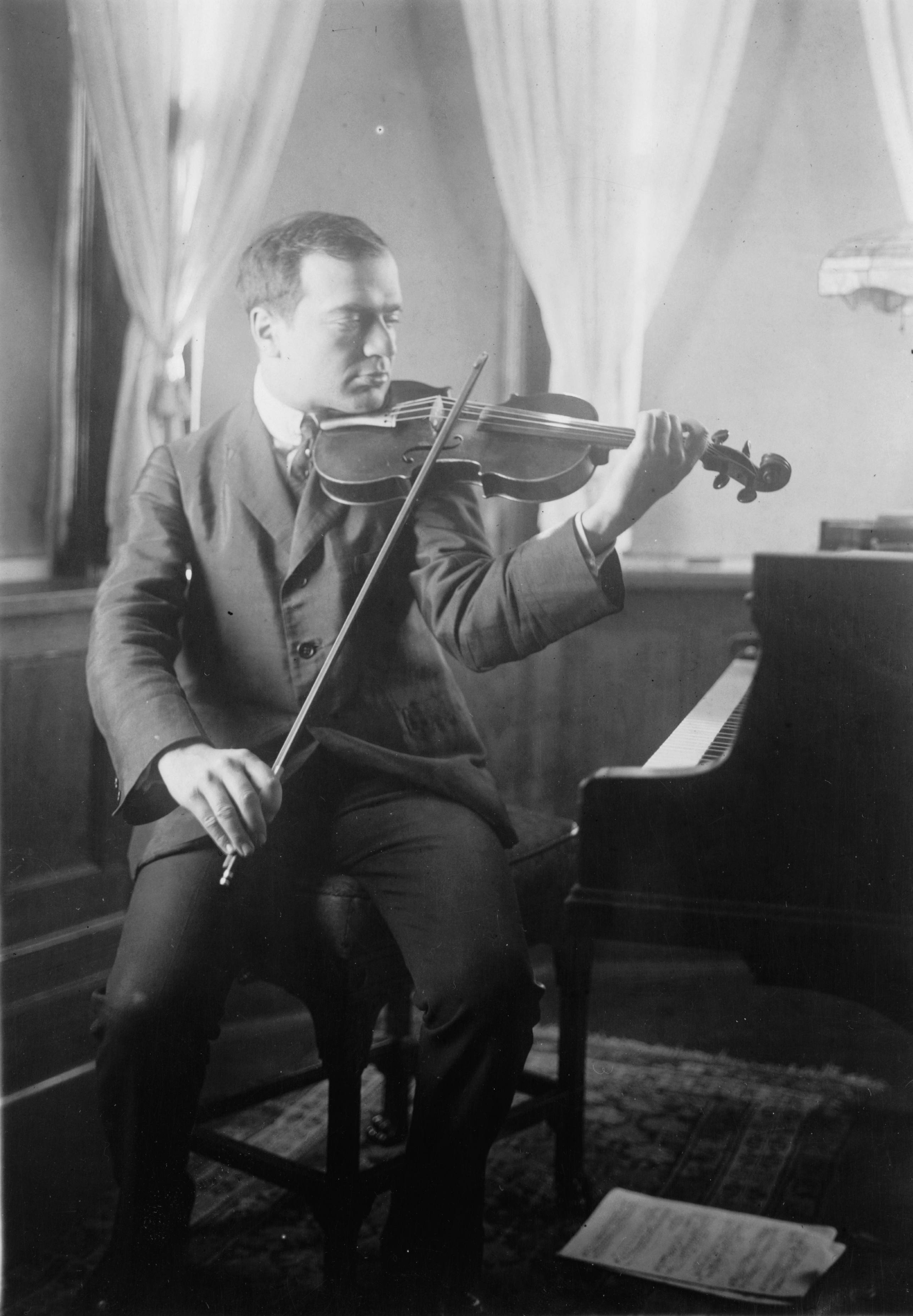
Bronislaw Huberman, who persuaded Korngold to write his Violin Concerto.

Erich Wolfgang Korngold composed his Violin Concerto in D major, Op. 35, in 1945. A typical performance lasts about 25 minutes.

== Overview ==
Korngold had vowed to give up composing anything other than film music, with which he supported himself and his family, until Hitler had been defeated. With the end of World War II, he retired from films to concentrate on music for the concert hall. The Violin Concerto was the first such work that Korngold wrote, following some initial persuasion from the violinist and fellow émigré Bronisław Huberman. Korngold had been hurt by the assumption that a successful film composer was one who had sold his integrity to Hollywood, just as earlier he had been hurt by many critics' assumptions that his works were performed only because he was the son of music critic Julius Korngold. He was thus determined to prove himself with a work that combined vitality and superb craftsmanship.

The concerto was dedicated to Alma Mahler, the widow of Korngold's childhood mentor Gustav Mahler. It was premiered on 15 February 1947 by Jascha Heifetz and the St. Louis Symphony under conductor Vladimir Golschmann. It received the most enthusiastic ovation in St. Louis concert history. On 30 March 1947, Heifetz played the concerto in Carnegie Hall with the New York Philharmonic conducted by Efrem Kurtz; the broadcast performance was recorded on transcription discs. The composer wrote about Heifetz's playing of the work:

In spite of the demand for virtuosity in the finale, the work with its many melodic and lyric episodes was contemplated more for a Caruso than for a Paganini. It is needless to say how delighted I am to have my concerto performed by Caruso and Paganini in one person: Jascha Heifetz. (Note: As Quoted in Steinberg, 218)

Heifetz's performance launched the work into the standard repertoire, and it quickly became Korngold's most popular piece. However, the fame of the violin concerto, combined with Korngold's eminent association with Hollywood film music, has helped obscure the rest of his legacy as a composer of concert-hall works written before and after his arrival in the United States.

Although Korngold was credited with introducing the sophisticated musical language of his classical training to the soundscapes of Hollywood films, a kind of reverse inspiration also occurred. Like many of Korngold's "serious" works in traditional genres, the violin concerto borrows thematic material from his movie scores in each of its three movements.

== Music ==
The work is scored for solo violin, two flutes (one doubling piccolo), two oboes (one doubling cor anglais), two clarinets, bass clarinet, two bassoons (one doubling contrabassoon), four horns, two trumpets, trombone, harp, strings, and a colorful percussion section of timpani, bass drum, cymbals, gong, tubular bell, glockenspiel, vibraphone, xylophone, and celesta.

The three movements are:

1. Moderato nobile
2. Romance
3. Allegro assai vivace

The violin solo which opens the concerto is a theme from Another Dawn (1937), running over two octaves in five notes. Juarez (1939) provided the second theme (the Maximilian & Carlotta theme), more expansive and reliant upon the orchestra.

In the second movement, the solo violin introduces the principal theme of the slow movement, quoted from Anthony Adverse (1936) and revisited after a contrasting middle section that seems to have been uniquely composed for the concerto.

The third movement, the most demanding movement for the soloist, begins with a staccato jig, which leads to a second theme based like the first on the main motif from The Prince and the Pauper (1937) and builds up to a virtuoso climax.

== Notable recordings ==
- Nigel Armstrong and Neville Marriner with the Colburn Orchestra.
- Kristóf Baráti and Otto Tausk with the South Netherlands Philharmonic.
- Nicola Benedetti and Kirill Karabits with the Bournemouth Symphony Orchestra.
- Renaud Capuçon and Yannick Nézet-Séguin with the Rotterdam Philharmonic Orchestra.
- Miranda Cuckson and Paul Freeman with the Czech National Symphony Orchestra.
- Glenn Dicterow and David Robertson with the New York Philharmonic.
- James Ehnes and Bramwell Tovey with the Vancouver Symphony Orchestra (2006).
- James Ehnes and Alexander Shelley with the National Arts Centre Orchestra (2024 release of 2022 concert).
- Liza Ferschtman and Jiří Malát with the Prague Symphony Orchestra.
- Vilde Frang and James Gaffigan with the Frankfurt Radio Symphony.
- Alexander Gilman and Perry So with the Cape Town Philharmonic Orchestra.
- Vadim Gluzman and Neeme Järvi with the Residentie Orchestra.
- Caroline Goulding and Kevin John Edusei with the Bern Symphony Orchestra.
- Ilya Gringolts and Julien Salemkour with the Copenhagen Philharmonic.
- Andrew Haveron and Jiří Bělohlávek with the BBC Symphony Orchestra.
- Andrew Haveron and John Wilson with the RTÉ Concert Orchestra.
- Jascha Heifetz and Alfred Wallenstein with the Los Angeles Philharmonic. This recording was inducted into the Grammy Hall of Fame.
- Ulf Hoelscher and Willy Mattes with the Stuttgart Radio Symphony Orchestra.
- Daniel Hope and Alexander Shelley with the Royal Stockholm Philharmonic Orchestra.
- Thomas Albertus Irnberger and Doron Salomon with the Israel Philharmonic Orchestra.
- Chantal Juillet and John Mauceri with the Berlin Radio Symphony Orchestra.
- Laurent Korcia and Jean-Jacques Kantorow with the Orchestre Philharmonique de Liège.
- Ji-yoon Lee and Kristiina Poska with the Odense Symphony Orchestra.
- Jack Liebeck and Paul Watkins with the Ulster Orchestra.
- Ulrike-Anima Mathé and Andrew Litton with the Dallas Symphony Orchestra.
- Anne-Sophie Mutter and André Previn with the London Symphony Orchestra.
- František Novotný and Martin Turnovský with the Brno Philharmonic.
- Hyehoon Park and Lawrence Renes with the Bavarian Radio Symphony Orchestra.
- Itzhak Perlman and André Previn with the Pittsburgh Symphony Orchestra.
- Philippe Quint and Carlos Miguel Prieto with the Orquesta Sinfónica de Minería.
- Benjamin Schmid and Seiji Ozawa with the Vienna Philharmonic.
- Gil Shaham and André Previn with the London Symphony Orchestra.
- Baiba Skride and Santtu-Matias Rouvali with the Gothenburg Symphony Orchestra.
- Arabella Steinbacher and Lawrence Foster with the Gulbenkian Orchestra.
- Bojidara Kouzmanova and Nayden Todorov with the Plovdiv Philharmonic Orchestra.
- Matthew Trusler and Yasuo Shinozaki with the Düsseldorf Symphony Orchestra.
- Paul Waltman and David Björkman with the Swedish Radio Symphony Orchestra.
- Vera Tsu and Yu Long with the Razumovsky Sinfonia.
- Nikolaj Znaider and Valery Gergiev with the Vienna Philharmonic.
- Liya Petrova and Duncan Ward with the Royal Philharmonic Orchestra.
