= John Morgan Lloyd =

Welsh musician

John Morgan Lloyd (19 August 1880 – 30 June 1960) was a Welsh musician and minor composer. As a composer, he is best known for his hymn tunes, including "Pro Nostris Liberis", and was a representative of Wales on the committee for the 1927 revision of the Church Hymnary.

He was born at Pentre in the Rhondda Valley, the son of a men's outfitter. His family were founder members of Penuel Welsh Calvinistic Methodist Church, in High Street, Barry, where they lived from 1889; he was playing the organ in the chapel at an early age. He became a pupil at Lewis School, Pengam, and after leaving school worked as his father's assistant. Already in demand as an accompanist, he became accompanist to the Royal Welsh Choir in 1900, and was afterwards selected to study under the composer David Evans at University College, Cardiff. He subsequently became organist of Trinity English Presbyterian Church, Barry.

Military service during the First World War interrupted his musical career, and he eventually gained his B.Mus. and D.Mus. degrees from Trinity College, Dublin, in 1928. At Trinity, he was taught by Charles Herbert Kitson (whose other pupils included Michael Tippett and Arwel Hughes); he was also taught by Arthur Eaglefield Hull He became a lecturer at Cardiff and later succeeded his one-time teacher, David Evans, as professor there. His pupils included Grace Williams, David Wynne and Alun Hoddinott. A John Morgan Lloyd Scholarship is awarded in his name to students of composition; recipients have included Steven Berryman.

His part-song "Arthur yn cyfodi" ("The awakening of Arthur") was written in 1931 to a lyric by R. Silyn Roberts; the better-known composer W. S. Gwynn Williams produced a setting of the poem which is better known. His hymn tunes included "Colwinstone", "Porthkerry", "Nadolig" and "Benediction".

He died in Barry, aged 79, and is buried in Merthyr Dyfan cemetery.
