= Sea Sketches =

Suite for string orchestra by Grace Williams

- Orchestral suite by Grace Williams
- Composed: 1944
- Published: 1951
- Recorded: English Chamber Orchestra; David Atherton; 1970

Premiere
- Date: 31 March 1947
- Conductor: Mansel Thomas
- Performers: BBC Welsh Orchestra

Sea Sketches is a suite of five movements for string orchestra, composed by Grace Williams in 1944, and dedicated to her parents. It is one of the composer's most popular works.

== Composition history ==
Grace Williams composed Sea Sketches in 1944, while living in Hampstead, London. Shortly after completing the work Williams wrote to Gerald Cockshott, in 1945, saying "I don't want to stay in London – I just long to get home and live in comfort by the sea." She returned to her home town of Barry in south Wales, two years later.

The suite was premiered by the BBC Welsh Orchestra conducted by Mansel Thomas in 1947. Since then Sea Sketches has become one of her most popular works, second only to her Fantasia on Welsh Nursery Tunes. and has been performed three times at the BBC Proms.

== Music ==
The suite is composed for string orchestra and comprises five movements depicting various moods of the sea. The movements are:

1. High Wind (Allegro energetico)
2. Sailing Song (Allegretto)
3. Channel Sirens (Lento misterioso)
4. Breakers (Presto)
5. Calm Sea in Summer (Andante tranquillo)

== Publication ==
Sea Sketches was published in 1951 by the Oxford University Press (OUP). It was Williams' first substantial work to be published and the OUP subsequently published a number of her other works. Williams dedicated the suite to her parents "who had the good sense to set up home on the coast of Glamorgan".

== Recordings ==
Sea Sketches was first recorded by the English Chamber Orchestra conducted by David Atherton in 1970 (Decca SXL6468), and re-issued in 1995 (Lyrita SRCD323). It was one of a series of recordings of Williams' works in the 1970s to promote her work, made with the help of the Welsh Arts Council. The work was later recorded by the Manitoba Chamber Orchestra conducted by Roy Goodman (CBC SMCD5227). A new recording was issued by Resonus Classics in 2024, performed by the BBC Philharmonic Orchestra, conducted by John Andrews.
