= Daniel Curtis (composer) =

Welsh composer, singer and musician

Daniel Curtis is a Welsh composer, singer and musician. As a composer, he is best known for his writing within the theatre industry.

== Career ==
In 2014 he composed and produced "A Miner's Song" with Laura Coyne, which featured over 300 performers including; Michael Sheen, Jonathan Pryce, Paul Potts, John Owen-Jones, Matthew Rhys, Aled Jones, Ioan Gruffudd, Joe Calzaghe and voice of Richard Burton. The song was launched before 74,500 people at the Wales v England game on 16 March 2013 in aid of the Welsh National Coal Mining Memorial. Daniel also received National coverage for taking a piano 300 feet underground into Big Pit in Blaenafon, South Wales to perform a concert in tribute to fallen miners.

2014 saw the release of "Love on 42nd Street", in aid of the BBC Children in Need appeal. The album features the acclaimed single "Why Am I Falling" recorded by Ramin Karimloo. The album also includes songs by West End and Broadway stars including; Lea Salonga, Samantha Barks, Sierra Boggess, John Owen-Jones, and Simon Bowman. The album reached number one on the Amazon and iTunes Broadway and Vocal charts in the UK and US. A series of follow-up singles were released with Broadway stars Laura Osnes, Cheyenne Jackson, Lisa O'Hare, Adam Pascal, Chris McCarrell and Katie Rose Clarke. All the singles topped the iTunes Vocal charts in the UK and US.

Daniel held a concert of his work with Laura Coyne at the Royal Albert Hall on 14 October 2014 which featured seventeen West End/Broadway performers including; Alexander Hanson, Rebecca Caine, Charlotte Jaconelli, Cassie Compton and Lucie Jones.

In 2014, Daniel and Laura were made patrons of the Glasgow Philharmonia an orchestra made up of over one hundred young musicians. The orchestra is unique as it was founded and continues to be organised by young musicians. In September 2014, Daniel and Laura were made patrons of The Mencap Music Man Project the project provides daily music sessions for anyone with learning disabilities aged 16 years and above. Daniel and Laura premiered a new song written for the Music Man Project at the London Palladium on 21 June 2015. Daniel and Laura were made ambassadors for the BulliesOut charity in 2017.

On 16 May 2015 Dan and Laura released an unofficial musical concept of the Disney/Pixar movie Ratatouille on YouTube. The concept re-imagines four scenes from the film as a musical. This was followed in 2016 by an unofficial musical concept of the Disney/Pixar movie Brave.

In June 2016 Dan and Laura launched the second Your Voice Competition in aid of Kindred: The Foundation for Adoption. The lead single 'Standing On My Own' was recorded by Glee star Jenna Ushkwoitz.

On 24 October 2016 Daniel and Laura released their second studio album called 'Overture' featuring 21 songs and 2 overtures. The artists on the album are: Marc Broussard, Earl Carpenter, Melinda Doolittle, Matt Doyle, Hannah Elless, Jason Forbach, Matthew Ford, Ashleigh Gray, Emma Hatton, Samantha Hill, James Monroe Iglehart, Adam Jacobs, Arielle Jacobs, Charlotte Jaconelli, Rachel John, Adam Kaplan, Emmanuel Kojo, Kara Lily-Hayworth, Rebecca Luker, Bryce Pinkham, Courtney Reed, Krysta Rodriguez, Will Swenson and Natalie Weiss.

November 2018 marked the release of a new song by Daniel and Laura called 'The Hero - A West End, Broadway and Hollywood Tribute' in aid of the charity Help For Heroes. The song featured spoken contributions by: Paul Bettany; Jack Black; Dan Brown; Simon Callow; Craig Cash; Henry Cavill; Bryan Cranston; Dame Judi Dench; Stephen Fry; Josh Gad; Whoopi Goldberg; Kelsey Grammer; Richard E. Grant; Kerry Howard; Jeremy Irons; Sir David Jason; Carole King; Steve Martin; Brian May; Sir Paul McCartney; Kevin McKidd; Alan Menken; Piers Morgan; Matthew Morrison; Wendi Peters; Sir Tony Robinson; Jonathan Ross; William Shatner; David Suchet; Zoë Wanamaker; Levison Wood.

The singing contributions on 'The Hero' were recorded by West End & Broadway Performers: Stephen Ashfield (Book Of Mormon Broadway); Sam Bailey (X-Factor Winner); David Bedella (Rocky Horror Show); Norman Bowman (42nd Street West End); Christina Bianco (Joseph & The Amazing Technicolor Dreamcoat); Alan Burkitt (Kiss Me Kate West End); Sophia Anne Caruso (NBC Sound Of Music Live!); Rodney Earl Clarke (On The Town West End); Collabro (Britain's Got Talent Winners); Maria Coyne (Wicked West End); Louise Dearman (Wicked West End); Killian Donnelly (Les Miserables West End); Samantha Dorsey (Les Miserables West End); Kerry Ellis (Wicked West End); Alice Fearn (Wicked West End); Ben Forster (Phantom Of The Opera West End); Emma Hatton (Wicked West End); Kara Lily-Hayworth (Cilla UK Tour); Matt Henry (Kinky Boots West End); Rob Houchen (Les Miserables West End); Ida; James Monroe Iglehart (Hamilton Broadway); Charlotte Jaconelli (Heathers The Musical West End), Emma Kingston (Evita International Tour); Luke McCall (Phantom Of The Opera West End); Jai McDowall (Britain's Got Talent Winner); Nadim Naaman (Phantom Of The Opera West End); Trevor Dion Nicholas (Aladdin West End and Broadway); David Phelps; Dame Siân Phillips (Cabaret West End); Laura Pitt-Pulford (Seven Brides For Seven Brothers West End); Joe Aaron Reid (Dreamgirls West End); David Ribi (Dreamboats and Petticoats West End) Oliver Savile (Wicked West End); Cleve September (Hamilton West End); Charlie Stemp (Hello Dolly! Broadway); Savannah Stevenson (Wicked West End); Marisha Wallace (Dreamgirls West End); Emma Williams (Mrs Henderson Presents West End); Michael Xavier (Sunset Boulevard Broadway).

April 2019, saw the release of a project supporting a children's hospice called 'Thunder From A Flame' and featured: Alexander Armstrong, Anton Du Beke, Nikki Amuka-Bird, Laura Benanti, Daniel Brocklebank, Rob Brydon, John Challis, Joanne Clifton, Angel Coulby, Gino D'Acampo, Jack Dee, Amy Dickson, James Dreyfus, Sally Dynevor, Sir Gareth Edwards, Escala, Will Ferrell, Pam Ferris, Michael Flatley, Michael J. Fox, Leigh Halfpenny, Connie Hyde, Jason Isaacs, Sir Derek Jacobi, Lennie James, Rebecca Keatley, Maureen Lipman, Matt Lucas, Rob Mallard, Tim McInnerny, Mark Moraghan, Sam Neill, James Norton, Kai Owen, Gail Porter, James Purefoy, Harry Redknapp, Matthew Rhys, Chita Rivera, Danny Sapani, Rufus Sewell, Reece Shearsmith, Jack P. Shepherd, Colson Smith, Sir Patrick Stewart, Claire Sweeney, Harriet Thorpe, Michael Le Vell, Bradley Walsh, Ed Westwick, Laura Wright, Rachel Yankey. The vocals were recorded by Kara Lindsay and Luke McCall.

November 2019, the couple released their latest charity project in support of those who are currently the target of bullying behaviour. The Stand project featured messages by: Grace Van Patten; Jesse Tyler Ferguson, Michael Emerson; Bob Odenkirk; Zahn McClarnon; Mark Pellegrino; Alfonso Ribeiro; Jerry Springer; Megan Fox; Sir Mark Rylance; James Morrison; Courteney Cox; Robert Patrick Benedict; Sir Michael Palin; Dawn French; Zack Snyder; Larry King; Josh Brolin; David Oyelowo; Ray Romano; Sarah Drew; Monica Lewinsky; Jodie Whittaker; Jason Alexander; Naomi Campbell; Joey Fatone; Jack Be; Gene Simmons; Walton Goggins; Brendan O'Carroll; Jennifer Gibney; LisaGay Hamilton; CCH Pounder. Stand was Recorded by country artist Katy Hurt

During the COVID-19 pandemic lockdown Dan and Laura teamed up with The Barn theatre to present an online concert, featuring West End stars to support the theatre's relief fund. They also released a video series called 'Creativity and Confidence at Home' for children home-schooling due to Worldwide school closures. High-profile contributors included: Lord Andrew Lloyd Webber, Dame Kelly Holmes, Heston Blumenthal, Sir Ben Ainslie, Illumination Entertainment, and Billy Collins.

Daniel and Laura also specialize in performing American show tunes from the first half of the 20th century (also known as Standards, or the Great American Songbook)."

== Collaborations ==
Year	Title	Main Artist	Contribution
2013	A Miner's Song	Daniel Curtis and Laura Coyne	"A Miner's Song - Welsh Artist Collective including Michael Sheen, Jonathan Pryce, Paul Potts, John Owen-Jones, Matthew Rhys, Aled Jones, Ioan Gruffudd, Joe Calzaghe and the voice of the late Richard Burton."
2014	Love on 42nd Street	Daniel Curtis and Laura Coyne	"Featuring Ramin Karimloo, Lea Salonga, Sierra Boggess, John Owen-Jones, Samantha Barks, Simon Bowman, Katy Treharne and Kasia Howley"
2014	Songs of Daniel Curtis and Laura Coyne	Laura Osnes	"When You Smile"
2015	Songs of Daniel Curtis and Laura Coyne	Cheyenne Jackson	"Find the Best of Me"
2015	Songs of Daniel Curtis and Laura Coyne	Lisa O'Hare	"All Your Dreams"
2015	Songs of Daniel Curtis and Laura Coyne	Adam Pascal	"Everyone Can Help Someone"
2015	Songs of Daniel Curtis and Laura Coyne	Chris McCarrell and Katie Rose Clarke	"Now You're Here"
2016	Songs of Daniel Curtis and Laura Coyne	Jenna Ushkowitz	"Standing On My Own"
2016	Overture	The Music Of Daniel Curtis and Laura Coyne	"Marc Broussard, Earl Carpenter, Melinda Doolittle, Matt Doyle, Hannah Elless, Jason Forbach, Matthew Ford, Ashleigh Gray, Emma Hatton, Samantha Hill, James Monroe Iglehart, Adam Jacobs, Arielle Jacobs, Charlotte Jaconelli, Rachel John, Adam Kaplan, Emmanuel Kojo, Kara Lily-Hayworth, Rebecca Luker, Bryce Pinkham, Courtney Reed, Krysta Rodriguez, Will Swenson, Natalie Weiss "
2018	The Hero	Daniel Curtis and Laura Coyne	"The Hero - A West End, Broadway and Hollywood Tribute."
2019	Thunder From A Flame	Daniel Curtis and Laura Coyne	"Thunder From A Flame - Stars Join Together For Special Music Project."
2019	Stand	Daniel Curtis and Laura Coyne	"Stand - Anti-Bullying Music Project."

== Media appearances ==
Daniel has made numerous television appearances including S4C's Wedi 3, the BBC One Show, Songs of Praise and X Ray. His radio broadcasts include BBC Radio 2, BBC Radio 3, BBC Lincolnshire, BBC Radio Northampton, BBC Radio Merseyside, and BBC Radio Wales. He has performed at venues that include London's Trafalgar Square (as part of West End Live 2011), the 2010 Welsh Proms at St David's Hall, the BAFTA Awards, and the Waldorf Astoria Orlando in Florida.

== Philanthropy ==
Alongside Laura Coyne he launched two projects to help preserve the Great American Songbook: one to teach schoolchildren about the music, composers, and artists in the hope of inspiring them to keep the music alive; and one to record elderly people's recollections of what the music has meant to them.
