= Carillon (disambiguation) =

A carillon is a musical instrument of bells in the percussion family.

Carillon, the carillon, or le carillon may also refer to:

== Geography ==
- Carillon (electoral district), Manitoba, Canada
- Carillon, Richmond, Virginia, US
- Carillon, a village and former municipality of Saint-André-d'Argenteuil, Quebec
- Carillon City, a shopping centre in Perth, Western Australia
- Carillon Historical Park, Dayton, Ohio, US
- Carillon Tower, a skyscraper in Charlotte, North Carolina, US
- Loughborough Carillon, a tower and war memorial in Loughborough, UK
- National Carillon, a carillon in Canberra, Australia

== Music ==
- Carillon (Elgar), a recitation with orchestral accompaniment by Edward Elgar
- Carillon (Murrill), a composition for organ by Herbert Murrill
- "Carillon", a song by Sky from Sky
- Carillons (Williams), a composition for orchestra by Grace Williams
- Le Carillon (EP), an EP by The Autumns
- Le carillon, a ballet by Jules Massenet
- Carillon de Westminster, a composition for organ by Louis Vierne
- "Carillon-Sortie", a composition by Henri Mulet
- Carillon tubulaire, see Tubular bells

== Newspapers ==
- Le Carillon, Hawkesbury, Ontario
- The Carillon (Steinbach), Steinbach, Manitoba
- The Carillon (Regina), University of Regina

== See also ==
- Carillion, a former British multinational company
