= Laura Coyne =

British musicians

Laura Coyne is a Welsh composer and musician. As a composer, she is best known for her writing within the theatre industry.

== Career ==
Daniel Curtis and Laura Coyne specialize in performing American show tunes from the first half of the 20th century (also known as Standards, or the "Great American Songbook").

== Media appearances ==
They have made numerous television appearances including S4C's Wedi 3, the BBC One Show, Songs of Praise and X Ray. Their radio broadcasts include BBC Radio 2, BBC Radio 3, BBC Lincolnshire, BBC Radio Northampton, BBC Radio Merseyside, and BBC Radio Wales. They have performed at venues that include London's Trafalgar Square (as part of West End Live 2011), the 2010 Welsh Proms at St David's Hall, the BAFTA Awards, and the Waldorf Astoria Orlando in Florida.

== Philanthropy ==
They have launched two projects to help preserve the Great American Songbook: one to teach schoolchildren about the music, composers, and artists in the hope of inspiring them to keep the music alive; and one to record elderly people's recollections of what the music has meant to them.
