= NYOW =

NYOW may refer to:

- National Youth Orchestra of Wales
- New York, Ontario and Western Railway
