= Mervyn Burtch =

Welsh composer

Mervyn Burtch MBE (7 November 1929 – 12 May 2015) was a Welsh composer, best known for his work with children's music projects.

== Life and career ==
Burtch was born in Ystrad Mynach, Wales. Except for his two years of National Service in the RAF, he lived his entire life in the Rhymney Valley. He attended Lewis' School in Pengam, and was inspired to become a composer when he watched his teacher, David Wynne, copying out parts, and decided that was the kind of work he would like to do. He studied at Cardiff University, and subsequently became Head of Music at Bargoed Grammar Technical School, and then Head of Music at Lewis Girls' School in Ystrad Mynach. In 1979 he joined the staff of the then Welsh College of Music and Drama (WCMD) and was Head of the Performance course at the College until 1989. After that he devoted himself to composition. His extensive output of instrumental and vocal works included 17 string quartets, 14 concertos, 13 operas for children and numerous choral and brass band pieces.

Drawing on his experience as a teacher, he was especially successful in composing for young musicians. In 1984 the WCMD began its Schools' Opera Programme under his direction, and he wrote some dozen short children's operas that were performed by more than 80,000 schoolchildren. Then in 1996, together with the Welsh-Canadian author and educator Mark Morris, he founded the international KidsOp project. This won a prestigious Cable and Wireless Childnet Award in 1998. In 2003 Mervyn Burtch was awarded the MBE for his services to music and education in Wales, and for his work as President of KidsOp.

In collaboration with Mark Morris he wrote six operas combining the resources of young performers and professional musicians, and he developed close ties with Canada. He coached and took part in productions at The Banff Centre and other venues in Alberta, as well as assisting in the exchange of both child and adult musicians and singers between Canada and Wales. Their first collaboration, Coyote and the Winter that Never Ends was produced in Wetaskiwin, Alberta, in 1997. The second opera, Wizard Things, was produced the following year in Cardiff, Wetaskiwin, Edmonton and London (UK). Their most successful work, The Raven King was first produced in Blackwood, Wales in 1999, with subsequent productions in Canada (Banff Arts Festival), South Africa, Cardiff, Germany, Ireland (Wexford Festival Opera), and Mexico (XIII International Music Festival, Morelia). These were developed as a collaborative project via the internet; children in the different countries exchanged their ideas through chat-rooms on the KidsOp web-site and contributed stories and drawings. The following year, 500 Welsh schoolchildren took part in a performance at the Royal Albert Hall in London. The opera's subject, inspired by Shakespeare's The Tempest, is the complex relationships between humans and animals, and how they can learn to communicate and live together in harmony. Scoring is for Orff percussion orchestra, piano duet and solo percussionist.

The project's fifth opera, Jason and Hanna, was premiered in Caerphilly in 2003, and in 2008 Manitoba Opera gave its second performance at the CanWest Performing Arts Centre in Winnipeg. Its libretto, inspired by the tragedy of the war in the Balkans during the 1990s, tells a story of young lovers doomed by the enmity of their families. A seventh opera, Twm Siôn Cati (based on the adventures of the 16th century 'Welsh Robin Hood'), was written in 2005 in collaboration with Simon Rees. It was premiered in Wales by the Caerphilly Borough KidsOp group.

The Song Contest of the Birds and the Beasts is a semi-staged work, 40 minutes long, for choir, mezzo-soprano and baritone soloists and orchestra, with libretto by Simon Rees; it concerns a song contest for the birds and beasts. It was commissioned by Welsh National Opera, and was performed in Cardiff (St David's Hall) in July 2010 with a choir of 200 junior school children, two soloists drawn from the chorus of Welsh National Opera and the WNO orchestra.

A significant portion of Burtch's output was choral, and his works in this genre included his popular arrangements of Welsh folk songs which the National Youth Choir of Wales recorded in 1999. He was influenced early in his career by the music of Leoš Janáček, and a characteristic of his vocal writing was the frequent use of irregular metres, which add vitality and preserve the fluency of the native speech rhythms of the text. The Cardiff Polyphonic Choir under Simon Lovell-Jones recorded eight selections for Black Mountain Records. The texts set in these works cover a wide range from the Anglican Liturgy to Welsh and Chinese poets, including Robert Hillyer's translation of the Egyptian Book of the Dead in Egyptian Litany, composed in 1994.

Burtch once said he regretted not having learned the viola so he could play in a string quartet, a medium he loved: he composed string quartets throughout his career, and in particular in the final years of his life. To celebrate his 80th birthday year in 2009, he composed a new Piano Trio that was premiered on 13 June at the Gregynog Festival in mid-Wales.

In 1991 Burtch received the John Edwards Memorial Award, one of Wales's most prestigious music honours, for the promotion of Welsh Music. In 2014 The Mervyn Burtch Trust was set up to preserve his music, and is collaborating with the National Library of Wales to create a digital archive of all his manuscripts.

Burtch died on 12 May 2015 at the age of 85. His wife Rita, whom he married at age 74, survived him.

== Other sources ==
- Welsh Music/Cerddoriaeth Cymru : Spring/Summer 1989, Vol 8 No.10, pp. 14–28
- Composers of Wales – Mervyn Burtch : Ninnau Vol 36 No. 2, March–April 2011 p. 12
