= Arwel Hughes =

Welsh orchestral conductor and composer

Arwel Hughes OBE (25 August 1909 – 23 September 1988) was a Welsh orchestral conductor and composer.

== Life and career ==
Hughes was born in Rhosllannerchrugog near Wrexham and was educated at Ruabon Grammar School and at the Royal College of Music, where he studied with Ralph Vaughan Williams and C. H. Kitson. Following his studies at the RCM he became organist at the church of St Philip and St James, Oxford, and in 1935 returned to Wales to join the staff of the BBC's music department under Mansel Thomas. His duties included a great deal of conducting, and he used his position to champion the music of compatriots such as Grace Williams, David Wynne, and Alun Hoddinott; arguably to the detriment of his own musical legacy as a composer, though as a part of his role he was also called upon to compose, arrange and orchestrate music for live radio broadcasts.

Hughes became Head of Music at BBC Wales in 1965, holding the post until his retirement in 1971. He was appointed OBE in 1969 for his services to Welsh music and for organising the music for the Investiture of Charles, Prince of Wales, in the same year. From 1978 until 1986 he was Honorary Music Director of the Llangollen International Eisteddfod.

Hughes married Enid Thomas in 1940. There were two sons, Ieuan and Owain (the orchestral conductor), and a daughter, Delun. Grandson Meuryn Hughes runs Aureus Publishing.

He died on 23 September 1988 aged 79 in Cardiff and was cremated at Thornhill Crematorium.

== Music ==
Hughes' conducting and other professional duties left relatively little time for composing and considering the length of his career in music his output as a composer was comparatively small.

His romantic, lyrical musical language is conservative, even anachronistic in the wider context of twentieth-century British music, though relatively unusual for a Welsh composer. Hughes drew inspiration from Welsh literature, history, mythology, folk culture and the Welsh religious tradition: much of his program music draws in some way from these sources. His approach to this source material is firmly in the wider romantic tradition and not necessarily any different to that of composers of other nationalities to their own cultural contexts, it does provide a distinctly Welsh character to Hughes' music which can be seen in the (otherwise very different) music of his rough contemporaries Grace Williams and Daniel Jones.

His main legacy as a composer are perhaps his works for chorus and orchestra, including the large-scale oratorios, Dewi Sant (Saint David), commissioned for the Festival of Britain in 1951 and Pantycelyn, performed at the National Eisteddfod in Swansea in 1964. These exemplify his imagination and technical competence, combining the early twentieth century British tradition with his original harmonic language. The earlier Gweddi (A Prayer) from 1944 is a shorter work for soprano, chorus and strings, characteristically melodic.

For many years Arwel Hughes conducted performances by Welsh National Opera, and his own two operas, Menna, to a libretto by Wyn Griffith, a tragedy based on a Welsh folk legend; and Serch yw’r Doctor ("Love’s the Doctor"), a comedy adapted by Saunders Lewis from Molière's L'Amour médecin, were produced by WNO in 1953 and 1960 respectively. These works played an important role in the development of opera in Wales, and demonstrate Hughes' lyricism and melodic originality.

Hughes' orchestral writing includes a Fantasia for Strings which has received many performances. From the 1940s onwards, he produced a stream of works for orchestra including Suite for Orchestra, Prelude for Orchestra (dedicated to the Youth of Wales), Anatiomaros, and a symphony.

There are a quantity of songs and chamber music, including three string quartets, which have been recorded by the Maggini Quartet.

There are also many arrangements of folk songs and some incidental music for radio and television.

== Principal works ==
=== Opera ===
- Menna (1950–51), libretto by Wyn Griffith (first performance 1953 at the Sophia Gardens Pavilion Cardiff by Welsh National Opera with Richard Lewis and Edith Osler)
- Serch yw'r Doctor (Love's the doctor), libretto by Saunders Lewis, after Molière's L'Amour médecin (first performance 1960 at the Sophia Gardens Pavilion Cardiff by Welsh National Opera)

=== Orchestral ===
- Fantasia, strings, 1936
- Anatiomaros, 1943
- Prelude for Orchestra, 1945
- Suite, 1947
- Symphony, 1971
- Legend: Owain Glyndŵr, 1979

=== Choral ===
- Tydi a Roddaist (T. Rowland Hughes), chorus, piano, also arranged for female chorus, male chorus with orchestra, 1938
- Gweddi (A Prayer) (liturgical text), S, chorus, strings (alternative version with full orchestra), 1944
- Dewi Sant (Saint David) (A. T. Davies), oratorio, S, T, B, chorus, orchestra, 1950
- Pantycelyn (text arr. A. T. Davies), oratorio, S, T, B, chorus, orchestra, 1963
- Saint Francis (masque, G. James), S, T, narrator, chorus, orchestra 1965
- Mab y Dyn (Son of Man) (cantata, biblical text), S, chorus, organ, 1967
- The Beatitudes (biblical text) S, (T) TTBB, organ
- In memoriam (Psalm 121), chorus, organ, 1969
- Psalm 148, male chorus, 1970
- Mass for Celebration, S, A, male chorus, orchestra without woodwind, 1977
- Gloria Patri, SATB, orchestra, 1986

=== Chamber ===
- String Quartet No 1 (1948)
- String Quartet No 2 (1976)
- String Quartet No 3 (1983)
- Unfinished quartet 1932
