= Nagasaki (Schnittke) =

1958 oratorio by Alfred Schnittke

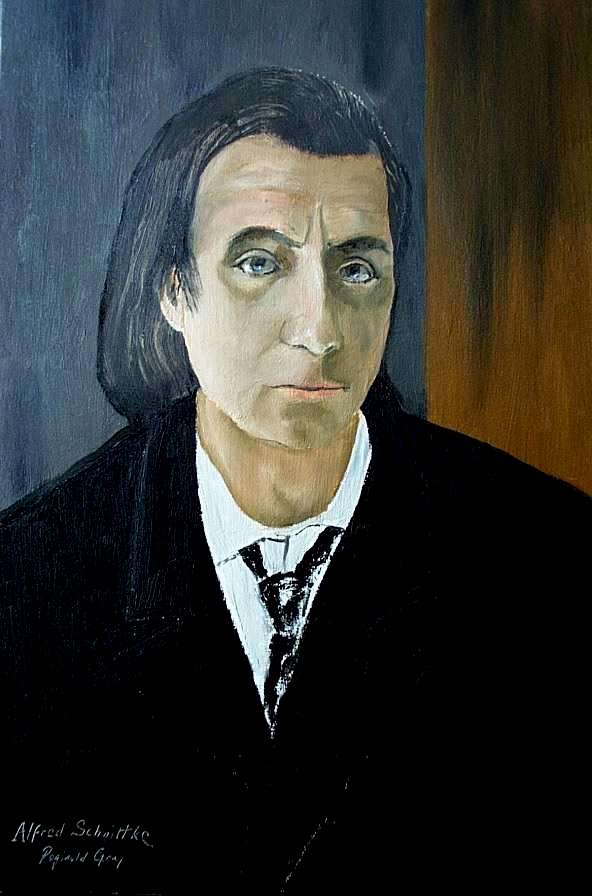
Portrait of Alfred Schnittke by Reginald Gray (1972)

Nagasaki is an oratorio composed by Soviet composer Alfred Schnittke in 1958, at the age of 25. It was Schnittke's graduation composition in the Moscow Conservatory, and the topic was suggested by his teacher Evgeny Golubev.

The work was considered formalistic, and Schnittke was accused of forgetting the principles of Realism. Thus, he suppressed the expressionistic central movement depicting the nuclear explosion and modified the finale. It was recorded by the Moscow Radio Symphony in 1959 and broadcast to Japan through Voice of Russia, but it wasn't printed and it didn't receive any subsequent performances. Nagasaki was finally given its public premiere in its original form in Cape Town on 23 November 2006, eight years after Schnittke's death, by Rupert Hanneli and the Cape Philharmonic conducted by Owain Arwel Hughes.

== Form ==
It consists of five movements, on Soviet and Japanese lyrics:

1. "Nagasaki, City of Grief" (Anatoly Sofronov)
2. "The Morning" (Tōson Shimazaki)
3. "On that Fateful Day" (A. Sofronov)
4. "On the Ashes" [Yoneda Eisaku) (Note: Yoneda Eisaku, Yoneda is the family name, is a Japanese poet and one of victims of the Atomic Bombing of Hiroshima, not of Nagasaki hence he wrote poems about Hiroshima not Nagasaki but Schnittke applied his two verses from Kawa yo Towa ni Utsukushiku (川よ とわに美しく), Yoneda's second poetry collection published in 1952. Words are taken from Kōhai ni Tachite, 1(荒廃に立ちて その一) and Kawa yo Towa ni Utsukushiku, 1(川よ とはに美しく その一). The first and second stanzas in the text of the fourth movement are from Kōhai ni Tachite, 1 and the third and fourth from Kawa yo Towa ni Utsukushiku, 1.The former are relatively correctly translated from Yoneda's original but the latter altered by the Russian translator. Especially Yoneda's original poem is almost not included in the fourth stanza to be able to say it is effectively a new poem by the translator.)
5. "The Sun of Peace" (Georgy Fere)

== Recordings ==
- Rupert Hanneli, mezzo-soprano. Cape Philharmonic – Owain Arwel Hughes. BIS, 2007.

== See also ==
- Alfred Schnittke
- Atomic bombings of Hiroshima and Nagasaki
