= Branwen (disambiguation) =

Branwen is a woman in Welsh mythology. The name may also refer to:

== People ==
- Branwen Gwyn, Welsh television presenter
- Branwen Okpako (born 1969), Nigerian–born Welsh-German filmmaker

== Other uses ==
- Branwen (film), a 1995 British Welsh-language drama
- an alternate spelling of Brangaine, the handmaid and confidante of Iseult in the Arthurian legend of Tristan and Iseult
