= National Youth Orchestra of Wales =

Welsh youth orchestra

- Youth orchestra
- Native name: Cerddorfa Genedlaethol Ieuenctid Cymru
- Short name: NYOW
- Founded: 1945
- Location: Cardiff
- Website: www.nyaw.org.uk/national-youth-orchestra-of-wales

The National Youth Orchestra of Wales (NYOW, Welsh: Cerddorfa Genedlaethol Ieuenctid Cymru) is the national youth orchestra of Wales, based in Cardiff. Founded in 1945, it is the longest-standing national youth orchestra in the world.

== Organisation ==
The orchestra numbers around 115 young players aged between 13 and 22 years who are auditioned and drawn from all over Wales, and who represent some of Wales' most talented young musicians.

The NYOW has performed in St David's Hall (Cardiff), the Bridgewater Hall (Manchester), the National Concert Hall (Dublin), Waterfront Hall (Belfast), Town Hall (Birmingham), Sage Gateshead, Beethovensaal (Stuttgart), the Salle Erasme (Strasbourg) the Konzerthaus am Gendarmenmarkt (Berlin), and La Mortella on the island of Ischia.

Many Welsh composers have been commissioned to write new works for the orchestra, such as Grace Williams, David Wynne, Daniel Jones, Arwel Hughes, former member Karl Jenkins, and founder member of the orchestra Alun Hoddinott. (Two dozen pairs of clogs were needed for the Orchestra's premiere of Karl Jenkins' Scenes From Wales in 2000).

=== Conductors ===
The NYOW has traditionally appointed a resident Principal Conductor and Musical Director. These have included Clarence Raybould (1945–1966), Arthur Davison (1967–1990), Elgar Howarth (1991–1995), Christopher Adey (1996–2002), and Owain Arwel Hughes (2003–2010). 2011's concert series was conducted by Takuo Yuasa. Carlo Rizzi (2012), Grant Llewellyn (2013), Jac Van Steen (2014), and Paul Daniel (2015). Carlo Rizzi returned for the 2016–2018 season. American conductor, Andrew Litton, conducted the 2019 concert series.

=== Courses ===
A residential course is normally held in the summer, followed by a short tour comprising four or five concerts. Known to its members as the "NASH" the annual residency offers a valuable opportunity for talented musicians to work together with top professionals in an intensive environment, culminating in a series of concerts. Since 2013, a young composers course has run alongside the orchestra's summer residency, giving composers the opportunity to have their music played by members of the orchestra. Works are composed during each residency which are then given their first performances at venues including The Royal Welsh College of Music and Drama, Aberystwyth University and in 2015 in the performing foyer spaces at Sage Gateshead and St David's Hall Cardiff.

Since 2001, the National Youth Orchestra of Wales and the BBC National Orchestra of Wales have worked together on projects culminating in joint concerts or recordings, giving young players the opportunity to play alongside some of the best orchestral players in Britain.

=== Auditions ===
Candidates are accepted for audition on the approval of their county Head of Music Service and are expected to support music activity at school/college and county level. The minimum standard for all instruments (except harp) is Grade VIII. Harpists may play at Grade VI. Auditions take place throughout the autumn around Wales and at selected centres in England for those studying away from home.

== History ==
- 1945 Orchestra founded by Irwyn Walters
- 1946 First concert at the Rolls Hall, Monmouth
- 1948 First appearance at the National Eisteddfod where the first recordings were made for future broadcasting
- 1953 First broadcast to the Commonwealth to mark the Coronation of Queen Elizabeth
- 1955 The NYOW appeared at the Edinburgh Festival
- 1956 First record launched by Qualiton Records
- 1957 First concert tour abroad

== Repertoire ==
Vaughan Williams' A London Symphony featured in an all British-programme in 2008, alongside the Celtic Dances of Welsh composer, William Mathias. A former member of the National Youth Theatre of Wales, Hollywood actor Matthew Rhys narrated the first-ever Welsh translation of Britten's Young Person's Guide to the Orchestra in a NYOW concert at St David's Hall, on 7 August as part of the National Eisteddfod in Cardiff.

The 2009 programme included Arwel Hughes Prelude for Orchestra, Tchaikovsky Swan Lake Ballet Suite and Mahler Symphony No. 1, with the orchestra performing at Aberystwyth Arts Centre; Prichard-Jones Hall, Bangor; Adrian Boult Hall, Birmingham; Sage, Gateshead; Three Choirs Festival, Hereford Cathedral and St David's Hall, Cardiff

The 2010 programme included Brian Hughes's Troad, Claude Debussy's La mer, and Rachmaninoff's Symphony No. 2. The orchestra performed at St David's Cathedral; Aberystwyth Arts Centre; St David's Hall, Cardiff; St Asaph's Cathedral; and RNCM Concert Hall, Manchester.

2011's repertoire included Hilary Tann's From the Feather to the Mountain, Liszt's Tasso, Lamento e Trionfo and Prokofiev's Symphony No. 5. Concerts were held at William Aston Hall, Glyndŵr University, Wrexham; Sage Gateshead; RNCM Concert Hall, Manchester; and St David's Hall, Cardiff.

2014's repertoire included Berlioz Symphonie Fantastique, with performances at St David's Hall, Cardiff, Sage Gateshead, St Asaph Cathedral, and at the Fishguard Music Festival at St David's Cathedral.

2015's repertoire included Dukas' La Péri, Schmitt, La Tragedie de Salome and Stravinsky's The Rite of Spring, with performances at the Three Choirs Festival in Hereford Cathedral as well as Bangor University and St David's Hall, Cardiff.

The 2016 season included Bartók's Concerto for Orchestra and Strauss' Ein Heldenleben, as well as a new commission Fanfare for our Youth by Gareth Wood (commissioned especially for the orchestra on their 70th anniversary).

In the summer of 2017, the orchestra performed Richard Strauss' Der Rosenkavalier Suite, Till Eulenspiegel's Merry Pranks, Benjamin Britten's Four Sea Interludes from Peter Grimes and Debussy's La mer.

The 2018 season opened with Richard Strauss’ Serenade for 13 Wind Instruments. This was followed by a first time collaboration with the National Youth Choir of Wales performing Leonard Bernstein's Chichester Psalms to commemorate Bernstein's 100th birthday. The final item of the program was Gustav Mahler's 5th Symphony.

The 2019 concert season conducted by Andrew Litton opened with Grace Williams’ much loved Fantasia on Welsh Nursery Tunes. This was followed by an orchestral suite based on Aaron Copland's only opera; The Tender Land. The final piece was Dmitri Shostakovich's 10th Symphony.

2024's repertoire included Stravinsky's The Firebird, Prokofiev's Romeo and Juliet suites 1 and 2 and Shostakovich's Festive Overture. The orchesrta was conducted by Tianyi Lu.

== See also ==
- National Youth Orchestra of Great Britain
- National Youth Orchestra of Scotland
