= David Wynne =

David Wynne may refer to:

- David Wynne (composer) (1900–1983), Welsh composer
- David Wynne (sculptor) (1926–2014), English sculptor
