= Cape Town Philharmonic Orchestra =

Orchestra based in Cape Town, South Africa

- Philharmonic orchestra
- Short name: CPO
- Former name: Cape Town Municipal Orchestra; Cape Town Symphony Orchestra; Cape Performing Arts Board
- Founded: 1914; 112 years ago
- Location: Cape Town, Western Cape, South Africa
- Concert hall: Cape Town City Hall
- Principal conductor: Bernhard Gueller; Arjan Tien
- Concertmaster: Philip Martens
- Website: cpo.org.za
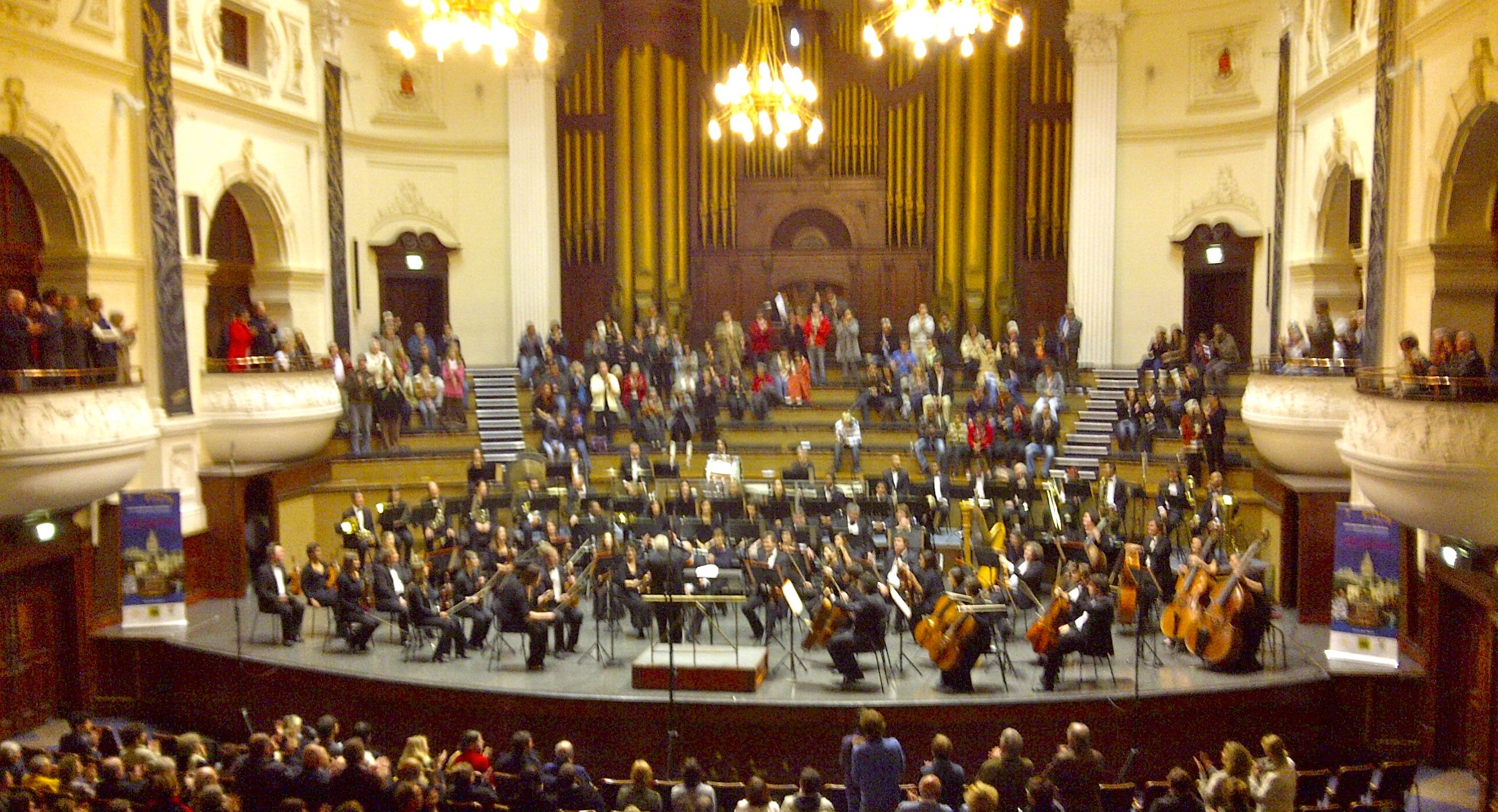

The Cape Town Philharmonic Orchestra (CPO) is an orchestra based in Cape Town, Western Cape, South Africa.

== History ==
Founded by the Cape Town City Council as the Cape Town Municipal Orchestra held its inaugural concert on 28 February 1914 in the Cape Town City Hall. In an effort to revitalize the orchestra, the Cape Town Municipal Orchestra changed its name to the Cape Town Symphony Orchestra (CTSO) in 1969 (see "Orchestra's for 70 players", Cape Argus, 12 December 1968). In 1971, the Cape Performing Arts Board (CAPAB) orchestra was established. In 1986, the CTSO was privatized as a Section 21 Company, an "Association Not For Gain" under South African Law (see The Editor, "The CTSO goes private", Cape Argus, 28 February 1986). In 1997, the CTSO merged with the CAPAB orchestra to become the CTPO, the Cape Town Philharmonic Orchestra (see "Brave new venture – Orchestra has huge potential", Cape Times, 7 April 1997). After the tour to the Canary Islands in 2000, the CTPO closed because of financial problems, and the Cape Philharmonic Orchestra (CPO) was born. The CPO soon established a reputation both nationally and internationally, with concerts and tours throughout South Africa, the UK, Hong Kong, Dubai, Germany and the United States.

Apart from regular symphony concerts, the Cape Town Philharmonic Orchestra (as it is known today), regularly accompanies Cape Town Opera; Cape Town City Ballet; musicals; pop, community, family and crossover concerts, presenting at least 120 concerts per year.

Traditional venues such as the Cape Town City Hall, Artscape Theatre, community and schools halls, and such outdoor venues as Kirstenbosch, Oude Libertas Amphitheatre, and Nederburg Wines, all point to the orchestra's community involvement.

== Educational programs ==
The Cape Town Philharmonic Orchestra's outreach and educational programs include the Cape Town Philharmonic Youth Orchestra (mentored by members of the professional orchestra); Cape Town Philharmonic Youth Wind Ensemble; and the grassroots training project, Masidlale (meaning "let us play" in Xhosa), where disadvantaged township children are taught theory and performance skills.

== Centenary celebrations ==
To mark its centenary celebrations in 2014, the Cape Town Philharmonic Orchestra published A Century of Symphony: The Story of Cape Town's Orchestra to record the history and heritage of symphonic music in Cape Town and beyond. International and local musicians/conductors who performed/conducted the orchestra as referred to in the book are, among others, Jascha Heifetz, Noël Coward, Sir Thomas Beecham, Albert Coates, Igor Stravinsky, Vladimir Ashkenazy, and Pretty Yende.

== Recent history ==
In 2025, the Cape Town Philharmonic Orchestra continued its programme of concerts featuring international guest artists. Austrian violinist Lidia Baich appeared with the orchestra at Cape Town City Hall in January, performing Wolfgang Amadeus Mozart's Violin Concerto No. 3. Swiss pianist Ariane Haering performed with the orchestra later that month in a programme conducted by Bernhard Gueller.

In April, Israeli pianist Yaron Kohlberg performed Sergei Prokofiev's Piano Concerto No. 3 with the orchestra at Cape Town City Hall as part of its Autumn Symphony season. In September, German violinist Tassilo Probst appeared with the orchestra in Henryk Wieniawski's Violin Concerto No. 1 and also gave a masterclass to members of the Cape Town Philharmonic Youth Orchestra.

== Recordings ==
Significant recordings released by the Cape Town Philharmonic Orchestra include Mahler and Wagner songs with mezzo-soprano Hanneli Rupert (Bernhard Gueller, conductor); the Schnittke oratorio Nagasaki, and Symphonies No. 0 and No. 9, a double CD of orchestral masterpieces (Owain Arwel Hughes, conductor); the Barber and Korngold violin concerti with Alexander Gilman as soloist (Perry So, conductor) which won a Diapason d'Or, and the four Spohr clarinet concerti with clarinetist Maria du Toit (Arjan Tien, conductor). Marking his 50th birthday, the South African pianist, François du Toit performed all Beethoven piano concerti in 2016 (Victor Yampolsky, conductor).

== Principal guest conductor ==
Previously music director of the Nuremberg Symphony Orchestra; principal conductor of the Victoria Symphony in BC, Canada, and presently director of Symphony Nova Scotia since 2003, German-born conductor Bernhard Gueller was appointed principal guest conductor of the Cape Town Philharmonic Orchestra in 2016, following Owain Arwel Hughes and Martin Panteleev.

== Resident conductor ==
Winner of the first Len van Zyl Conductors' Competition, Brandon Phillips, is conductor of the Cape Town Philharmonic Youth Orchestra, and resident conductor of the Cape Town Philharmonic Orchestra.
