= Fantasia on Welsh Nursery Tunes =

Work for symphonic orchestra by Grace Williams

- Fantasia by Grace Williams
- Composed: 1940
- Published: 1956
- Recorded: London Symphony Orchestra; Mansel Thomas; 1949

Premiere
- Date: 29 October 1941
- Conductor: Eric Fogg
- Performers: BBC Northern Orchestra

The Fantasia on Welsh Nursery Tunes is a composition for symphonic orchestra, based on traditional Welsh nursery tunes and lullabies, composed by Grace Williams in 1940. Although not typical of Williams' work it brought her to prominence and is the composer's most popular work.

I had a thorough grounding in Welsh airs and Welsh folk songs when I was a child and teenager, and they found their way into some very early works, now withdrawn, and of course into the Fantasia.

— Grace Williams, Interview with Heward Rees

The orchestration includes the harp to add a Welsh flavour and percussion to evoke memories of childhood.

== Composition history ==
It is not clear when Williams started to compose the Fantasia but Benjamin Britten records a meeting with Williams to discuss "her new Welsh variations" on 24 March 1938. Williams claimed that "I tossed it off (i.e. the sketch of it) in an evening" – in a letter to Idris Lewis (musical director of British International Pictures) in June 1942. The last page of the score is annotated "Feb 9th 1940".

The Fantasia may have been modelled on Sir Henry Wood's Fantasia on British Sea Songs, or the fantasias on folk tunes by Vaughan Williams, Williams' teacher, where a number of familiar tunes are joined with original music.

== Structure and instrumentation ==
The work lasts about 11 minutes and is in one movement using eight Welsh tunes. The beginning and end use the quicker tunes which frame a middle section which uses the slower, wistful tunes. Each tune is stated and discussed, and followed by a transition into the next tune. The work finishes with a return to the initial theme. The tunes, in order, are:

- Jim Cro (Note: A card game popular with miners) – also known as Dacw Mam yn Dwâd (Here's mummy coming) (Note: The tune bears a close resemblance to Yankee Doodle)
- Deryn y Bwn (The Bittern) (Note: Deryn y Bwn is not included in the list of tunes Williams prefaced in the score, but has been identified by Boyd.)
- Migildi, Magildi (nonsense words imitating the sound of a hammer on an anvil)
- Si lwli mabi (Sleep my baby)
- Gee Geffyl Bach (Gee-up, little horse)
- Cysga Di, Fy Mhlentyn Tlws (Sleep, my pretty child)
- Yr eneth ffein ddu (Where are you going, my pretty maid?)
- Cadi Ha (Summer Katie) (Note: A song linked to May Day celebrations in North East Wales. The "Katie" is a man dressed as a woman who leads the celebrations. The Cadi Ha festival dates back 200 years, but lapsed after World War I until it was revived in 1998 at Holywell.)

The Fantasia starts at a lively pace (allegro vivo) with the tune (Jim Cro) played on the trumpet. (Note: The trumpet was one of Williams' favourite instruments.) The trumpet, now muted, introduces Deryn y Bwn (the rhythm of the original tune is adapted to match that of Jim Cro). Migildi, Magildi starts on the glockenspiel (one bar), then the strings (one bar), the glockenspiel again (one bar), and strings again (one bar), before the oboe completes the tune. (Note: After the trumpet, the oboe (and the cor anglais) were the particular favourite orchestral instruments of Williams.)

The slower middle section, marked molto tranquillo (very calmly), begins with Si lwli mabi on flute; followed by Gee Geffyl Bach on french horn; and ends with Cysga Di, Fy Mhlentyn Tlws (on oboe and bassoon).

The last section returns to the lively pace of the opening with a reprise of Jim Cro before Yr eneth ffein ddu is introduced on oboe and violins. The last new tune (Cadi Ha) is also introduced on trumpet, before the Fantasia finishes with a return to Jim Cro.

The Fantasia is written for a full orchestra:

- Woodwind: 2 flutes (II + piccolo), 2 oboes, 2 clarinets, and 2 bassoons
- Brass: 2 trumpets, 4 french horns, and 3 trombones (2 tenor and 1 bass)
- Percussion: timpani, 2 players (side drum, cymbals, tambourine, triangle, and glockenspiel)
- Strings: harp, violins, violas, cellos, and double bass

== Performance ==
The Fantasia was given its first performance by the BBC Northern Orchestra conducted by Eric Fogg on 29 October 1941 in a broadcast by the BBC. Performances throughout Wales followed (with premieres by the National Youth Orchestra of Wales and Welsh National Opera in 1946) and the good reception led to the first recording a few years later.

Another performance of Fantasia by the National Youth Orchestra of Wales (NYOW) in 1952 was followed by performances of works by Williams in 1953, 1954, and 1955 (Penillion – which was commissioned and premiered by NYOW). Tension between Williams and the orchestra's management resulted in Williams refusing permission to allow the NYOW to perform her works. A change in management was followed by a performance of Fantasia by the orchestra in 1968. A commercially successful recording of Fantasia (with works by other Welsh composers) by the NYOW followed in 1969 and sold 20,000 copies in less than a year.

== Reception and reviews ==
The immediate popularity of the Fantasia, especially in war-time Wales, helped Williams to become more widely known, and it is still her most popular work and an important part of her output.

The Fantasia has been described as "deliciously scored, whimsical, touching and light-hearted by turns". Guy and Llewelyn-Jones note that the use of percussion emphasises the "colours and imagery of childhood" and the harp "adds some strong Celtic flavour". Cotterill notes that "The Fantasia's greatest achievement, however, in spite of its necessarily fragmented nature and thematic diversity, is that it retains a sophisticated level of cohesion that Hen Walia [an earlier work] fails to approach by more confidently deploying its traditional material." Mathias describes it as "a work of bold and colourful tonal contrasts".

By contrast, Boyd notes that "the harmonizations are often heavy and conventional, and the structure loose". He also compares the orchestration unfavourably with that of Hoddinott's Welsh Dances (Set 1 – 1956; Set 2 – 1969) and Mathias's Celtic Dances (1972).

The Fantasia remains popular with performers both young and old.

== Williams' attitudes to the Fantasia ==
Williams clearly felt affection for Fantasia:

It was never meant to be taken seriously. I like the little work well enough – lovely Welsh tunes – but, but, but______

— Grace Williams, a letter to Idris Lewis in June 1942

and:

I can give something of myself to folksong fantasias + such things – yes I know they are derivative but they've got a splash of me in – because I really + truly love those traditional tunes.

— Grace Williams, Letter to Daniel Jones, 4 February 1950

but feared that its success might limit the BBC's enthusiasm for new works (as had happened with Hen Walia earlier in her career). In 1957 Williams successfully lobbied for Penillion (1955) rather than the Fantasia ("that old work") to be scheduled for the 1958 Proms season. (Note: As of January 2016 Fantasia has not been included in a Prom concert.)

In 1968 the National Youth Orchestra of Wales ran a competition to attract young composers but failed to find any suitable compositions, so planned to return to the Fantasia. Williams suggested various composers but none had entered the competition so, to Williams' dismay, the Fantasia was scheduled again including a performance at the Eisteddfod that year. (Note: By happy coincidence the Eisteddfod that year was held in Williams' home town of Barry.) This led to another recording (along with other works by Welsh composers).

== Recordings ==
The Fantasia was first recorded in 1949 by the London Symphony Orchestra, conducted by Mansel Thomas, paid for by the Welsh Recorded Music Society (later to become the Welsh Music Guild), and released on a 78 rpm record. It was the first recording of a work by a female Welsh composer. The recording was later included in the Decca catalogue.

Recordings include:

- London Symphony Orchestra conducted by Mansel Thomas (78 rpm, 1949 and on LP, 1950, Decca AK1999-2000 and LX3025)
- National Youth Orchestra of Wales conducted by Arthur Davison (LP, 1969, Music for Pleasure SMFP2129)
- London Symphony Orchestra conducted by Sir Charles Groves (Grace Williams (also includes Carillons, Penillion, Trumpet Concerto, and Sea Sketches), LP, 1974, His Master's Voice ASD3006 and CD, 1995, Lyrita SRCD323) (Note: Remastering of the old recordings and CD release were made with the support of the Arts Council of Wales))
- Royal Ballet Sinfonia conducted by Andrew Penny (CD, 1999, Naxos 8.225048)
