= Orquesta Sinfónica de Navarra =

Spanish symphony orchestra

Orquesta Sinfónica de Navarra (OSN)
- Orchestra
- Founded: 1879
- Principal conductor: Perry So
- Website: www.orquestadenavarra.es

The Orquesta Sinfónica de Navarra (Basque: Naffaroako Orkestra Sinfonikoa), also known by its acronym OSN, is a Spanish symphony orchestra based in Pamplona (Navarre). Founded in 1879 by the composer and violin virtuoso Pablo de Sarasate, it is the oldest active independent orchestra in Spain.

Since 2022 its chief conductor is Perry So, and it is made up of 53 regular performers. It is a member of the Spanish Association of Symphony Orchestras and of the Network of Organizers of Educational and Social Concerts.
