= John Georgiadis =

British violinist and conductor (1939–2021)

- Born: 17 July 1939; Southend-on-Sea, Essex, England
- Died: 5 January 2021 (aged 81)
- Education: Royal Academy of Music
- Occupations: Violinist; conductor; academic
- Organizations: Birmingham Symphony Orchestra; London Symphony Orchestra; Royal Liverpool Philharmonic Orchestra; Royal Academy of Music; Bangkok Symphony Orchestra
- Spouses: Susan Salter (m. 1961; died 2006); Monica Mollerstrom (married ?–2021)
- Children: 3

John Alexander Georgiadis (17 July 1939 – 5 January 2021) was a British violinist and conductor. He was twice Concert Leader with the London Symphony Orchestra during the 1960s and 70s, a member of both the ensembles London Virtuosi and the Gabrieli String Quartet as well as conductor for both the Bangkok Symphony Orchestra and the Malaysian Philharmonic Orchestra, and as Director of Orchestral Studies at the Royal Academy of Music.

== Early life ==
Georgiadis was born in Southend-on-Sea on 17 July 1939, growing up in the nearby town of Laindon. His father Alec was an amateur violinist and encouraged his son to master the instrument from the age of 6. During his childhood on a family holiday to Austria, his family met Willi Boskovsky, who on his visit to England visited and stayed in Laindon giving lessons to the young Georgiadis. He attended the Royal Academy of Music studying with Frederick Grinke and spent a year with René Benedetti.

== Musical career ==
In the late 1950s, a young Georgiadis had been the Concert Leader for Leslie Head and the Kensington Symphony Orchestra.

In 1963 Georgiadis joined the Birmingham Symphony Orchestra as Concert Leader. In 1965 he joined the London Symphony Orchestra as Concert Leader until his first departure in 1973. During this time he performed the first English performance of the Menotti Violin Concerto, and the first London performance of the Bartok Violin Concerto No.1. In 1972, along with Anthony Camden (oboe), Douglas Cummings (cello) and James Galway (flute) formed the London Virtuosi Chamber Ensemble, of which he was the musical director.

In 1974, Georgiadis left the London Symphony Orchestra and started to teach with the Royal Liverpool Philharmonic Orchestra, where he started his conducting career. He played solo violinist with the Kensington Symphony Orchestra in a memorial concert to John Howard Davies live on BBC Radio London on the 25 July 1974. In 1976 he recorded the Bliss Concerto with the BBC Symphony Orchestra. In 1977 he returned to the London Symphony Orchestra as Concert Leader, where he met and worked with Sergiu Celibidache, a relationship that lasted for 8 years. On New Year's Day 1977, Georgiadis conducted the orchestra at the Royal Albert Hall, and continued the conductor role until 2015, in the Viennese style of his former mentor Willi Boskovsky. In 1979 Georgiadis left the LSO for a second time, but continued to guest as a soloist and a conductor. While touring with the Orchestra he recorded their trips on a movie camera. On the 15 March 1980 he conducted the BBC Concert Orchestra as part of the February Festival for BBC Radio 2's Saturday Night is Gala Night.

In 1982 he become the music director for the Bristol Sinfonia, where he remained until 1984. From 1982 he was the principal conductor of the Essex Youth Orchestra, a position he held for 11 years. In 1987 he joined the Gabrieli Quartet, where he was the first violinist, until he left in 1990. In 1989 he joined the Royal Academy of Music as the Director of Orchestral Studies, a position he held until 1992. During his time with the Academy he worked as a guest conductor at the Queensland Symphony Orchestra.

In 1992 he was approached by the Bangkok Symphony Orchestra, of which in 1994 he became its music director and conductor, and later became a regular guest conductor at the Malaysian Philharmonic Orchestra, an orchestra he helped set up. He continued to guest conduct with orchestras around the world.

Georgiadis toured as a recital duet with Andy Peebles from 1988 to 1999. He quit playing music professionally in the early 2000s. In 1999 he was asked by Kulthorn Silapabanleng, son of Thai composer Prasidh Silapabanleng to complete his composition The Prelude Of Siam, which Georgiadis did on the 4 September 1999. Unfortunately Prasidh had died the month before.

Georgiadis was an honorary member of the Johann Strauss Society of Great Britain for whom he was archives guardian and librarian. In 1989 he conducted the London Symphony Orchestra in recording Johann Strauss and Family in London for the silver jubilee of the organisation.

== Literary, acting and television career ==
In 1979 Georgiadis appeared as a judge on the Thames Television programme, Fanfare for Young Musicians.

In 2013 Georgiadis played the part of Bill, a member of the string section, in the British film Quartet.

He launched his autobiography Bow to Baton: A Leader’s Life in 2019. In the book he revealed he was not a fan of Andre Previn, whom he worked with at the London Symphony Orchestra.

== Discography ==
- 1975 - Elgar - John Georgiadis, John Parry - Music For Violin And Piano
- 1976 - London Symphony Orchestra, John Georgiadis – The Magic of Strauss
- 1976 - John Georgiadis, Susan Georgiadis – Gipsy Carnival
- 1977 - John Georgiadis, Susan Georgiadis – Hora Staccato
- 1978 - The Johann Strauss Orchestra, John Georgiadis – A Strauss Family Gala
- 1978 - The London Symphony Orchestra Conducted From The Violin Of John Georgiadis – The Blue Danube Waltz
- 1978 - John Georgiadis - Susan Georgiadis – Moto Perpetuo
- 1979 - Moeran - John Georgiadis, London Symphony Orchestra, Vernon Handley – Violin Concerto
- 1979 - The Strauss Family: Vienna Dances
- 1986 - Johann Strauss I/ Johann Strauss II/ Josef Strauss/ London Symphony Orchestra, John Georgiadis – An Evening Of Strauss
- 1988 - The London Symphony Orchestra - Conductor: John Georgiadis – An Evening In Vienna
- 1989 - The London Symphony Orchestra, John Georgiadis – Johann Strauss And Family In London
- 1993 - Albinoni – The London Virtuosi, Anthony Camden, John Georgiadis – Oboe Concerti Op. 9, Nos. 2, 3, 5, 8, 9 & 11
- 1994 - Weber - Queensland Philharmonic Orchestra, John Georgiadis – Symphonies Nos. 1 & 2 • Turandot • Silvana • Die Drei Pintos
- 1995 - Albinoni - Anthony Camden, Alison Alty, The London Virtuosi, John Georgiadis – Oboe Concerti Vol. 2
- 1995 - Albinoni, Anthony Camden, Alison Alty, The London Virtuosi, John Georgiadis – Oboe Concerti Vol. 3
- 1997 - Johann Strauss - London Symphony Orchestra, John Georgiadis – A New Year Concert
- 1997 - John Georgiadis – Strauss A Viennese Collection London Symphony Orchestra
- 1998 - Fauré - RTE Sinfonietta, John Georgiadis - Orchestral Music
- 1999 - The Strauss Family in London
- 2015 - Czibulka, Fahrbach Jr., Fetrás, Gung'l, Hellmesberger Jr., Ivanovici, Lanner, Lincke, Millöcker, Schmid, Schrammel, Ziehrer, Czech Chamber Philharmonic Orchestra Pardubice, John Georgiadis – Contemporaries Of The Strauss Family Vol. 1
- 2015 - Ivanovici, Lincke, Zeller, Fucik, Komzák, Suppé, Rosas, Hellmesberger, Labitzky, Fetrás, Schrammel, Czech Chamber Philharmonic Orchestra Pardubice, John Georgiadis – Contemporaries Of The Strauss Family - Volume 2
- 2017 - Eduard Strauss I, Czech Chamber Philharmonic Orchestra Paradubice, John Georgiadis – A Centenary Celebration
- 2017 - Czibulka, Eilenberg, Fahrbach, Jr, Fučík, Heuberger, Kéler, Labitzky, Lincke, Millöcker, Pazeller, Vollstedt, J.F. Wagner, Czech Chamber Philharmonic Orchestra Paradubice, John Georgiadis – Contemporaries Of The Strauss Family Vol. 3
- 2019 - Eduard Strauss I, Czech Philharmonic Chamber Orchestra Pardubice, John Georgiadis – A Centenary Celebration Vol. 2
- 2019 - Contemporaries of the Strauss Family, Vol. 4

== Personal life ==
Georgiadis was born to parents Alec and Pat in 1939. He had an interest in website building, redesigning the Deal Festival site as well as designing Viennese Music Library (archives of the Johann Strauss Society of Great Britain) and Musicians Gallery.

In 1961 Georgiadis married Susan Salter, a viola player and pianist. They toured and recorded together performing Gypsy music. She died in 2006. They had three children. His second wife was Monica Mollerstrom and they lived in the town of Deal.

In 2019 he underwent surgery to remove a brain tumor. Georgiadis died on 5 January 2021.
