= Anthony Camden =

British oboist and academic administrator

- Born: 26 April 1938; London, England, UK
- Died: 7 March 2006 (aged 67–68)
- Education: Royal College of Music
- Occupations: Oboist; Academic administrator
- Organizations: Northern Sinfonia Orchestra; City of Birmingham Symphony Orchestra; London Symphony Orchestra; Queensland Conservatorium of Music; Hong Kong Academy for Performing Arts
- Parent(s): Joyce and Archie Camden

Anthony Camden (26 April 1938 – 7 March 2006) was the principal oboe and chairman of the board at the London Symphony Orchestra. He was also a founding member of the ensemble London Virtuosi and went on to become the provost and director of the Queensland Conservatorium of Music in Brisbane, before becoming the dean of music at the Hong Kong Academy for Performing Arts. He was affectionately known as the Whizzer in the world of classical music.

== Early life ==
Camden was born in London to parents Archie and Joyce Camden (born Jan Kerrison) in April 1938. Archie Camden was a celebrated bassoonist with the BBC Symphony Orchestra while Joyce was a cellist, pianist and composer. During World War II, the family moved first to Bristol and then Bedford, due to the orchestra being relocated. While in Bedford, the young Camden fell ill twice with double pneumonia and serious attacks of asthma.

The family returned to London, where Camden attended Highgate School. His initial musical instruments were the piano and violin, for which he was given instruction by Isolde Menges. At the age of 14, Camden gave a solo concerto debut at the Royal Academy of Music. However, because of his asthma issues he was recommend to try the oboe, in the belief that the breath control required to play the instrument would help his condition.

His first tutor on oboe was Evelyn Rothwell, before he joined the Royal College of Music (RCM), where he came under the tutorage of Terence MacDonagh. While at the RCM, Anthony Camden joined the Camden Trio, an ensemble started by his father Archie, Rothwell and pianist Wilfred Parry, which would later feature his older brother Kerry and Ian Lake.

== Musical career ==
After leaving the Royal College of Music, Camden became a founding member of the Northern Sinfonia Orchestra in 1960 and immediately became the Principal Oboe. In 1964, he joined as Principal Oboe the City of Birmingham Symphony Orchestra, which ended in 1972 when he joined the London Symphony Orchestra (LSO) as Principal Oboe, a position he held of 14 years. In 1975 he was elected to chairman of the Board of the LSO by his fellow musicians, a role he held until 1987 becoming the longest holder of the position.

During a tour with LSO in the United States, Camden tried to convince André Previn, the principal conductor of the orchestra, to write a film score for a then-unknown film being made called Star Wars. When Previn refused, Camden pushed him to give him the name of someone who would assist. Previn named John Williams. When Williams agreed after some persuasion, Camden immediately called Denham Studios in England and booked 18 sessions so the LSO could record the yet written score.

Some of Camden's highlights in this period include recording Carillons with the LSO in 1974, working as visiting professor at the Guildhall School of Music and Drama and forming the London Virtuosi with fellow LSO members John Georgiadis and James Galway.

In 1988, Camden left the London Symphony Orchestra and joined the Queensland Conservatorium of Music in Brisbane where he was the Provost and director, a position he would hold until 1993. During this time, he continued giving performances in Europe and Asia.

In 1993, he joined the Hong Kong Academy of Performing Arts as the dean of the School of Music, a position he held until his retirement in 2003. During his tenure, the academic standing of the institution was raised and the profile increased internationally.

During the 1990s he recorded, either with London Vituosi or the City of London Sinfonia, 36 concertos largely by Italian composers. He is one of the most recorded oboists.

After his retirement in 2003, Camden continued to be a consultant to music institutions and festivals.

== Discography ==
- 1982 - Yehudi Menuhin, Jin Li / Anthony Camden / London Symphony Orchestra* - Bach: Violin Concerto In E; Concerto For Two Violins; Concerto For Violin And Oboe
- 1993 - Albinoni - Anthony Camden, The London Virtuosi, John Georgiadis - Oboe Concerti Op. 9, Nos. 2, 3, 5, 8, 9 & 11
- 1995 - Albinoni - Anthony Camden, Alison Alty, The London Virtuosi, John Georgiadis - Oboe Concerti Vol. 2
- 1995 - Albinoni - Anthony Camden, Alison Alty, The London Virtuosi, John Georgiadis - Oboe Concerti Vol. 3
- 1996 - Handel, Anthony Camden, Julia Girdwood, City Of London Sinfonia, Nicholas Ward - Oboe Concertos Nos. 1 - 3, Air And Rondo, Suite, Overture To "Otho"
- 1996 - Corelli, Bellini, Cimarosa, Fiorillo, Righini, Barbirolli, Anthony Camden, Julia Girdwood, City Of London Sinfonia, Nicholas Ward - Italian Oboe Concertos
- 2001 - Salieri, Platti, Besozzi, Rosetti, Anthony Camden, City Of London Sinfonia, Nicholas Ward - Italian Oboe Concertos Vol. 2

== Personal life ==
Camden met his first wife, Diane Lewis, while working for the City of Birmingham Symphony Orchestra. He had two children from this marriage, Andrew and Colette. He married his second wife, Lilly Li, in 1993 and they had a daughter together called Sasha.
