= The Parlour =

Opera by Grace Williams

- Comic opera by Grace Williams
- Language: English
- Based on: "En famille", short story by Guy de Maupassant
- Premiere: 5 May 1966; New Theatre, Cardiff

The Parlour is the only opera by the Welsh composer Grace Williams; a comic opera in one act, it is based on a short story by Guy de Maupassant. Although written in 1961, it was not performed in public until 1966.

Maupassant's "En famille" (1881) deals with the Caravan family and the events that occur following the presumed death of Mr Caravan's 90-year-old mother, who is in fact alive. Grace Williams transferred the location to a Victorian seaside resort. In adapting the short story as an opera, Williams displays "considerable gifts of staging". She was hindered in her early plans to write an opera by the fact that Wales had no opera house of its own and no dedicated orchestra (the Welsh National Opera Company was formed in 1946). She also doubted whether Welsh audiences would appreciate it.

The première, on 5 May 1966, took place at the New Theatre, Cardiff, where the City of Birmingham Symphony Orchestra was conducted by Bryan Balkwill. The cast included Edith Coates and Edward Byles in leading roles, Noreen Berry, John Gibbs, Anne Pashley and Janet Hughes. It was produced by John Moody, and Elizabeth Friendship's set design received praise from reviewers. However, the reviewer in Opera magazine dismissed the music as "feeble in content, too long, and mis-timed in its relation to the dramatic action". The BBC, broadcasting a recording made at the Odeon Theatre, Llandudno, in November of the same year, described the première as "highly successful", and said that the opera, despite being Williams' first, displays a "confident professionalism and the theatrical awareness".

In 2025 an archive recording of the 1966 live performance from Llandudno was issued on the Lyrita label.
