= Carillons (Williams) =

1965 composition by Grace Williams

- Concertino by Grace Williams
- Composed: 1965 (1973)
- Published: Curiad, Caernarfon
- Recorded: Anthony Camden; London Symphony Orchestra; Charles Groves; 1974

Premiere
- Date: 1 March 1967
- Conductor: Rae Jenkins
- Performers: BBC Welsh Orchestra, Philip Jones (oboe)

Carillons was composed by Grace Williams for oboe and symphony orchestra (but without woodwind instruments) in 1965 in response to a request from the BBC for a light, entertaining piece. Carillons originally included three movements but Williams revised the work in 1973, adding a fourth movement.

== Composition history ==
Grace Williams composed Carillons in 1965 from a commission by the BBC in Wales, who requested "something light-weight and entertaining" for the programme Auditorium. By omitting the usual orchestral woodwind section and making use of high-pitched percussion (triangle, glockenspiel, celesta, and tubular bells), Williams created a distinctive orchestral colour with bell-like sounds which inspired the title of the work (A carillon is musical instrument including a number of bells usually played with a keyboard, and originally from the French for bells or chimes).

Although completed in 1965 the premier was postponed to coincide with the official opening of the BBC's new studios at Llandaff on St David's Day, 1967. The work was premiered by Philip Jones (oboe) with the BBC Welsh Orchestra conducted by Rae Jenkins.

== Music ==
The piece is scored for solo oboe, 2 French horns, 2 trumpets, 3 trombones, percussion (including triangle, glockenspiel, celesta, and tubular bells), harp, and strings (violins, violas, cellos, and double bass).

It comprises four movements:

1. Moderato con moto
2. Allegretto alla pavana
3. Lento rapsodico
4. Allegro agitato

The third movement was added in 1973 and is in the style of an unaccompanied cadenza which adds to the soloistic display of the piece.

== Publication ==
Carillons has been published by Curiad, Caernarfon.

== Recordings ==
Carillons was recorded by Anthony Camden (oboe) with the London Symphony Orchestra conducted by David Atherton in 1974 (His Master's Voice ASD3006), and re-issued in 1995 (Lyrita SRCD323). The recording was one of a series of recordings of Williams' works in the 1970s to promote her work, made with the help of the Welsh Arts Council.
