= Alexander Gilman =

German musician and violinist

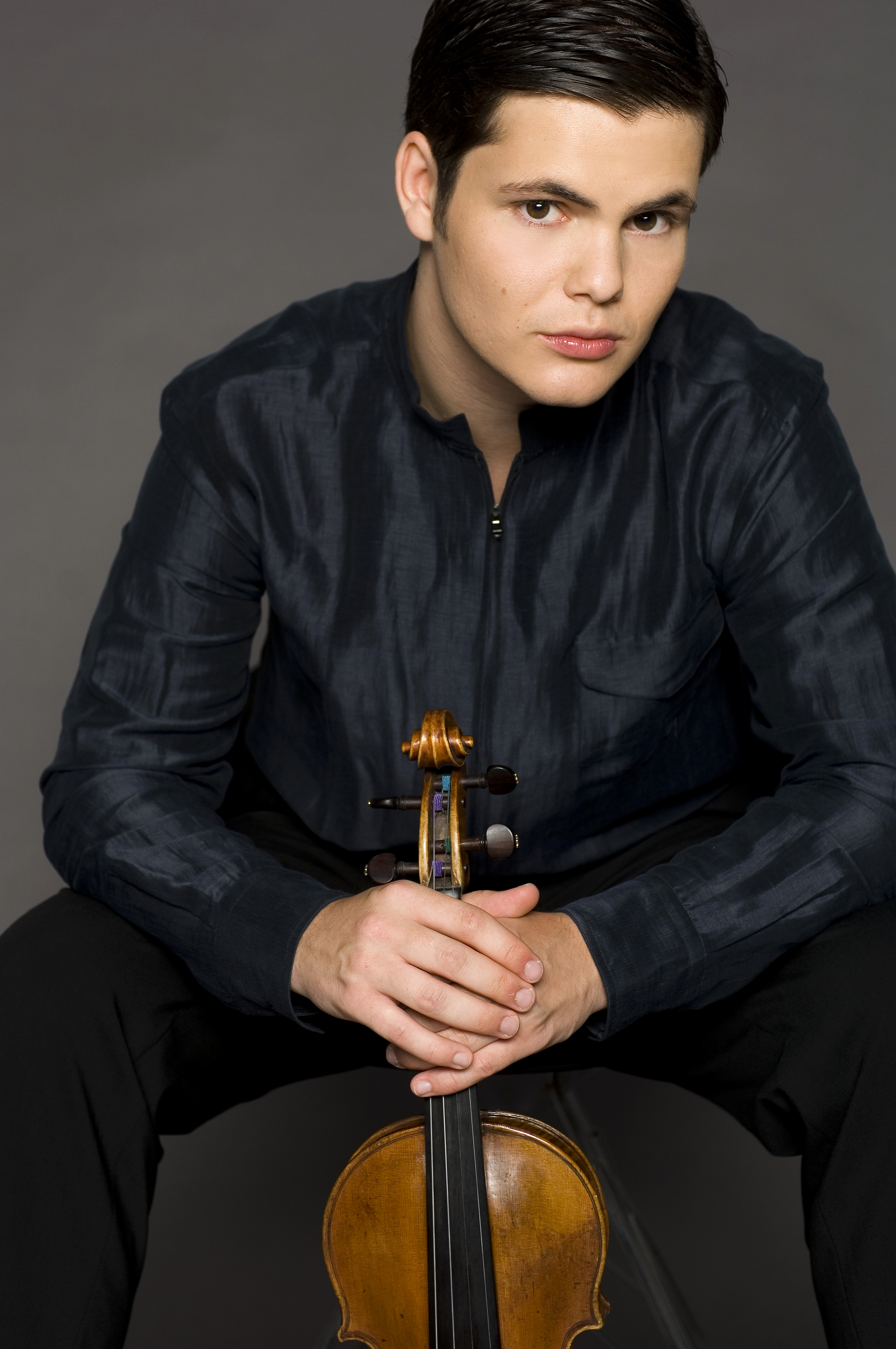
- Alexander Gilman

Background information
- Born: September 16, 1982; Bamberg, Upper Franconia, Germany
- Genres: classical music, Baroque, contemporary compositions
- Occupation: violinist
- Years active: 1989–present
- Labels: Sony Music; Naxos (company); Oehms Classics
- Website: www.alexandergilman.com

Alexander Gilman is a German violinist, academic teacher and artistic director of the LGT Young Soloists. He has been performing internationally as a soloist and chamber musician and regularly conducting masterclasses.

== Early life and education ==
Alexander Gilman was born on September 16, 1982, in Bamberg, Upper Franconia, Germany. He grew up in a Jewish-Russian family of musicians and began learning violin at the age of six. Gilman gave his debut performance at the Gasteig, Munich at seven. Beginning in 1998, he attended masterclasses of Dorothy DeLay, Itzhak Perlman, Aaron Rosand, Igor Ozim, Akiko Tatsumi, Mikhail Kopelman and Zakhar Bron. In the summer of 2000, he entered Musikhochschule Köln masterclass of the violin professor Zakhar Bron and later achieved his master's degree at Zurich University of the Arts.

== Musical career ==
Gilman gained first international media visibility in June 2006 when he won the "WestLB Music Competition" and was presented the Stradivari violin by Frank Peter Zimmermann.

=== Performances ===
Gilman performs regularly as a soloist and chamber musician. His most notable concert performances include Berliner Philharmonie, Kölner Philharmonie, Musikverein, Shanghai Concert Hall Minato Mirai Hall and more. During his career, he has collaborated with conductors such as Neeme Jarvi, Michael Sanderling, Dan Ettinger, Bernard Haitink, Mario Venzago, Eri Klas and Perry So.

=== Teaching ===
In 2019 Gilman was appointed visiting professor for violin at the Royal College of Music in London. Since 2014 he is also teaching at Kalaidos University of Applied Sciences (the Department of Music) in Switzerland. In 2010-2013 he taught at Zurich University of the Arts as a Professor Assistant of Zakhar Bron.

=== LGT Young Soloists ===
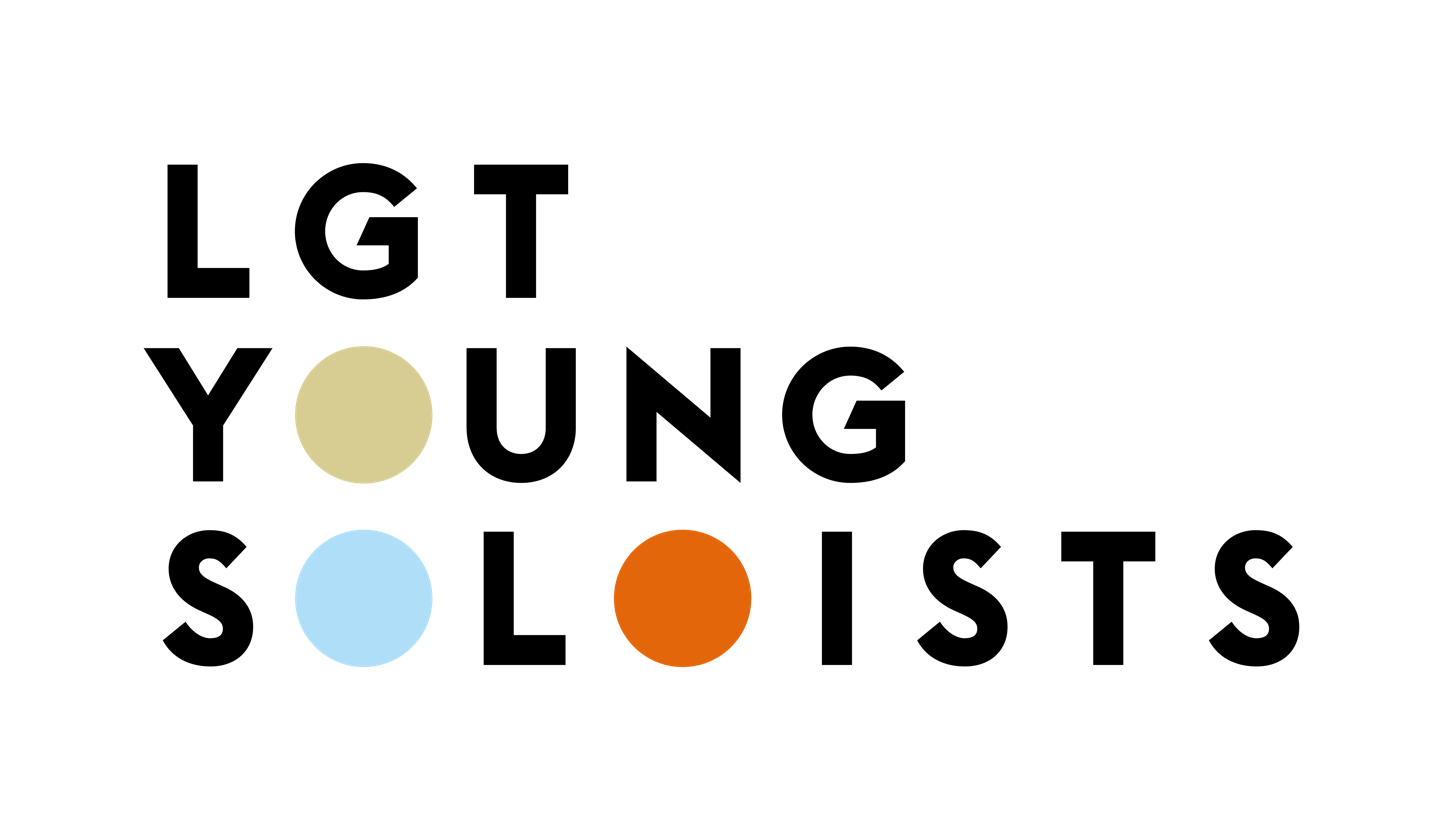
LGT Young Soloists

In 2013 Gilman founded LGT Young Soloists orchestra for highly gifted young soloists aged 12 to 30. The foundation had been created with the main goal to support young talents by giving them opportunity to perform on the concert stages. The LGT Young Soloists has been the first youth orchestra to record for RCA/Sony Music. The ensemble performed in a number of concert halls locations including Musikverein Vienna, Elbphilharmonie Hamburg, Berliner Philharmonie, Mozarteum Salzburg, Victoria Hall Singapore and many more. Since their founding, the LGT Young Soloists have been appearing regularly at the concert halls of the metropolitan centers such as New York, Beijing, Shanghai, Dubai, Moscow, Paris and Tel Aviv.

== Selected works ==
- Beethoven RECOMPOSED with the LGT Young Soloists, a world premiere recording featuring two of the most monumental chamber music works of Ludwig van Beethoven – the Kreutzer Sonata Op. 47 and the Cello Sonata Op. 69 – in new arrangements with string orchestra accompaniment. Released in 2020 on Naxos.
- Nordic Dream with the LGT Young Soloists including works by Dag Wiren, Anton Arensky, Michael Glinka, Sergei Rachmaninoff and Nikolai Rimsky-Korsakov. Released in 2018 on Sony Music.
- Russian Soul with the LGT Young Soloists including works by Pyotr Ilyich Tchaikovsky, Kurt Atterberg, Jean Sibelius, Ole Bull, Christian Sinding, Johan Svendsen, Johan Halvorsen and Jan Alm. Released in 2017 on Sony Music.
- Volume 1, Live In Concert DVD with the LGT Young Soloists. Recorded live at St. Christoph am Arlberg, Austria. Released on C-Major in 2017.
- Italian Journey with the LGT Young Soloists including works by Nicolo Paganini, Ennio Morricone, Pietro Mascagni, Ottorino Respighi and Giuseppe Tartini. Released in 2015 on Sony Music.
- Violin concertos by Erich Wolfgang Korngold and Samuel Barber, Carmen Fantasy by Franz Waxman and the Thema from Steven Spielberg box office hit Schindler's List by John Williams. Recorded in Cape Town with the Cape Town Philharmonic Orchestra under the baton of Perry So. Released in 2012 on the label OehmsClassics.
- Debut CD with works by Johannes Brahms, Sergei Prokofiev, Henryk Wieniawski, Stephen Foster, recorded with pianist Marina Seltenreich at Bavarian Broadcasting, BR for the label Oehms Classics (Juni 2007).

== Instruments ==
In 2006, after winning WestLB Music Competition in Düsseldorf, Gilman was presented the Stradivari "Ex-Croall" (dating from 1684) by Frank Peter Zimmermann, who had previously played this instrument. Gilman also plays a violin made by Ferdinando Gagliano (the last violin maker from the Gagliano family) in 1795, an instrument provided by the Fahrenkamp-Schäffler Foundation.

== Awards and recognition ==
- 2019: Award for Best Teaching 2019 by the Kalaidos Music University, Switzerland
- 2019: Three nominations for the Opus Klassik
- 2014: Best Teacher Award at "Talents for Europe" Music Competition
- 2013: Diapason d'Or for the Barber/Korngold/Waxman/Williams CD
- 2008: Scholar of the Deutsche Stiftung Musikleben (German Foundation for Musical Life)
- 2006: 1st Prize in the form of a fine violin by Antonio Stradivari at the WestLB Music Competition, Düsseldorf
- 2003: Prize winner at the International Young Violin Competition, Greece
- 1997: 1st Prize at the Summit Music Festival Competition, New York
- 1994: Named Honorary Citizen of Gräfelfing, Munich
