= Carillon, Richmond, Virginia =

Neighbourhood of Richmond, Virginia

Coordinates: 37°32′22″N 77°29′03″W

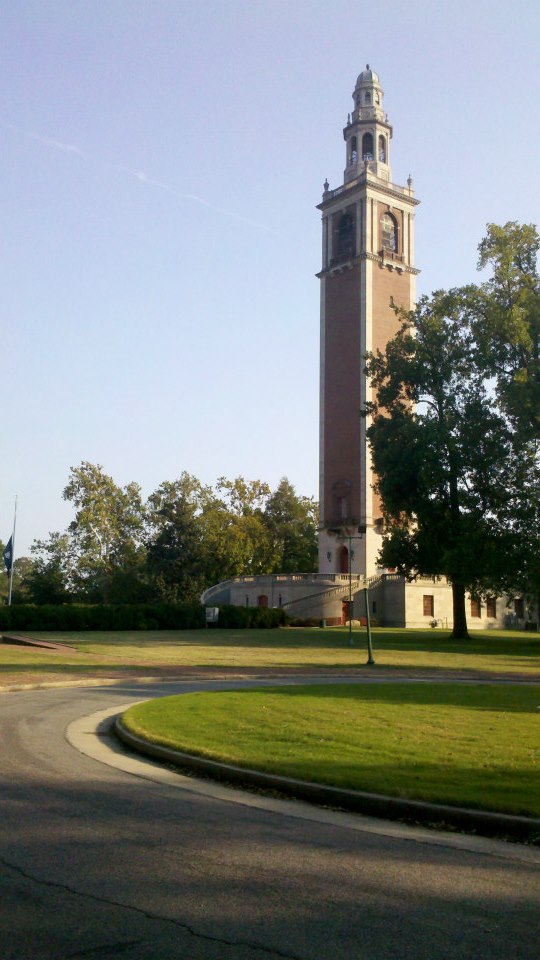
The Carillon tower, after which the community is named

Carillon is a neighborhood in the West End of Richmond that is situated in between Virginia State Route 146 and 161. Adjacent to Maymont and Byrd Park, the middle-class neighborhood is home to the Dogwood Dell Amphitheater. Pump House Drive and Rugby Road are the arteries of the southern tier of the community, while Douglasdale Avenue and South Belmont Drive form the spin of the northern portions of Carillon.

The neighborhood is named after the city's carillon (built 1932), which is the 20th-tallest structure in the city limits.

== See also ==
- Neighborhoods of Richmond, Virginia
- West End (Richmond, Virginia)
