= David Wynne (composer) =

Welsh composer

David Wynne (2 June 1900 – 23 March 1983) was a prolific Welsh composer, who taught for many years at Cardiff University and wrote much of his best-known music in retirement.

== Life and career ==
Christened David William Thomas, he was born at Nantmoch Uchaf farm in Penderyn, a village near Hirwaun, the son of a shepherd named Philip Thomas and his wife Elizabeth. The following year, the family moved to Llanfabon, near Cilfynydd, where he attended the local school until the age of 12. For the next two years he worked at a local grocer's shop, then at the age of 14 he went down the pit at the Albion Colliery, Cilfynydd, where one of Britain's worst mining disasters had occurred in 1894. He continued to work there until the age of 25, even after beginning lessons with a local music teacher and organist, Tom Llewellyn Jenkins, himself a minor composer. In 1925 he was awarded a Glamorgan Scholarship to University College, Cardiff, becoming a pupil of Professor David Evans and John Morgan Lloyd; he obtained a B.Mus. degree in 1928. From there he proceeded to the University of Bristol, where he spent a year in teacher training. In 1929 he was appointed Head of Music at Lewis School Pengam, a grammar school for boys, becoming the first full-time secondary school music teacher in Wales. His students at Pengam included composers Robert Smith and Mervyn Burtch. In 1933, he married Eirwen Evans and they settled in Maesycwmmer. In 1938 the University of Wales awarded him a D.Mus. In 1944 he was awarded the Clements Memorial Prize for his First String Quartet, and this effectively launched his career as a leading composer; thereafter he received regular commissions. At the same time, he began using the name David Wynne for professional purposes. He retired from school teaching in 1960. From 1961 to 1971 he taught composition at Cardiff College of Music and Drama (now the Royal Welsh College of Music & Drama), and from 1970 to 1979 in the Department of Music at Cardiff University. In 1983, he died suddenly at his home in Pencoed, whilst working on his Fourth Symphony.

== Compositions ==
Wynne's first symphony, written in 1952, was never performed. His second, in 1956, was only the second work ever commissioned by the Welsh Music Guild. One of his best-known orchestral works, the Third Symphony, was written in 1963 for the Caerffili Festival, and inspired by Caerphilly Castle, its structure based on the castle's concentric design; it was premièred by the Bournemouth Symphony Orchestra, conducted by Sir Michael Tippett. His gentler and more lyrical side emerged in his Fantasia for Piano and Orchestra, which Martin Jones premiered with the Cardiff University Orchestra in 1972.

One of Wynne's earliest successes as a composer was his String Quartet No.1 in February, 1945. It won the A. J. Clements Composition Prize and brought him into contact with Michael Tippett, who remained a friend and supporter. It was the first of five quartets, spanning the years 1944 to 1980. There were also many sonatas including four solo piano sonatas (1947 rev. 1952, 1956, 1966 and 1966). Eiluned Davies premiered the Piano Sonata No 2 in 1957.

The Welsh language had an influence on his composition that was both subtle and profound. The speech rhythms of Welsh poetry permeate his instrumental music, its melodic inflections often consciously influenced by the hwyl of the Welsh preachers that he heard in his youth. Many of his vocal works are settings of early and mediaeval Welsh poetry for which he seems to have had an especial affinity. In Owain ab Urien, a cantata for male voice choir with brass and percussion, he set some of the earliest Welsh poetry, written in the 6th century. This work was also commissioned by the Welsh Music Guild, whose president at the time was Sir Michael Tippett, in memory of its founder, John Edwards; and first performed at the Festival Hall in London in 1967 by the Pendyrus Male Voice Choir under its late director Glynne Jones and the Philip Jones brass ensemble. It was performed again by Risca Male Voice Choir in 2000, as part of Wynne's centenary celebrations.

The David Wynne and Eirwen Thomas Memorial Award was launched in 2006, in association with the Welsh Music Guild, under the terms of David Wynne's will, to advance the careers of student composers, the first recipient being Gareth Churchill.

== Selected works ==
See also Welsh Music Library

=== Opera ===
- Jack and Jill (1975)
- Night and Cold Peace (1978)
- Cain (1981)

Orchestral

- Symphony No.1 (1952); unperformed
- Elegy for string orchestra (1953)
- Berceuse for string orchestra (1954)
- Prelude, Air and Dance (1955)
- Symphony No.6 (1955)
- Symphony No.2 (1956); commissioned by the Guild for the Promotion of Welsh Music
- Fantasia No.1 (1957); commissioned by the National Youth Orchestra of Wales
- Sinfonietta for string orchestra (1958)
- A Welsh Suite (1961)
- Symphony No.3 (1963); premiered at the Caerphilly Festival
- Symphony No.4; incomplete
- Cymric Rhapsody No.1 (1965)
- Prelude (1968)
- Cymric Rhapsody No.2 (1969)
- Divertimento for string orchestra (1974)
- Octad (1977)
- Songs for string orchestra
- Three Pieces for Orchestra

Concertante

- Rhapsody No.1 for violin and orchestra (1957)
- Fantasia Concerto for viola and orchestra (1961)
- Fantasia Concerto for 2 pianos (3 hands) and orchestra (1962); unperformed
- Fantasia for piano and orchestra (1972)

Chamber music

- String Quartet No.1 (1944)
- String Trio (1945)
- Piano Trio No.1 (1946)
- Sonatina for viola and piano (1946)
- Sonata No.1 for violin and piano (1948)
- Sonata for viola and piano (1951)
- Five Short Pieces for clarinet and piano (1956)
- Sonata for trombone and piano (1956)
- Sonata for trumpet and piano (1956)
- Sonata No.2 for violin and piano (1957)
- Quintet for clarinet and string quartet (1959)
- Septet for flute, clarinet, bassoon and string quartet (1961)
- String Quartet No.3 (1966)
- Mosaic for percussion ensemble (1968)
- Piano Trio No.2 (1968)
- Duo for cello and piano (1970)
- Quartet for violin, viola, cello and piano (1971)
- String Quartet No.4 (1972)
- Sextet for woodwind quintet and piano (1977)
- Sonatina for violin and piano (1978)
- Music for percussion ensemble (1979)
- String Quartet No.5 (1980)
- Quartet for oboe, viola, cello and double bass (1982)
- Divertimento for 2 trumpets and 2 trombones
- Postlude for 3 trumpets

Harp

- Prelude and Dance (1963)
- Music (1966)
- Suite of Six Bagatelles

Organ

- Sonata (1965)
- Fanfare (1972)
- Three Short Pieces (1973)

Piano

- Sonata No.1 (1947)
- Rondo Capriccioso for 2 pianos (1952)
- Sonata No.2 (1956)
- Suite of Three Pieces
- Variations and Capriccio for 2 pianos (1965)
- Sonata No.3 (1966)
- Sonata No.4 (1966)
- Six Studies (1973)
- Four Welsh Folk Tunes
- Six Miniatures

Vocal

- Songs of Solitude for high voice and string orchestra with piano (1941)
- Two Songs from a Child's Garden for high voice and piano (1941)
- Y môr ynghwsg (The Sleeping Sea) for high voice and piano (1941)
- 6 Chân i denor a thelyn (6 Songs) for tenor and harp (1950)
- Ebb and Flow for high voice and chamber ensemble (1960)
- Coming Forth by Day for voice and piano (1964)
- Evening Shadows for voice and piano (1971)
- Night-Music for soprano, string quartet and piano (1974)
- Aubade for voice and piano
- A Cradle Song for voice and piano
- Hwiangerdd Wyddelig (Irish Lullaby) for high voice and piano
- Nocturne for low voice and piano
- O rosyn, dos (Go, Lovely Rose) for tenor and piano
- To Music for low voice and piano

Choral

- Night Watch formixed chorus and orchestra (1957)
- Four Songs from the Chinese for female chorus (1963)
- Y gelynnen (The Holly) for female chorus and piano (1963)
- Great Is the Lord for mixed chorus and organ (1967)
- Stafell Gynddylan for mixed chorus (1967)
- Gwirebau (Axioms) for chorus and piano (1969)
- Suite of Six Songs for youth choir and piano (1972)
- A Gwent Symphony "Wentwood Thorn" for female chorus and orchestra (1973)
- The Traveller for tenor and mixed chorus (1973)
- Geni Crist for mixed chorus and organ (1979)
- Two settings of Poems by William Blake for mixed chorus and harp (1980)
- Owain ab Urien, Cantata for male chorus and chamber ensemble
