= Grace Williams =

Welsh composer (1906–1977)

- Born: Grace Mary Williams; 19 February 1906; Barry, Glamorgan, Wales
- Died: 10 February 1977 (aged 70); Barry, Glamorgan, Wales
- Education: Cardiff University (when University of Wales, UCSWM); Royal College of Music
- Occupation: Composer

Grace Mary Williams (19 February 1906 – 10 February 1977) was a Welsh composer, generally regarded as Wales's most notable female composer, and the first British woman to score a feature film.

== Early life ==
Williams was born in Barry, Glamorgan, the daughter of William Matthews Williams and Rose Emily Richards Williams. Both of her parents were teachers; her father was also a noted musician. She learned piano and violin as a girl, playing piano trios with her father and her brother Glyn, and accompanying her father's choir. At the County School she began to develop her interest in composition under the guidance of the music teacher Miss Rhyda Jones, and in 1923 she won the Morfydd Owen scholarship to the University College of South Wales and Monmouthshire (now Cardiff University), where she studied under Professor David Evans. In 1926 she began studying at the Royal College of Music, London, where she was taught by Gordon Jacob and Ralph Vaughan Williams. Other notable female composers studying with Vaughan Williams at the RCM were Elizabeth Maconchy, Dorothy Gow and Imogen Holst, the daughter of Gustav Holst. In 1930 she was awarded a travelling scholarship, and chose to study with Egon Wellesz in Vienna, where she remained till 1931.

== Career ==
=== Teaching and World War II ===
From 1932 Williams taught in London, at Camden Girls' School and the Southlands College of Education. During the Second World War, the students were evacuated to Grantham in Lincolnshire, where she composed some of her earliest works, including the Sinfonia Concertante for piano and orchestra, and her First Symphony. One of her most popular works, Fantasia on Welsh Nursery Tunes (1940) was written during this period. Sea Sketches for string orchestra, written in 1944 is the first work in her mature style. This music is vividly evocative of the sea, in all its variety of moods. In 1945, she returned to her home town, remaining there for the rest of her life, dedicating herself more or less full-time to composition.

In 1949, she became the first British woman to score a feature film, with Blue Scar. In 1960–61 she wrote her only opera, The Parlour, which was not performed until 1966. In the 1967 New Year's Honours, she turned down an offer of the OBE for her services to music.

=== Works ===
Williams' most enduringly popular work is Penillion, written for the National Youth Orchestra of Wales in 1955. She revisited some of the same ideas in her Trumpet Concerto of 1963. Despite the tradition of choral music in Wales, Williams' portfolio of compositions were largely orchestral or instrumental pieces. Ballads for Orchestra of 1968, written for the National Eisteddfod, held that year in her home town, has all the colour and swagger of a mediaeval court.

Outstanding amongst her vocal works are her setting of the Latin hymn, Ave Maris Stella, for unaccompanied SATB (1973), and Six Poems by Gerard Manley Hopkins, for contralto and string sextet (1958). The cycle is book-ended by two of Hopkins' best-known poems, Pied Beauty and Windhover, her music perfectly matching the rhythmic subtlety of the texts. These are amongst her most beautiful pieces, the soft melodic and harmonic undulations in Ave Maris Stella (Hail, Star of the Sea) suggesting as so often in her music the swelling of the ever-present sea. Welsh-language settings include Saunders Lewis's carol Rhosyn Duw, for SATB, piano and viola (1955), which she later incorporated into her large-scale choral work, Missa Cambrensis (1971).

Her last completed works (1975) were settings of Kipling and Beddoes for the unusual combination of SATB, harp and two horns. The last music she wrote is actually in her Second Symphony, originally composed in 1956, and substantially revised in 1975.

=== Recordings ===
The first commercial recordings began to emerge in the 1970s on discs issued by EMI, Decca and the BBC Artium label, including recordings of the Second Symphony, Fairest of Stars, Penillion, Sea Sketches and Fantasia on Welsh Nursery Tunes. These were later re-issued on two compilations by Lyrita in 2004. Several choral works, including The Dancers (1951) and the unaccompanied Ave Maris Stella, were recorded for a Chandos Records collection in 1998, conducted by Richard Hickox. Ballads for Orchestra (1969) was recorded by the BBC Symphony Orchestra under the direction of Baldur Brönnimann and was included in Volume 15, No 3 of BBC Music Magazine in 2006. The Symphony No 1 (1943) was performed by the BBC National Orchestra of Wales conducted by Owain Arwel Hughes in a 3 March 2008 broadcast.

An album of Williams' chamber music played by the violinist Madeleine Mitchell and the London Chamber Ensemble, including the Violin Sonata (1930), Sextet (1931) and Suite for nine instruments (1934), was released in 2019. In January 2024 the BBC Philharmonic Orchestra under conductor John Andrews made the first studio recordings of Legend of Rhiannon (1939), Ballads for Orchestra and Castel Caenarfon (1969), for release later in 2024 on Resonus Classics. Also in 2024 an album of 29 of her songs was released in premiere recordings, including Stand forth, Seithenin, Fairground and her setting of Lights Out by Edward Thomas. Siân Philipps and Per Rundber released a new recording of the Violin Sonata in July 2024.

The first commercial recording of the Missa Cambrensis, one of her last works, was issued in 2025 by Lyrita. Over an hour long, it is scored for SATB soloists and choir, a narrator, a children’s choir and large orchestra. The performance is by the BBC National Orchestra and Chorus of Wales, conductor Adrian Partington. In 2025 the first recording of her opera The Parlour was released by Lyrita - an archive recording of the live performance from the Odeon Theatre, Llandudno in August 1966.

=== Legacy ===
BBC Radio 3 devoted their "Composer of the Week" segment to her during the second week of August 2006, the year of the centenary of her birth. This resulted in several new performances of long-unperformed works, including her Violin Concerto (1950) and her Sinfonia Concertante for piano and orchestra (1941).

March 2016 saw both the premiere modern performances of her large-scale Missa Cambrensis for soloists, chorus and orchestra (1971) and of her symphonic suite Four Illustrations for the Legend of Rhiannon (1939–40).

== Personal life ==
During and after World War II, Williams experienced depression and other stress-related health problems. Grace Williams died at the age of 70 in February 1977, in Barry.

== Principal works ==
- Two Psalms for contralto, harp and strings (1927)
- Phantasy Quintet for piano and string quartet (1928; 2nd prize at the Cobbett Competition)
- Hen Walia, Overture for orchestra (1930)
- Sonata for violin and piano (1930; rev. 1938)
- Sextet for oboe, trumpet, violin, viola, cello and piano (c. 1931)
- Sonatina for flute and piano (1931)
- Suite for orchestra (1932)
- Concert Overture (c. 1932)
- Movement for Trumpet and chamber orchestra (1932)
- Suite for nine instruments (flute, clarinet, trumpet, piano, two violins, viola, cello and double bass) (c. 1934)
- Theseus and Ariadne, ballet (1935)
- Elegy for string orchestra (1936; rev. 1940)
- Four Illustrations for the Legend of Rhiannon, for orchestra (1939)
- Fantasia on Welsh Nursery Tunes, for orchestra (1940)
- Sinfonia Concertante for piano and orchestra (1941)
- Symphony No. 1, in the form of Symphonic Impressions of the Glendower Scene in "Henry IV Part 1" (1943)
- Sea Sketches, for String orchestra (1944)
- Piano Concerto (unfinished; one movement only) (1949)
- The Dark Island, Suite for string orchestra (1949)
- Violin Concerto (1950)
- Variations on a Swedish Tune The Shoemaker for Piano and Orchestra (1950)
- The Dancers, choral suite (1951)
- Hiraeth, for harp (1951)
- Three Nocturnes, for two pianos (1953)
- Seven Scenes for Young Listeners, for orchestra (1954)
- Penillion, for orchestra (1955)
- Symphony No. 2 (1956; rev. 1975)
- All Seasons shall be Sweet (1959)
- The Parlour, opera (after Guy de Maupassant) (1961)
- Processional for orchestra (1962; rev. 1968)
- Trumpet Concerto (1963)
- Carillons, for oboe and orchestra (1965; rev. 1973)
- Severn Bridge Variations (collective work) : Variation V (1966)
- Ballads for Orchestra (1968)
- Billows of the Sea, song cycle (1969)
- Castell Caernarfon, for orchestra (1969)
- Missa Cambrensis (1971)
- Ave Maris Stella, for SATB chorus a cappella (1973)
- Fairest of Stars, for soprano and orchestra (1973)
