= Mansel Thomas =

Welsh composer

Mansel Treharne Thomas, OBE (12 June 1909 – 8 January 1986) was a Welsh composer and conductor, who worked mainly in South Wales. He was one of the most influential musicians of his generation, known as a composer, conductor and adjudicator. He was for many years employed by the BBC and promoted the careers of many composers and performers. He himself wrote vocal, choral (mixed, female, children's and male voices), instrumental (solo and chamber), band and orchestral music, specialising in setting songs and poetry. Many of his orchestral and chamber music pieces are based on Welsh folk songs and dances.

== Biography ==
He was born on 12 June 1909 in Pontygwaith near Tylorstown, Rhondda, in a house in Llywellyn Street, where a plaque was later placed by the Rhondda Civic Society. At the age of sixteen, he won a scholarship to the Royal Academy of Music, where he studied under Benjamin Dale.

He joined the BBC in 1936, but interrupted his career to serve in World War II.

From 1946 until 1965 he was principal conductor of the BBC Welsh Orchestra, now the BBC National Orchestra of Wales, and the BBC Welsh Chorus, but his career ended after he suffered a stroke in 1979. He retired to Monmouthshire and was co-founder of the Llantilio Crossenny Festival of Music and Drama.

He died at Gilwern, Monmouthshire in 1986, at the age of 76 and is buried at the church of St Mary's Church, Magor.

The Mansel Thomas Trust, based in Ponthir, was established in 1987 to commemorate the composer. It is concerned mainly with collecting his works and making them available to musicians.

== Compositions ==
Mansel Thomas's composing career spanned almost 60 years and fell approximately into three periods: up to and including World War II, 1946 to his early retirement in 1965 and 1965–1979.

His first notable composition – "Daffodils"/"Cennin Aur" – was written in the mid-1920s for the newly formed Pendyrus Choir, which rehearsed next to his home in Tylorstown. The partsong became so well known that W. S. Gwynn Williams (Gwynn Publishers) requested a mixed choir version of it for publication in 1939, and this version surpassed in popularity its "TTBB" original.

Songs and choral music are the elements by which he is chiefly known today. There are over 150 songs and traditional-melody arrangements for solo voice and these include "Y Bardd", "Coeden afalau", "Caneuon y Misoedd" and "Eifionydd". The choral works involve various groups – male, mixed, female and youth/children – and are notable not only for "Daffodils" (TTBB & SATB), but also TTBB settings of Welsh hymn tunes and airs (such as "Llanfair", "Llef" and "Fantasia on Welsh Airs") and the fine original work "Psalm 35"; also a range of exciting works for SATB, such as "Requiem", "In Praise of Wisdom" and the anthem "For Thy Servant David". The compositions for female and youth/children's choirs engage the singers in varied groupings – Unison/SS/SA/SSA/SSAA/ etc. – and include the "Three Songs of Enchantment", "Six Elizabethan Partsongs" and traditional "Songs of Britain". However, he wrote for amateurs as well as professional performers, and notably for children and young people.

His chamber-works, especially the arrangements of Welsh traditional melodies, enjoyed popularity during their 1950s' BBC broadcasts by the Tâf Players, as did the "Six Orchestral Dances" and "Breton Suite" performed by the BBC Welsh Orchestra and the "Mini Variations on a Welsh Theme" written for Harry Mortimer and his Fairey Brass Band. These works are still popular with younger ensembles, including the National Youth Orchestra of Wales.

The recent availability of his works in publication has done much to regenerate interest and inspire performances not only in Wales but more widely in the UK and internationally in Europe, United States, Canada and Australia.

Mansel Thomas had two daughters, Sian and Grace, and his descendants are still active in promoting his work.

== Other sources ==
- Mansel Thomas (1909–1986): Tributes/Teyrngedau: Welsh Music/Cerddoriaeth Cymru: Spring/Gwanwyn 1986, Vol/Cyf 8/#2 pp/tt 6–24
- The Welsh Academy Encyclopaedia of Wales, University of Wales Press (2008) p. 864
