= Branwen Gwyn =

British television presenter

Branwen Gwyn is a Welsh television presenter from Cardiff.

== Early life and education ==
Branwen was born in Bangor, Gwynedd and is the daughter of Welsh actor Gwyn Parry. She attended Ysgol Gyfun Gymraeg Glantaf and the University of Wales, Bangor, where she studied music - she is a pianist, trumpeter and singer.

== Career ==
Since graduating in 1999 she has presented various programmes for S4C, including their flagship children's programme Planed Plant and presenter of magazine-style evening programme, Wedi 7.
