= Welsh Proms =

The Welsh Proms Cymru is a week long series of classical music performances which take place at the national concert hall of Wales, St David's Hall, Cardiff in July each year.

The Proms' Artistic Director is Owain Arwel Hughes CBE, who founded the Proms in 1986 and has remained in the post ever since.

The first Welsh Proms season was held in July 1986 and consisted purely of orchestral evening concerts. In recent years the season has been expanded to include additional, smaller scale "fringe" events, including a Family Prom, Tiddly Prom, Organ Prom and Jazz Prom.
