= Owain Arwel Hughes =

Welsh orchestral conductor

Owain Arwel Hughes CBE (born 21 March 1942) is a Welsh orchestral conductor.

Hughes was born in Ton Pentre, Rhondda, the son of the composer Arwel Hughes. He studied at Howardian High School, Cardiff, University College, Cardiff and the Royal College of Music. He studied conducting under Sir Adrian Boult, Bernard Haitink and Rudolf Kempe. According to The Oxford Dictionary of Music, Hughes's professional career began in 1968, since then his guest conductorships have included engagements with Welsh National Opera and the English National Opera, and his musical directorships have included the National Eisteddfod of Wales (1977) and the Huddersfield Choral Society (1980–1986).

== Appointments ==
Hughes's other former and current appointments include:

- Philharmonia Orchestra, London, associate conductor
- Royal Philharmonic Orchestra, London, principal associate conductor
- BBC Welsh Orchestra (now the BBC National Orchestra of Wales), associate conductor (1980–1986)
- Aalborg Symphony Orchestra, Denmark, principal conductor (1994–1999)
- Cape Town Philharmonic Orchestra, South Africa, principal guest conductor
- National Youth Orchestra of Wales, musical director (2003–2010)
- Camerata Wales, founder and musical director (2005–)
- Welsh Proms, founder and artistic director (1986–)
- University of Wales, Trinity Saint David, professor of performance (1986–)

== Publication ==
- Hughes, Owain Arwel (2012). Owain Arwel Hughes: My Life in Music. University of Wales Press. ISBN 9780708325308. Autobiography

== Awards and honours ==
- OBE (2004)
- CBE (2009)
- Honorary DMus, University of Wales (1991)
- Honorary Fellow, Bangor University (2007)
- Honorary Fellow, University of Wales, Lampeter (2007)
