= St David's Hall =

Concert hall in Cardiff, Wales

- Neuadd Dewi Sant (Welsh)

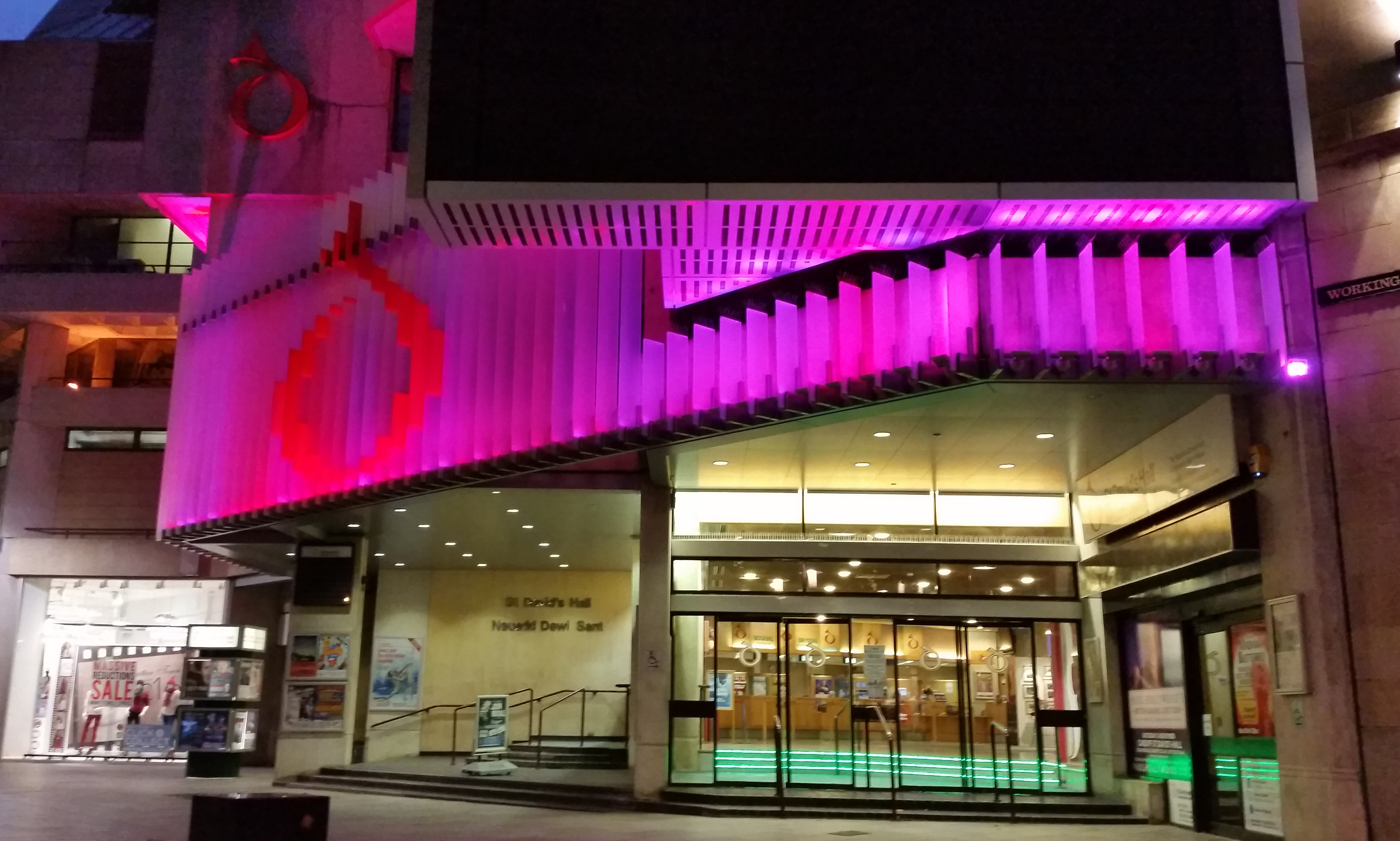
- St David's Hall by night, in 2014, showing the remodelled façade and the base of Cardiff's BBC Big Screen.

General information
- Status: Closed due to the discovery of RAAC
- Type: Concert hall
- Architectural style: Brutalist
- Location: The Hayes, The Hayes, Cardiff, CF10 1AH, Wales
- Coordinates: 51°28′49″N 03°10′36″W
- Construction started: 1977
- Completed: 1982
- Inaugurated: 30 August 1982; 44 years ago
- Closed: 2022
- Cost: £12m
- Owner: Cardiff County Council

Technical details
- Floor count: 7

Design and construction
- Architecture firm: Seymour Harris Partnership
- Structural engineer: Ove Arup and Partners
- Main contractor: John Laing & Son

Other information
- Seating capacity: 1,500
- Number of rooms: 24

Website
- St. David's Hall

Listed Building – Grade II
- Official name: St David's Hall
- Designated: Interim Protection
- Reference no.: 87914

St David's Hall (Welsh: Neuadd Dewi Sant) is a performing arts and conference venue in the heart of Cardiff, Wales. It is the official National Concert Hall and Conference Centre of Wales known for hosting the annual Welsh Proms and the biennial BBC Cardiff Singer of the World competition.

As well as classical music it also plays host to jazz, soul, pop, rock, dance, children's, rhythm and blues, musicals and other forms of world music, as well as light entertainment artists. The foyers in the centre are open and have regular free performances from music groups. The foyers, balconies and bar areas are also used to host art exhibitions.

== Events ==
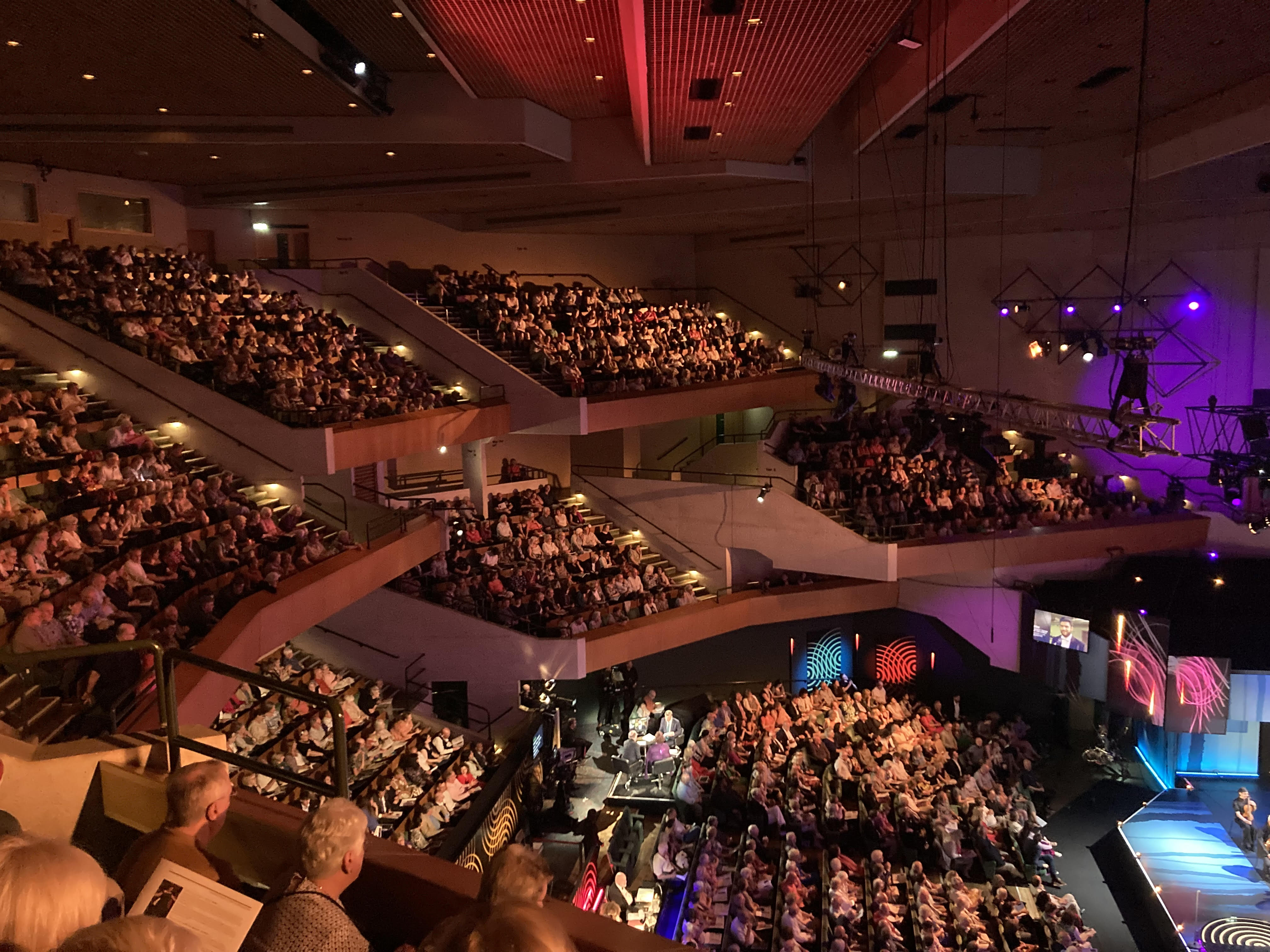
The interior of St David's Hall in 2023

Major events held at the Hall include the BBC Cardiff Singer of the World competition held every two years and the Welsh Proms held annually. Prizes for the Welsh Artist of the Year are awarded at the venue every June, followed by an exhibition of the winners and shortlisted works.

St David's Hall is continually developing its variety of shows. It re-branded the L3 Lounge venue, which has a partly seated capacity of 350 and is mainly used for daytime concerts, the Roots Unearthed folk series and Blas* – A Taste of the Fresh Welsh Sound.

=== BBC NOW ===
BBC National Orchestra and Chorus of Wales (BBC NOW) is the orchestra-in-residence at St David's Hall, performing regularly between September and June each year. Almost all of the orchestra's concerts at St David's Hall are recorded for live or deferred broadcast on BBC Radio 3, and there are dedicated recording facilities within the concert hall to facilitate broadcasts.

== History ==
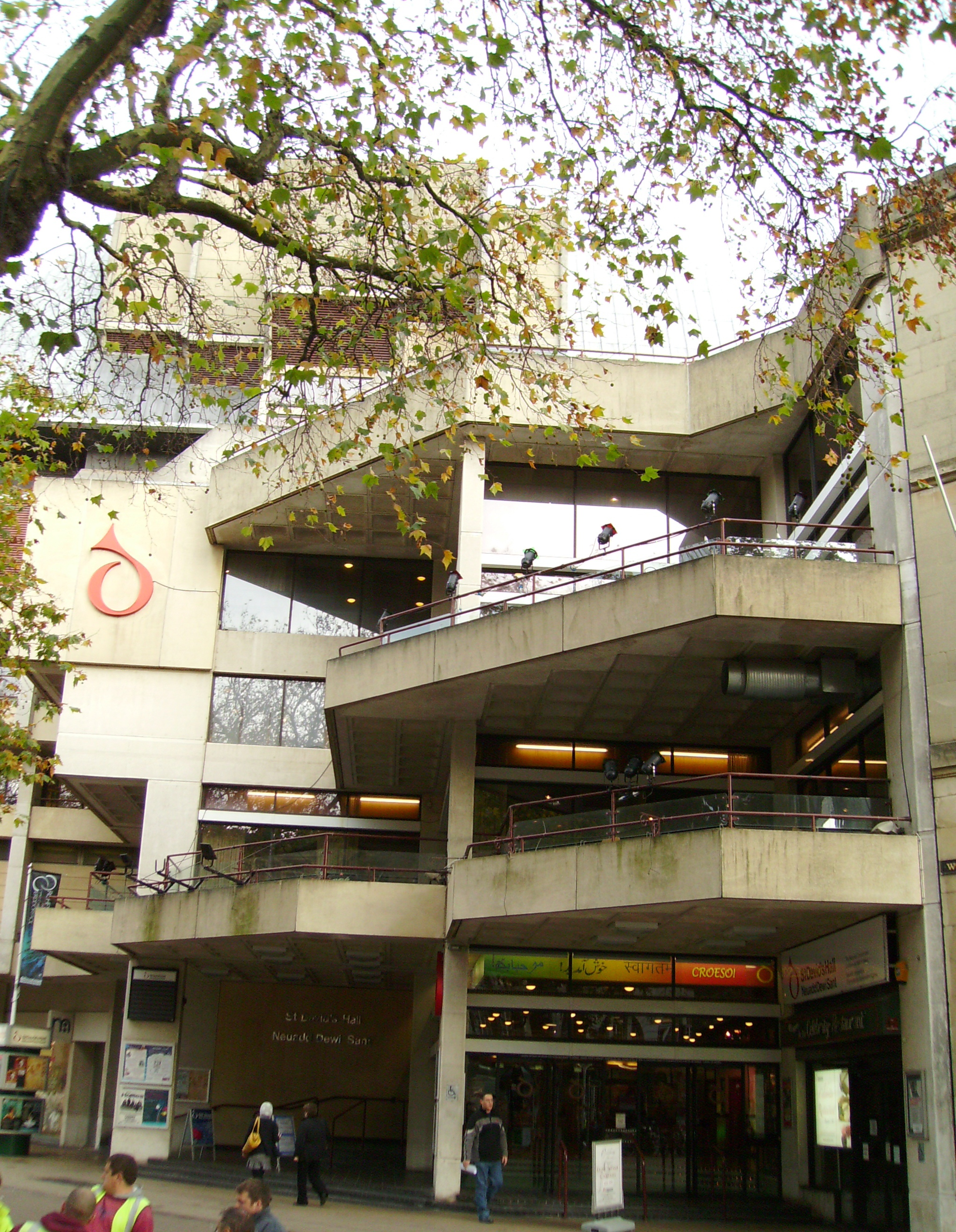
The entrance to St David's Hall in 2007

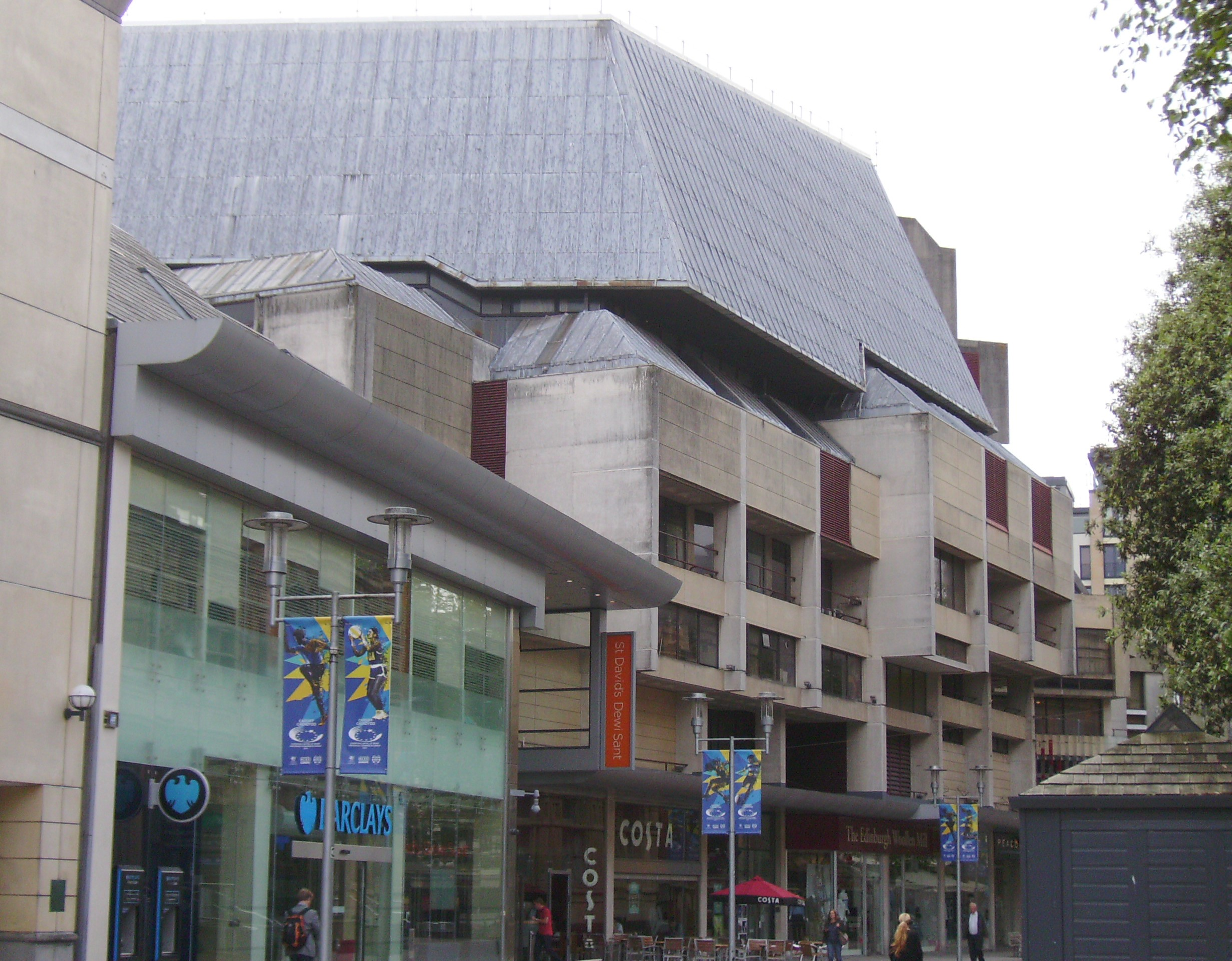
The upper floors with St. David's shopping centre on the ground floor

=== Planning and construction ===
Interior of St David's Hall in the 1980s

Credit is given to the Conservative leader of Cardiff City Council, Ron Watkiss, for bringing St David's Hall to fruition. A bronze bust of him is on display in the foyer of the building.

Architects Seymour Harris Partnership had the task of fitting a major 2,000-seat, acoustically perfect auditorium, with surrounding dressing rooms, bars, foyers, a restaurant, offices and spacious concourse into a cramped city centre space. The space available was so cramped that they had to fit the complex into and on top of an already planned and partly built St. David's Shopping Centre. As a result, they had to use every inch of space available and the building has an unusual shape. The main contractor was John Laing & Son.

It held its first concert on 11 September 1982. It was officially opened over five months after the first concert on 15 February 1983 by the Queen Mother, followed by a concert by the BBC Welsh Symphony Orchestra conducted by Owain Arwel Hughes. Hughes and Watkiss later brought the Welsh Proms to the venue.

The angular grey concrete that makes up nearly the whole visible exterior and some interior foyers looks unmistakably 1970s/1980s modernist new build; the architectural magazine Building Design described the hall's style as "complex late brutalism".

=== Plaques and statues ===
In 1983 to commemorate the Queen Mother officially opening the Hall a plaque was installed in the reception. In 1987 a bronze bust of Diana Princess of Wales was also unveiled to commemorate her visit to Cardiff.

=== Grade II listing ===
The hall has Interim Protection by Cadw as a Grade II listed building under the Planning (Listed Buildings and Conservation Areas) Act 1990 and amended by the Historic Environment (Wales) Act 2016. As a consequence it's an offence to damage the hall or alter it in any way without prior consent.

=== Partnership with AMG ===
In June 2023 it was announced that Academy Music Group (AMG) would take over running of the venue on a 45 year lease. The agreement includes maintenance of the building, which involves significant initial cost for AMG following discovery of reinforced autoclaved aerated concrete (RAAC) in the building's roof.

=== 2023 closure ===
In September 2023 the hall was closed due to the discovery of reinforced autoclaved aerated concrete (RAAC) in its roof. The closure was originally planned to last 18 months to allow for the replacement of the roof. However, following delays, it is expected to reopen in the Summer of 2027. The cost of a replacement roof and wider refurbishment of the hall is estimated to be about £50 million and will be paid for by AMG as part of a conditional 45-year lease. By March 2026, scaffolding had been installed to protect the organ, with work on replacing the roof panels underway and further plans now in place to upgrade the backstage facilities.

== Organ ==
The concert organ of St. David's Hall was completed by Peter Collins in 1982, at a cost of £168,000. This would be the largest organ he ever built. The wooden case was designed by Ralph Downes. Due to problems with the action, J. W. Walker & Sons replaced the action and console, a great embarrassment at the time considering the cost of the organ. The organ has 3 manuals, and German-style continental registrations.

The main auditorium of St. David's Hall is regularly host to organ events, including lunchtime concerts. Recitals on the organ have been performed by performers such as Catherine Ennis, Olivier Latry, Anne Marsden Thomas, Ghislaine Reece-Trapp, and Margaret Phillips. St. David's Hall has also hosted the 2019 Royal College of Organists OrganFest.

== See also ==
- List of Brutalist structures

== Sources ==
- Ritchie, Berry (1997). The Good Builder: The John Laing Story. James & James.
