= 1931 in Wales =

- Centuries: 18th; 19th; 20th; 21st
- Decades: 1910s; 1920s; 1930s; 1940s; 1950s
- See also: List of years in Wales; Timeline of Welsh history 1931 in The United Kingdom Scotland Elsewhere

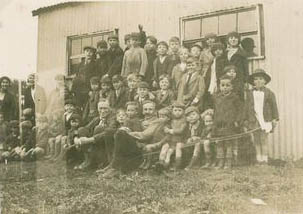
Brynmawr Experiment

This article is about the particular significance of the year 1931 to Wales and its people.

== Incumbents ==
- Archbishop of Wales – Alfred George Edwards, Bishop of St Asaph
- Archdruid of the National Eisteddfod of Wales – Pedrog

== Events ==
- 3 March - Bertrand Russell succeeds to his brother's earldom.
- 14 April - A meteorite falls to earth on farmland in Pontllynfi, near Caernarfon.
- June - Border Breweries (Wrexham) is formed by a merger.
- date unknown
  - The Welsh School of Medicine is founded at Cardiff, later becoming the University of Wales College of Medicine.
  - Nancy Astor addresses a meeting in Cardiff on the subject of recruiting women into the police.

== Arts and literature ==
- Edward Tegla Davies becomes editor of Yr Efrydydd.

=== Awards ===
- National Eisteddfod of Wales (held in Bangor)
- National Eisteddfod of Wales: Chair - David James Jones
- National Eisteddfod of Wales: Crown - Albert Evans Jones

=== New books ===
==== English language ====
- Eliot Crawshay-Williams - Night in the Hotel
- John Morris-Jones - Welsh Syntax: An Unfinished Draft
- Bertrand Russell - The Scientific Outlook
- Lily Tobias – My Mother's House

==== Welsh language ====
- John Jenkins (Gwili) - Hanfod Duw a Pherson Crist
- Moelona - Beryl
- Jennie Thomas – Llyfr Mawr y Plant (first appearance of Wil Cwac Cwac)

=== Music ===
- Grace Williams – Sextet for oboe, trumpet, violin, viola, cello and piano

== Film ==
- Ray Milland appears in The Bachelor Father, Strangers May Kiss, Just a Gigolo, Son of India, Bought, Ambassador Bill, and Blonde Crazy.
- Mary Glynne appears in Inquest

== Broadcasting ==
- The BBC's Daventry radio transmitter increases its Welsh language output from a monthly to a fortnightly "Welsh interest" programme and includes a regular religious service broadcast entirely in Welsh.

== Sport ==
- Rugby union
- Wales, under the captaincy of Jack Bassett, win the Five Nations Championship.
  - 7 February Wales beat Scotland 13–8 at the Cardiff Arms Park, Cardiff.

== Births ==
- 4 January - Harry Griffiths, footballer (died 1978)
- 10 January - Rosalind Howells, Baroness Howells of St Davids, politician
- 2 February - Glynn Edwards, actor (died 2018)
- 4 March - Gwilym Prichard, landscape painter (d. 2015)
- 13 March - Ted Grace, Swansea-born politician in Australia (died 2020)to 1984.
- 20 March - Orig Williams, wrestler and TV presenter (died 2009)
- 22 March - Leslie Thomas, novelist (died 2014)
- 30 March - Emrys Jones, literary scholar (died 2012)
- 7 April - Eifion Evans, church historian (died 2017)
- 11 April - Lewis Jones, rugby player
- 30 April - Merfyn Jones, footballer (died 2016)
- 11 May - Gerry Humphreys, sound engineer (died 2006)
- 29 May – Christopher Evans, computer scientist (died 1979)
- 23 June - Brian Sparks, Wales international rugby union player (died 2013)
- 29 June - Howard Morgan, cricketer
- 2 July - Frank Williams, actor
- 13 July - Philip Jones, businessman and civil servant (died 2000)
- 13 August
  - Roy Evans, trade union leader (died 2015)
  - Gareth Lewis, canon of Newport (died 1997)
- 15 August - Gwyn Evans, bowls player
- 1 September - Mair Wynn Hughes, children's author
- 18 September - Roger Howells, footballer (died 1975)
- 5 November - John Morris, Baron Morris of Aberavon, politician (died 2023)
- 17 November - Dudley Price, footballer (died 2021)
- 27 November - Gareth Griffiths, Wales and British Lions rugby union player
- 29 November - Glyn Hughes, footballer (died 1995)
- 25 December - Dafydd Rowlands, Eisteddfod-winning author (died 2001)
- 27 December - John Charles, footballer (died 2004)
- 30 December - John T. Houghton, climate scientist (died 2020)
- date unknown - Brynley F. Roberts, scholar, librarian, National Library of Wales

== Deaths ==
- 24 January - George Hay Morgan, politician, 64
- 28 January - Robert Henderson, cricketer, 65
- 30 January - Sir Garrod Thomas, physician and politician, 77
- 4 February - David Thomas Jones, administrator, 64
- 22 February - Sir Hugh Vincent, solicitor and Wales international rugby player, 68
- 3 March - Frank Russell, 2nd Earl Russell, 65
- 13 March
  - Vernon Hartshorn MP, miners' leader and politician
  - Edward Thomas John, politician, 73
- 14 April - John Bryn Roberts, lawyer and politician, 88
- 19 April - Evan Richards, Wales international rugby player, 69
- 12 May - Beddoe Rees, industrialist and politician
- 22 June - Sir Henry Reichel, academic, 74
- 28 July - John Neale Dalton, chaplain and tutor to the British royal family, settled in South Wales, 91
- 7 October - William John Griffith, author,
- 26 October - Edward Perkins Alexander, Wales rugby international, 68
- 29 October - Edward Maes Llaned Owen, engineer, surveyor and merchant, a pioneer of Welsh colonisation in Patagonia, 85
- 2 November - Arthur Cook, miners' leader, 47
- 24 November - Jack Jones, footballer, 62
- 27 December - Alfred Perceval Graves, Irish author settled in Wales, 85

== See also ==
- 1931 in Northern Ireland
