= 1934 in Wales =

- Centuries: 18th; 19th; 20th; 21st
- Decades: 1910s; 1920s; 1930s; 1940s; 1950s
- See also: List of years in Wales; Timeline of Welsh history 1934 in The United Kingdom Scotland Elsewhere

This article is about the particular significance of the year 1934 to Wales and its people.

== Incumbents ==
- Archbishop of Wales
  - Alfred George Edwards, Bishop of St Asaph (retired)
  - Charles Green, Bishop of Bangor (elected)
- Archdruid of the National Eisteddfod of Wales – Gwili

== Events ==
- 22 September - At Gresford Colliery in Wrexham, 265 miners are killed in a mining accident. Later in the year, Paul Robeson performs in Caernarfon in a benefit concert for victims of the accident.
- 23 October - Opening of the Guildhall, Swansea, designed by Percy Thomas.
- 24 October - Aneurin Bevan marries fellow MP Jennie Lee.
- date unknown
  - Anthracite production in Wales reaches its peak.
  - The Special Areas Act is passed to help areas such as the South Wales Valleys that have been particularly affected by the Great Depression in the United Kingdom.
  - Courtaulds establishes a new rayon factory at Greenfield.
  - Tudor Thomas's work on corneal grafting restores the sight of a man who had been nearly blind for 27 years.

== Arts and literature ==
- Sir Henry Walford Davies is appointed Master of the King's Musick.
- The Welsh Folk Dance Society is founded at Bala.
- Caradog Prichard becomes sub-editor of the News Chronicle.
- Richard Hughes and his wife move into Laugharne Castle.

=== Awards ===
- National Eisteddfod of Wales (held in Neath)
- National Eisteddfod of Wales: Chair - William Morris, "Ogof Arthur"
- National Eisteddfod of Wales: Crown - Eirug Davies, "Y Gorwel"

=== New books ===
- Edward Tegla Davies - Y Llwybr Arian
- Margiad Evans - Turf or Stone
- D. Gwenallt Jones - Plasau'r Brenin
- Jack Jones - Rhondda Roundabout
- Eiluned Lewis - Dew on the Grass
- Howard Spring - Shabby Tiger
- Dylan Thomas - 18 Poems (his first collection, including "The Force that Through the Green Fuse Drives the Flower")

=== Drama ===
- James Kitchener Davies - Cwm Glo

=== Music ===
- Harry Parr Davies becomes accompanist to Gracie Fields.

=== Film ===
- Ray Milland appears in We're Not Dressing.
- Gareth Hughes appears in Mrs. Wiggs of the Cabbage Patch.
- Yr Ail Fordaith Gymraeg (Second Welsh Cruise), a silent film made by Ifan ab Owen Edwards focusing on the activities of Urdd Gobaith Cymru (with Welsh-language titles)

=== Broadcasting ===
- A new radio station is established at Bangor.

== Sport ==
- Badminton - Wales is a founder member of the Badminton World Federation.
- Cricket - Cyril Walters becomes the first Welshman to captain an England Test team
- Rugby Union
  - 10 March - Wales defeat Ireland 13–0 in a game held at St Helen's, Swansea

== Births ==
- 11 February – Mary Quant, fashion designer
- 25 February (in London) – Nicholas Edwards, Baron Crickhowell, politician (died 2018)
- 28 March – Graham Vearncombe, footballer (died 1993)
- 30 March – Dic Jones, bard and archdruid (died 2009)
- 18 April – Brynmor John, politician (died 1988)
- 16 May – Kenneth O. Morgan, historian and academic
- 10 May – Cliff Wilson, snooker player (died 1994)
- 13 June – Gren (Grenfell Jones), cartoonist (died 2007)
- 5 July – Philip Madoc, actor (died 2012)
- 13 July – Dai Ward, footballer (died 1996)
- 6 August – Billy Boston, rugby league footballer (died 2026)
- 16 August – Dave Thomas, golfer and architect (died 2013)
- 4 September – Clive Granger, econometrician (died 2009)
- 19 August – Ron Jones, athlete (died 2021)
- 20 September – David Marquand, academic and MP
- 1 November – William Mathias, composer (died 1992)
- 6 November – Betty Campbell, née Johnson, Wales's first black head teacher (died 2017)
- 24 November – Dewi Zephaniah Phillips, philosopher (died 2006)
- date unknown – Mary Lloyd Jones, painter and printmaker

== Deaths ==
- 6 January – Dorothy Edwards, novelist, 30 (suicide)
- 8 January – Ivor Bowen, judge, 71
- 23 January – Charles McLaren, 1st Baron Aberconway, owner of Bodnant, 83
- 2 February – Edward Bevan, Bishop of Swansea and Brecon, 72
- 4 February – Harry Wetter, Welsh international rugby union player, 52
- 25 February – Daniel Protheroe, composer and conductor, 67
- 28 February – David Davies, textile merchant, 81
- 3 May – Courtenay Morgan, 1st Viscount Tredegar, 68
- 24 May – William Nathaniel Jones, politician, 76
- 14 June – George Thomas, Wales international rugby union player, 76/77
- 30 June – Hugh Evans, author and publisher, 79
- 19 July – Christopher Williams, painter, 61
- 28 August – Edgeworth David, geologist and explorer, 76
- 11 October – John Kelt Edwards, cartoonist, 59
- 13 November – Sir Vincent Evans, journalist, 81
- 4 December – Henry Davies, cricketer, 69

== See also ==
- 1934 in Northern Ireland
