= 1938 in Wales =

- Centuries: 18th; 19th; 20th; 21st
- Decades: 1910s; 1920s; 1930s; 1940s; 1950s
- See also: List of years in Wales; Timeline of Welsh history 1938 in The United Kingdom Scotland Elsewhere

This article is about the particular significance of the year 1938 to Wales and its people.

== Incumbents ==
- Archbishop of Wales – Charles Green, Bishop of Bangor
- Archdruid of the National Eisteddfod of Wales – J.J.

== Events ==
- 14–19 January – A storm causes extensive damage in Aberystwyth; the promenade and pier are largely destroyed by 90 mph winds.
- 8 May – William Ormsby-Gore succeeds his father as Baron Harlech.
- October – The first scheduled night flight in the UK begins operating between Cardiff and Weston-super-Mare.
- 23 November – Opening of the Temple of Peace and Health in Cathays Park, Cardiff.
- Mining comes to an end at Dolaucothi Gold Mines.
- The excavation of Llantwit Major Roman Villa by V. E. Nash-Williams, begins (continues to 1948).
- Opening of RNAD Trecwm.

== Arts and literature ==
- April – Augustus John resigns from the Royal Academy.
- September – Ivor Novello appears in Henry V at Drury Lane Theatre, produced by Lewis Casson.

=== Awards ===
- National Eisteddfod of Wales (held in Cardiff)
- National Eisteddfod of Wales: Chair – Gwilym R. Jones
- National Eisteddfod of Wales: Crown – Edgar H. Thomas
- National Eisteddfod of Wales: Prose Medal – Elena Puw Morgan

=== New books ===
==== In English ====
- Idris Davies – Gwalia Deserta
- Ness Edwards – History of the South Wales Miners Federation
- Richard Hughes – In Hazard
- Jack Jones – Bidden to the Feast
- Edith Picton-Turbervill – Myself When Young
- William Plomer (ed.) – Kilvert's Diary, 1870-1879

==== In Welsh ====
- Richard Bennett – Methodistiaeth Caersws
- Tom Beynon – Gwrid ar Orwel ym Morgannwg
- Edward Tegla Davies – Stori Sam
- Edward Morgan Humphreys – Dirgelwch Gallt Y Ffrwd
- Ifor Williams (ed.) – Canu Aneirin

=== New drama ===
- James Kitchener Davies – Susannah
- Charles Langbridge Morgan – The Flashing Stream
- Emlyn Williams – The Corn is Green

=== Music ===
- Tudor Davies plays the lead in the first English-language production of Verdi's Don Carlos, at Sadler's Wells.

== Film ==
- Naunton Wayne appears as Caldicott in The Lady Vanishes.

== Broadcasting ==
- 1 March – BBC Radio broadcasts the world première of Arwel Hughes's latest composition, Tydi a Roddaist.

== Sport ==
- Empire Games
  - Wales win three medals at the 1938 Empire Games, Denis Reardon, (middleweight boxing), Jim Alford (1 mile run) and Jeanne Greenland (110 yard backstroke).
- Rugby union
  - 5 February – Scotland beat Wales 8–6 at Murrayfield, Edinburgh

== Births ==
- 6 January – William Edwards, politician (d. 2007)
- 1 February – Cynog Dafis, politician
- 22 January – Brook Williams, actor (d. 2005)
- 2 March – Deddie Davies, actress (d. 2016)
- 20 April – Andrew Vicari, portrait painter (d. 2016)
- 25 April – John Davies, historian (d. 2015)
- 14 May – Clive Rowlands, rugby player and coach (d. 2023)
- 25 May – Trevor Peck, footballer (d. 2014)
- 31 May – John Prescott, Deputy Prime Minister of the UK (d. 2024)
- 13 June – Gwynne Howell, bass
- 6 July – Tony Lewis, cricketer and commentator
- 23 July – Meic Stephens, literary editor (d. 2018)
- 6 August – Rees Davies, historian (d. 2005)
- 12 September
  - Richard Booth, secondhand bookseller (d. 2019)
  - Patrick Mower, Welsh-descended actor
- 9 October – Denzil Davies, politician (d. 2018)
- 22 October – Dai Davies , English-born Welsh sports journalist (d. 2008)
- 1 November – Delwyn Williams, politician
- 4 December – Richard Meade, equestrian (d. 2015)
- 15 December – Michael Bogdanov, theatre director (d. 2017 in Greece)

== Deaths ==
- 3 February – James Bevan, First Wales rugby union captain, 81
- 9 February – Dick Hellings, Wales international rugby player, 63
- 30 March – Jack Elliott, Wales international rugby player, 66
- 16 April – Sir William Price, industrialist
- 8 May – George Ormsby-Gore, 3rd Baron Harlech, 83
- 28 May – Alfred Brice, Wales international rugby player, 66
- 23 June – Clement Edwards, politician, 69
- 22 July – Giotto Griffiths, Wales international rugby player, 73
- 22 October (in Dublin) – Sir John Purser Griffith, civil engineer, 90
- 4 November – John Thomas Job, minister, hymn-writer and poet, 71
- 28 November – Reginald Arthur (Reggie) Gibbs, shipowner and rugby footballer, 56
- 29 December (at sea) – Eluned Morgan, writer, 68
- date unknown – Gwynfil Evans (Barry Western), novelist

== See also ==
- 1938 in Northern Ireland
