= 1935 in Wales =

- Centuries: 18th; 19th; 20th; 21st
- Decades: 1910s; 1920s; 1930s; 1940s; 1950s
- See also: List of years in Wales; Timeline of Welsh history 1935 in The United Kingdom Scotland Elsewhere

This article is about the particular significance of the year 1935 to Wales and its people.

== Incumbents ==
- Archbishop of Wales – Charles Green, Bishop of Bangor
- Archdruid of the National Eisteddfod of Wales – Gwili

== Events ==
- 6 April – Industrialist MP Henry Haydn Jones becomes the owner of Aberllefenni Quarry.
- 23 April – Morriston Orpheus Choir is founded by Ivor E. Sims.
- 17 June – The first detection of an aircraft by ground-based radar is achieved by a team including Edward George Bowen.
- October – At Nine Mile Point Colliery in Cwmfelinfach 164 miners take part in a "stay-down" strike action lasting 177 hours over the use of non-union labour.
- 14 November – In the UK general election:
  - Megan Lloyd George reverts from Independent Liberal to Liberal MP after a four-year estrangement from the party leadership.
  - Newly elected MPs include Arthur Jenkins at Pontypool.
- 3 December – Felinfoel Brewery in Llanelli becomes the first in the UK to sell beer in cans.
- date unknown
  - Ten people are jailed at Blaina and a further 32 at Merthyr Tydfil during a period of industrial unrest in South Wales.
  - Penallta Colliery takes the European record for amount of coal wound in a 24-hour period.

== Arts and literature ==
- Arwel Hughes joins the BBC's music department in Cardiff.

=== Awards ===
- National Eisteddfod of Wales (held in Caernarfon)
- National Eisteddfod of Wales: Chair – E. Gwyndaf Evans
- National Eisteddfod of Wales: Crown – Gwilym R. Jones

=== New books ===
==== English language ====
- Rhys Davies – Honey and Bread
- Walford Davies – The Pursuit of Music
- Geraint Goodwin – Call Back Yesterday
- Llewelyn Wyn Griffith – Spring of Youth
- Jack Jones – Black Parade
- Eiluned Lewis – December Apples (poems)
- Bertrand Russell – Religion and Science
- Howard Spring – Rachel Rosing

==== Welsh language ====
- Thomas Parry (ed) – Baledi'r Ddeunawfed Ganrif
- Ifor Williams (editor) – Canu Llywarch Hen

== New drama ==
- James Kitchener Davies – Cwm Glo
- Emlyn Williams – Night Must Fall
- Stephen J. Williams – Y dyn hysbys: comedi mewn tair act

=== Music ===
- John Glyn Davies – Cerddi Robin Goch
- Ivor Novello – Glamorous Night

== Film ==
- Y Chwarelwr, the first Welsh language film
- Pink Shirts, an amateur film made by the Marquess of Anglesey and his family and written by Peter Fleming, satirizing the British Fascist movement.

== Broadcasting ==
- April – John Reith, head of the BBC, meets a deputation from the University of Wales and Welsh MPs, and agrees to Wales becoming a BBC region.
- November – The BBC opens a studio in Bangor.
- date unknown – The BBC Welsh Orchestra, originally founded in 1928, is re-established as a 20-piece ensemble.

== Sport ==
- Rugby
  - 28 September – Swansea is the first British club to defeat a touring New Zealand side and becomes the first team, club or international, to beat all three major touring Southern Hemisphere countries.

== Births ==
- 13 January – Vincent Kane, broadcaster
- 4 February – Brian Davies, animal welfare activist (died 2022)
- 7 February – Cliff Jones, footballer
- 9 February – Paul Flynn, politician (died 2019)
- 27 March – Tom Parry Jones, inventor (died 2013)
- 29 March – Delme Bryn-Jones, operatic baritone (died 2001)
- 8 April – Islwyn Jones, footballer
- 2 May – Richard Livsey, Baron Livsey of Talgarth, politician (died 2010)
- 25 May – John Ffowcs Williams, engineer
- 27 May – Mal Evans, Beatles' roadie, born in Liverpool (shot by police 1976 in the United States)
- 30 May – Brayley Reynolds, footballer
- 24 June – Garfield Davies, trade unionist and politician (died 2019)
- 26 July – George Evans, footballer (died 2000)
- 1 August – Brian Jenkins, footballer
- 5 August – Kingsley Jones, rugby player (died 2003)
- 5 October – Colin Hudson, footballer (died 2005)
- 23 October – Roger Roberts, Baron Roberts of Llandudno, politician
- November – Ivor Davies, painter and installation artist
- 30 November – Sally Roberts Jones, poet and publisher
- 21 December – Geoff Lewis, jockey
- 31 December – Edwin Regan, Roman Catholic bishop

== Deaths ==
- 1 February – John Aeron Thomas, industrialist and politician, 84
- 15 February – Tom Reason, cricketer, 44
- March – William Frost, inventor, 86
- 3 March – Caradog Roberts, composer, 46
- 13 March – Francis Vaughan, Roman Catholic bishop, 57 (post-operative complications)
- 14 March – Thomas Lloyd, Anglican Bishop of Maenan, 77
- 20 March – Ernest Edwin Williams, journalist, author and barrister, 68
- 23 March – John Gwynoro Davies, minister and author, 80
- 24 March – Maurice Parry, footballer, 57
- 9 May – John Goulstone Lewis, Wales international rugby union player, 75
- 18 May – T. E. Lawrence, "Lawrence of Arabia", 46 (motorcycle accident)
- 1 July – Bill Evans, rugby player, 78
- 19 July – Tom Jones, cricketer, 34
- 12 August – Gareth Richard Vaughan Jones, journalist and secretary to Lloyd George, 29 (murdered in Manchukuo)
- 21 August – Matthew Vaughan-Davies, 1st Baron Ystwyth, politician, 94
- 20 September – Teddy Peers, footballer, 48
- 10 October – Samuel Evans, educationist
- 31 October – Noah Ablett, politician, 52 (alcohol-related)
- 27 November – Robert Mills-Roberts, footballer, 73
- 7 December – Griffith Evans, bacteriologist, 100
- 13 December – Amy Dillwyn, businesswoman and novelist, 90

== See also ==
- 1935 in Northern Ireland
