= 1932 in Wales =

- Centuries: 18th; 19th; 20th; 21st
- Decades: 1910s; 1920s; 1930s; 1940s; 1950s
- See also: List of years in Wales; Timeline of Welsh history 1932 in The United Kingdom Scotland Elsewhere

This article is about the particular significance of the year 1932 to Wales and its people.

== Incumbents ==
- Archbishop of Wales – Alfred George Edwards, Bishop of St Asaph
- Archdruid of the National Eisteddfod of Wales
  - Pedrog (outgoing)
  - Gwili (incoming)

== Events ==
- 25 January – Leif Jones is created Baron Rhayader.
- 1 March (Saint David's Day) – Members of Plaid Cymru on two occasions replace the Union Jack flying over Caernarfon Castle with a flag displaying the red Welsh Dragon.
- c. August – The Grand Pavilion, Porthcawl, is completed.
- Plaid Cymru adopts self-government as its official policy.
- Hilary Marquand’s economic surveys of South Wales highlight the depressed conditions in the area during the Great Depression in the United Kingdom.

== Arts and literature ==
- Frank Brangwyn completes the Empire Panels.
- Welsh-language newspaper Y Cymro is launched.

=== Awards ===
- National Eisteddfod of Wales (held in Port Talbot)
- National Eisteddfod of Wales: Chair – D. J. Davies, "Mam"
- National Eisteddfod of Wales: Crown – Thomas Eurig Davies, "A Ddioddefw a Orfu"

=== New books ===
==== English language ====
- Margiad Evans – Country Dance
- Elisabeth Inglis-Jones – Crumbling Pageant
- Howard Spring – Darkie and Co.
- Hilda Vaughan – The Soldier and the Gentlewoman
- Francis Brett Young – The House Under the Water

==== Welsh language ====
- Richard Ithamar Aaron – Hanes Athroniaeth
- T. H. Parry-Williams – Canu Rhydd Cynnar
- David Walters (Eurof) – Pwerau'r Deufyd

=== Music ===
- W. Bradwen – Mab yr ystorm
- Grace Williams
  - Suite for orchestra
  - Two Psalms for contralto, harp and strings

== Film ==
- 13 June – Port Talbot-born English actress Peg Entwistle signs a contract with RKO in the United States.
- 16 September – Peg Entwistle commits suicide by jumping from the letter "H" of the giant Hollywoodland sign.
- 20 October – Release of comedy horror The Old Dark House, set entirely in Wales but filmed wholly in Hollywood.
- Edmund Gwenn appears in Tell Me Tonight, Money for Nothing, Condemned to Death, Love on Wheels, Lord Babs and Frail Women.

== Broadcasting ==
The broadcasting committee of the Welsh Parliamentary Labour Party obtains agreement from the BBC to broadcast a fortnightly programme and religious content in the Welsh language.

== Sport ==
- Boxing
  - 3 February – Jack Petersen beats Dick Power to take the Welsh heavyweight title.
  - 23 May – Jack Petersen wins the British light-heavyweight title against Harry Crossley.
  - 12 July – Jack Petersen wins the British heavyweight title against Reggie Meen.

== Births ==
- 12 March – John Harris, dean of Brecon (died 2019)
- 20 March – Garfield Owen, Wales dual-code rugby international
- 6 April – Leon Eagles, actor (died 1997)
- 28 May – John Savage, prime minister of Nova Scotia (died 2003)
- 30 May – Ivor Richard, Baron Richard, politician (died 2018)
- 31 May – Glyn Davies, footballer (died 2013)
- 22 June – Mary Wynne Warner, mathematician (died 1998)
- 30 June – Derek Tapscott, footballer (died 2008)
- 10 July – Maureen Guy, mezzo-soprano (died 2015)
- 27 July – Dennis Callan, footballer (died 2006)
- 2 August – Kenneth Bowen, concert tenor (died 2018)
- 12 August – Gwilym Jenkins, statistician and systems engineer (died 1982)
- 31 August – Colin Gale, footballer (died 2008)
- 9 September – Alice Thomas Ellis, born Ann Margaret Lindholm in Liverpool, novelist (died 2005)
- 8 October – Ray Reardon, snooker player (died 2024)
- 18 October – Don Devereux, dual-code rugby player (died 1995)
- 24 October – Allan Rogers, politician
- 16 November – Onllwyn Brace, Wales rugby union captain (died 2013)
- 21 November – Alvan Williams, footballer (died 2003)
- 1 December – Cissy Davies, Olympic gymnast
- 7 December – Elystan Morgan, politician
- 15 December – John Meurig Thomas, chemist (died 2020)
- date unknown – Richard Cyril Hughes, historian

== Deaths ==
- 27 February – Dicky Owen, Wales rugby union international, 55 (suicide)
- 3 March – Ernest Howard Griffiths, physicist, 80
- 10 April – Gwyn Thomas, cricketer, 41
- 14 May – John Hughes, composer of Cwm Rhondda, 58
- 8 June – Margaret Nevinson, suffrage campaigner, 74
- 28 June – Thomas Phillips Price, landowner, industrialist and politician, 88
- 9 July – John Owen Williams (Pedrog), minister and poet
- 10 July – Martha Hughes Cannon, Welsh-born US physician, politician and campaigner, 75
- 20 July – Bill Beynon, British bantamweight boxing champion, 41 (killed in mining accident)
- 23 July – Tenby Davies, half-mile world champion runner, 48
- 30 August – Conway Rees, Wales rugby union international, 62
- 11 September – Aneurin Rees Wales rugby union international, 74
- 16 September – Peg Entwistle, actress, 24 (suicide)
- 26 October – William Howell Davies, merchant and politician, 80
- 25 November
  - John Williams, recipient of the Victoria Cross, 75
  - Hugh Hughes, trade union leader, 54

== See also ==
- 1932 in Northern Ireland
