= 1936 in Wales =

- Centuries: 18th; 19th; 20th; 21st
- Decades: 1910s; 1920s; 1930s; 1940s; 1950s
- See also: List of years in Wales; Timeline of Welsh history 1936 in The United Kingdom Scotland Elsewhere

This article is about the particular significance of the year 1936 to Wales and its people.

== Incumbents ==
- Archbishop of Wales – Charles Green, Bishop of Bangor
- Archdruid of the National Eisteddfod of Wales
  - Gwili (outgoing)
  - J.J. (incoming)

== Events ==
- 20 January - Edward, Prince of Wales, accedes to the throne as Edward VIII, King of the United Kingdom, following the death of his father King George V of the United Kingdom.
- March - Jim Griffiths, later the first Secretary of State for Wales, is elected member for Llanelli following the death in office of the sitting MP.
- May - Colonial Secretary Jimmy Thomas is forced to resign from politics after a scandal involving Stock Exchange dealings.
- 8 September - In an incident known as Llosgi'r ysgol fomio (The burning of the bombing school), or, Tân yn Llŷn (Fire in Llŷn), a sabotage attack on Penyberth aerodrome is carried out by Lewis Valentine, D. J. Williams and Saunders Lewis.
- 19 November - Dowlais Ironworks ceases steel production at its original Dowlais works. On a visit to the depressed areas of the South Wales Valleys King Edward VIII comments that "These works brought all these people here. Something should be done to get them at work again." The remark is much misquoted.
- October - Saunders Lewis courts further controversy by appearing to praise Adolf Hitler.
- unknown dates
  - Six men and one woman are jailed after an anti-Fascist demonstration at Tonypandy.
  - Of 118 men from the South Wales coalfield who enlist in the International Brigade, 34 are killed.
  - Treforest Trading Estate opens.

== Arts and literature ==
=== Awards ===
- National Eisteddfod of Wales (held in Fishguard)
- National Eisteddfod of Wales: Chair - Simon B. Jones
- National Eisteddfod of Wales: Crown - David Jones

=== New books ===
==== English language ====
- Rex Barker - Christ In The Valley of Unemployment
- Margiad Evans - Creed
- Geraint Goodwin - The Heyday in the Blood
- W. F. Grimes - The Megalithic Monuments of Wales
- Bertrand Russell - Which Way to Peace?
- Dylan Thomas - Twenty-five Poems, including "And death shall have no dominion"
- Ethel Lina White - The Wheel Spins (The Lady Vanishes)

==== Welsh language ====
- Ambrose Bebb - Crwydro'r Cyfandir
- I. D. Hooson - Cerddi a Baledi
- Kate Roberts (author) - Traed mewn cyffion

=== New drama ===
- Saunders Lewis - Buchedd Garmon

=== Music ===
- John Glyn Davies - Cerddi Portinllaen
- Arwel Hughes - Fantasia for strings
- Ivor Novello - Careless Rapture

== Film ==
- Visit of David Lloyd George to Germany (shot by David Lloyd George's private secretary)

== Sport ==
- Rugby Union
  - 14 March - Wales beats Ireland 3–0 at Cardiff Arms Park

== Births ==
- 9 January - Mike Davies, tennis player and sports administrator (died 2015 in the United States)
- 7 February - Keith Rowlands, rugby union player and administrator (died 2006)
- 14 March - John Meirion Morris, sculptor (died 2020)
- 16 March - Vic Rouse, footballer
- 10 April - Ricky Valance, born David Spencer, pop singer (died 2020)
- 12 May - Phil Edwards, boxer
- 23 May - Jennifer Daniel, actress
- 27 June - Clive Thomas, football referee
- 6 July - Redvers Sangoe, light-heavyweight boxer (died 1964)
- 30 July - Haydn Morgan, Welsh international rugby union player
- 2 September - Gwyn Thomas, poet and academic (died 2016)
- 20 September - Andrew Davies, screenwriter
- 25 September - Michael Davies, Catholic writer (died 2004)
- 15 October - Timothy Stamps, Minister of Health in Zimbabwe (died 2017 in Zimbabwe)
- 7 November - Dame Gwyneth Jones, opera singer
- 18 November - Brian Huggett, golfer (died 2024)

== Deaths ==
- 9 January
  - David Phillips Jones, Wales international rugby player, 54
  - "Buller" Williams, Wales international rugby player
- 20 January - George V (Prince of Wales, 1901–1910), 70
- 7 February - John Henry Williams, sitting MP for Llanelli, 66 (pneumonia)
- 23 February - Harry Jones, Welsh-born prospector and politician in British Columbia, 95
- 20 March - William Napier Bruce, lawyer, 78
- 5 May - Percy Bennett, Wales international rugby player, 66
- 16 May - John Jenkins (Gwili), poet and archdruid, 63
- 13 June - William Elsey, Wales international rugby player, 65
- 3 August - John Alf Brown, Wales international rugby player, 54
- 2 September - William Rees, priest and writer, 77
- 28 October - George Barker, politician, 78
- 29 October - Dan Griffiths, Wales international rugby player, 79
- 11 November - Sir Edward German, English composer of Welsh descent, 71
- 15 December - Reese J. Llewellyn, Welsh-American businessman, 64

== See also ==
- 1936 in Northern Ireland
