= 1939 in Wales =

- Centuries: 18th; 19th; 20th; 21st
- Decades: 1910s; 1920s; 1930s; 1940s; 1950s
- See also: List of years in Wales; Timeline of Welsh history 1939 in The United Kingdom Scotland Elsewhere

This article is about the particular significance of the year 1939 to Wales and its people.

== Incumbents ==
- Archbishop of Wales – Charles Green, Bishop of Bangor
- Archdruid of the National Eisteddfod of Wales
  - J.J. (outgoing)
  - Crwys (incoming)

== Events ==
- March–November - Aneurin Bevan is temporarily expelled from the Labour Party.
- 27 April - Ely Racecourse in Cardiff closes.
- 1 June - The submarine HMS Thetis sinks during trials in Red Wharf Bay, Anglesey. At least 98 men are lost.
- Late August - Most paintings evacuated from the National Gallery in London, many going to Penrhyn Castle at Bangor and the National Library of Wales in Aberystwyth; the latter also houses manuscripts, prints and books from the British Museum.
- 3 September - World War II: Declaration of war by the United Kingdom on Nazi Germany following the German invasion of Poland on 1 September.
- September - The Urdd opens Ysgol Gymraeg yr Urdd, the first-ever Welsh-medium primary school, at Aberystwyth. In its first year the school consists of just seven pupils and one teacher, Norah Isaac.
- October - Construction at M. S. Factory, Valley in Flintshire of tunnels for storage of chemical weapons begins.
- The first war-time civilian evacuees arrive in Wales.
- Vickers-Armstrong opens an aircraft factory at Broughton, Flintshire, later taken over by De Havilland.
- A government report shows that seven of the thirteen Welsh counties have the highest incidence of tuberculosis in the whole of England and Wales.
- George Maitland Lloyd Davies becomes President of the pacifist group Heddychwyr Cymru.
- Talybont Reservoir in the Brecon Beacons is completed to supply Newport.
- Sea Roads is constructed in Penarth in the Modernist style.

== Arts and literature ==
- August - For the first time ever, both chair and crown are withheld at the National Eisteddfod.
- 4 October - Poets Lynette Roberts and Keidrych Rhys marry.
- John Roberts Williams becomes editor of Y Cymro.

=== Awards ===
- National Eisteddfod of Wales (held in Denbigh)
- National Eisteddfod of Wales: Chair - withheld
- National Eisteddfod of Wales: Crown - withheld
- National Eisteddfod of Wales: Prose Medal - John Gwilym Jones

=== New books ===
==== English language ====
- B. L. Coombes - These Poor Hands
- Richard Llewellyn - How Green Was My Valley
- Howard Spring - Heaven Lies About Us

==== Welsh language ====
- D. Gwenallt Jones - Ysgubau'r Awen
- David James Jones - Hanes Athroniaeth: Y Cyfnod Groegaidd
- Moelona - Ffynnonlloyw
- Caradog Prichard - Terfysgoedd Daear

=== Music ===
- William Ifor Jones makes his debut as conductor of the Bach Choir of Bethlehem.
- Ivor Novello - The Dancing Years
- Grace Williams - Four Illustrations for the Legend of Rhiannon

== Film ==
- Ray Milland stars in Hotel Imperial and Beau Geste.
- Sheep Dog, featuring the shepherd Tom Jones of Treorchy

=== Welsh language film ===
- Efaciwis a Ricriwtio (World War II propaganda film)

== Broadcasting ==
- At the outbreak of war, the BBC was to transmit a unified service, including programs in the Welsh language. One of the few Welsh-language broadcasts to survive is a daily bulletin of world news at 5 pm. It was broadcast before the daily news in English at 6pm.
- The BBC radio comedy series It's That Man Again begins its ten-year run. From 1940 to 1943 it will be broadcast from the BBC Wales studios in Bangor, Caernarvonshire, north Wales, where the BBC's Light Entertainment Department is temporarily based.

== Sports ==
- Rugby union
  - 4 February – Leslie Manfield (one of only four players to represent Wales both before and after World War II) gains his first senior cap in the match between Wales and Scotland.

== Births ==
- 11 January - Phil Williams, politician (died 2003)
- 16 February - David Griffiths, portrait painter
- 2 March - * Norman Rees, television journalist (died 2023)
- 8 March - Robert Tear, operatic tenor (died 2011)
- 16 March - Kenny Morgans, footballer (died 2012)
- 29 March - Ronnie Williams, actor and comedian (died 1997)
- 7 April - Keith Bradshaw, Wales international rugby player (died 2014)
- 27 May - Cliff Williams, rugby union player (died 2014)
- 8 June - Norman Davies, historian
- 17 June - Donald Anderson, Baron Anderson of Swansea, politician
- 17 July - Spencer Davis, born Spencer Davies, beat musician, multi-instrumentalist (died 2020 in the United States)
- 21 July - Frank Rankmore, footballer
- 24 September - Steve Gammon, footballer
- 29 September
  - Rhodri Morgan, First Minister of Wales (died 2017)
  - Lynne Thomas, cricketer
- 10 October - Neil Sloane, mathematician
- 8 November - Meg Wynn Owen, actress (died 2022)

== Deaths ==
- 27 January - Lewis Jones, miners' leader and novelist, 41
- 17 March - Owen Badger, Wales international rugby player, 67
- 24 March - Gwyn Nicholls, rugby player, 64
- 23 April - Morgan Jones, sitting MP for Llanelli, 52
- 29 April - Timothy Rees, Bishop of Llandaff, 64
- 14 June - Ivor Guest, 1st Viscount Wimborne, politician, 66
- 29 June - Sir Henry Stuart Jones, academic, 72
- 9 July - Charles Nicholl, Wales international rugby union player, 69
- 18 September - Gwen John, artist, 63
- 21 September - Sir John Lynn-Thomas, surgeon, 78
- 26 September - Leif Jones, politician, 77
- 7 November - Gwenllian Morgan, local politician, 87
- 2 December - Llewelyn Powys, writer, 55

== See also ==
- 1939 in Northern Ireland
