= Yr Herald Cymraeg =

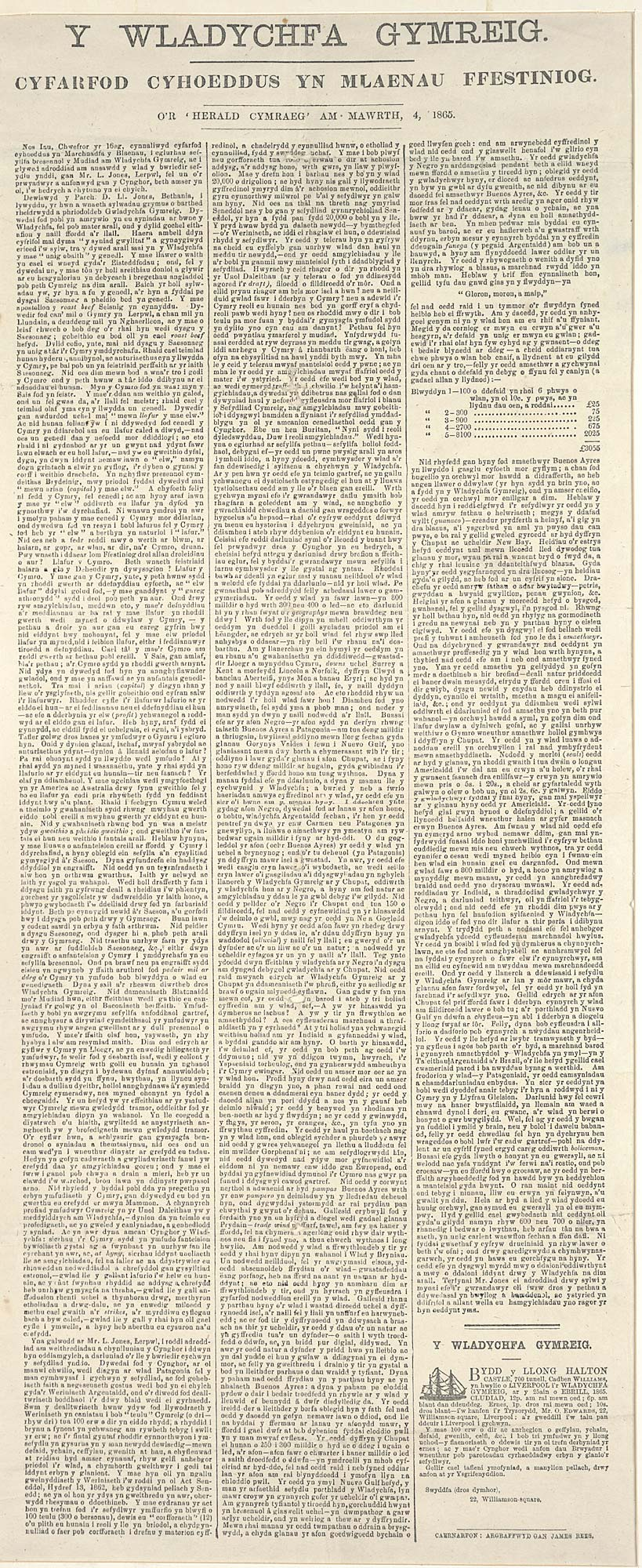
Report of a public meeting at Blaenau Ffestiniog regarding Y Wladfa, from Yr Herald Cymraeg, 4 March 1865

Yr Herald Cymraeg (English: The Welsh Herald) (also Yr Herald Gymraeg or Yr Herald) is a weekly Welsh-language newspaper. The paper was established in Caernarfon in 1855 by James Rees and is one of Wales' oldest newspapers. In 1937 the paper was merged with Y Genedl Gymreig under the name Yr Herald Cymraeg a'r Genedl.

Daniel Rees was editor in the first part of the 20th century. Robert John Rowlands (Meuryn) was subsequently editor from 1921 to 1954. There have been a number of famous writers working for Yr Herald Cymraeg, among them T. Gwynn Jones, Edward Prosser Rhys, Caradog Prichard, Gwilym R. Jones a John Roberts Williams.

The editor of the paper between 1994 and April 2018 was Tudur Huws Jones.

== Establishment and alignment ==
The paper had a large circulation in the counties of Anglesey and Caernarfonshire. It was established with a Liberal alignment and featured columns by the renowned writers Llew Llwyfo, Richard Hughes Williams and T. Gwynn Jones.

== 21st century ==
Since 2004, Yr Herald Cymraeg has appeared as a supplement in the Daily Post each Wednesday. The contributors include Rhys Mwyn, Angharad Tomos and Bethan Gwanas.

In January 2022, columnists of the paper called for protests against the "sharp decline" of the paper, fearing that the newspaper was in danger of disappearing altogether. Readers were asked to send the company that owns the newspaper messages protesting against the reduction in content. As of 2022, the paper consisted of just one column per issue. The then Archdruid, Myrddin ap Dafydd, expressed support for the continuation of the Welsh-language newspaper. Suggesting that a daily page of Welsh news could be included, with vocabulary for learners.

During the COVID-19 pandemic, contributors wrote articles for free to ensure the continuation of the paper.
