= 1937 in Wales =

- Centuries: 18th; 19th; 20th; 21st
- Decades: 1910s; 1920s; 1930s; 1940s; 1950s
- See also: List of years in Wales; Timeline of Welsh history 1937 in The United Kingdom Scotland Elsewhere

This article is about the particular significance of the year 1937 to Wales and its people.

== Incumbents ==
- Archbishop of Wales – Charles Green, Bishop of Bangor
- Archdruid of the National Eisteddfod of Wales – J.J.

== Events ==
- 3 February – 300,000 people march in South Wales in protest against the Means test.
- May – Tywyn businessman and MP Henry Haydn Jones, is knighted.
- 29 June – The Swansea Improvements and Tramway Company closes its tramway system.
- 30 June – The Aid to Spain movement welcomes the arrival at Swansea railway station of the first Basque refugee children to come to Wales.
- 15 July – George VI and Queen Elizabeth visit Aberystwyth to open the new building at the National Library of Wales.
- 27 August – Saunders Lewis, Lewis Valentine and D. J. Williams are released from Wormwood Scrubs to the plaudits of nationalist supporters, having served a nine-month sentence for the arson attack on the Penrhos "bombing school".
- November – A strike over safety concerns at the Ocean Coal Company's collieries originates at Risca.
- The South Wales Regional Council of Labour is formed.
- The parabolic arched church of Our Lady Star of the Sea and St Winefride, Amlwch, designed by Giuseppe Rinvolucri, is completed and consecrated.
- The Urdd launches the first Welsh books campaign.

== Arts and literature ==
- Summer - Literary magazine Wales first published, edited by Keidrych Rhys.
- James Gomer Berry becomes chairman of Kemsley Newspapers Ltd.
- The Prose Medal is awarded for the first time at the National Eisteddfod.

=== Awards ===
- National Eisteddfod of Wales (held in Machynlleth)
- National Eisteddfod of Wales: Chair – T. Rowland Hughes
- National Eisteddfod of Wales: Crown – J. M. Edwards
- National Eisteddfod of Wales: Prose Medal – J. O. Williams

=== New books ===
- Ambrose Bebb – Y Ddeddf Uno 1536
- David Jones – In Parenthesis
- Lewis Jones - Cwmardy
- Eiluned Lewis & Peter Lewis - The Land of Wales
- T. J. Morgan - Dal Llygoden Ac Ysgrifau Eraill
- John Cowper Powys - Morwyn: or The Vengeance of God
- Ernest Rhys – Song of the Sun
- Louie Myfanwy Thomas writing as Jane Ann Jones – Storïau Hen Ferch

=== Music ===
- Ivor Novello – Crest of the Wave (musical)
- Colin Ross – Ostinato

== Film ==
- Ray Milland appears in five new films, including Ebb Tide.

== Broadcasting ==
- 1 February – A new transmitter is opened at Penmon, Anglesey, to bring the West and Wales BBC Regional Programme to North Wales.
- 4 July – Following the alteration of frequencies at the BBC's Washford transmitting station to enable it to radiate separate regional services for South Wales and the West of England, the new Welsh Regional Programme begins, broadcast from Washford (across the Bristol Channel) on 1050 kHz and Penmon on 804 kHz.
- Radio programmes include: The Fascination of Brechfa, presented by G. Arbour Stevens

== Sport ==
- Billiards - Horace Coles wins the World Amateur Billiards Championship.
- Boxing
  - 15 March - Tommy Farr wins the British and Commonwealth heavyweight titles.
  - 30 August - Farr loses on points to Joe Louis.

== Births ==
- 8 January – Shirley Bassey, singer
- 22 January – Ryan Davies, entertainer (died 1977)
- 24 January – Trevor Edwards, footballer
- 18 February – Donald Braithwaite, boxer
- 13 March – Martin Thomas, Baron Thomas of Gresford, politician
- 21 March – Ann Clwyd, politician
- 22 April – Julian Cayo-Evans, political activist (died 1995)
- 26 April – Gareth Gwenlan, television producer (died 2016)
- 27 May – Danny Harris, rugby player
- 8 June
  - Gillian Clarke, poet
  - John Williams, snooker referee
- 14 August – Brian Curvis, welterweight boxer (died 2012)
- 7 September – Clive Everton, snooker commentator
- 14 September – Fenton Coles, rugby player
- 30 September – Gary Hocking, motorcycle road racer (died 1962)
- 5 October – Iwan Edwards, choral conductor (in Canada) (died 2022)
- 6 October – David Morgan, cricket administrator
- 19 October – Terence Thomas, banker (died 2018 in England)
- 30 October – Brian Price, rugby player
- 8 December – Malcolm Price, rugby player
- 30 December – Saunders Davies, Anglican bishop
- 31 December – Sir Anthony Hopkins, actor
- date unknown
  - Trebor Edwards, tenor
  - Prys Morgan, historian

== Deaths ==
- 15 January – Arthur Cheetham, pioneering film maker, 72
- 2 February – Hugh Ingledew, Wales international rugby player, 71
- April – Jack Doughty, footballer, 71
- 21 April – Kenneth Morris, Theosophist writer, 57
- 28 April – Frederick Guest, politician, 61
- 15 May – George Thomson, footballer, 82
- 18 May – Idwal Jones, schoolmaster, poet and dramatist, 41
- 20 May – Walter Davis, footballer, 48 (drowned)
- 5 June – Owen Cosby Philipps, 1st Baron Kylsant, shipping magnate, 74
- 26 June – Jackie Beynon, footballer (peritonitis)
- 22 July – Alfred George Edwards, former Archbishop of Wales, 88
- 2 October – Swansea Jack, retriever, 7
- 22 October – William Penfro Rowlands, hymn-writer, 77
- 23 October – Stephen Thomas, Wales international rugby player, 72
- 1 November – William Alexander, Wales international rugby player, 63
- 25 November – David Lewis Davies, politician, 64
- 26 December – Dan Beddoe, popular singer, 74

== See also ==
- 1937 in Northern Ireland
