= 1940 in Wales =

- Centuries: 18th; 19th; 20th; 21st
- Decades: 1920s; 1930s; 1940s; 1950s; 1960s
- See also: List of years in Wales; Timeline of Welsh history 1940 in The United Kingdom Scotland Elsewhere

This article is about the particular significance of the year 1940 to Wales and its people.

== Incumbents ==
- Archbishop of Wales – Charles Green, Bishop of Bangor
- Archdruid of the National Eisteddfod of Wales – Crwys

== Events ==
- 21 January - Lowest ever temperature recorded in Wales, −23.3 °C (−9.9 °F) at Rhayader.
- 27 January - A freak ice storm across the UK brings down telephone and electricity lines in many parts of Wales.
- 3 March - The steamer Cato is damaged by a mine off Nash Point and 13 of the crew are killed.
- March - The scenic railway opens at Barry Island Pleasure Park.
- May
  - The newly created Coalition Government includes Hugh Dalton as Minister of Economic Warfare.
  - Alun Lewis enlists.
- 8 May - Three Nazi German Luftwaffe Heinkel He 111s crash in separate incidents over Wales: one near Wrexham, one at Malpas in Denbighshire, and one at Bagillt, Flint. In all nine crew are killed and four captured.
- 3 July - Cardiff is bombed for the first time.
- 9 July - Cardiff suffers its first bombing fatalities.
- 10 July - Ten people are killed in an air raid on Swansea Docks, as shipping convoys become a target.
- 11 July - Communist minister and poet Thomas Evan Nicholas ("Niclas y Glais") and his son are arrested and interned for "endeavouring to impede recruitment to HM Forces". Nicholas is eventually released on 20 October.
- 11 August - Seventeen people are killed in an air raid on Manselton, Swansea.
- 14 August - Three German Heinkel 111s are shot down during an air-raid on Cardiff, and another over North Wales after a raid on RAF Hawarden.
- 22 August - A steamer, the Thorold, is sunk by German aircraft off the Skerries. Ten crew are killed.
- 2 September - 33 people are killed in an air raid on Swansea.
- 3 September - Eleven people are killed in an air raid on Cardiff.
- 4 September - A German Junkers Ju 88 crashes near Machynlleth. Four crew and a Gestapo officer are captured.
- 13 September - A German Heinkel 111 crashes into a house in Newport, Monmouthshire.
- 22 November - The steamer Pikepool is damaged by a mine off Linney Head, Pembrokeshire, with the loss of 17 crew.
- The Urdd changes its policy to include 16- to 25-year-olds.
- Gwilym Williams becomes chaplain of St David's College, Lampeter.
- Percy Cudlipp becomes editor of the Daily Herald.
- Alun Talfan Davies and his brother Aneirin found the publishing house Llyfrau'r Dryw.

== Arts and literature ==
- Lewis Casson directs John Gielgud in King Lear.

=== Awards ===
- National Eisteddfod of Wales (held in Bangor (radio))
- National Eisteddfod of Wales: Chair - withheld
- National Eisteddfod of Wales: Crown - T. Rowland Hughes
- National Eisteddfod of Wales: Prose Medal - withheld

=== New books ===
- Richard Bennett - Cyfrol Goffa Richard Bennett
- Clara Novello Davies - The Life I Have Loved
- David Delta Edwards - Rhedeg ar ôl y Cysgodion
- John Cowper Powys - Owen Glendower (U.S. publication)
- Howard Spring - Fame is the Spur
- Ransom Riggs - Miss Peregrine's Home for Peculiar Children (published 2011; partially set in Wales, 1940)

=== Music ===
- Mai Jones & Lyn Joshua - "We'll Keep a Welcome" (performed for the first time in the forces' variety show, Welsh Rarebit on 29 February)
- Grace Williams - Fantasia on Welsh Nursery Tunes (score dated 9 February)

== Film ==
- March 25 - Plaza Cinema opens in Port Talbot.
- April 6 - Paul Robeson and Rachel Thomas star in The Proud Valley (cinematic release)

== Broadcasting ==
- 25 February - The Proud Valley is the first film to have its première on radio, when the BBC broadcasts a 60-minute version.
- May - The BBC Radio Variety Department relocates to Bangor because of wartime disruption; it will broadcast from here until August 1943.
- August - The National Eisteddfod of Wales is broadcast on the British Home Service, including 15 minutes each for the crown and chair ceremonies.

== Sport ==
- Football
  - 13 April - Wales defeat England 1 - 0.
- Quoits - Jack Price wins the Welsh championship for the third time.

== Births ==
- 4 January - Brian Josephson, theoretical physicist
- 17 January - Leighton Rees, darts champion (died 2003)
- 23 January - Ted Rowlands, politician
- 1 March - David Broome, show jumping champion
- 16 May - Sir Gareth Roberts, physicist (died 2007)
- 7 June - Tom Jones, singer
- 29 June - John Dawes, rugby player (died 2021)
- 17 July - C. W. Nicol, Japanese writer and environmentalist (died 2020 in Japan)
- 3 September - Eduardo Hughes Galeano, Uruguayan writer of Welsh descent
- 20 September - Anna Pavord, gardening writer
- 1 October - Atarah Ben-Tovim, flautist and children's concert promoter (died 2022)
- 14 October - Christopher Timothy, actor
- 31 October - Eric Griffiths, skiffle guitarist with The Quarrymen (died 2005)
- 4 November - Daniel Sperber, Talmudic scholar
- 30 November - Peter Shreeves, footballer, coach and manager
- 5 December
  - Michael Jones, medieval historian
  - "Exotic" Adrian Street, professional wrestler (died 2023)
- 24 December - John Marek, politician
- date unknown
  - Donald Evans, Welsh-language poet
  - Keith Miles, detective novelist and screenwriter

== Deaths ==
- 12 February - William Edwards, educationist, 89
- 21 February - Sir Alfred Edward Lewis, banker, 71
- 15 March - John Davies, author, 71
- 20 March - William Thomas Edwards (Gwilym Deudraeth), poet
- 7 April - Ernest Rowland, priest and Wales international rugby player, 75
- 27 April - Fred Cornish, Wales international rugby player
- 23 May - Hugh Hesketh Hughes, polo player, 37 (killed in action)
- 4 June - Owen Picton Davies, businessman and politician, 68
- 25 June - Stanley Winmill, Wales international rugby union player, 51
- 3 July - George Bevan Bowen, landowner, 82
- 8 August - Daniel Lleufer Thomas, lawyer and biographer, 76
- 20 August - Henry Maldwyn Hughes, Wesleyan minister
- 26 September - W. H. Davies, poet and author, 69
- 9 October - Sir Wilfred Grenfell, medical missionary to Newfoundland and Labrador
- 9 November - Gwilym Owen, physicist
- 15 December
  - Robert Thomas Jones, quarrymen's leader, 66
  - Sir David Richard Llewellyn, 1st Baronet, industrialist

== See also ==
- 1940 in Northern Ireland
