= 1933 in Wales =

- Centuries: 18th; 19th; 20th; 21st
- Decades: 1910s; 1920s; 1930s; 1940s; 1950s
- See also: List of years in Wales; Timeline of Welsh history 1933 in The United Kingdom Scotland Elsewhere

This article is about the particular significance of the year 1933 to Wales and its people.

== Incumbents ==
- Archbishop of Wales – Alfred George Edwards, Bishop of St Asaph
- Archdruid of the National Eisteddfod of Wales – Gwili

== Events ==
- 1 March (Saint David's Day) – A flag displaying the red Welsh Dragon flies officially alongside the Union Jack over Caernarfon Castle.
- 28 March - Rhondda East by-election: William Mainwaring retains the seat for Labour against Communist and Liberal opposition.
- 18 April - 28 people are injured at Cockett railway station when a locomotive travelling from Swansea to Neyland collides with the rear of the stationary 11.55 am Paddington to Milford Haven train.
- June/July – Seven men and four women receive custodial sentences after a riot at Bedwas over strikebreaking.
- 22 July – Amy Johnson and Jim Mollison take off from Pendine on the first non-stop aeroplane flight from Great Britain to the United States.
- Ronald Lockley establishes the first British bird observatory on Skokholm.

== Arts and literature ==
- April–May – Dylan Thomas's poem And death shall have no dominion is written and published.
- June - The first Gregynog Music Festival, Wales' oldest extant classical music festival, is organised by the sisters Margaret and Gwendoline Davies (granddaughters of Victorian industrialist David Davies) at their home, Gregynog Hall in Tregynon, Montgomeryshire.
- Percy Cudlipp becomes editor of the Evening Standard – the youngest ever editor of a British national newspaper.

=== Awards ===
- National Eisteddfod of Wales (held in Wrexham)
- National Eisteddfod of Wales: Chair – Edgar Phillips
- National Eisteddfod of Wales: Crown – Simon B. Jones

=== New books ===
==== English language ====
- D. J. Davies – The Economic History of South Wales
- A. H. Dodd – The Industrial Revolution in North Wales
- Caradoc Evans – Wasps
- Margiad Evans – The Wooden Doctor
- Lily Tobias - Eunice Fleet

==== Welsh language ====
- John Bodvan Anwyl - Fy hanes i fy hunan
- Gwilym Owen – Rhyfeddodau'r Cread
- Isaac Morris – Proffwydi'r Wythfed Ganrif Cyn Crist

=== Music ===
- Ieuan Rees-Davies – Transposition at the keyboard (manual)

== Film ==
- Ivor Novello stars in I Lived with You, Sleeping Car, and Autumn Crocus.

== Broadcasting ==
- 28 May – The BBC begins broadcasting the Welsh Regional Programme to South Wales from the Washford transmitter
- 17 July – The BBC begins broadcasting the National Programme to South Wales from the Washford transmitter
- The first broadcast is made from the Urdd Eisteddfod.

== Sport ==
- Rugby union, although collecting the 'wooden spoon' in the Home Nations Championship, Wales beat England at Twickenham for the very first time, after ten previous attempts.

== Births ==
- 2 January – Keith Thomas, early modern historian and academic
- 7 February – Stuart Burrows, opera singer
- 21 March – Michael Heseltine, politician
- 3 April – Alan Watkins, political journalist (d. 2010)
- 22 April – Anthony Llewellyn, Welsh-American scientist (d. 2013)
- 14 May – Siân Phillips, actress
- 20 June
  - Dai Dower, British, European and Empire flyweight boxing champion
  - Dorothy Simpson, detective fiction writer
- 30 June – John Faull, Wales international and British Lions rugby player
- 17 August – Jack Hurrell, Wales international rugby union player (d. 2003)
- 1 September – Bedwyr Lewis Jones, writer and scholar (d. 1992)
- 12 September – Len Allchurch, footballer (d. 2016)
- 24 September – Terry Davies, Wales rugby captain and British Lion (d. 2021)
- 25 September – David Parry-Jones, rugby commentator (d. 2017)
- 12 November – Jeffrey Thomas, politician (d. 1989)
- 17 November – Alan Harrington, footballer (d. 2019)
- 28 November – Noel Trigg, light heavyweight boxer
- 31 December – Glyn Davidge, Wales international and British Lions rugby player

== Deaths ==
- 8 January – Sir John Ballinger, librarian, 72
- 14 January – Sir Robert Jones, orthopaedic surgeon (baronet), 75
- 18 January – John Thomas, chemist (ICI), 46
- 2 February – Sir James Cory, 1st Baronet, politician, 76
- 15 February – Jere Blake, Wales international rugby player, 47/48
- 23 February – David Watts Morgan, Member of Parliament for Rhondda East, 65
- 4 April – Sir Marteine Lloyd, 2nd Baronet, 82
- 29 May – Llewelyn Kenrick, footballer, 84
- 16 July – John Tudor Walters, politician, 64/65
- 10 August – Alf Morgans, Prime Minister of Western Australia, 83
- 13 September – David Morgan, Wales international rugby player, 61
- 20 September – Alfred Cattell, Wales international rugby player, 76
- 17 October – Sid Bevan, Wales international rugby union player, 56
- 18 October – Ivor Herbert, 1st Baron Treowen, soldier and politician, 82
- 10 November – Herbert Lewis, politician, 74

== See also ==
- 1933 in Northern Ireland
