= Edward Owen =

Edward Owen may refer to:

- Edward Owen (translator) (1728/29–1807), Welsh Anglican priest, headmaster and translator
- Edward Owen (Royal Navy officer) (1771–1849), commander-in-chief, Mediterranean Fleet
- Edward Maes Llaned Owen (1846–1931), Welsh engineer and pioneer in Y Wladfa
- Eddie Owen (runner) (1886–1949), British middle and long-distance runner
- Edward Owen (rugby) (1903–?), Welsh rugby union and professional rugby league footballer
- Edward Owen (artist) (died 1741), Welsh artist and minor noble
- Roger Owen (historian) (Edward Roger John Owen, 1935–2018), British historian
- Edward Owen (Paralympian) (1946–2008), American Paralympian
- Edward Pryce Owen (1788–1863), English artist
- Edward Owen (priest) (died 1833), archdeacon of St Davids

== See also ==
- Edward Owens (disambiguation)
- Ted Owens (disambiguation)
