= James Mathias =

James Mathias may refer to:

- James Goronwy Mathias (1842–1895), Baptist minister and writer
- James N. Mathias Jr. (born 1951), American politician in Maryland
