= James Goronwy Mathias =

Baptist minister and littérateur

James Goronwy Mathias (1842–1895), also known under the pen name Goronwy Ddu, was a Baptist minister and writer.

== Religious life ==
Mathias was born in Manchester but moved to Penrhyn-Coch when he was young. In 1873, he moved to Aberdare and joined Ynys-lwyd chapel, before moving to Rhymney Valley in 1874 to become pastor of Bethania chapel, Troedrhiw'r-fuwch. In 1875, he took pastoral charge of Ramah and Erwood, Brecknock and later (in 1881) Llansantffraid and Glyndyfrdwy. From 1887 he retired to Corwen but resumed the role of pastor in 1893 at Pontlottyn until his death.

== Literary activities ==
Mathias made his breakthrough as a writer while living in Corwen. He founded, and was editor of, Y Llenor Cymreig published in Corwen between January 1882 and October 1883. He also edited and helped co-write Hanes Bywyd C. H. Spurgeon, 1892. Writing under the pseudonym Goronwy Ddu, his works include:

- Yr Ystorgell, 1872
- Y Gorsen, 1872
- Yr Eginyn, 1874
- Y Dywysen, 1874
- Y Dywysen Aeddfed, 1875

== Death ==
James Goronwy Mathias died on 18 February 1895 aged 53. He is buried at Erwood.

== See also ==
- Seren Cymru, 29 March 1895
- The Baptist Union of Wales Handbook and Diary, 1896
- Notable Welshmen (1700–1900), 1908
- Eminent Welshmen: a short biographical dictionary of Welshmen ... from the earliest times to the present, 1908
- Geiriadur Bywgraffiadol, yn cynnwys Byr-hanes y Cymry mwyaf adnabyddus fuont yn preswylio yn Manceinion, 1896
- Cardiff Free Libraries, Catalogue of Printed Literature in the Welsh Department, 1898
- David Jenkins, O Blas Gogerddan i Horeb (Taith Dwy Ganrif), Aberystwyth, 1933.
