= Edward Owens =

Edward Owens may refer to:

- Edward William James Owens (1860–1928), Canadian lawyer and politician
- Edward Owens (filmmaker) (1949–2009), African-American filmmaker and director
- Eddie Owens (born 1953), American basketball player
- Ed Owens (1950–1971), American basketball player
- Edward Owens (hoax), a fictional character, part of a hoax created in 2008

== See also ==
- Ted Owens (disambiguation)
- Edward Owen (disambiguation)
