= Ted Owens =

Ted or Teddy Owens may refer to:

- Ted Owens (basketball) (born 1929), fifth head basketball coach of the Kansas Jayhawks
- Ted Owens (contactee) (1920–1987), who claimed contact with a UFO
- Teddy Owens, Gaelic footballer, trainer for Cork in 2007 All-Ireland Senior Football Championship Final
- Ted Owens (footballer) (1913–1980), English association footballer (Crystal Palace and Preston North End)

== See also ==
- Edward Owens (disambiguation)
- Edward Owen (disambiguation)
