= Taigwynion =

Village in Ceredigion, Wales

Coordinates: 52.464671°N 4.014090°W

- Location within Ceredigion
- Population: 27
- OS grid reference: SN632871
- Community: Geneu'r Glyn
- Principal area: Ceredigion
- Preserved county: Dyfed
- Country: Wales
- Sovereign state: United Kingdom
- Post town: Bow Street
- Postcode district: SY24
- Dialling code: 01970
- Police: Dyfed-Powys
- Fire: Mid and West Wales
- Ambulance: Welsh
- UK Parliament: Ceredigion Preseli
- Senedd Cymru – Welsh Parliament: Ceredigion Penfro

Taigwynion (also spelt as Tai-gwynion) is a hamlet 1 km ENE of Llandre in Ceredigion, Wales. It has 11 houses and a postcode of its own, SY24 5AG.

== Toponymy ==
Taigwynion has no English name and is formed as a compound name from the Welsh word 'tai', plural of 'ty' (house) and 'gwynion' (white). The direct English translation of Taigwynion is 'White Houses' which suggests that the original houses were whitewashed. However prior to the acquisition of the locality by the Pryse family, the Gogerddan estate maps indicate that the area was owned by 'Lewis Gwynne' and that the hamlet name might originate from the 'houses of gwynne'. The hamlet was well-established prior to the first census records in 1841.

== Geography ==
Borth, Ynyslas and the north end of Llandre are the only immediate habitations visible from Taigwynion. The Llŷn Peninsula from Mynydd y Rhiw to Criccieth is visible on the horizon. As an inhabitation it is well connected by a series of footpaths to Llandre, Glanfread to the north and by a bridleway eastwards to Pwllglas. It is located on the 75 m contour and faces the northwest.

A stream arising on land belonging to Pwllglas farm above Taigwynion runs through Taigwynion and Llandre to join the River Ceiro at Aberceiro, south of Llandre. It is piped under the road for most of its course through Llandre and only reappears immediately south of Llandre itself alongside the railway.

== History ==
Historically it was populated by agricultural labourers, weavers and carpenters.

The poet and former Archdruid John James Williams was born in Taigwynion.

== Dwellings ==
The houses are a mix of relatively new and older houses. The last new house was occupied in 1993.

Decade built	Historical	1900	1910	1920	1930	1940	1950	1960	1970	1980	1990
No dwellings	2	-	2	-	-	-	-	1	3	1	2

== Events ==
- Riverside Caravan Park, 0.5 km north of Taigwynion, was flooded after the June 9, 2013 rain and received widespread coverage in the media.
- Farmbox Meats Ltd, 0.5 km northwest of Taigwynion, was raided in the horsemeat scandal.
