= Richard Hughes Williams =

Welsh language writer

Richard Hughes Williams (1878 – 26 July 1919), or Dic Tryfan, was a Welsh language writer of short stories, born in Rhosgadfan in the old county of Caernarfonshire (Gwynedd), north Wales. Most of his stories are set in the slate-quarrying communities of his native Caernarfonshire. He was known to the renowned Welsh novelist Kate Roberts, an early admirer of his work who grew up in the same area.

== Work ==
Richard Hughes Williams's stories were first published in Papur Pawb, Cymru, Yr Herald Gymraeg and Y Goleuad, and appeared in two collections during his lifetime: Straeon y Chwarel and Tair Stori Fer. A posthumous selection of his work was published with an introduction by E. Morgan Humphreys, and in a second edition containing an additional short story and an additional critical essay by John Rowlands, in 1996.

Richard Hughes Williams's stories are commonly set among the men who work at the slate quarries, and highlight both physical hardship and danger they endure, and their good humour, courage, and solidarity. Often they focus on a quarryman of unusual eccentricity or poverty, and sketch the incidents, humorous and tragic, that lead to his early death.

== Critical reception and translation ==
In a critical article in Taliesin (1962) Kate Roberts criticises the weaknesses in his writing technique, finding his deathbed endings unrealistic and sentimental, and his extensive use of dialogue unnecessary. Moreover, despite the humorous treatment of his characters' eccentricities, she finds them passive in their role in his plots, and therefore unmemorable. By contrast E. Morgan Humphreys, in his introduction to the stories, praises his concise and disciplined prose, and his ability to reveal character within a few lines, and asserts his seminal role within the development of the Welsh short story.

One of Hughes Williams's stories, 'Yr Hogyn Drwg', appeared in English translation by Dafydd Rowlands. There is also a translation of his work by Rob Mimpriss.

== Bibliography ==
- Richard Hughes Williams. Tair Stori Fer. Wrexham: Hughes a'i Fab, 1916.
- Richard Hughes Williams. Straeon y Chwarel. Introduction by T. Gwynn Jones. Caernarfon: Cwmni y Cyhoeddwyr Cymreig, 1914?.
- Richard Hughes Williams. Storïau Richard Hughes Williams. Introduction by E. Morgan Humphreys. Wrexham: Hughes a'i Fab, 1932.
- Richard Hughes Williams. Storïau Richard Hughes Williams. 2nd edition. Introduction by E. Morgan Humphreys. Introduction to the 2nd edition by John Rowlands. Cardiff: Hughes a'i Fab, 1994. ISBN 0 85284 149 3
- Kate Roberts. ‘Richard Hughes Williams.’ Taliesin 5 (1962), 5-17.
- Richard Hughes Williams. 'Good-for-Nothing.' Translation by Dafydd Rowlands. In The Second Penguin Book of Welsh Short Stories. Edited by Alun Richards. Harmondsworth: Penguin, 1994. ISBN 0140168710
- Richard Hughes Williams. Going South: The stories of Richard Hughes Williams. Translated by Rob Mimpriss. Cockatrice Books, 2017. ISBN 1912368099
