= Edward Morgan Humphreys =

British journalist and writer

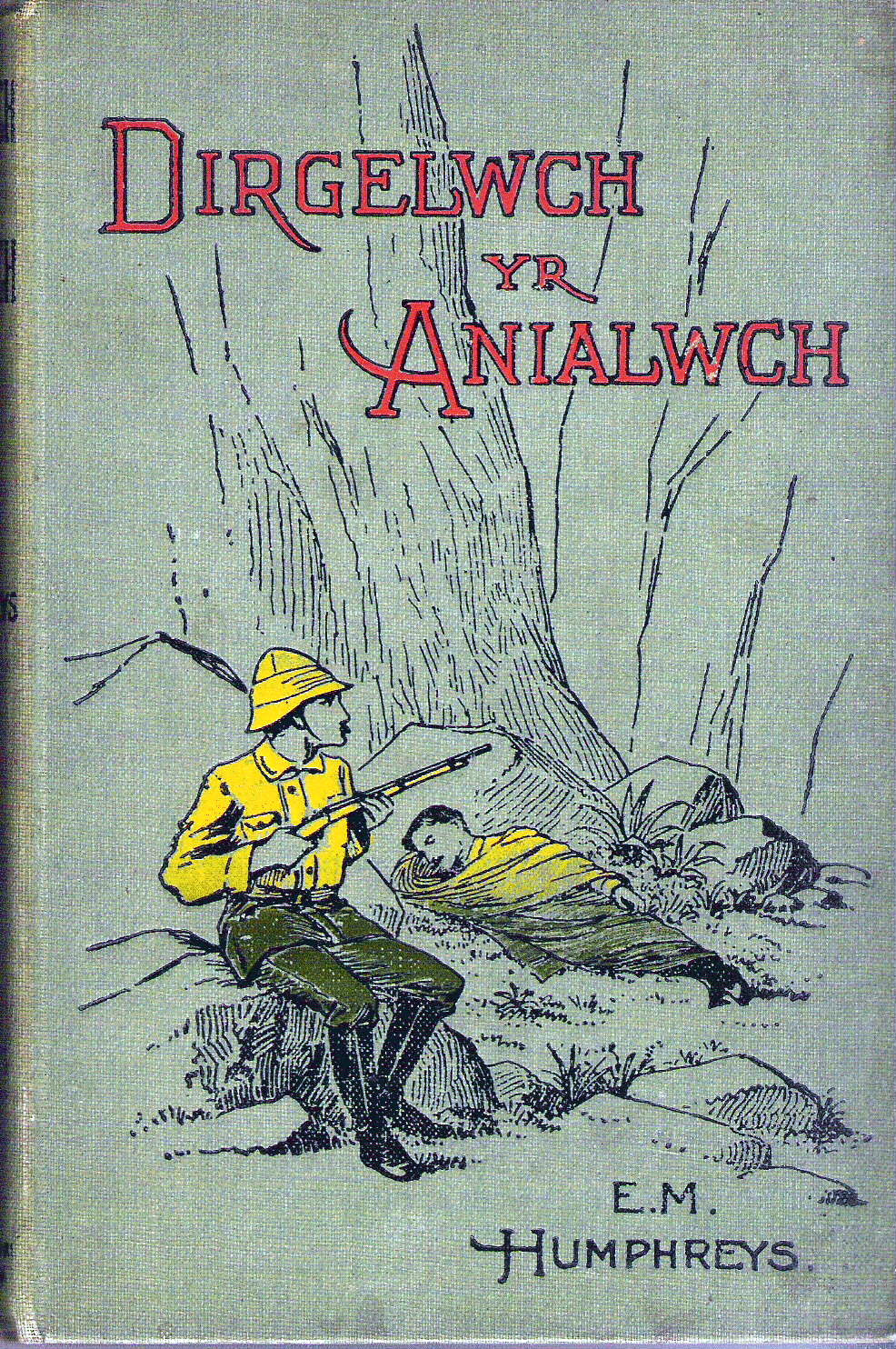
Cover of an Edward Morgan Humphreys book

Edward Morgan Humphreys OBE, (1882–1955) was a Welsh novelist, translator, and journalist, often known as E. Morgan Humphreys. He also sometimes wrote under the pseudonym Celt.

Humphreys edited Y Genedl Gymreig and translated The Gorse Glen by Hugh Evans into English. He also wrote about socialism.

He was made an Officer of the Order of the British Empire in 1953.
