= Owen Owen (school inspector) =

Welsh teacher and school inspector

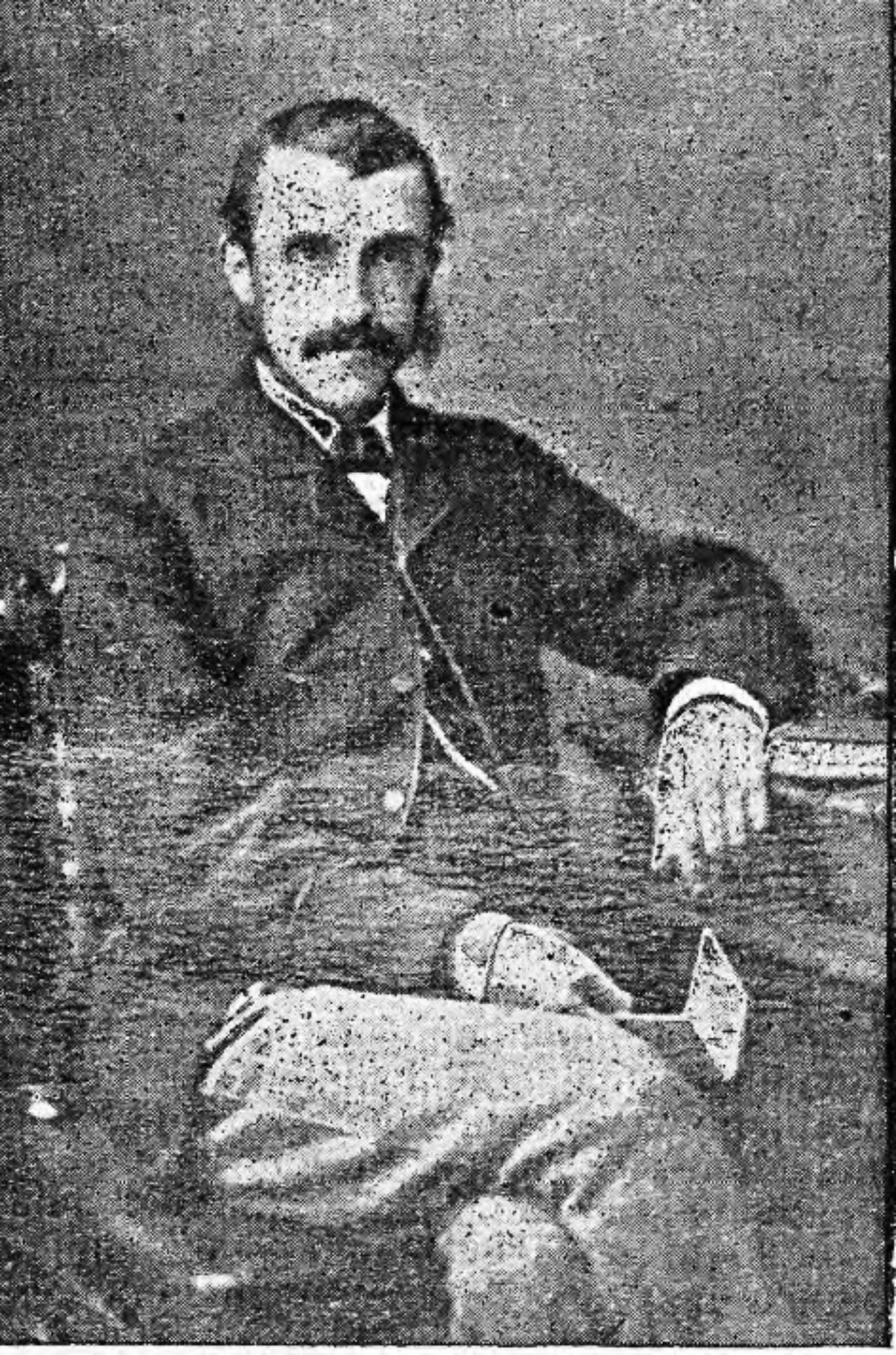
Owen in 1897

Owen Owen (1850 – 14 March 1920) was a Welsh schoolteacher who, after being headmaster of a successful private school for boys in Oswestry, Shropshire, became the first Chief Inspector of the Central Welsh Board for Intermediate Education.

== Life ==
Owen was born in the parish of Llaniestyn, on the Llŷn Peninsula in North Wales. He was educated at Botwnnog grammar school (as was his cousin John Owen, who later became Bishop of St Davids). From there, he proceeded to Jesus College, Oxford where he matriculated in 1873. In 1877, he graduated with a B.A. degree in Literae Humaniores, obtaining his M.A. in 1882. In about 1878, he became headmaster of the Willow Street Academy, a private school in Oswestry, Shropshire. In the 1881 census, the school was recorded as having fourteen boarders aged from ten to twenty four, and a schoolmaster and a housekeeper in addition to Owen. The school’s success led, in 1883, to the purchase of new premises—a house called The Lawn, on Church Street, Oswestry, that had previously been the residence of members of a local wealthy family—and the school was known as Oswestry High School, or the Boys High School. Owen remained as headmaster and the excellent record of the school led to it drawing pupils from across Wales.

The Welsh Intermediate Education Act was passed in 1889, and Owen was co-secretary of the joint conferences set up to establish the schemes to be implemented at county level. In 1896, the Central Welsh Board for Intermediate Education was established, with Arthur Humphreys-Owen (Member of Parliament for Montgomeryshire) as its first chairman and John Viriamu Jones (the first vice-chancellor of the University of Wales) as vice-chairman. The Board had the responsibility of overseeing the Welsh Intermediate Schools, and this was done through an annual examination and inspection. Owen was appointed as the Board’s first chief inspector in 1896. He held the position until 1915, when illness compelled his retirement, and was regarded as having held the office "with exceptional ability and conscientiousness". He was succeeded in the post by William Edwards, a former fellow of Jesus College. After his enforced retirement, he moved to Colwyn Bay on the coast of North Wales, where he died on 14 March 1920; he was buried in the cemetery at Rhos-on-Sea (Llandrillo-yn-Rhos).

As well as educational matters, his interests included music and politics, with a particular interest in the movement for disestablishment of the Anglican church in Wales. He also served as a justice of the peace in Oswestry from 1893.
