= William Edwards (school inspector) =

Welsh school inspector

William Edwards (22 January 1851 – 12 February 1940) was a Welsh school inspector for nearly 50 years and a writer on educational topics.

== Life ==
Edwards was born in Denbigh, North Wales, and after being educated in Denbigh and at the Liverpool Institute, studied at The Queen's College, Oxford. He matriculated in 1869, and obtained first-class degrees in Classics and in Mathematics (B.A. 1873, M.A. 1876). He was appointed a Fellow of Jesus College, Oxford in 1874, holding this position until 1877.

In 1877, Edwards was appointed as one of Her Majesty's inspectors of schools and thereafter spent thirty-eight years inspecting schools in Glamorgan, South Wales. In 1884, he was an unsuccessful candidate for the post of first principal of the new University College of North Wales, Bangor, the position going to Harry Reichel. Reaching retirement age in 1915, he nonetheless accepted the invitation of the Central Welsh Board for Intermediate Education to succeed Owen Owen as chief inspector. He became a member of the Secondary Schools Examination Council in 1920. He wrote extensively on the subject of education, suggesting in 1929 in A New Proposal that a school certificate should be issued to each pupil, giving information about the value of the pupil's work in every subject examined. He retired in 1926, having been given an honorary LL.D. degree by the University of Wales in 1925. Edwards died in Merthyr Tydfil, where he had long lived, on 12 February 1940.
