= Glyn Davies (footballer, born 1932) =

Welsh footballer

Personal information
- Date of birth: 31 May 1932
- Place of birth: Swansea, Wales
- Date of death: 7 February 2013 (aged 80)
- Place of death: Swansea, Wales
- Position: Defender

Senior career*
Years	Team	Apps	(Gls)
1953–1962	Derby County	200	(5)
1962–1964	Swansea Town	17	(1)
1964–1965	Yeovil Town		
- Pembroke Borough
Total		217+	(6+)

Managerial career
- 1964–1965: Yeovil Town (Player-manager)
- 1965–1966: Swansea Town
- * Club domestic league appearances and goals

Glyn Davies (31 May 1932 – 7 February 2013) was a Welsh professional footballer who made 217 appearances in the Football League playing as a defender for Derby County and Swansea Town. Davies then became player-manager of Southern League side Yeovil Town, before in 1965 he was appointed Swansea Town manager, with Yeovil receiving a fee in the region of £1,250 as compensation.

After his spell as manager for Swansea City, he was player-coach at Pembroke Borough.
