= John Davies (author) =

Welsh author (1868–1940)

- Born: 23 October 1868 Betws yn Rhos, Wales
- Died: 15 March 1940 (aged 71) Cardiff, Wales
- Resting place: Llanishen, Cardiff

John Davies (23 October 1868 – 15 March 1940) was a Welsh author from Betws yn Rhos, near Abergele. Davies received his education from the Liverpool Institute. He was employed for many years as a clerk for the Great Western Railway at Newport, Cardiff and Bridgwater. Following his retirement he travelled widely, examining manuscripts and collecting materials with the intention of producing a substantial biography of the 18th-century antiquary Moses Williams. The work was completed and published in 1937 by the University of Wales Press.

Davies died in Cardiff in March 1940 and was buried at Llanishen.
