= Geraint Goodwin =

Welsh journalist and novelist

Arthur Geraint Goodwin (1 May 1903 – 10 October 1941) was a Welsh journalist, novelist and short story writer from near Newtown, Montgomeryshire, who wrote about rural life on the Welsh border. His first novel, published in 1935, was the autobiographical Call Back Yesterday. Goodwin's most acclaimed work, The Heyday in the Blood, appeared in 1936, and his last novel, Come Michaelmas, appeared in 1939. In 1975, The Heyday in the Blood was translated into Welsh.

== Biography ==
He was born in the village of Llanllwchaearn, on the outskirts of Newtown, Montgomeryshire, the son of Richard Goodwin (1862–1911) and Mary Jane (Watkin, née Lewis) Goodwin (1862–1943). His father died when he was eight, and his mother married the almost twenty years younger Frank Humphreys when he was twelve. This marriage was his mother's third and Humphreys' second. Goodwin apparently got on well with his stepfather, and Frank Humphreys', and his mother's, love for the outdoors - especially fishing and rough shooting - were an important influence on him.

He attended Tywyn County School as a boarder at the age of thirteen, and when he left school, he initially worked on The Montgomeryshire Express. Then in 1923, he moved to London to work in a News Agency and later as a reporter for The Daily Sketch. Goodwin's stepfather had two sons, around Goodwin's age, who had become journalists.

In 1930 he was diagnosed with tuberculosis (TB) and spent several months in a sanitorium. Then in October 1932 he married a fellow journalist from Yorkshire, Rhoda Storey (1902–1991). Out of his experience of TB came his first novel, the autobiographical Call Back Yesterday (1935). The success of this novel led to Cape offering him a contract for two further books and Goodwin and his family moved to Hertfordshire and he became a full-time writer. Following Goodwin's Call Back Yesterday in 1936 came his most acclaimed work, The Heyday in the Blood. This novel contrasts the old and declining ways of a village on the Welsh Border with new ways of England, where many migrate, and is a vibrant work of both tragedy and farcical comedy.

In 1938 they moved to Corris Uchaf, near Machynlleth, where Goodwin wrote his last novel Come Michaelmas (1939), which is set in a barely disguised Newtown. The same year he became ill again and spent sometime in the sanitarium at Talgarth, on the edge of the Black Mountains. While the family moved to Montgomery, Geraint Goodwin's health continued to deteriorate and he died aged 38 from TB in Montgomery, survived by his wife and a son and a daughter.

== Reputation ==
As Kate Gramich comments, although he left only "a handful of novels and short stories" these are works which "are still extraordinarily fresh and vigorous". In 1975 The Heyday in the Blood was translated into Welsh.

== Bibliography ==
=== Works ===
- Conversations with George Moore London: Ernest Benn Ltd., 1929: Knopf: New York, 1930; London: Jonathan Cape, 1937.
- A First Sheaf London School of Print, c.1930.
- Call Back Yesterday London, Jonathan Cape, 1935.
- The Heyday in the Blood 1936; London: Penguin,1954; (Library of Wales series) Parthian Books, 2008.
- The White Farm and Other Stories London: Jonathan Cape, [1937]. Bath: Cedric Chivers,1969 [Portway Reprints].
- Watch for the Morning London: Jonathan Cape, 1938; Bath: Cedric Chivers, 1969 [Portway Reprints].
- Come Michaelmas 1939. Bath: Chivers, 1969 [Portway Reprints].
- The Collected Short Stories of Geraint Goodwin, ed. Sam Adams and Roland Mathias, Tenby, Wales: H.G. Walters, 1976.
- My People. Short Stories Bridgend: Seren, 1987).
- Shearing and Other Stories, ed. Meic Stephens. Llanrwst : Gwasg Carreg Gwalch, 2004.

=== Short stories and articles ===
- “Mary Webb.” The Everyman, 2 May 1929, pp. 14–15.
- "The Flying Hours Are Gone" Lovat Dickson’s Magazine February 1935.
- "Saturday Night" The English Review March 1937.
- "Janet Ifans’ Donkey" Argosy (UK) January 1939.
- "The Lost Land" The Welsh Review April 1939.
- "Ap Town" The Welsh Review November 1939.
- "A Sitting of Eggs" Lilliput August 1941.
- "Young Bull" Argosy (UK) April 1944.

=== Anthologies containing stories ===
- Adams, S., & Mathias, R. The Shining Pyramid and Other Stories by Welsh authors. Llandysul: Gwasg Gomer, 1970.
- Davies, J. The Green bridge: Stories from Wales. Bridgend, Mid Glamorgan: Seren, 1988.
- Evans, G. E. Welsh short stories. London: Faber and Faber, 1959.
- Jones, G., & Elis, I. F. Twenty-five Welsh Stories. London: Oxford University Press, 1971.
- --..-- Classic Welsh Short Stories. Oxford: Oxford University Press, 1992.

=== Welsh translations ===
- Bwrlwm yn y Gwaed. The Heyday in the Blood, translated into Welsh by Mair Closs Roberts, Caernarfon: Jonathan Cape, 1975
- Hyfryd fore, translated Mair Closs Roberts. Wales: Gwasg Pantycelyn, 1980.

=== Biography and criticism ===
- Adams, Sam. Geraint Goodwin. (Writers of Wales) Cardiff: University of Wales Press, 1975.
- Adams, Sam. "Geraint Goodwin: A Montgomeryshire Writer and his Characters". Planet (29), 30–4. 1975.
- Goodwin, Rhoda. "The Geraint Goodwin – Edward Garnett Letters". Anglo-Welsh Review, 22.49 (1973): 10,23, 119–49.
- Helgasson, M. B., "Overcoming differences: The border writing of Geraint Goodwin and Margiad Evans". M.A. in English Literature, University of Swansea, 2001.
- Knight, S. T. A Hundred Years of Fiction: Writing Wales in English. Cardiff: University of Wales Press, 2004.
- Massey, Reg, "Geraint Goodwin". PenCambria No.9, Winter 2008
- Oldham, Mary "Geraint Goodwin". The Newtonian (the journal of the Newtown local history group), Summer 2008.
- Rees, David M. "Geraint Goodwin; A Neglected Anglo-Welsh Writer". Anglo-Welsh Review, 16.38 (1967): 126–9.
- Whetter, James Charles Arthur. Geraint Goodwin: His Life and Work. St Austell, Cornwall: Lyfrow Trelyspen, 2012.
