= Sea Roads =

Coordinates: 51.427927°N 3.171770°W

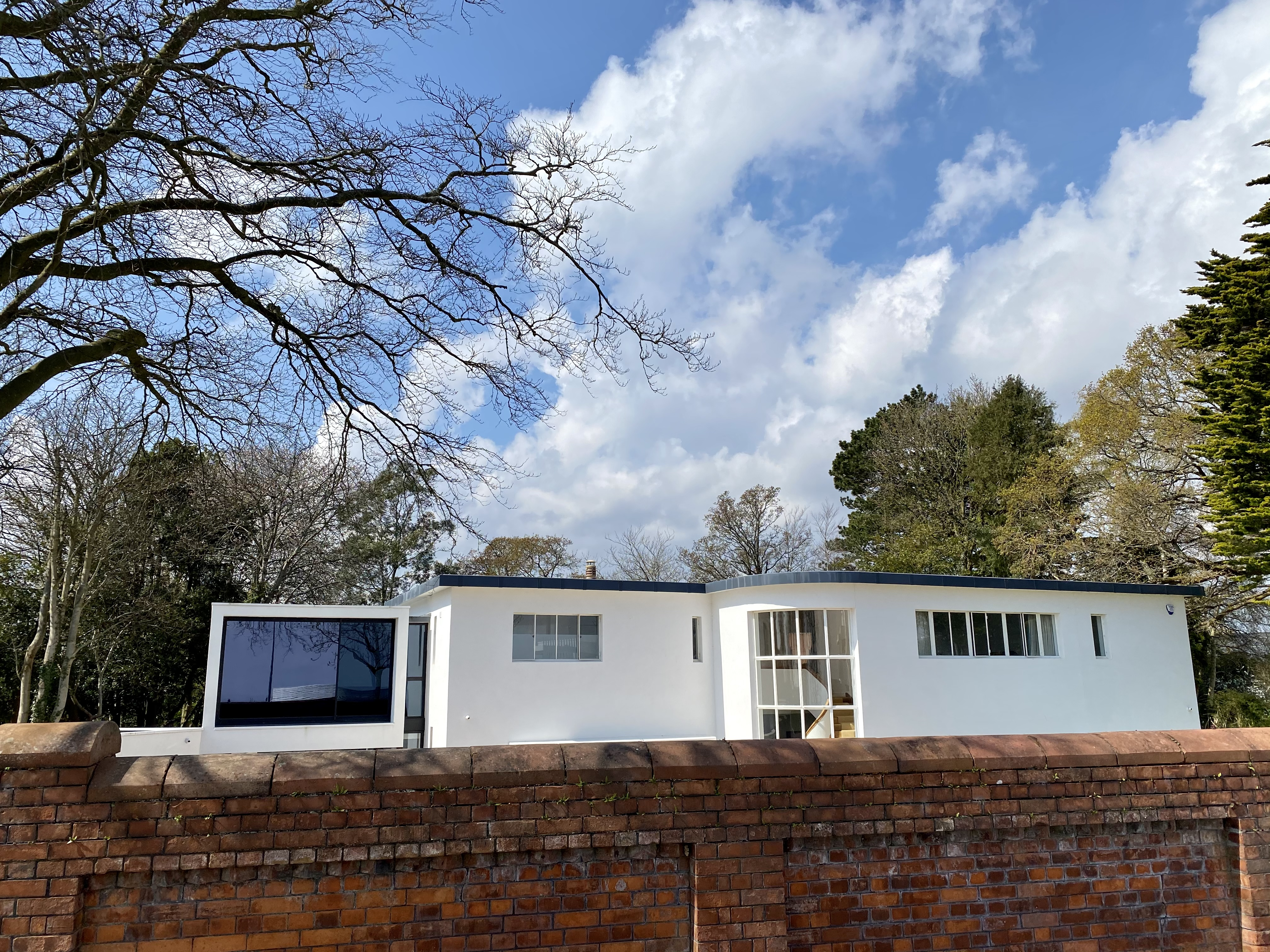
Sea Roads in April 2021

Sea Roads is a detached house in Penarth in the Vale of Glamorgan noted for its distinctive Modernist design.

It was designed by the Welsh architect Gordon Griffiths for John Gibbs and built in 1939. It is a rare example of Modernist domestic architecture of the 1930s in Wales; featuring typical Modernist details of white walls, flat roofs and a curved internal staircase framed by a full height window. The house was originally created with four bedrooms with accommodation for domestic staff, though it has been expanded since into six bedrooms with two bathrooms. All of the main rooms of the house and four of the bedrooms overlook the garden.

It is situated on Cliff Parade in Penarth.

The Cadw listing describes Sea Roads as an "exceptionally well-preserved modernist house" and notes its "expressive use" of windows to demonstrate the curvature of the facades and the internal organisation of the interior. The interior was "virtually intact" at the time of its 2006 listing.

It has been listed Grade II by Cadw since August 2006.

It was for sale in 2012 for £1.35 million, it was subsequently reduced to £1.1 million in 2014 (equivalent to £1,555,716 in 2023).
