= Philip Jones (civil servant) =

Welsh businessman and civil servant (1931-2000)

Sir (Thomas) Philip Jones CB FRSA (13 July 1931 – 19 July 2000) was a Welsh businessman and civil servant. After a career in the Civil Service, he was chairman of Total Oil Marine from 1990 to 1998 and Total Oil Holdings from 1991 to 1998. He was chairman of the Higher Education Funding Council for Wales from 1996 to 2000.

Jones was educated at Cowbridge Grammar School and Jesus College, Oxford – the college appointed him to an Honorary Fellowship in 1990. After serving as a 2nd Lieutenant in the Royal Artillery from 1953 to 1955, he joined the Civil Service in 1955, as Assistant Principal in the Ministry of Supply. He also worked in the Ministry of Aviation, the Treasury and the Department of Trade and Industry, becoming Under-secretary in the DTI in 1974 and serving as Deputy Secretary at the Department of Energy between 1976 and 1983.

He was a member of the British National Oil Corporation from 1980 to 1982 and of the British Overseas Trade Board from 1985 to 1988. He was chairman of the Electricity Council from 1983 to 1990. He was appointed a Companion of the Order of the Bath in 1978, and knighted in 1986.

He was chairman of Total Oil Marine from 1990 to 1998 and of Total Oil Holdings from 1991 to 1998. He was chairman of the Higher Education Funding Council for Wales from 1996 until his death. He was a governor of Henley Management College from 1986 onward.

He was appointed a Freeman of the City of London in 1986, a Fellow of the Royal Society of Arts in 1987 and a Commander of the Order of the Lion of Finland in 1997. He died on 19 July 2000.
