= Tom Reason =

Welsh cricketer

Personal information
- Full name: Thomas Francis Reason
- Born: 4 July 1890; Cadoxton, Glamorgan, Wales
- Died: 15 February 1935 (aged 44); Skewen, Glamorgan, Wales
- Batting: Right-handed
- Bowling: Right-arm medium

Domestic team information
- Years: Team
- 1923: Glamorgan

Career statistics
Competition	FC
Matches	1
Runs scored	13
Batting average	6.50
100s/50s	–/–
Top score	10
Balls bowled	42
Wickets	–
Bowling average	–
5 wickets in innings	–
10 wickets in match	–
Best bowling	–
Catches/stumpings	–/–
- Source: Cricinfo, 29 June 2010

Dr. Thomas Francis Reason (4 July 1890 – 15 February 1935) was a Welsh cricketer. Reason was a right-handed batsman who bowled right-arm medium pace. He was born in Cadoxton, Glamorgan.

Reason made his debut for Glamorgan in the 1914 Minor Counties Championship against Monmouthshire. He played one further match for the county on 1914, before the season was cut short due to the start of the First World War. Following the completion of his medical training at Guy's Hospital and the resumption of county cricket following the war, Reason once again played for Glamorgan. In the 1920 Minor Counties Championship he represented the county in 6 matches, with his final Minor Counties appearance for the county coming against Devon.

Reason made his only first-class appearance for the county in 1923 against Somerset.

Reason died at Skewen, Glamorgan on 15 February 1935.
