= Roger Howells =

Welsh footballer

Personal information
- Full name: Roger William Howells
- Date of birth: 18 September 1931
- Place of birth: Swansea, Wales
- Date of death: 1975 (aged 43–44)
- Place of death: Llanelli, Wales
- Position: Centre forward

Senior career*
Years	Team	Apps	(Gls)
–	Llanelly		
1950–1953	Swansea Town	0	(0)
1953–1954	Darlington	2	(0)
1954–195?	Swansea Town	0	(0)
- * Club domestic league appearances and goals

Roger William Howells (18 September 1931 – 1975) was a Welsh footballer who played as a centre forward in the Football League for Darlington and in non-league football for Llanelly. Either side of his spell with Darlington, he was on the books of Swansea Town without playing for them in the League. Howells played twice for Darlington's first team, both appearances coming in the Third Division North: in the last match of the 1953–54 Football League season, a 2–0 defeat at home to Halifax Town, and in September 1953, a 1–1 draw at home to Barnsley.
