= Bethania Chapel, Abercynon =

Former chapel in Abercynon, Rhondda Cynon Taf, Wales

Coordinates: 51.6477°N 3.3294°W

Bethania, Abercynon
- Bethania, Abercynon
- Location: Mountain Ash Road, Abercynon
- Country: Wales
- Denomination: Independent (Congregationalist)

Architecture
- Architectural type: Chapel
- Style: Late 19th century
- Completed: 1893
- Closed: c. 1978

Specifications
- Capacity: 700

Bethania, Abercynon was an Independent chapel in Mountain Ash Road, Abercynon, Glamorgan, Wales. Services at Bethania were conducted in the Welsh language.

== Early history ==
The church began in the form of a Sunday School and other informal meetings being held in houses in the community. The first chapel was built in 1893 but within a short time proved too small, As a result, a new chapel was built in 1898 at a cost of £3,500 with seating for 700. The first minister was J. J. Williams, later Archdruid of Wales.

== Ministry of W. Caradog Jones ==
Caradog Jones came to Abercynon from Oswestry in 1897. He left in 1903 after some disagreements at the chapel.

== 20th century ==
In 1910, Rev. J. T. Ll. Williams of Ebenezer, Cefncoed, Merthyr, accepted a call to minister at Bethania, as successor to D. Bryniog Thomas who had moved to Seion, Maesteg. At the induction services, Evan Jones, the senior deacon at Bethania, reflected that the decision to call upon the services of the new minister had been agreed to be the congregation without any dissension.

A number of members left in the early days to form Mount Zion English Baptist Chapel. The chapel closed in the 1970s and was demolished in 1990. The site was redeveloped in 1991 with flats named Bethania.

== Bibliography ==
- Jones, Alan Vernon (2004). Chapels of the Cynon Valley. Cynon Valley Historical Society. ISBN 0953107612.
