= Trebor Edwards =

Welsh singer (born 1939)

Trebor Edwards (born 1939) is a Welsh tenor, best known to Welsh-speaking audiences.

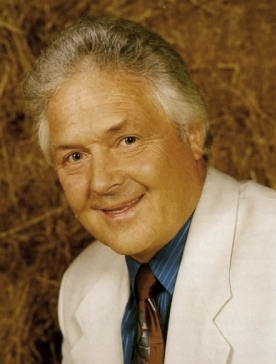

Edwards was born in Denbigh and became a farmer at Corwen before beginning his recording career in 1974. He has won five gold discs and sold over 200,000 records - huge success for a Welsh language performer. He is now the president of the Royal Welsh Agricultural Show (2008).

== Discography ==
=== Singles ===
- Ave Maria (7" EP, TAG 245, 1973)
- Duw Ŵyr (7" EP, TAG 249, 1974)
- Un Dydd Ar Y Tro (7" single, SAIN 90S, 1981)

=== Albums ===
- Dyma Fy Nghân (LP/cassette, 1976)
- Cân Y Bugail (LP/cassette, 1978)
- Presenting Trebor Edwards (LP/cassette, 1978)
- Un Dydd Ar Y Tro (LP/cassette, 1980)
- Ychydig Hedd (LP, 1982)
- Gwelaf Dy Wên (LP/cassette, 1984)
- Diolch (LP/cassette, 1986)
- Goreuon (LP/CD, 1988)
- Edrych Ymlaen (LP/cassette, 1990)
- Ceidwad Byd (LP/CD, 1993)
- Ffefrynnau Newydd (CD/cassette, 1998)
- The Very Best of Trebor Edwards (CD, 1997)
- Trebor Ar Ei Orau (CD, 2007)
- Sicrwydd Bendigaid (CD, 2008)
