= Ivor Bowen =

Ivor Bowen (1862 - 1934) was a Welsh lawyer, County Court judge and author.

Born in Glamorganshire, South Wales, Bowen was the son of J. Bowen Jones, an independent minister. Whilst still a young man, Bowen moved to London and worked for a bank.

In 1886, Bowen became a student of Gray's Inn and 1889 was called to the Bar. He is known to have practiced law in the Cardiff area as a revising barrister between 1905 and 1912. His other positions included: Recorder of Merthyr Tydfil (1914–15), Recorder of Swansea (1915–18), County Court Judge (Mid Wales Circuit) (1918–33), and Treasurer of Gray's Inn (1923).

Bowen's published writings include: The Statutes of Wales (1908), and The Great Enclosures of Common Lands in Wales (1914).

Bowen died in 1934.
