= Glyn Hughes (footballer) =

Welsh footballer

Personal information
- Full name: Thomas Glynfor Hughes
- Date of birth: 29 November 1931
- Place of birth: Coedpoeth, Wales
- Date of death: 19 August 1995 (aged 63)
- Place of death: Southsea, Hampshire, England
- Position: Winger

Senior career*
| Years | Team | Apps | (Gls) |
- Llay Welfare
| 1951–1952 | Sheffield Wednesday | 0 | (0) |
| 1952–1955 | Wrexham | 92 | (20) |
| 1955–1956 | Newport County | 4 | (0) |
- Caernarfon Town
- * Club domestic league appearances and goals

Thomas Glynfor Hughes (29 November 1931 – 19 August 1995) was a Welsh professional footballer, who played as a winger. He made appearances in the English football league in the 1950s for Welsh clubs Wrexham and Newport County.
