= Gwyn Thomas (sportsman) =

Welsh sportsman (1891–1932)

John Leslie Gwyn Thomas (14 March 1891 – 10 April 1932) was a Welsh sportsman who played both rugby and cricket at domestic level.

== Biography ==
Born 14 March 1891, in Neath, Thomas played both sports for Neath while attending grammar school, his cricket skill commended on account of his bold striking of the ball and free scoring, possessing enough power to lift the ball out of the cricket ground. He became a regular team member in Glamorgan's Minor Counties fixtures between 1910 and 1920, before finally getting his chance at first-class cricket in 1922, when other batsmen became unavailable, before being interrupted in his quest for further possible play by his business commitments.

Thomas played rugby union for Neath RFC, captaining the team during the 1920–21 season. He also played for Barbarian F.C. between 1912 and 1920.

Thomas died on 10 April 1932, aged 41, in Neath.
