= Danny Harris (rugby) =

Wales international rugby union & league footballer

Daniel John Edward Harris
Personal information
- Full name: Daniel John Edward Harris
- Born: 27 May 1937 (age 89) Penygraig, Wales

Playing information

Rugby union
- Position: Lock
Club
Years	Team	Pld	T	G	FG	P
1955–59	Pontypridd RFC	29
1959–61	Cardiff RFC	51
	Total	80	0	0	0	0
Representative
Years	Team	Pld	T	G	FG	P
1959–61	Wales	8	0	0	0	0

Rugby league
Club
Years	Team	Pld	T	G	FG	P
≥1961–≥61	Leigh
- Source: scrum.com

Daniel John Edward Harris (27 May 1937) born in Penygraig, is a Welsh former rugby union, and professional rugby league footballer who played in the 1950s and 1960s. He played representative level rugby union (RU) for Wales, and at club level for Pontypridd RFC and Cardiff RFC, playing at lock, and club level rugby league (RL) for Leigh.

== International honours ==
Danny Harris won caps for Wales (RU) while at Pontypridd RFC in 1959 against Ireland, and France, while at Cardiff RFC in 1960 against Scotland, Ireland, France, and South Africa, and in 1961 against England, and Scotland.
