= Howard Morgan (cricketer) =

Welsh cricketer (1931–2019)

Personal information
- Full name: Howard William Morgan
- Born: 29 June 1931; Maesteg, Glamorgan, Wales
- Died: 16 March 2019 (aged 87)
- Batting: Right-handed
- Bowling: Right-arm off break

Domestic team information
- Years: Team
- 1958: Glamorgan

Career statistics
| Competition | FC |
|---|---|
| Matches | 2 |
| Runs scored | 11 |
| Batting average | 5.50 |
| 100s/50s | –/– |
| Top score | 5 |
| Balls bowled | 132 |
| Wickets | 2 |
| Bowling average | 29.00 |
| 5 wickets in innings | – |
| 10 wickets in match | – |
| Best bowling | 1/27 |
| Catches/stumpings | –/– |
- Source: Cricinfo, 5 July 2010

Howard William Morgan (29 June 1931 – 16 March 2019) was a Welsh cricketer. Morgan was a right-handed batsman who bowled right-arm off break. He was born at Maesteg, Glamorgan.

Morgan played 2 first-class matches Glamorgan in 1958 against Leicestershire and Warwickshire. In his 2 first-class matches, he took 2 wickets at a bowling average of 29.00, with best figures of 1/27. With the bat he scored 11 runs batting average of 5.50, with a high score of 5.

After leaving Glamorgan at the end of the 1958 season, he became a schoolmaster in Cardiff, as well as a selector for the Welsh Schools Under-19 team.
