= Dai Davies (journalist) =

Dai Davies (David Davies; 22 October 1938 – 19 May 2008) was an English-born Welsh sports journalist, best known as golf correspondent of The Guardian.

He was born in Crewe, the son of sports journalist Rod Davies and his wife Peggy. Rod Davies worked on the Birmingham Evening Mail and his family came from Swansea, hence Dai chose to be called Welsh. While his father was serving in the Second World War, he and his mother lived in Blackpool. After the war, he attended King Edward's School, Aston, Birmingham. He did his national service in Singapore as a member of the Royal Army Ordnance Corps. Rather than attend university, he began an apprenticeship in journalism.

In his spare time, Davies played rugby for Sutton Coldfield RFC, and remained associated with the club, continuing to live in Sutton Coldfield until his death. He was also a jazz enthusiast who occasionally wrote for Keyboard magazine. He worked for a news agency, moving on to BBC Midlands, and in 1965 became golf correspondent of the Birmingham Post, where his father was also working.

In 1982 he joined The Guardian, writing under the name "David Davies" until he became established. He remained with the paper for over twenty years, retiring in 2004. He also worked on The Observer.

In 1983 he married Patricia, who was a successful amateur golfer and a golf writer. Together they would write Teach Yourself Golf and Beyond the Fairways (1999). They had no children.

He died in hospital of oesophagogastric cancer, aged 69.
