= Norman Rees (journalist) =

- Born: Norman Charles Rees; 2 March 1939; Splott, Cardiff, Wales
- Died: 14 June 2023 (aged 84); Reading, Berkshire, England
- Occupation: Television journalist
- Years active: 1956–1999
- Spouse: Andrea (m. 1961; death 2023)
- Children: 2

Norman Charles Rees (2 March 1939 – 14 June 2023) was a Welsh television journalist. He began his career as a junior reporter for the Western Mail newspaper, remaining there for seven years before moving into television with Television Wales and the West, later Harlech Television. Rees joined Independent Television News (ITN) in London as a news editor in 1967, switching to reporting in 1972 and became ITN's Washington correspondent in 1977. He returned to London in 1981 and was appointed ITN's chief assistant editor three years later. Rees returned to reporting in 1991 and retired in 1999.

== Early life ==
Rees was born on 2 March 1939 in Splott, Cardiff, Wales. He was the son of the newspaper packer Daniel Rees and his wife Maisel (née Fish). Rees attended Cantonian High School.

== Career ==
At the age of 18, he began his career in journalism as a junior reporter for the Western Mail newspaper in 1956. Following seven years working at the publication, Rees moved into television in 1963 with the ITV Wales and West franchise Television Wales and the West (TWW). He was retained when TWW lost the franchise to Harlech Television (HTV). There, Rees worked as a reporter, scriptwriter and news editor. From HTV, he began working as a news editor for Independent Television News (ITN) in London in 1968. In 1972, Rees switched to reporting, covering Northern Ireland and the Cod War fishing dispute – from aboard an Icelandic gunboat and obtained exclusive footage of British war ships departing the fishing area limits. He also reported on the Yom Kippur War in 1973, the October 1974 United Kingdom general election, the Watergate scandal in 1974, eliciting the following response from President Richard Nixon "I screwed it up and paid the price", and the sieges of South Moluccan gunmen in the Netherlands.

In July 1977, Rees was appointed as ITN's Washington correspondent, succeeding Michael Brunson, having stood in for Brunson on two separate occasions. He covered the 1980 United States presidential election from New York, the murder of John Lennon in New York in 1980, the attempted assassination of Ronald Reagan in 1981 and the maiden launch of the Space Shuttle Columbia. That same year, Rees returned to London as a reporter. In October 1981, he and his television crew were deported from Uganda after informing the country's President Milton Obote of a massacre of villagers carried out by government troops in a village outside Kampala. In 1982, Rees covered the Falklands War for three months from the Argentine capital of Buenos Aires. He elicited public reaction to the Sinking of ARA General Belgrano.

Rees also spent time in the Middle East, doing dispatches from Lebanon in 1983 during which the Palestinian leader Yasser Arafat was based in the country and rival Palestine Liberation Organization (PLO) factions were battled each other – with children caught in the crossfire. He was based in Tel Aviv when Lebanon was invaded by Israel the year before and witnessed the withdrawal of the PLO from Beirut. In 1984, Rees was appointed ITN's chief assistant editor and read the news on television during the occasional early morning and weekend. He accompanied several royal tours over the years, including the 1989 tour of the Far East by Princess Diana in which she visited a leprosy unit in Indonesia and shook the hands of patients. Rees returned to reporting in 1991 and did in-depth special reports for the News at Ten bulletin, such as the Dunblane massacre. He broadcast a seven-minute piece detailing some of the highlights of News at Ten's history for the last bulletin of the original iteration of the programme in 1999, the year in which he retired. Rees was editor of the membership magazine of the Reading Male Voice Choir, of which he was a member.

== Personal life ==
He married his wife Andrea in 1961. They had two children. In October 1982, Rees was fined £100 for drink-driving in the West End of London. His house was twice burgled, first in October 1991 and again in February 1995. Rees died at the Royal Berkshire Hospital, Reading on 14 June 2023 after a brief illness.
