= Y Genedl Gymreig =

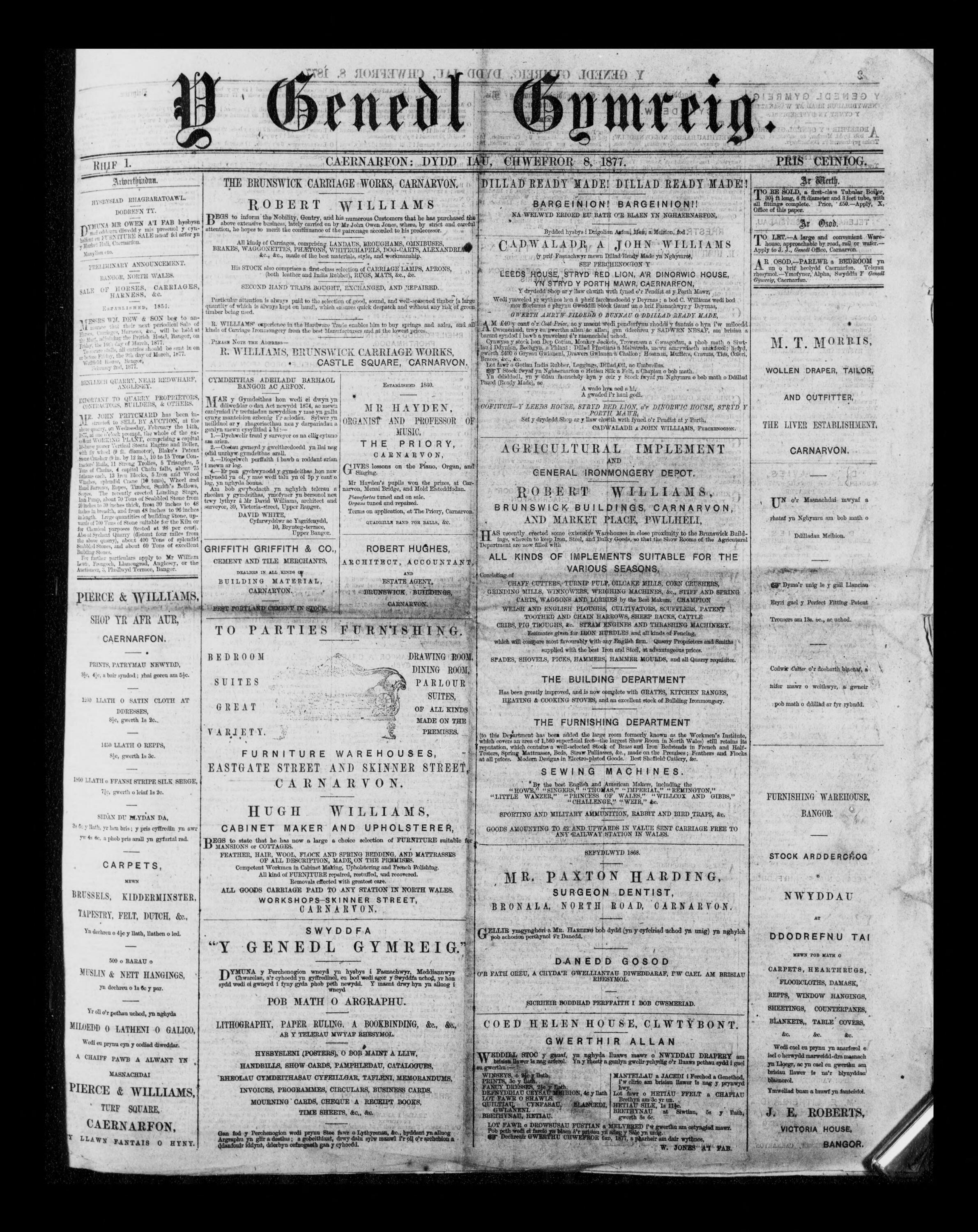
- Type: Weekly newspaper
- Headquarters: Caernarfon

Y Genedl Cymreig (established in 1877) was a weekly Welsh language newspaper containing general news and information. It was published by Thomas Jones.
