= Hugh Evans (writer) =

Welsh author and publisher (1854–1934)

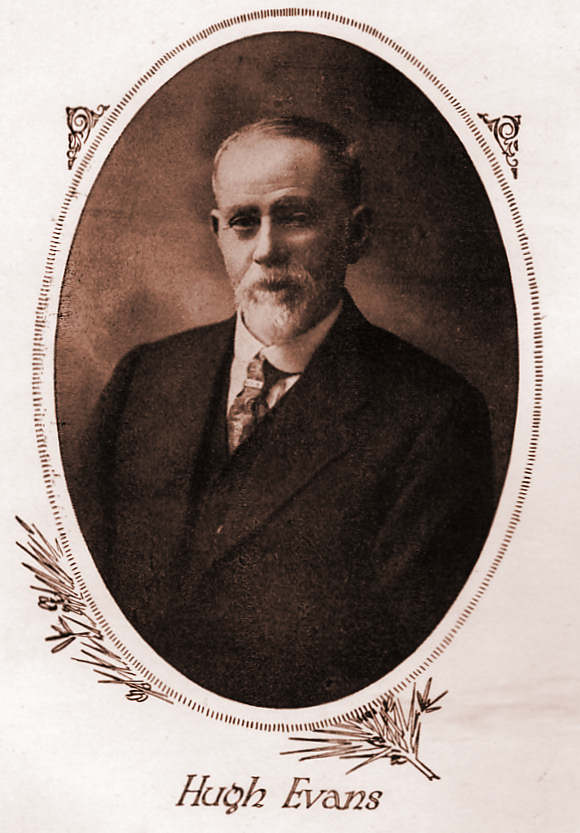
Hugh Evans

Hugh Evans (14 September 1854 – 30 June 1934) was a Welsh publisher and author. He founded the Gwasg y Brython press and was the author of many books and articles about life in rural Wales and Welsh folklore, as well as a series of books for children.

Evans was a native of the small village of Llangwm, then in Denbighshire, now in Conwy. He attended elementary school before going to work as a farm labourer in his locality. He moved to Liverpool in 1875 where he founded the Gwasg y Brython Press, which became one of the major Welsh publishers of the day.

Evans had wide interests as a writer and archaeologist. He founded the antiquarian magazine Y Brython in 1906 and in 1911 began to publish an influential critical magazine Y Beirniad, edited by Sir John Morris-Jones. He wrote a book on folk tales about fairies in 1935. He wrote a series of stories and other books for children as well, including Hogyn y Bwthyn Bach To Gwellt. However, he is chiefly remembered for his classic Cwm Eithin (Gorse Glen) (1931), which portrays the memorable customs and society of rural Wales, largely based on his knowledge of his native area.

== Bibliography ==
=== Books by Hugh Evans ===
- Camau'r Cysegr (Liverpool, 1926)
- Cwm Eithin (Liverpool, 1931). Translated into English under the title Gorse Glen (1948)
- Hogyn y Bwthyn Bach To Gwellt (Liverpool, 1935)
- Y Tylwyth Teg (Liverpool in 1935; several editions thereafter)

=== Studies ===
- Richard Huws, "Hugh Evans", in Dewiniaid Difyr, ed. Mairwen and Gwynn Jones (Gomer Press, 1983)
