= Edward Maes Llaned Owen =

Edward Owen
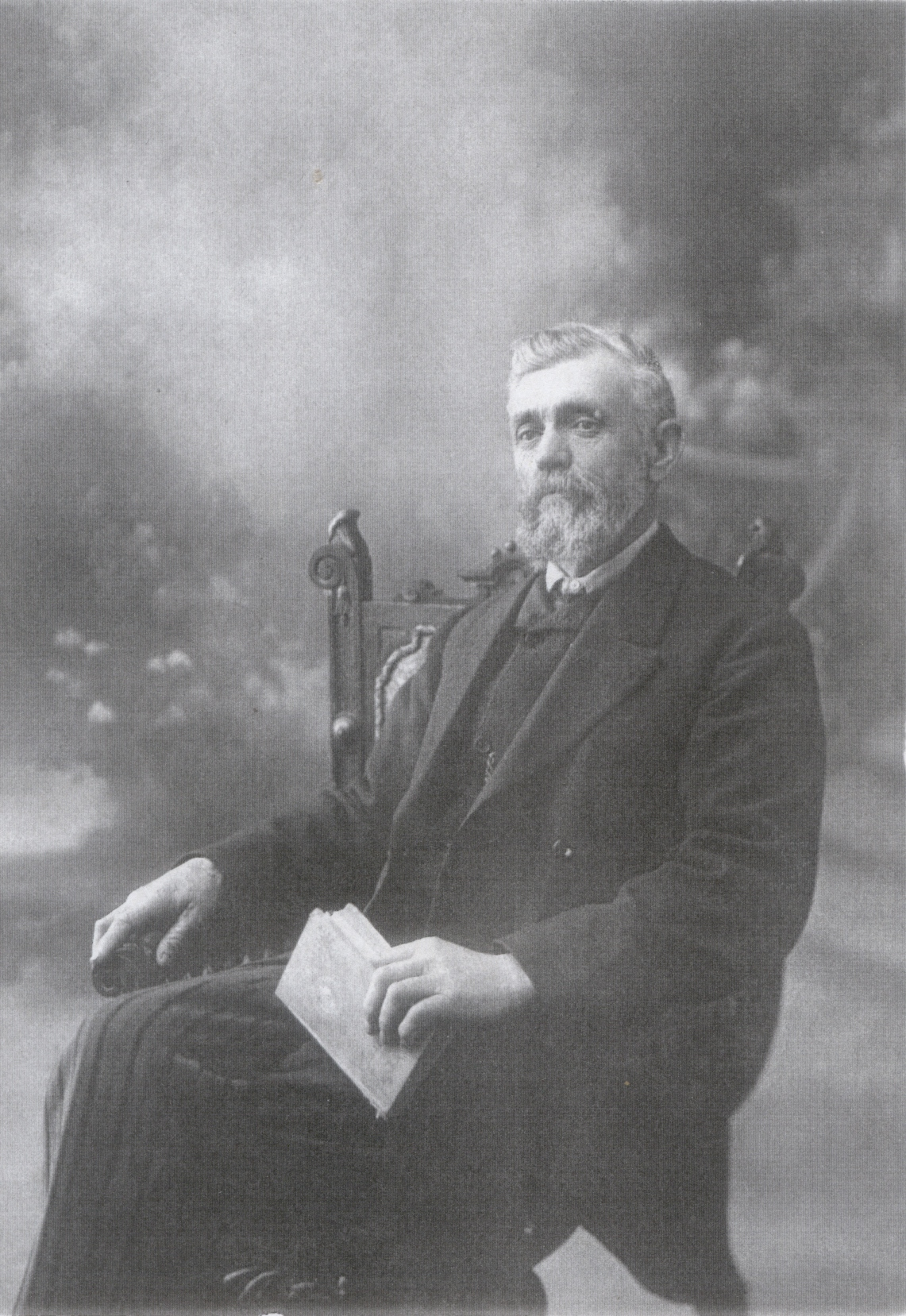
- Edward Owen, Welsh pioneer in the Argentine Patagonia
- Born: 6 February 1846; Llandderfel, Merionethshire, Wales
- Died: 29 October 1931 (aged 85); Chubut, Argentina
- Spouse(s): Elizabeth Jones (1876–1889); Mary Rogers (1890–1931)
- Children: Six with Elizabeth (Catherine Jane, Liza, Nell, David, Owen and Mary Ellen), six with Mary (Martha, Susanah, Blodwen, Winiffred, William and Bertha)

Edward Owen, also known as Edward Owen,"Maes Llaned" (6 February 1846 – 29 October 1931) was a Welsh engineer, surveyor and merchant who was chairman of the Chubut City Council three times and a pioneer of Welsh colonization in the lower valley of the Chubut River and on the island of Choele Choel, in the province of Río Negro, Argentina.

== Biography ==
He was born on 6 February 1846 at Ty Uchaf Farm, Llandderfel, near the town of Bala, Merionethshire, Wales. His father was Owen Owens, tenant of the farm, and his wife Mary Jones, who had two more sons, and three daughters.

Edward Owen left for Patagonia on 20 April 1874 from Liverpool, on the Hipparchus ship along with other 49 Welsh passengers originating from different parts of Wales, including Aberdare, Cardigan, Ruthin and Ffestiniog. Arriving in Chubut in Patagonia, as most immigrant farmers, they were transferred 100 hectares of land in the area of Drofa Dulog in the lower Chubut River valley between the villages of Gaiman and Trelew.

== See also ==
- Y Wladfa
