= Gwilym R. Jones =

Gwilym Richard Jones (24 March 1903 – 29 July 1993) was an editor and poet, and the first person to have received all three major literary awards at the National Eisteddfod of Wales. The Eisteddfod is an event at which it is notoriously difficult to achieve an award without merit, as the judges will often attribute no prize if they feel that the quality of the work submitted does not meet the standards required. Jones was awarded the Bardic Crown in 1935, the Chair in 1938, and the Prose Medal in 1941.

Raised in Talysarn, Jones embarked upon a career in journalism at Caernarfon where he wrote for Yr Herald Cymraeg., then he moved to Liverpool in 1931 to edit the weekly Brython which he did until 1939. Controversially in 1942 he became the editor of Baner ac Amserau Cymru, a paper which openly supported the activities of Plaid Cymru and had Saunders Lewis as one of its chief columnists as well as in the 1960s supporting Cymdeithas yr Iaith Gymraeg Jones remained as editor for 38 years. At Denbigh he immersed himself in the life of the Welsh community, and in particular the Capel Mawr Presbyterian Church of Wales where he came to admire the socialist minister, Rev J. H. Griffith.
