= James Kitchener Davies =

British writer and politician (1902–1952)

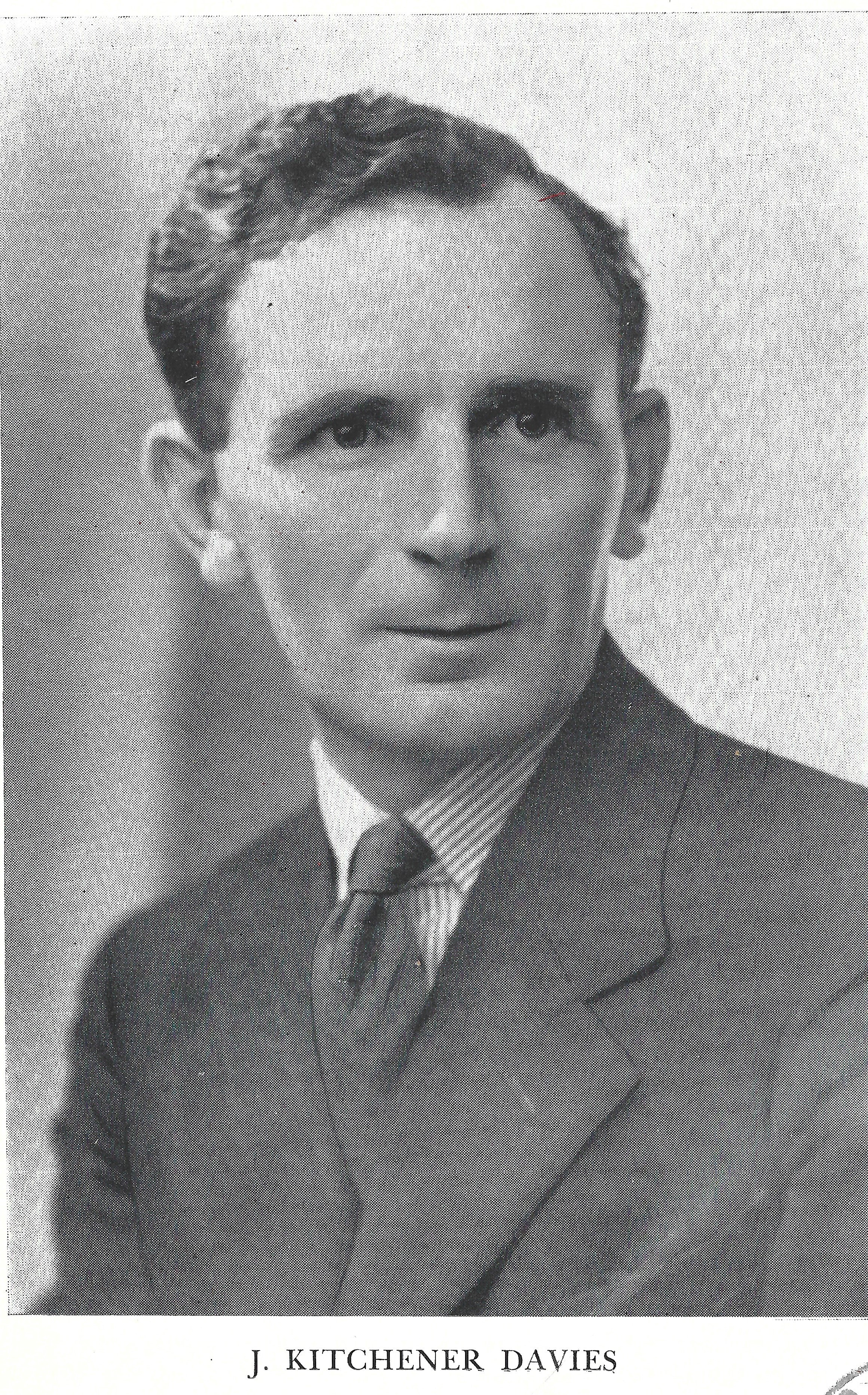
- Born: 16 June 1902; Tregaron, Ceredigion
- Died: 25 August 1952 (aged 50)
- Resting place: Llether Ddu, Trealaw
- Occupations: Poet and playwright

James Kitchener Davies (16 June 1902 – 25 August 1952), also known as J. Kitchener Davies, was a Welsh poet and playwright who wrote mostly in the Welsh language. Davies's work is highly influenced by the industrial landscape of his adopted village of Trealaw in the Rhondda Valley and his own nationalistic beliefs.

== Biography ==
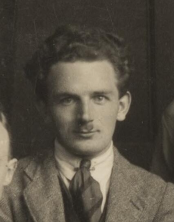
James Kitchener Davies in the Aberystwyth Students Union Committee circa 1925

Born and brought up in Llangeitho in Ceredigion, Davies spent his working life in the newly industrialised coalfields of the Rhondda Valley. The sometimes bleak conditions of his early life, especially as his early adulthood coincided with the economic despair of the depression, is reflected in his plays. Davies was part of the Cadwgan Circle, a literary group of likeminded writers from Rhondda, that centred their image of Wales on the new industrialised society they were brought up in. Members of the Circle included Rhydwen Williams, Pennar Davies and Gareth Alban Davies.

His early play Cwm Glo (1934) was seen as controversial because it dealt with the social impact of the depression without the cultural romanticism which was stereotypical of Welsh literature. His verse play Meini Gwagedd (1944) is set in the Tregaron area and again looks at the harshness of the industrialised Wales and the self-destructive nature of people when drawn into a spiral of ill fortune.

In 1945, Davies stood in the United Kingdom general election, standing in the Rhondda East constituency as the first member of Plaid Cymru to contest the seat in the Rhondda Valleys. He came last out of three candidates, gaining 2,123 votes (6.1%). The next election, in 1950 he ran again, this time the Rhondda West constituency seat. He increased his vote to 6.6% and then improved this in the 1951 election when he polled slightly higher with 7.7% of the vote, again in the Rhondda West constituency.

James Kitchener Davies is buried at Trealaw Cemetery in Trealaw.

== Bibliography ==
- Williams, Chris (1996). Democratic Rhondda, Politics and society 1885-1951. Cardiff: University of Wales Press. p. 164. ISBN 0-7083-1334-5.
