= John James Williams (poet) =

Welsh poet

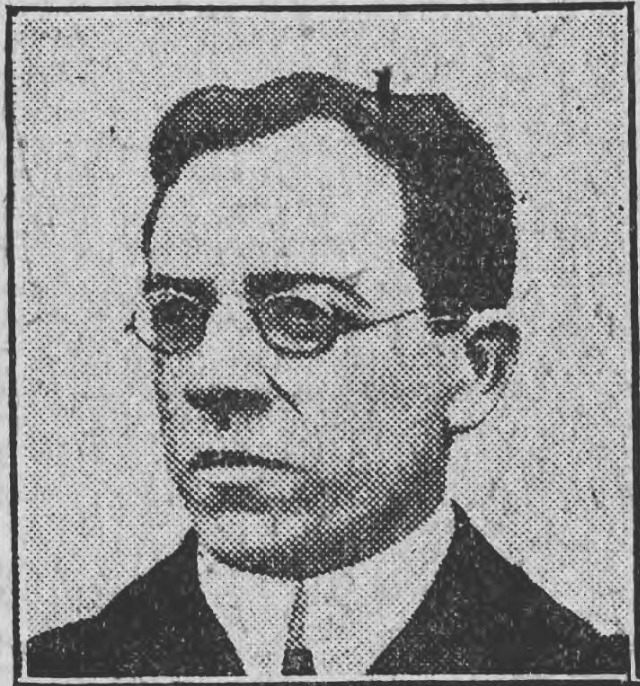

John James Williams (8 October 1869 – 6 May 1954), commonly known by his bardic name of "J.J.", was a Welsh poet and served as Archdruid of the National Eisteddfod of Wales from 1936 to 1939.

== Early life ==
Williams was born in Taigwynion, near Tal-y-bont, Cardiganshire. He was the eldest of twelve children born to William and Elizabeth Williams. As was fairly usual in that era the parents attended different nonconformist chapels. His mother was a member at Pen-y-Garn, the Calvinistic Methodist church at Rhydypennau while his father attended Bethel Independent church at Tal-y-bont. William Williams was a lead miner and due to lack of work in the local industry he went to work for some time in 1879–80 at the collieries in Mountain Ash. In 1882 the whole family settled in Penrhiwceibr in the Aberdare valley where they became members at Carmel chapel. Shortly afterwards they moved to Ynysybwl and joined Tabernacle, where the young Williams began preaching while working as a miner.

== Education ==
Williams had received his elementary education at Pwllglas Sunday School and at Rhydypennau School in his native Cardiganshire, but left at an early age. While working underground he was accepted as a student to prepare for the nonconformist ministry, and attended Pontypridd Academy which was run by E. Dunmore Edwards. In 1891, he was accepted as a student at the Memorial College, Brecon and spent the first years of study at University College, Cardiff, where he excelled in his studies of Welsh language and literature.

== Early career as a minister ==
Williams was ordained at Bethania, Abercynon, on 22 July 1895. In 1897, he moved to Moriah, Rhymney. After six years in Rhymney he moved to Seilo, Pentre, Rhondda, where he succeeded Lewis Probert.

== Ministry at Tabernacle, Morriston ==
From 1915 until 1944 he was minister of Tabernacle Chapel, Morriston, and one of the most popular preachers of the era. Williams was elected chairman of the Union of Welsh Independents in 1935 .

== Literary career ==
While a miner in Ynysybwl, Williams began to earn a reputation as a poet, and, in 1889, the eisteddfod at Jerusalem, Ynysybwl, saw the young poet come to public notice for the first time.

In the early years of the twentieth century, he began to compete at the National Eisteddfod and won the most prestigious prize, the bardic chair, on two occasions. The first was at Caernarfon in 1906 for an Awdl (a poem in strict verse) on Y Lloer (The Moon). This poem became popular because of its smooth, rhythmical lines. He won for a second time at Llangollen two years later for a poem in memory of the popular nineteenth century Welsh poet, John Ceiriog Hughes (Ceiriog). His collected poems appeared in 1936 as Y Lloer a cherddi eraill. He wrote a number of plays as well as a collection of short stories, Straeon y Gilfach Ddu, published in 1931. These were written in the Glamorgan dialect and portrayed the mining communities.

Williams was a prolific writer of hymns and one of the editors of the hymns of Caniedydd Cynulleidfaol Newydd, the standard Welsh language hymn book for the Independent and Calvinistic Methodist denominations, which was published in 1921. In 1918, he edited Cerddi'r Bugail, the collected poems of Hedd Wyn who had been killed in France in 1917. In 1930, he received an honorary MA from the University of Wales in recognition of his literary activity.

== Personal life ==
In 1899, Williams married Claudia Bevan of Mountain Ash. She died at childbirth and their son died before he was two years old. In 1903 he married Abigail Jenkins of Pontlotyn, who died on 24 June 1936. Williams himself died on 6 May 1954.

Preceded by John Jenkins (Gwili)	Archdruid of the National Eisteddfod of Wales; 1936–1939	Succeeded by William Williams (Crwys)
