= Margiad Evans =

English poet, novelist and illustrator

Margiad Evans was the pseudonym of Peggy Eileen Whistler (17 March 1909 – 17 March 1958), an English poet, novelist and illustrator with a lifelong identification with the Welsh border country.

== Life and works ==
Evans was born Peggy Whistler in Uxbridge, Middlesex, the daughter of Godfrey James Whistler (1866–1936), an insurance clerk. Her affection for the Herefordshire countryside grew from visits she began to pay in 1918 to an aunt in Ross-on-Wye. The family moved to nearby Bridstow in 1921. She was educated in Ross and at Hereford School of Art.

She took her pen name from her father's mother, whose name was Evans. Her two most famous works are Country Dance (1932) and her Autobiography (1943, 2nd edn, 1952). Country Dance (serialized on BBC radio in 2006) was followed by three further novels, The Wooden Doctor (1933), Turf or Stone (1934), and Creed (1936), all set in the countryside of the Welsh Marches. Some of her books were self-illustrated.

Whistler married George Michael Mendus Williams, a Welshman, on 28 October 1940, and they went to live on a farm at Llangarron, near Ross, where her husband worked. There a fifth novel was abandoned in favour of her autobiography. She also published Poems from Obscurity (1947) and a volume of stories, The Old and the Young (1948), written while her husband was serving in the army. They moved in 1950 to Elkstone near Gloucester, where her husband was training to be a teacher. Her discovery that she was epileptic led to another autobiographical account, A Ray of Darkness (1952).

The couple moved in 1953 with their daughter Cassandra (born 1951) to Hartfield in Sussex, where her husband began teaching. However, Evans's health declined and she suffered from homesickness for the Welsh marches. The Nightingale Silenced (1954) is a moving account of her life after she was diagnosed with a brain tumour. A second volume of poetry, A Candle Ahead (1956), won a prize from the Welsh committee of the Arts Council a few weeks before she died on 17 March 1958 in Tunbridge Wells, Kent.

Interest in Margiad Evans' work has revived, especially in Wales. There were new editions of The Old and the Young in 1998, of Country Dance and The Wooden Doctor in 2005, and of Turf or Stone in 2010. A centenary conference took place in Aberystwyth in 2009.

== Publications ==
- Turf or Stone. Foreword: Deborah Kay Davies, Library of Wales/Parthian Books, 2011
- The Wooden Doctor. Introduction: Sue Asbee, Honno Press, 2005
- Country Dance. Foreword: Catrin Collier, Library of Wales/Parthian Books, 2005
- The Old and the Young (stories), Seren (Bridgend), reprinted 1998
- A Ray of Darkness (autobiography), J. Calder, 1978
- Autobiography, Calder Publications Ltd, reprinted 1974
- A Candle Ahead (poetry), Chatto & Windus, 1956
- The Nightingale Silenced (autobiography: brain tumour), 1954
- Poems from Obscurity, Andrew Dakers, 1947
- Creed. A Novel, Basil Blackwell, 1936, republished with an introduction by Sue Asbee, Honno Press, Aberystwyth, 2018
