= John Jenkins (Gwili) =

Welsh poet and theologian (1872–1936)

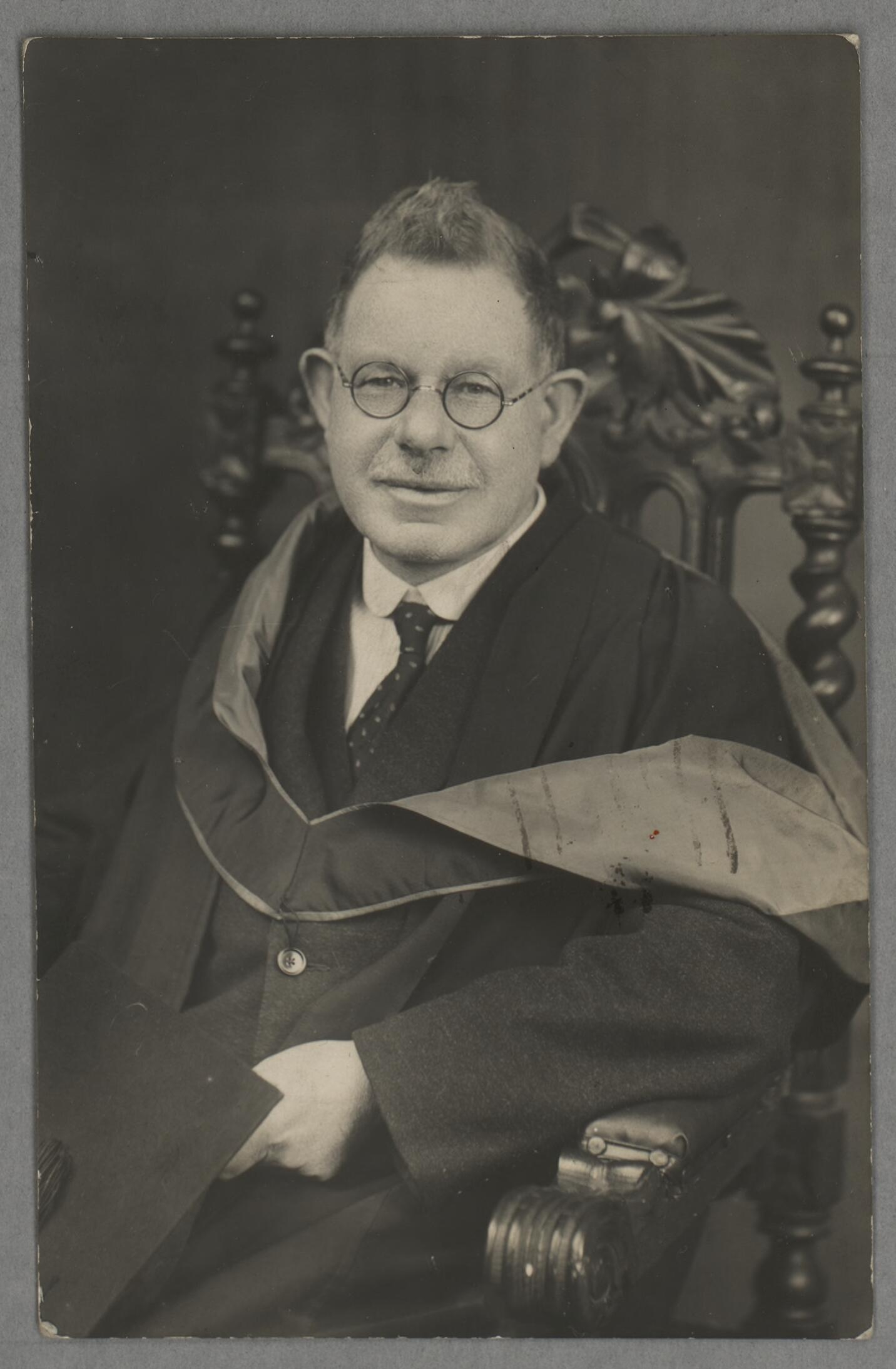
John Jenkins (Gwili)

John Jenkins (8 October 1872 – 16 May 1936) was a Welsh poet and theologian. Known by his bardic name of Gwili, he served as Archdruid of the National Eisteddfod of Wales from 1932 to 1936.

== Early life and education ==
Gwili was born at Hendy in Carmarthenshire, the fifth child of John Jenkins, a metal refiner, and his wife Elizabeth. His parents were fervent Baptists and he received much of his primary education in the Baptist Sunday School movement. He attended Hendy Primary School, where he served also as a pupil teacher in 1885–1890.

In the late 19th and early 20th century in England and Wales, a promising 13-year-old could stay on at school as a probationer to help with teaching younger pupils. After two years, another three years would be spent learning the profession before taking a final exam, to be paid for at training college to become a qualified teacher, although Gwili did not become one.

In 1891 Gwili became a pupil at the Athenaeum School in Llanelli, but stayed for only one term, as it then closed. He moved on to the Gwynfryn School in Ammanford for a year, studying Greek and Latin, before moving to the Baptists' Theological College in Bangor. There he studied for the external intermediate examination of the University of London, which he failed in 1896, probably because he had spent too much of his time on poetic and literary pursuits. The failure precluded him at that time from being accepted into the Baptist ministry.

In October 1896 Gwili enrolled on a course at the University of Wales, Cardiff, but withdrew in March 1897. In 1905, aged 33, Gwili entered Jesus College, Oxford as a student of Greats, i. e. Latin, Greek, Ancient Philosophy and History, and passed the first-year examinations. However, he changed his course and instead obtained a second-class honours degree in theology in 1908. University regulations at the time would have awarded him an automatic MA degree after seven years (1915).

In 1918 Gwili wrote a thesis on "The Study of the Gospels in Mediaeval Welsh", for which he obtained an Oxford University B.Litt.. He also received an honorary degree of D.Litt. in 1932.

== Professional life ==
Though an ordained minister, Gwili never took up pastoral duties, spending most of his working life in teaching roles. Between his studies in Cardiff and Oxford, he worked as assistant master at Gwynfryn School Ammanford, to which he returned as head after graduating from Oxford. The school closed during the First World War. In 1917, Gwili was appointed as lecturer in Welsh in the Department of Celtic Studies at Cardiff University, spending some months as acting professor whilst Professor W. J. Gruffydd was on active service in the Royal Navy. In 1919 he became Librarian of the Salisbury Library at Cardiff University. In 1923 he was appointed Professor of New Testament Exegesis at the Baptist College and University of North Wales Bangor, where he remained until his retirement.

Gwili spent two periods as editor of the Baptist periodical Seren Cymru. His first stint was in 1914–1927, when he used the paper to promote the works of the Fabian Society and the Independent Labour Party, giving the paper "an importance that no other denominational publication attained in later times". The paper went into decline after Gwili's departure. He was invited back as editor in an attempt to revive its fortunes in 1933 and remained such until his death. He was also the editor of the Baptist periodical Seren Gomer in 1930–1933.

== The poet ==
Gwili had a poem published in the Llanelly and County Guardian in 1887, when he was 14 years old. He competed in regional and local bardic competitions throughout Wales with a fair degree of success, winning competitions in Llanelli and Cwrt Henri and in places as far as Dolgellau, Corwen and Caernarfon. He was not so successful on a national level, trying but failing to win a major prize on at least seven occasions before gaining the Crown at the Merthyr Tydfil National Eisteddfod in 1901 for his poem "Tywysog Tangnefedd" (Prince of Peace).

Gwili had a knowledge of cynghanedd the strict metre of Welsh poetry, but never had much success in it. All his provincial eisteddfod honours were for poems in free metre. However, he adjudicated a competition for the chair (offered for a poem in Cynghanedd) on at least two occasions. He was elected Archdruid in 1931 and served a term from 1932 until his death in 1936.

== Personal life ==
In 1910 Gwili married Mary E Lewis of Ammanford, by whom he had two daughters: Nest born in 1912 and Gwen born in 1914.

Gwili died on 16 May 1936. The children of Hendy were given a half-day holiday to line the streets before his funeral at Hen Gapel, Llanedi, where he was buried on 19 May. Over 700 letters and telegrams of condolence were sent to the family.

== Works ==
- Poems (1920)
- Arweiniad i'r Testament Newydd (1929)
- Hanfod Duw a Pherson Crist (1931)
- Caniadau (1934)

Preceded by John Owen Williams (Pedrog)	Archdruid of the National Eisteddfod of Wales; 1932–1936	Succeeded by John James Williams (J.J.)
