= 1870 in Wales =

- Centuries: 17th; 18th; 19th; 20th; 21st
- Decades: 1850s; 1860s; 1870s; 1880s; 1890s
- See also: List of years in Wales; Timeline of Welsh history 1870 in The United Kingdom Scotland Elsewhere

This article is about the particular significance of the year 1870 to Wales and its people.

== Incumbents ==
- Lord Lieutenant of Anglesey – William Owen Stanley
- Lord Lieutenant of Brecknockshire – Charles Morgan, 1st Baron Tredegar
- Lord Lieutenant of Caernarvonshire – Edward Douglas-Pennant, 1st Baron Penrhyn
- Lord Lieutenant of Cardiganshire – Edward Pryse
- Lord Lieutenant of Carmarthenshire – John Campbell, 2nd Earl Cawdor
- Lord Lieutenant of Denbighshire – Robert Myddelton Biddulph
- Lord Lieutenant of Flintshire – Sir Stephen Glynne, 9th Baronet
- Lord Lieutenant of Glamorgan – Christopher Rice Mansel Talbot
- Lord Lieutenant of Merionethshire – Edward Lloyd-Mostyn, 2nd Baron Mostyn
- Lord Lieutenant of Monmouthshire – Henry Somerset, 8th Duke of Beaufort
- Lord Lieutenant of Montgomeryshire – Sudeley Hanbury-Tracy, 3rd Baron Sudeley
- Lord Lieutenant of Pembrokeshire – William Edwardes, 3rd Baron Kensington
- Lord Lieutenant of Radnorshire – John Walsh, 1st Baron Ormathwaite
- Bishop of Bangor – James Colquhoun Campbell
- Bishop of Llandaff – Alfred Ollivant
- Bishop of St Asaph – Thomas Vowler Short (retired); Joshua Hughes (from 9 May)
- Bishop of St Davids – Connop Thirlwall

== Events ==
- January — Francis Kilvert begins his famous diary.
- 14 February — In a mining accident at Morfa Colliery, Port Talbot, 30 men are killed.
- April — George Osborne Morgan introduces the Burials Bill and the Places of Worship (Acquisition of Land) Bill to Parliament.
- unknown dates
  - Sir George Gilbert Scott completes the restoration of Bangor Cathedral.
  - In India, Timothy Richards Lewis discovers a nematoid worm, which he calls Filaria sanguinis hominis (later "Wuchereria bancrofti").
  - William Thomas Lewis, 1st Baron Merthyr of Senghenydd, begins acquiring the collieries later known as the Lewis Merthyr collieries in Rhondda.
  - Jacob Lloyd is created a Knight of the Order of St. Gregory the Great by Pope Pius IX.
  - Thomas William Rhys Davids begins a series of articles for the Ceylon branch of the Royal Asiatic Society Journal.

== Arts and literature ==
=== New books ===
- John Ceiriog Hughes — Oriau'r Haf
- David Lloyd Davies — Ceinwen Morgan neu y Rian Ddiwylliedig
- Richard Davies (Mynyddog) — Yr Ail Gynnig

== Sport ==
- Billiards — John Roberts, Sr. loses the English billiards championship after 21 years.
- Association football — Druids of Rhiwabon formed.

== Births ==
- 13 January — Conway Rees, rugby player (died 1932)
- 10 March — George "Honey Boy" Evans, Welsh-born US entertainer (died 1915)
- 20 March — Eluned Morgan, author (died 1938)
- 25 March — Wallace Watts, Wales international rugby union player (died 1950)
- 19 June — Charles Nicholl, Wales international rugby union player (died 1939)
- 29 June
  - Arthur Boucher, Wales international rugby union player (died 1948)
  - Sir Charles Dillwyn-Venables-Llewellyn, 2nd Baronet, politician (died 1951)
- 14 July — Helena Jones, doctor and suffragette (died 1946)
- 16 July — William Henry Prosser, teacher and cricketer (died 1952)
- 27 July — Herbert Millingchamp Vaughan, historian (died 1948)
- 18 August — William Cope, 1st Baron Cope, politician and Wales international rugby player (died 1946)
- 27 September — Thomas Jones (T. J.), civil servant (died 1955)
- 22 October — J. Glyn Davies, scholar, poet and songwriter (died 1953)
- 3 November — Norman Biggs, Wales international rugby player (died 1908)
- 15 November — William Elsey, Wales international rugby player (died 1936)
- 20 December — Sir David Davies, politician (died 1958)
- 29 December — Robert Dewi Williams, teacher, minister and writer (died 1955)
- 31 December — David John Jones, Dean of Llandaff (died 1949)
- December — Ernest William Jones, steamship agent and cricketer (died 1941)
- date unknown
  - John William Evans, politician (died 1906)
  - John Hughes Morris, missionary (died 1953)

== Deaths ==
- 16 March — Thomas Parry, Bishop of Barbados, 74
- 4 April — Owen Wynne Jones, writer, 42
- 15 May — Charles Hinde (army officer), soldier, 49
- 27 May — John Etherington Welch Rolls, Monmouthshire landowner and father of 1st Baron Llangattock, 63
- 23 June — Isaac Hughes, Calvinist missionary and preacher, 71/72
- 1 August — Levi Gibbon, balladeer, 92
- 17 September — Joseph David Jones, composer, 43
- 27 October — Owen Jones Ellis Nanney, politician, 80
- 29 October — Jacob Owen, architect and civil engineer, 92
- 16 November — Harry Longueville Jones, antiquary, 64

== See also ==
- 1870 in Ireland
