= 1954 in Wales =

- Centuries: 18th; 19th; 20th; 21st
- Decades: 1930s; 1940s; 1950s; 1960s; 1970s
- See also: List of years in Wales; Timeline of Welsh history 1954 in The United Kingdom Scotland Elsewhere

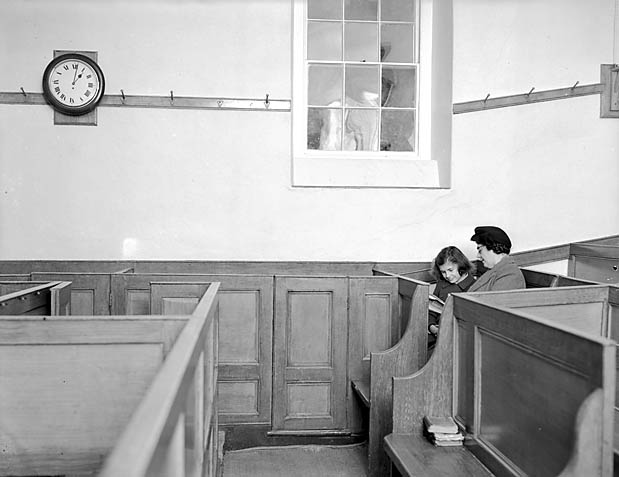

This article is about the particular significance of the year 1954 to Wales and its people.

== Incumbents ==
- Archbishop of Wales – John Morgan, Bishop of Llandaff
- Archdruid of the National Eisteddfod of Wales – Dyfnallt

== Events ==
- 1 April – Civilian flights from the old Cardiff Municipal Airport at Pengam Moors are transferred to the new Cardiff Airport near Rhoose.
- 29 May – Gwyneth Phillips marries John Dunwoody, continuing a dynasty of Labour politicians.
- 19 June – The Welsh Chess Union is founded.
- October – Launch of the Empire News, the first Sunday newspaper to be printed and published in Wales.
- 19 October – Gwilym Lloyd George becomes Home Secretary and Minister for Welsh Affairs – the first Welshman to hold the position.
- 9 December – Flag of the Church in Wales officially inaugurated.

== Arts and literature ==
=== Awards ===
- National Eisteddfod of Wales (held in Ystradgynlais)
- National Eisteddfod of Wales: Chair – John Evans, "Yr Argae"
- National Eisteddfod of Wales: Crown – E. Llwyd Williams, "Y Bannau"
- National Eisteddfod of Wales: Prose Medal – Owen Elias Roberts, Y Gor o Ystradgynlais

=== New books ===
- Dannie Abse – Ash on a Young Man's Sleeve
- Kingsley Amis – Lucky Jim
- Glyn Daniel – Welcome Death
- Margiad Evans – The Nightingale Silenced (unpublished)
- Ronald Fenton – The Story of Sker House
- Eiluned Lewis – Honey Pots and Brandy Bottles
- V. E. Nash-Williams – The Roman Frontier in Wales
- Bertrand Russell – Nightmares of Eminent Persons and Other Stories
- Dylan Thomas – Quite Early One Morning

=== Music ===
- Geraint Evans stars in William Walton's new opera, Troilus and Cressida.
- Alun Hoddinott – Clarinet Concerto (performed at the Cheltenham Festival by Gervase de Peyer with the Hallé Orchestra under Sir John Barbirolli).
- Arwel Hughes – Menna (opera)
- Daniel Jones – Symphony no 4

== Film ==
- Donald Houston co-stars in Doctor in the House.
- Ray Milland stars in Dial M for Murder.
- The Black Knight, starring Alan Ladd, is partly filmed at Castell Coch.

== Broadcasting ==
- 25 January – Under Milk Wood is performed for the first time on BBC radio with an all-Welsh cast led by Richard Burton and including Hugh Griffith, Rachel Thomas and Philip Burton.

== Sport ==
- Football – John Charles finishes the 1953–54 season having scored 42 goals for Leeds United.
- Rugby union – Wales win the Five Nations Championship, but a loss against England prevents Wales lifting the Triple Crown.
- BBC Wales Sports Personality of the Year – Ken Jones

== Births ==
- 5 January – Elgan Rees, Wales international rugby player
- 6 January – John Sparkes, comedian
- 21 January – Tony Ridler, darts player
- 12 March – Chris Needs, broadcaster (died 2020)
- 13 March – Francis Ormsby-Gore, 6th Baron Harlech
- 17 March – Trish Law, born Patricia Bolter, AM, politician
- 6 April – Alan Curtis, footballer
- 19 April – Jon Owen Jones, politician
- 23 May – David Richards, Wales international rugby player
- 28 May – Gwyn Morgan, writer
- 9 June
  - Paul Chapman, rock guitarist
  - Rhys Morgan, Wales international rugby player
- 7 July – Mickey Thomas, Welsh international footballer
- August – Ceri Sherlock, filmmaker and theatre director
- 27 August – Bryn Fôn, singer and actor
- 12 September – Sir Michael Moritz, businessman and philanthropist
- 19 September – Mark Drakeford, politician
- 24 September – Helen Lederer, comedian and actress
- 25 September – Gareth Thomas, politician
- 12 October – Keith Griffiths, architect
- 13 October – Kim Davies, cricketer
- 14 October – Lowri Gwilym, television and radio producer
- 13 November – Les Keen, Wales international rugby player

== Deaths ==
- 12 January – Thomas Brinsmead Williams, cricketer, 69
- 6 March – William Davies Thomas, academic, 74
- 25 March – William Jackson, footballer, 78
- 10 April – Harry Hiams, rugby union international, 67
- 6 May – J. J. Williams, poet and archdruid, 84
- 15 June
  - William Ewart Berry, 1st Viscount Camrose, 74
  - Charles Edwards, politician, 87
- 10 July – Jack Anthony, jockey, 64
- 10 August – Ernest Morgan, architect and painter, 72/73
- 29 September – William John Gruffydd, author and politician, 73
- 31 October – Rhys Davies, trade unionist and politician, 77
- 8 November – Sir Geoffrey Crawshay, soldier and social benefactor, 62
- 3 December – Sir Joseph Davies, statistician and Liberal politician, 87
- 10 December – Sir Cadwaladr Bryner Jones, civil servant and educationist, 82
- 14 December – Cliff Pritchard, Welsh international rugby player, 73
- 20 December – Frank Connah, hockey player, 70
- 22 December – Robert Richards, Welsh politician, 70

== See also ==
- 1954 in Northern Ireland
