= 1871 in Wales =

- Centuries: 17th; 18th; 19th; 20th; 21st
- Decades: 1850s; 1860s; 1870s; 1880s; 1890s
- See also: List of years in Wales; Timeline of Welsh history 1871 in The United Kingdom Scotland Elsewhere

This article is about the particular significance of the year 1871 to Wales and its people.

== Incumbents ==
- Lord Lieutenant of Anglesey – William Owen Stanley
- Lord Lieutenant of Brecknockshire – Charles Morgan, 1st Baron Tredegar
- Lord Lieutenant of Caernarvonshire – Edward Douglas-Pennant, 1st Baron Penrhyn
- Lord Lieutenant of Cardiganshire – Edward Pryse
- Lord Lieutenant of Carmarthenshire – John Campbell, 2nd Earl Cawdor
- Lord Lieutenant of Denbighshire – Robert Myddelton Biddulph
- Lord Lieutenant of Flintshire – Sir Stephen Glynne, 9th Baronet
- Lord Lieutenant of Glamorgan – Christopher Rice Mansel Talbot
- Lord Lieutenant of Merionethshire – Edward Lloyd-Mostyn, 2nd Baron Mostyn
- Lord Lieutenant of Monmouthshire – Henry Somerset, 8th Duke of Beaufort
- Lord Lieutenant of Montgomeryshire – Sudeley Hanbury-Tracy, 3rd Baron Sudeley
- Lord Lieutenant of Pembrokeshire – William Edwardes, 3rd Baron Kensington
- Lord Lieutenant of Radnorshire – John Walsh, 1st Baron Ormathwaite
- Bishop of Bangor – James Colquhoun Campbell
- Bishop of Llandaff – Alfred Ollivant
- Bishop of St Asaph – Joshua Hughes
- Bishop of St Davids – Connop Thirlwall

== Events ==
- 24 February – In a mining accident at Pentre Colliery, Rhondda, 38 men are killed.
- 21 March – Welsh-born journalist Henry Morton Stanley sets out for Africa to seek missing Scottish explorer and missionary Dr. David Livingstone.
- June – Miners' strike in South Wales culminates in defeat for the union.
- 14 August – The Van Railway, built by David Davies Llandinam, opens to carry traffic from the Van lead mines to Caersws.
- 10 November – Stanley locates Livingstone in Ujiji, near Lake Tanganyika, and allegedly greets him saying "Dr. Livingstone, I presume?"
- date unknown
  - Lewis Jones is appointed governor of Chubut Province by the government of Argentina.
  - Operations at the White Rock smelting works in Swansea are extended by Henry Hussey Vivian to include the treatment of silver and lead ore.

== Arts and literature ==
=== Awards ===
- Evan Jones (Gurnos) wins a bardic chair at Ystradyfodwg.

=== New books ===
- W. R. Ambrose – Hynafiaethau, Cofiannau a Hanes Presennol Nant Nantlle, y Traethawd Buddugol yn Eisteddfod Gadeiriol Pen-y-groes
- Robert Fowler, MD – A Complete History of the Case of the Welsh Fasting-Girl
- James Kenward – Ab Ithel
- Thomas Purnell
  - Dramatists of the Present Day
  - Correspondence and Works of Charles Lamb

=== Music ===
- John Thomas (Pencerdd Gwalia) is appointed harpist to Queen Victoria.

== Sport ==
- Rugby union – Neath RFC is founded.

== Births ==
- 5 January – Percy Lloyd, Wales national rugby player (died 1959)
- 23 February – Jack Evans, Wales national rugby player (died 1924)
- 2 March – Billy Bancroft, sportsman (died 1959)
- 28 March – R. Silyn Roberts, Socialist and pacifist writer (died 1930)
- 1 April - Dai St. John, heavyweight boxer (died 1899)
- 6 April – Prince Alexander John of Wales, youngest son of the Prince and Princess of Wales (died 1871, shortly after birth)
- 12 April – Ellis William Davies, politician (died 1939)
- 15 April – John Humphreys Davies, writer (died 1926)
- 11 May – George Howells, academic and writer (died 1955)
- 6 June – Evan Lloyd, Wales international rugby player (died 1951)
- 14 June – David Nicholl, rugby player (died 1918)
- July - Owen Jones, footballer (died 1955)
- 2 July – Sir Evan Williams, 1st Baronet, industrialist (died 1959)
- 3 July – W. H. Davies, poet (died 1940)
- 13 August – Jack Elliott, Wales international rugby player (died 1938)
- 21 September – Alfred Brice, Wales international rugby player (died 1938)
- 1 October – Sir Lewis Lougher, industrialist and politician (died 1955)
- 10 October – Thomas Gwynn Jones, poet (died 1949)
- 3 November – Owen Badger, Wales national rugby player (died 1939)
- 27 November – Robert Evans (Cybi), writer (died 1956)
- 29 November (in England) – Ruth Herbert Lewis, social reformer and collector of Welsh folk songs (died 1946)
- 1 December – Bert Dauncey, Wales international rugby player (died 1955)
- 3 December – Sir Percy Emerson Watkins, civil servant (died 1946)
- date unknown
  - William Jenkins, politician (died 1944)
  - Howard Passadoro, footballer (died 1921)
  - Thomas Mardy Rees, historian and author (died 1953)

== Deaths ==
- 12 January – Richard Hughes, printer and publisher, 76/7
- 19 January – Thomas Jeremy Griffiths, minister, hymn-writer and teacher, about 75
- 30 January – Edward Howell, US politician of Welsh descent, 78
- February – Robert Roberts, musician, 30
- 9 May – Edward Morgan, minister and writer, 53
- 23 July – Arthur James Johnes, judge, 62
- 2 August – David James (Dewi o Ddyfed), writer (born 1803)
- 3 October – David Marks, musician and composer, about 83
- 6 October – Edwin Wyndham-Quin, 3rd Earl of Dunraven and Mount-Earl, 59
- 2 December – Joseph Jones, Catholic priest and bard, 72

== See also ==
- 1871 in Ireland
