= 1948 in Wales =

- Centuries: 18th; 19th; 20th; 21st
- Decades: 1920s; 1930s; 1940s; 1950s; 1960s
- See also: List of years in Wales; Timeline of Welsh history 1948 in The United Kingdom Scotland Elsewhere

This article is about the particular significance of the year 1948 to Wales and its people.

== Incumbents ==
- Archbishop of Wales – David Prosser, Bishop of St David's
- Archdruid of the National Eisteddfod of Wales – Wil Ifan

== Events ==
- 21 May – Hugh Dalton is appointed Chancellor of the Duchy of Lancaster.
- 24 June – Thomas Williams is created 1st Baron Williams of Ynyshir.
- 1 July – The National Museum of Wales opens the Welsh Folk Museum at St Fagans to the public, the first open-air museum in the UK (director: Iorwerth Peate).
- 19 October – Opening of the Hoover washing machine factory at Merthyr Tydfil.
- December – Plas Machynlleth given to the people of the town.
- Aneurin Bevan is instrumental in the passing of the Local Government Act and National Assistance Act.
- Ness Edwards joins the Privy Council.
- Creation of the Welsh Joint Education Committee.
- Beginning of nylon manufacture at Pontypool.
- Jim Griffiths becomes Chairman of the Labour Party.
- The Council for Wales and Monmouthshire is established as an advisory body.
- A residential Welsh-medium preparatory school for boys is founded at Llanilar in Cardiganshire.
- Elsie Joan Lewis is appointed as the first policewoman in Wales in modern times, in Glamorgan.
- Physicist Rhisiart Morgan Davies publishes the results of his work on stress waves.

== Arts and literature ==
- Kingsley Amis becomes a lecturer at the University of Wales, Swansea.

=== Awards ===
- National Eisteddfod of Wales (held in Bridgend)
- National Eisteddfod of Wales: Chair – D. Emrys James,
- National Eisteddfod of Wales: Crown – Euros Bowen, "O'r Dwyrain"
- National Eisteddfod of Wales: Prose Medal – Robert Ivor Parry

=== New books ===
==== English language ====
- Sir Alfred Thomas Davies – The Lloyd George I Knew
- Jack Jones – Some Trust in Chariots

==== Welsh language ====
- Ambrose Bebb – Gadael tir
- Aneirin Talfan Davies – Eliot, Pwshcin, Poe
- William Eames & Megan Ellis – Melin y Ddôl
- Griffith Wynne Griffith – Ffynnon Bethlehem
- Robert David Griffith – Hanes Canu Cynulleidfaol Cymru
- Isaac Daniel Hooson – Y Gwin a Cherddi Eraill
- David James Jones (Gwenallt) – Bywyd a Gwaith Islwyn
- Griffith John Williams – Traddodiad Llenyddol Morgannwg

=== New drama ===
- Saunders Lewis – Blodeuwedd

=== Music ===
- Arwel Hughes – String Quartet No. 1
- David Wynne – Sonata for violin and piano

== Film ==
- Glynis Johns stars in Miranda.
- Hugh Griffith appears in London Belongs to Me
- Wandering Through Wales

== Broadcasting ==
- 1 March – Welsh Rarebit, previously broadcast during the Second World War, begins its run on the BBC Light Programme.

== Sport ==
- Athletics – Tom Richards finishes second in the marathon at the London Olympics, becoming the first Welshman to win an individual athletics medal at the Olympics.
- Equestrianism
  - Harry Llewellyn is part of the team winning a bronze medal at the Olympic Games in London.
  - The only Welsh Grand National to be run at Caerleon is won by Bora's Cottage.
- Rugby Union
  - 21 February – France beats Wales 3–11 at the St Helen's Ground in Swansea.

== Births ==
- 11 January – Terry Williams, rock drummer
- 22 January – Roger Williams, politician
- 1 March – Karl Johnson, actor
- 4 March – Shakin' Stevens, singer
- 1 April
  - Dai Davies, footballer (d. 2021)
  - Peter Law, politician (d. 2006)
  - J. J. Williams, Wales international rugby union player (died 2020)
- 2 April – Tommy David, Wales international rugby union and league player
- 14 May – Albert Alan Owen, composer
- 18 May – Keith Jarrett, rugby player
- 26 May (in London) – Jenny Randerson, politician
- 4 June (in Glasgow) – Jeff Cuthbert, politician
- 14 June – Ffred Ffransis, political activist
- 16 June – Elan Closs Stephens, educator and broadcasting executive
- 2 August – Andy Fairweather-Low, musician
- 9 August – Jackie Lawrence, politician
- 12 September (in Jamaica) – Neville Meade, heavyweight boxer (in Jamaica; died 2010)
- 24 October – Phil Bennett, rugby player (died 2022)
- 14 November (in London) – Charles III (Prince of Wales, 1958–2022)
- 25 November – Paul Murphy, politician
- 1 December – Geraint Davies, politician
- 26 December – Steve Curtis, boxer (d. 1994)
- 28 December – Terry Morgan, civil engineer
- date unknown
  - Alan Llwyd, poet
  - Manon Rhys, writer
  - Howard Thomas, plant scientist (died 2022)
  - Randolph Thomas, Anglican clergyman

== Deaths ==
- 12 January – Wilfred Bailey, 3rd Baron Glanusk, 56
- 19 January – Frederick Phillips, hockey player, 63
- 11 February – Evan Davies, politician in Australia, 58
- 21 February – Tom Pook, Wales international rugby union player, 78
- 8 March – Charlie Thomas, Wales international rugby player
- 9 April – John Daniel Davies, 74
- 25 April – Arthur Boucher, Wales international rugby union player, 77
- 30 April – David Daniel, Wales international rugby union player, 77
- 17 May – David Evans, organist and composer, 74
- 22 May – David Delta Evans (Dewi Hiraddug), journalist, author, and Unitarian minister, 82
- 9 June – Len Trump, Wales international rugby player, 61
- 18 July – John Tywi Jones, Baptist minister and journalist, 78
- 31 July – Herbert Millingchamp Vaughan, historian, 78
- 20 August – David John de Lloyd, composer, 65
- 28 August – Charles Evans Hughes, American politician of Welsh descent, 86
- 4 October – Arthur Whitten Brown, British aviator, in Swansea, 62
- 18 October – Isaac Daniel Hooson, poet, 68
- 17 November – B. B. Mann, Wales international rugby union player, 90

== See also ==
- 1948 in Northern Ireland
