= 1955 in Wales =

- Centuries: 18th; 19th; 20th; 21st
- Decades: 1930s; 1940s; 1950s; 1960s; 1970s
- See also: List of years in Wales; Timeline of Welsh history 1955 in The United Kingdom Scotland Elsewhere

This article is about the particular significance of the year 1955 to Wales and its people.

== Incumbents ==
- Archbishop of Wales – John Morgan, Bishop of Llandaff
- Archdruid of the National Eisteddfod of Wales – Dyfnallt

== Events ==
- 17 March – In the Wrexham by-election, brought about by the death of Labour Party Member of Parliament (MP) Robert Richards, who had held the seat since 1935, James Idwal Jones holds the seat for Labour with a majority of nearly 11,000 votes.
- 18 April–28 May – Charles Evans leads the mountaineering expedition that conquers Kanchenjunga.
- 6 August – The Usk Reservoir is completed, contributing to Swansea's water supply.
- 31 October – The A48 road bridges over the River Neath at Briton Ferry (six years in the building) are officially opened by the Minister of Transport.
- 3 December – The Farmers' Union of Wales breaks away from the National Farmers Union.
- 20 December – Cardiff becomes the official capital of Wales.

== Arts and literature ==
- The Gold Medal for Architecture is introduced to the National Eisteddfod.
- Bertrand Russell retires to Plas Penrhyn, Penrhyndeudraeth.
- The Guild for the Promotion of Welsh Music is founded.

=== Awards ===
- National Eisteddfod of Wales (held in Pwllheli)
- National Eisteddfod of Wales: Chair – Gwilym Ceri Jones, "Gwrtheyrn"
- National Eisteddfod of Wales: Crown – W. J. Gruffydd, "Ffenestri"
- National Eisteddfod of Wales: Prose Medal – M. Selyf Roberts, Deg o'r Diwedd
- Emyr Humphreys wins the Somerset Maugham Award for Hear and Forgive.

=== New books ===
==== English language ====
- Kingsley Amis – That Uncertain Feeling
- (Edwin) Stuart Evans – Elegy for the Death of a Clown (poem)
- Elisabeth Inglis-Jones – The Story of Wales
- T. E. Lawrence – The Mint (posthumously published)
- Dylan Thomas – A Child's Christmas in Wales (posthumously published)
- R. S. Thomas – Song at the Year's Turning (poems)
- Richard Vaughan – Son of Justin

==== Welsh language ====
- Gwilym Thomas Hughes – Ei Seren tan Gwmwl
- Robert Lloyd – Y Pethe
- Louie Myfanwy Thomas writing as Jane Ann Jones – Plant y Foty

=== New drama ===
- Saunders Lewis – Siwan

=== Music ===
- Grace Williams – Penillion

== Film ==
- Stanley Baker plays Richmond in Laurence Olivier's film of Richard III.
- The Constant Husband, starring Rex Harrison, with opening scenes filmed on location at New Quay and Aberaeron in 1954, includes some Welsh dialogue.

== Broadcasting ==
- The Welsh Home Service becomes available on VHF from Wenvoe

=== Welsh-language television ===
- January – First televised Welsh-language play, Cap Wil Tomos

== Sport ==
- Cricket – Wilf Wooller becomes an England Test selector.
- Rugby Union
  - 22 January – Ken Jones becomes Wales's most capped player (36) in a game against England.
  - 12 March – Wales beat Ireland 21–3 at the National Stadium, Cardiff.
  - 26 March – Wales win the Five Nations Championship for the fourth time this decade.
- BBC Wales Sports Personality of the Year – John Disley

== Births ==
- 22 January – Clive Griffiths, footballer (died 2022)
- 30 January – Ian Edwards, footballer
- 23 February – Howard Jones, English-born musician of Welsh parentage
- 4 March – Joey Jones, footballer
- 17 March – John David Lewis, political scientist and historian
- 2 May – Peter Sayer, footballer
- 17 May – Nicola Heywood-Thomas, broadcaster and journalist (died 2023)
- 22 May – Maggie Jones, Baroness Jones of Whitchurch, politician
- 9 June – Alun Pugh, politician
- 21 June (in Sunderland) – Janet Ryder, politician
- 22 June – Green Gartside (Paul Julian Strohmeyer), musician
- 2 August – Alun Davies, biologist
- 3 August – Gordon Davies, footballer
- 4 August – Steve Jones, marathon runner
- 3 September – Eirian Williams, snooker referee
- 29 September – Gareth Davies, rugby player
- 12 October – Brian Flynn, footballer and manager
- 17 November – Amanda Levete, architect
- 7 December – Mihangel Morgan, author and academic
- date unknown
  - Aled Gruffydd Jones, social historian, Librarian of National Library of Wales
  - Martyn Jones, painter

== Deaths ==
- 5 January – Douglas Marsden-Jones, Wales and British Lions rugby player, 61
- 25 January – Robert Dewi Williams, teacher, clergyman and author, 84
- 26 January – Gwilym Davies, Baptist minister, 75
- 29 January – Sir Rhys Rhys-Williams, politician, 89
- 19 March – Tom Evans, Wales international rugby player, 72
- 2 April – Billy O'Neill, Welsh international rugby player, 76
- 27 April – Ambrose Bebb, author, 60
- 19 May – Percy Bush, Wales international rugby union player, 75
- 21 June – Eric Evans, rugby union player and administrator, 61
- 13 July – Ruth Ellis, murderer, 28 (hanged)
- 28 August – Sir Lewis Lougher, businessman and politician, 83
- 28 September – Lionel Rees, airman, Victoria Cross recipient, 71
- 14 October – Harry Parr Davies, songwriter, 41
- 15 October – Thomas Jones (T. J.), founder of Coleg Harlech, 85
- 30 October – Bert Dauncey, Wales international rugby player, 83
- 1 November – Ronw Moelwyn Hughes, politician, 58
- 15 December – V. E. Nash-Williams, archaeologist, 58
- date unknown – Melbourne Johns, munitions worker and wartime secret agent, 55

== See also ==
- 1955 in Northern Ireland
