= 1863 in Wales =

- Centuries: 17th; 18th; 19th; 20th; 21st
- Decades: 1840s; 1850s; 1860s; 1870s; 1880s
- See also: List of years in Wales; Timeline of Welsh history 1863 in The United Kingdom Scotland Elsewhere

This article is about the particular significance of the year 1863 to Wales and its people.

== Incumbents ==
- Lord Lieutenant of Anglesey – Henry Paget, 2nd Marquess of Anglesey
- Lord Lieutenant of Brecknockshire – John Lloyd Vaughan Watkins
- Lord Lieutenant of Caernarvonshire – Sir Richard Williams-Bulkeley, 10th Baronet
- Lord Lieutenant of Cardiganshire – Edward Pryse
- Lord Lieutenant of Carmarthenshire – John Campbell, 2nd Earl Cawdor
- Lord Lieutenant of Denbighshire – Robert Myddelton Biddulph
- Lord Lieutenant of Flintshire – Sir Stephen Glynne, 9th Baronet
- Lord Lieutenant of Glamorgan – Christopher Rice Mansel Talbot
- Lord Lieutenant of Merionethshire – Edward Lloyd-Mostyn, 2nd Baron Mostyn
- Lord Lieutenant of Monmouthshire – Benjamin Hall, 1st Baron Llanover
- Lord Lieutenant of Montgomeryshire – Thomas Hanbury-Tracy, 2nd Baron Sudeley (until 19 February); Sudeley Hanbury-Tracy, 3rd Baron Sudeley (from 21 April)
- Lord Lieutenant of Pembrokeshire – William Edwardes, 3rd Baron Kensington
- Lord Lieutenant of Radnorshire – John Walsh, 1st Baron Ormathwaite
- Bishop of Bangor – James Colquhoun Campbell
- Bishop of Llandaff – Alfred Ollivant
- Bishop of St Asaph – Thomas Vowler Short
- Bishop of St Davids – Connop Thirlwall

== Events ==
- 10 March – Marriage of Edward Albert, Prince of Wales, to Alexandra of Denmark. Alexandra becomes the first Princess of Wales since 1820.
- 28 July – The Anglesey Central Railway Act 1863 (26 & 27 Vict. c.cxxviii) brings about the foundation of the Anglesey Central Railway.
- 23 October – Festiniog Railway introduces steam locomotives into general service, the first time this has been done anywhere in the world on a public railway of such a narrow gauge (2 ft (60 cm)).
- English church services are introduced for English-speaking minorities in Welsh-speaking areas.
- Sir Hugh Owen becomes an honorary secretary of the London committee formed to set up the University of Wales.
- Mesac Thomas becomes the first Bishop of Goulburn, New South Wales, Australia.
- Publication of The Bards of Wales, first written in 1857 by Hungarian poet János Arany, using the story of Edward I's conquest of Wales to disguise criticism of the Austro-Hungarian empire.
- Machynlleth born John Evans arrives in British Columbia, Canada, with a group of other Welsh miners. He subsequently becomes a major political figure in the province.
- Spa pump room built at Trefriw.
- Guest Memorial Library at Dowlais opened.

== Arts and literature ==
=== Awards ===
- National Eisteddfod of Wales is held at Swansea.
- The Newdigate Prize is awarded to Thomas Llewellyn Thomas.

=== New books ===
- John Ceiriog Hughes – Cant o Ganeuon
- John Jones (Ioan Emlyn) – Golud yr Oes
- David William Nash – The Pharaoh of the Exodus
- Ebenezer Thomas – Cyff Beuno

=== Music ===
- John Ceiriog Hughes – Cant O Ganeuon
- John Thomas (Pencerdd Gwalia) – Llewelyn (cantata)

== Sport ==
- Cricket
  - 23 July – South Wales Cricket Club defeat MCC at Lord's.
  - 27 July – South Wales Cricket Club defeat Gentlemen of Kent at Cranbrook.

== Births ==
- 15 January – James Webb, Wales rugby international (died 1913)
- 17 January – David Lloyd George, politician (died 1945)
- 3 March – Arthur Machen, writer (died 1947)
- 16 March – Dan Beddoe, operatic tenor (died 1937)
- 25 March – Owen Philipps, 1st Baron Kylsant (died 1937)
- 13 April – Walter E. Rees, Secretary of the Welsh Rugby Union (died 1949)
- May – William Rees-Davies (judge), politician and lawyer (died 1939)
- 8 May – Charles Taylor Wales rugby international (died 1915)
- 18 May – Lewis Davies (writer), novelist and historian (died 1951)
- 21 May – William Jones Williams, civil servant (died 1949)
- 11 June – Llewellyn Henry Gwynne, first suffragan Bishop of Khartoum (died 1957)
- 18 June – George Essex Evans, Australian poet of Welsh parentage (died 1909)
- 2 July – Billy Douglas, Wales international rugby player (died 1943)
- 7 August – Edward Perkins Alexander, Wales international rugby player (died 1931)
- 8 August – John Herbert Roberts, Baron Clwyd of Abergele, politician (died 1955)
- 17 August – Joseph Harry, minister, writer and teacher (died 1950)
- 29 August – Sir Daniel Lleufer Thomas, magistrate (died 1940)
- 10 September – Walter Rice Evans, Wales international rugby player (died 1909)
- 7 November – Rowley Thomas, Wales international rugby player (died 1949)
- probable – William Retlaw Williams, Welsh writer (died 1944)

== Deaths ==
- 17 February – Ebenezer Thomas (Eben Fardd), poet, 60
- 19 February – Thomas Hanbury-Tracy, 2nd Baron Sudeley, Lord Lieutenant of Montgomeryshire, 62
- 28 February – David Williams (Alaw Goch), industrialist, 53
- 21 March – David Griffiths, missionary, 71
- 24 March – Thomas Powell, industrialist, 84
- 13 April – George Cornewall Lewis, statesman, 56
- May/June – David Bevan Jones (Dewi Elfed), Mormon leader, 55
- 15 July – Edward Pryce Owen, artist, 75
- 8 November – Joseph Hughes (Carn Ingli), poet, 60
- 13 December – Robert Saunderson, printer, 83
- 28 December – Thomas Bevan, Archdeacon of St David's, 63

== See also ==
- 1863 in Ireland
