= 1950 in Wales =

- Centuries: 18th; 19th; 20th; 21st
- Decades: 1930s; 1940s; 1950s; 1960s; 1970s
- See also: List of years in Wales; Timeline of Welsh history 1950 in The United Kingdom Scotland Elsewhere

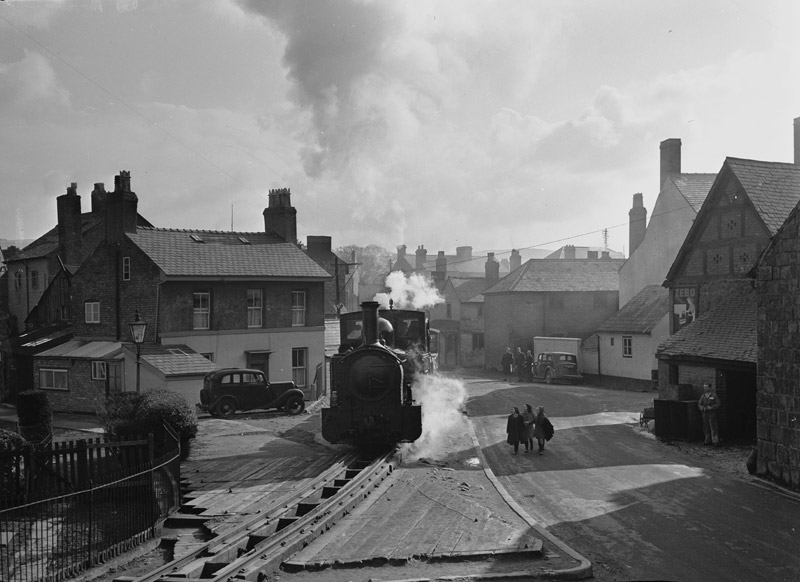

This article is about the particular significance of the year 1950 to Wales and its people.

== Incumbents ==
- Archbishop of Wales – John Morgan, Bishop of Llandaff
- Archdruid of the National Eisteddfod of Wales
  - Wil Ifan (outgoing)
  - Cynan (incoming)

== Events ==
- 23 February – 1950 United Kingdom general election: For the first time ever, the Labour Party contests all Parliamentary seats in Wales. Following the election, Wales has 27 Labour MPs, 4 Liberals, 3 Conservatives and one National Liberal/Conservative.
  - The University of Wales seat is abolished at the dissolution, W. J. Gruffydd having been the last holder.
  - Roderic Bowen is re-elected for Cardiganshire, with the largest Liberal majority in the country.
  - David Ormsby-Gore, the future Lord Harlech, becomes MP for Oswestry.
  - Lynn Ungoed-Thomas, following the abolition of his Llandaff and Barry constituency, is elected MP for Leicester North East.
  - Roy Jenkins, whose Southwark seat has been abolished, is elected for Birmingham Stechford.
  - Elwyn Jones becomes MP for West Ham South.
  - Following the election, Ness Edwards becomes Postmaster-General. During his time in the office, he introduces the greetings telegram.
  - Abertillery's Labour MP, George Daggar, dies on 14 October, to be replaced by Llywelyn Williams.
- 12 March – Llandow air disaster: 80 of the 83 people on board an Avro Tudor V aircraft are killed when it crashes on approach to Llandow in Glamorgan, making it the world's worst air disaster at this time.
- 30 March – William Havard is elected Bishop of St David's.
- 1 June – The Welsh Air Service, the world's first scheduled helicopter service, begins operating between Cardiff, Wrexham and Liverpool.
- 27 August – Six people are killed in a rail collision at Penmaenmawr railway station.
- 9 September – In Swansea, following heavy rain, three houses collapse, killing seven people.
- Ysgol Syr Thomas Jones opens in Amlwch on Anglesey as Britain's first purpose-built comprehensive school.
- Maes Hyfryd and Bryn Teg housing estates at Beaumaris, designed by Colwyn Foulkes, are built.
- Glanllyn is acquired as a permanent site for meetings of Urdd Gobaith Cymru.
- In the Honours lists
  - Physicist Ezer Griffiths is awarded the O.B.E.
  - Agriculturist Thomas James Jenkin is awarded the C.B.E.
  - Industrialist Herbert Henry Merrett is knighted.
- Margaret Haig Thomas, Viscountess Rhondda, becomes President of University College, Cardiff.

== Arts and literature ==
- 21 February – Dylan Thomas arrives in the United States, his first visit to America.
- The first Welsh Drama Festival is held.
- American photojournalist W. Eugene Smith visits the UK to take photographs of working-class life; three of those published are of the South Wales valleys.

=== Awards ===
- National Eisteddfod of Wales (held in Caerphilly) (first "all-Welsh" Eisteddfod)
- National Eisteddfod of Wales: Chair – Gwilym Tilsley
- National Eisteddfod of Wales: Crown – Euros Bowen
- National Eisteddfod of Wales: Prose Medal – withheld

=== New books ===
==== English language ====
- Sir Leonard Twiston Davies – Welsh furniture: an introduction
- Kathleen Freeman – Greek City States
- Llewelyn Wyn Griffith – The Welsh
- Elisabeth Inglis-Jones – Peacocks in Paradise
- Thomas Jones (T. J.) – Welsh Broth
- Richard Llewellyn – A Few Flowers for Shiner
- V. E. Nash-Williams – The Early Christian Monuments of Wales
- Harold Henry Rowley – The Growth of the Old Testament
- Bertrand Russell – Unpopular Essays
- Raymond Williams – Reading and Criticism

==== Welsh language ====
- Ambrose Bebb – Machlud yr Oesoedd Canol
- Aneirin Talfan Davies – Blodeugerdd o englynion
- Edward Morgan Humphreys – Gwŷr enwog gynt
- Edgar Phillips – Caniadau Trefîn
- Arthur Wade-Evans – Coll Prydain
- David Pryse Williams – Canmlwyddiant Libanus ... braslun o'r hanes
- William Crwys Williams – Pedair Pennod

=== Music ===
- Harry Parr Davies – Dear Miss Phoebe (musical)
- Arwel Hughes – Dewi Sant (Saint David) (oratorio)
- Grace Williams – Three Traditional Ballads
- W. S. Gwynn Williams – Breuddwyd Glyndwr

== Film ==
- Glyn Houston makes his film debut in The Blue Lamp, which also stars Meredith Edwards and guest stars Tessie O'Shea.
- Ray Milland stars in Copper Canyon and A Woman of Distinction.

== Sports ==
- Boxing
  - 13 September – Eddie Thomas beats Cliff Curvis at St Helens to become British welterweight champion.
- Football
  - 27 October – Wales international Trevor Ford becomes the most expensive footballer in British history after joining Sunderland for £30,000.
- Rugby union – Wales win their fourth Grand Slam.
- Bowls – The Welsh Ladies Indoor Bowling Association is founded.

== Births ==
- 23 January – John Greaves, Welsh bass player and songwriter
- 7 February – Dai Havard MP, politician
- 16 February (in Nairobi) – Peter Hain MP, politician
- 11 March – Terry Cooper, footballer
- 18 March – Lorraine Barrett AM, politician
- 27 March – Terry Yorath, footballer and football manager
- 3 May – Mary Hopkin, singer
- 5 May (in Saint Kitts) – Pat Thomas, boxer
- 24 May – Geoff Ellis, cricketer
- 26 May – Myron Wyn Evans, chemist (died 2019)
- 2 June – Jonathan Evans MEP, businessman and politician
- 14 June – Rowan Williams, Archbishop of Canterbury
- 25 August (in Dublin) – Brian Gibbons AM, politician
- 8 September – Martyn Woodroffe, swimmer
- 10 September – Tich Gwilym, guitarist (d. 2005)
- 11 October – Robert Pugh, actor
- 16 November – Chris O'Brien, rugby league player
- 28 November – Meic Povey, screenwriter, playwright and actor (d. 2017)
- 8 December – Stephen Richards, judge
- 10 December – John Parsons, footballer

== Deaths ==
- 23 January – Jack Rhapps, dual-code international rugby player, 73
- 13 February – Rees Howells, missionary and founder of the Bible College at Swansea, 70
- 28 February – David Lewis Prosser, Archbishop of Wales, 81
- 9 March – Timothy Evans, wrongly executed for murder, 35
- 15 March – Sir Wilfrid Lewis, judge
- 12 April – Joe Rees, rugby union player, 56
- 29 April – Wallace Watts, Wales international rugby union player, 80
- 15 May – David Edwardes Davies, Bishop of Bangor, 70
- 21 June – General Sir Henry ap Rhys Pryce, officer in the Indian Army, 75
- 23 June – Joseph Harry, minister and poet, 86
- 29 June – H. A. Gwynne, author and newspaper editor, 84
- 2 July – Henry Haydn Jones MP, politician, 86
- 5 July – John Hughes, footballer, 73
- 30 August – Morgan Morgan-Owen, footballer, 73
- 30 August – Ralph Hancock, landscape gardener, 57
- 19 September – David Jones, archdeacon of Carmarthen, 75
- 14 October – George Daggar MP, politician, 71
- 28 October – Alis Mallt Williams, novelist, 83
- 21 November – Hugh Emyr Davies, poet, 72

== See also ==
- 1950 in Northern Ireland
