= 1952 in Wales =

- Centuries: 18th; 19th; 20th; 21st
- Decades: 1930s; 1940s; 1950s; 1960s; 1970s
- See also: List of years in Wales; Timeline of Welsh history 1952 in The United Kingdom Scotland Elsewhere

This article is about the particular significance of the year 1952 to Wales and its people.

== Incumbents ==
- Archbishop of Wales – John Morgan, Bishop of Llandaff
- Archdruid of the National Eisteddfod of Wales – Cynan

== Events ==
- 10 January – An Aer Lingus Douglas DC-3 aircraft on a flight from London to Dublin crashes in Snowdonia, killing twenty passengers and three crew members.
- 29 February – The Pembrokeshire Coast National Park is established.
- June – Pennar Davies is inaugurated as Principal of Swansea Memorial College.
- 5 July – Six miners are killed in a mining accident at Point of Ayr colliery in north Wales.
- 11 August – A Royal Air Force Avro Anson trainer aircraft crash lands on the track of the Snowdon Mountain Railway killing its three aircrew.
- 3 September – Somali-born Mahmood Hussein Mattan is the last person to be hanged in Cardiff Prison, having been convicted of the 6 March murder of Lily Volpert in Tiger Bay. This becomes the first case considered by the Criminal Cases Review Commission, and in 1998 the conviction is ruled to have been wrongful.
- 8 October – David Grenfell becomes Father of the House following the retirement of Hugh O'Neill.
- 19 October – A small Welsh republican group, Y Gweriniaethwyr, make an unsuccessful attempt to blow up the water pipeline leading from the Claerwen dam in mid Wales to Birmingham.
- 23 October – Opening of Claerwen reservoir, the first engagement carried out in Wales by Elizabeth II since her accession as Queen of the United Kingdom. She first sets foot in Wales as monarch at Llandrindod railway station.
- date unknown – Lake Bala bursts its banks and floods many parts of the Vale of Edeirnion.

== Arts and literature ==
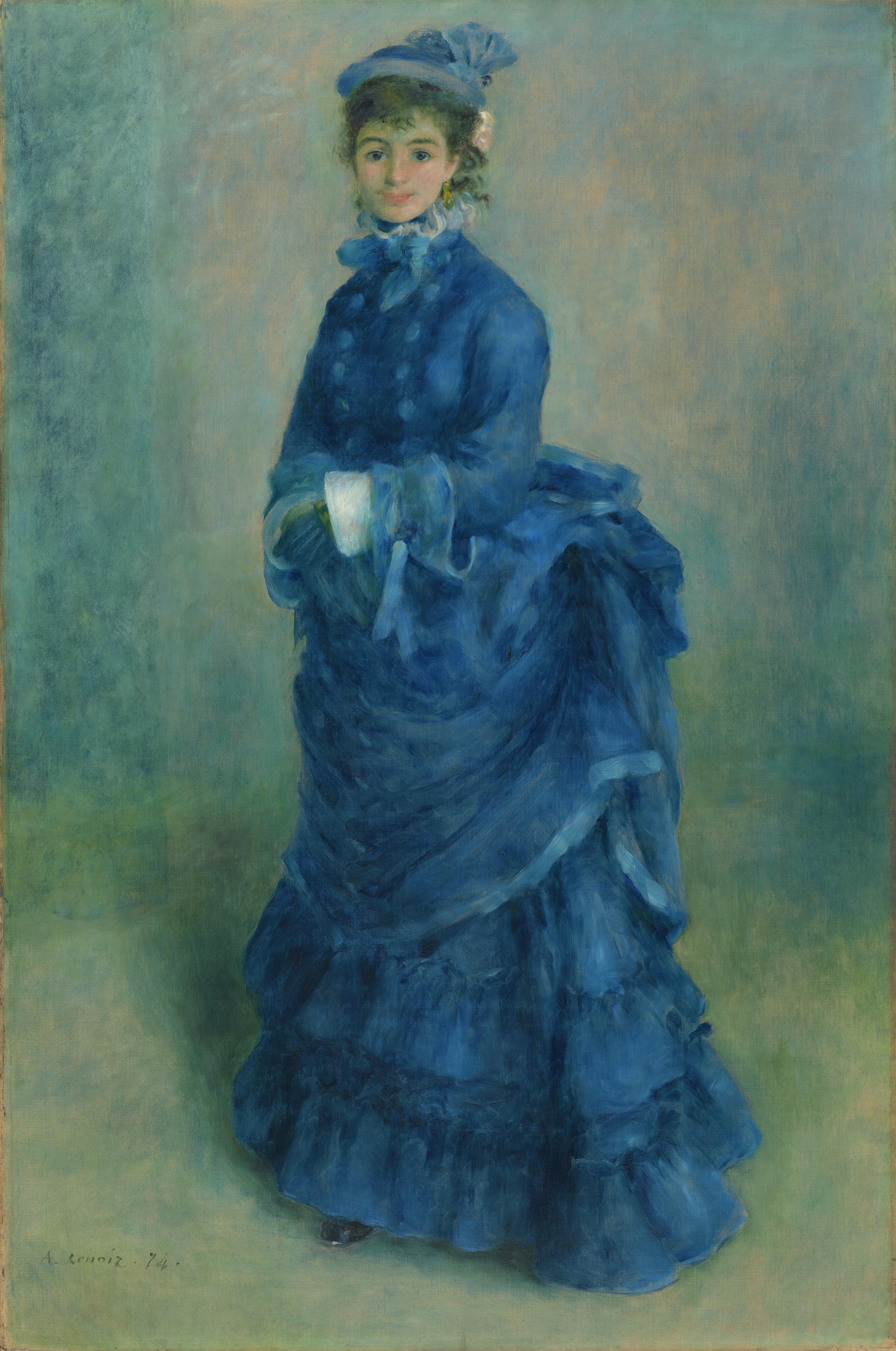
Renoir's La Parisienne is one of the works of art bequeathed to the people of Wales by Gwendoline Davies in 1952.

=== Awards ===
- National Eisteddfod of Wales (held in Aberystwyth)
- National Eisteddfod of Wales: Chair – John Evans, "Dwylo"
- National Eisteddfod of Wales: Crown – withheld
- National Eisteddfod of Wales: Prose Medal – Owen Elias Roberts, "Cyfrinachau Natur"

=== New books ===
==== English language ====
- A. H. Dodd – Studies in Stuart Wales
- Jack Jones – Lily of the Valley
- Bertrand Russell – The Impact of Science on Society
- Richard Vaughan – Moulded in Earth
- Raymond Williams – Drama from Ibsen to Eliot

==== Welsh language ====
- Islwyn Ffowc Elis – Cyn Oeri'r Gwaed
- T. J. Morgan – Y Treigladau a’u Cystrawen
- John Dyfnallt Owen – Rhamant a Rhyddid
- R. Williams Parry – Cerddi'r Gaeaf

=== Drama ===
- Saunders Lewis – Gan Bwyll

=== Fine arts ===
- Gwendoline Davies bequeaths a large part of her art collection to the National Museum of Wales, including Renoir's La Parisienne.

=== Music ===
- David Wynne – Symphony no. 1

=== Recordings ===
- Dylan Thomas records a collection of five of his poems, including Fern Hill and Do not go gentle into that good night, along with the short prose A Child's Christmas in Wales for Caedmon Audio in New York.

=== Film ===
- Richard Burton co-stars in My Cousin Rachel, his first U.S. film.

== Broadcasting ==
- 12 March – Tommy Cooper's TV series, It's Magic, begins its run.
- 15 August – Wenvoe transmitting station begins broadcasting 405-line VHF BBC Television to south Wales and the west of England on Band I channel 5 (66.75 MHz).
- 26 August – Hit radio series Welsh Rarebit transfers to television.

== Sport ==
- Rugby union – Wales win their fifth Grand Slam.
- Summer Olympics – Harry Llewellyn wins a gold medal in the team showjumping competition, riding Foxhunter.

== Births ==
- 9 January – Mike Watkins, Wales international rugby captain
- 24 January – Tony Villars, footballer (d. 2020)
- 13 February – Graham Drury, motorcycle speedway rider (d. 2024)
- 22 March – David Jones, politician
- 3 April – Philip Jenkins, academic and Mastermind champion
- 16 April – Bob Humphrys, sports broadcaster (d. 2008)
- 21 April – Cheryl Gillan, politician, Secretary of State for Wales (d. 2021)
- 5 May – Andrew Davies AM, politician
- 3 June – David Richards, entrepreneur and businessman
- 12 June – Jed Williams, jazz journalist
- 12 August – Robert Minhinnick, poet
- 7 September – Irene James AM, politician
- 18 October – Hilary Bevan Jones, television producer
- 17 November – David Emanuel, fashion designer
- 20 November – Karen Sinclair, politician
- date unknown – Menna Elfyn, poet

== Deaths ==
- 8 January – Arthur Lewis, photographer, 66
- 3 March – John Emlyn Emlyn-Jones, shipowner and politician, 63
- 15 April – Idris Lewis, conductor and composer, 62
- 25 April (in Broadstairs) – Sir John Milsom Rees, surgeon, 86
- 14 May – Elizabeth Jane Lloyd, Mrs Louis Jones, academic, 63
- 31 May – Ifor Leslie Evans, academic, 55
- 22 August – Llewela Davies, pianist and composer, 81
- 25 August – James Kitchener Davies, poet, dramatist and nationalist, 50
- 23 October – Windham Wyndham-Quin, 5th Earl of Dunraven and Mount-Earl, politician, 95
- 24 October – Ivor Llewellyn Brace, judge, 54
- 28 October (in Sydney) – Billy Hughes, London-born Prime Minister of Australia, 90
- 9 November – George Herbert, 4th Earl of Powis, 88
- 11 November – Sir William Llewelyn Davies, national librarian, 65
- 28 November – Ernie George, Wales international rugby player, c.81
- 2 December – Tom Jackson, Wales international rugby player, 82
- 15 December (in London) – Sir William Goscombe John, sculptor, 92
- 26 December (in London) – Lyn Harding, actor, 85
- 31 December – John Cledwyn Davies, politician, 83

== See also ==
- 1952 in Northern Ireland
