= Swansea Festival =

Swansea Festival may refer to a number of festivals that take place in Swansea, Wales.:

- Swansea Festival of Music and the Arts, an annual event during October.
- Swansea Bay Summer Festival, an annual event that runs during summer, from May to September.
- Swansea Film Festival
