= Elizabeth Lloyd =

Elizabeth Lloyd may refer to:

- Elizabeth Jane Lloyd (1928–1995), British artist and teacher
- Elizabeth Jane Lloyd, Mrs Louis Jones (1889–1952), Welsh scholar
- Liz Lloyd, deputy chief of staff for Tony Blair's last administration
- Elizabeth Maria Bowen Thompson (1812/13–1869), née Lloyd, British educator missionary

== See also ==
- Elisabeth Lloyd, American philosopher of science
