= Y Rhedegydd =

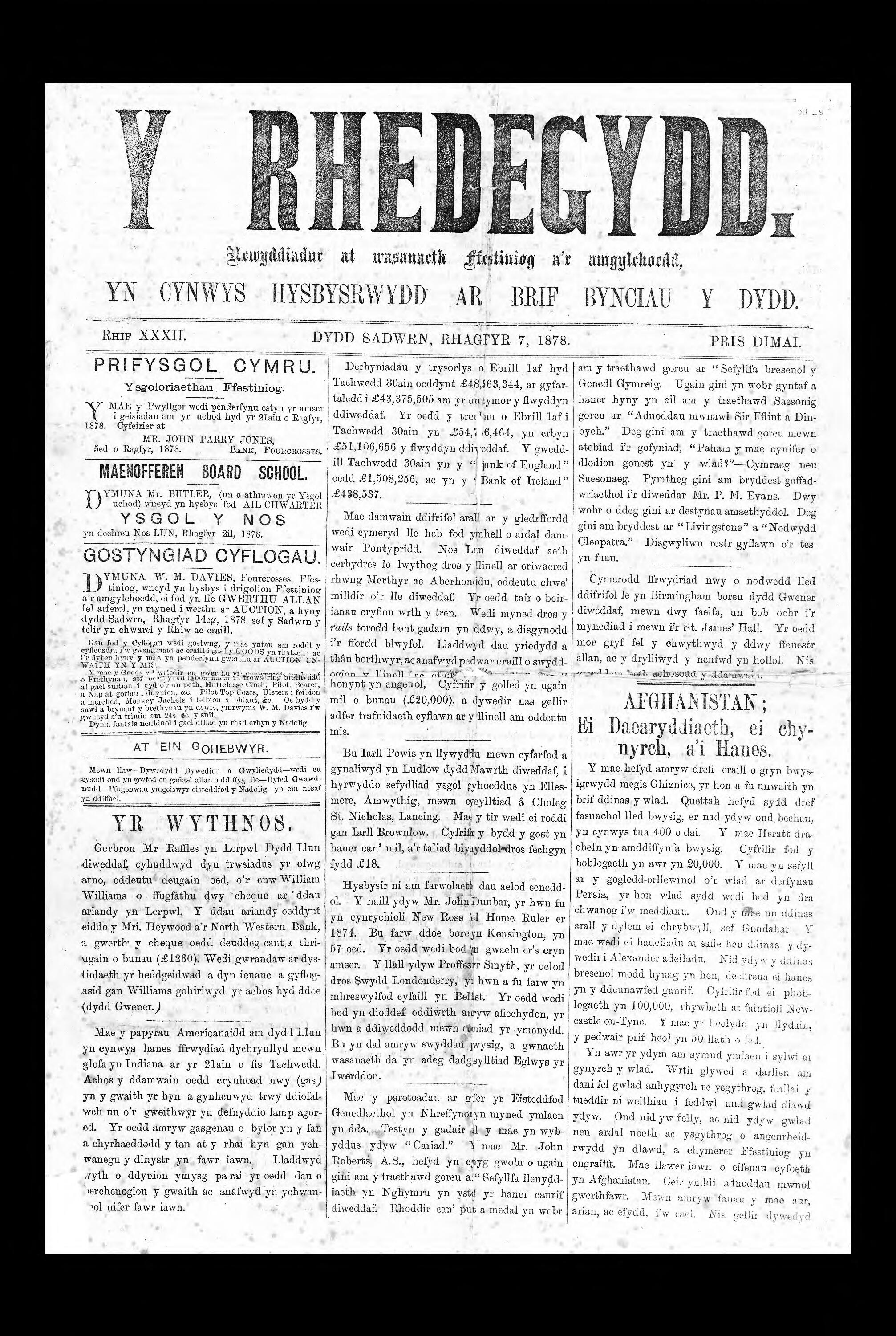
- Type: weekly newspaper
- Owner: John Daniel Davies (1906)
- Editor: John Daniel Davies, Robert Owen Hughes[*]
- City: Blaenau Ffestiniog

Y Rhedegydd (established in 1878) was a weekly Welsh language newspaper distributed around Blaenau Ffestiniog and districts of Caernarfonshire and Merionethshire. The newspaper mainly addressed local news and information.
