= William Prosser =

William Prosser may refer to:

- William Lloyd Prosser (1898–1972), American legal scholar
- William Henry Prosser (1870–1952), Welsh cricketer
- William Prosser, Lord Prosser (1934–2015), Scottish judge
- William F. Prosser (1834–1911), American politician
