= 1873 in Wales =

- Centuries: 17th; 18th; 19th; 20th; 21st
- Decades: 1850s; 1860s; 1870s; 1880s; 1890s
- See also: List of years in Wales; Timeline of Welsh history 1873 in The United Kingdom Scotland Elsewhere

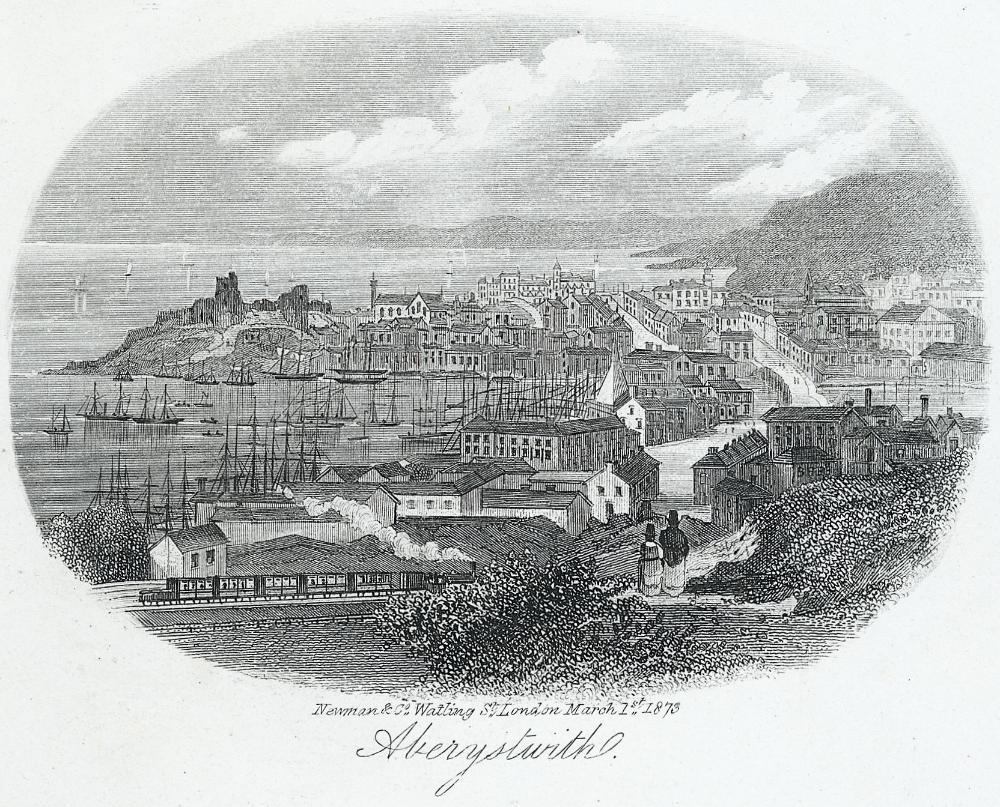
View over town of Aberystwith and harbour from Trefechan, 1873.

This article is about the particular significance of the year 1873 to Wales and its people.

== Incumbents ==
- Lord Lieutenant of Anglesey – William Owen Stanley
- Lord Lieutenant of Brecknockshire – Charles Morgan, 1st Baron Tredegar
- Lord Lieutenant of Caernarvonshire – Edward Douglas-Pennant, 1st Baron Penrhyn
- Lord Lieutenant of Cardiganshire – Edward Pryse
- Lord Lieutenant of Carmarthenshire – John Campbell, 2nd Earl Cawdor
- Lord Lieutenant of Denbighshire – William Cornwallis-West
- Lord Lieutenant of Flintshire – Sir Stephen Glynne, 9th Baronet
- Lord Lieutenant of Glamorgan – Christopher Rice Mansel Talbot
- Lord Lieutenant of Merionethshire – Edward Lloyd-Mostyn, 2nd Baron Mostyn
- Lord Lieutenant of Monmouthshire – Henry Somerset, 8th Duke of Beaufort
- Lord Lieutenant of Montgomeryshire – Sudeley Hanbury-Tracy, 3rd Baron Sudeley
- Lord Lieutenant of Pembrokeshire – William Edwardes, 4th Baron Kensington
- Lord Lieutenant of Radnorshire – John Walsh, 1st Baron Ormathwaite
- Bishop of Bangor – James Colquhoun Campbell
- Bishop of Llandaff – Alfred Ollivant
- Bishop of St Asaph – Joshua Hughes
- Bishop of St Davids – Connop Thirlwall

== Events ==
- 1 March – The sailing ship Chacabuco sinks off the Great Orme with the loss of 24 lives.
- 18 March – Work begins on construction of the Severn Tunnel.
- 30 March – The Glyn Valley Tramway opens as a horse-worked line to carry slate and other minerals from Glyn Ceiriog to Chirk.
- 19 August – The Holyhead Breakwater (the longest in the world) is officially opened by Albert Edward, Prince of Wales. having taken 28 years to construct.
- 9 October – The first recorded sheepdog trial in the UK takes place at Bala.
- 2 December – In a mining accident at Hafod Colliery, Rhiwabon, five men are killed.
- date unknown – Construction of:
  - Tŵr Mawr Lighthouse on Ynys Llanddwyn.
  - Buckley Arms hotel, Dinas Mawddwy, in reinforced concrete.

== Arts and literature ==
=== New books ===
- Rhoda Broughton – Nancy
- Robert Elis (Cynddelw) – Manion Hynafiaethol
- Ebenezer Thomas – Gweithiau Barddonol Eben Fardd (posthumously published)

=== Music ===
- Henry Brinley Richards – Songs of Wales
- Richard Davies (Mynyddog) writes the song "Rheolau yr Aelwyd", the basis of "Sosban Fach".

== Sport ==
- December – Major Walter Wingfield of Nantclwyd Hall at Llanelidan designs a game for the amusement of his visitors. Wingfield soon patents nets for the game of lawn tennis, which he calls "sphairistike".

== Births ==
- 7 January – Christopher Williams, artist (died 1934)
- 16 January – Ivor Guest, 1st Viscount Wimborne, politician (died 1939)
- 7 April
  - John Dyfnallt Owen, poet and Archdruid (died 1956)
  - Charles Butt Stanton, politician (died 1946)
- 23 April – Sir Robert Thomas, 1st Baronet, politician (died 1951)
- 1 May – Harry Evans, musician (died 1914)
- 22 May – J. Brynach Davies (Brynach) (died 1923)
- 5 June – Ben Davies, Wales international rugby player (died 1930)
- 14 October – Sam Livesey, actor (died 1936)
- date unknown – Arthur Tysilio Johnson, plantsman and author of The Perfidious Welshman (died 1956)

== Deaths ==
- January – John Emlyn Jones, poet, 54
- 27 January – Josiah Thomas Jones, publisher, 73
- 20 February – (at Launceston, Tasmania) William Jones, Chartist leader, 64
- 29 March – David Jones, merchant in Australia, 80
- 17 May – Lord William Paget, soldier and politician, 70
- 9 October – John Evan Thomas, sculptor, 63
- 31 October – William Ambrose (Emrys), poet, 60
- 10 November – Maria Jane Williams, musician, 78

== See also ==
- 1873 in Ireland
