= 1951 in Wales =

- Centuries: 18th; 19th; 20th; 21st
- Decades: 1930s; 1940s; 1950s; 1960s; 1970s
- See also: List of years in Wales; Timeline of Welsh history 1951 in The United Kingdom Scotland Elsewhere

This article is about the particular significance of the year 1951 to Wales and its people.

== Incumbents ==
- Archbishop of Wales – John Morgan, Bishop of Llandaff
- Archdruid of the National Eisteddfod of Wales – Cynan

== Events ==
- 3 May – Josef Herman's Miners, a mural commissioned for the Minerals of the Island Pavilion at the Festival of Britain, is displayed for the first time.
- 14 May – The Talyllyn Railway is reopened by the Talyllyn Railway Preservation Society, generally considered to be the world's first such voluntary body to operate a railway.
- 17 July – The Chancellor of the Exchequer opens the Abbey Works at Port Talbot Steelworks at Margam, Europe's largest steel plant.
- 31 July–11 August – Festival Ship Campania is on show in Cardiff Docks as part of the Festival of Britain. Steam tug Earl capsizes while assisting her to berth.
- 12 October – Penrhyn Castle and estate, given to HM Treasury in lieu of death duties, is accepted by the National Trust.
- 28 October – Sir David Maxwell Fyfe is appointed the first-ever Minister for Welsh Affairs.
- 20 November – Snowdonia becomes a National Park.
- Brynmawr Rubber Factory completed.

== Arts and literature ==
=== Awards ===
- National Eisteddfod of Wales (held in Llanrwst)
- National Eisteddfod of Wales: Chair – Brinley Richards
- National Eisteddfod of Wales: Crown – T. Glynne Davies
- National Eisteddfod of Wales: Prose Medal – Islwyn Ffowc Elis

=== New books ===
- Ambrose Bebb – Machlud yr Oesoedd Canol
- Edward Tegla Davies – Y Foel Faen
- Islwyn Ffowc Elis – Cyn Oeri'r Gwaed
- Eynon Evans – Prize Onions
- W. F. Grimes – The Prehistory of Wales
- Thomas Jones – Memoirs of Thomas Jones, Penkerrig, Radnorshire, 1803
- Donald Peers – Pathway
- John Cowper Powys – Porious: A Romance of the Dark Ages
- Lynette Roberts – Gods with Stainless Ears: a Heroic Poem
- Richard Vaughan – Moulded in Earth
- Ronald Welch – The Gauntlet

=== New drama ===
- Peter Philp – Castle of Deception

=== Music ===
- 17–22 September – The fourth annual Swansea Festival of Music and the Arts opens with a controversial speech by one of Wales's leading composers, Daniel Jones. The festival is the final component in the Festival of Britain and consists of seven programmes, featuring Welsh composer Arwel Hughes's new oratorio St. David and appearances by Victoria de los Ángeles, Zino Francescatti, André Navarra, Walter Susskind and Jean Martinon.
- Mai Jones – "Rhondda Rhapsody" (theme from the radio programme, Welsh Rarebit)
- D. Afan Thomas – Magnificat in F
- Grace Williams – The Dancers

== Film ==
- David, the Welsh cinematic contribution to the Festival of Britain. It is based on the real-life story of the poet David Rees Griffiths (Amanwy), who plays himself.

== Broadcasting ==
- 28 May – Sir Harry Secombe stars in the first broadcast of Crazy People (later renamed The Goon Show).
- Welsh Rarebit transfers from stage to radio.

== Sport ==
- Boxing – February 21: Eddie Thomas wins the European welterweight title.

== Births ==
- 5 February – Geraint Watkins, musician
- 7 March – Boyd Clack, actor and screenwriter, in Vancouver, Canada
- 31 March
  - Henry Spinetti, musician
  - Sir Wyn Lewis Williams, judge
- 13 April – Leszek Borysiewicz, immunologist
- 17 May – Simon Hughes, politician
- 28 May – Phil Rogers, potter and author
- 8 June – Bonnie Tyler (born Gaynor Hopkins), singer (died 2026 in Portugal)
- 2 July – Gareth Glyn (born Gareth Glynne Davies), composer
- 15 August – Berwyn Price, athlete
- September – Richard Parry-Jones, automotive engineer (died 2021)
- 3 September – Ray Gravell, rugby player and radio presenter (died 2007)
- 11 September – Gareth Jenkins, Wales rugby coach
- 18 November – David Llewellyn, golfer
- 24 November – Graham Price, rugby player
- 3 December – Nicky Stevens, pop singer
- 24 December – Nick Griffiths, Australian politician, in Barry, Wales

== Deaths ==
- 23 January – Charlie Pugh, Wales international rugby player, 54
- 28 February – Evan Lloyd, Wales international rugby player, 79
- 5 March – David Thomas, Archdeacon of Cardigan
- 6 March – Ivor Novello, composer, actor and singer, 58 (in London)
- 14 March – Evan Walters, artist, 58
- 19 March – Jack Jones, Welsh international rugby player, 65
- 15 June – James Grey West, architect, 66 (in Beer, Devon)
- 18 May – Lewis Davies, writer, 88
- 3 July – Gwendoline Davies, philanthropist, 69
- 13 August – David Jenkins, Wales national rugby player, 47 (in Whitley Bay)
- 22 August – Timothy Davies, politician, 94
- 29 August – Alf Davies, trade union leader, 53-55
- 8 September – W. Aubrey Thomas, Welsh-born US politician, 85
- 27 September – Robert Thomas, politician, 78
- 29 September
  - Llewellyn Evans, hockey player, 75
  - Evan Roberts, preacher, 72
- 17 October – Sir Arthur Probyn Jones, 2nd Baronet, barrister and politician, 59
- 30 November – Dai Fitzgerald, Wales international rugby union player, 79
- 3 December – George Henry Powell, songwriter, 71

== See also ==
- 1951 in Northern Ireland
