= Kim Davis (disambiguation) =

Kim Davis (born 1965) was the county clerk of Rowan County, Kentucky who garnered notoriety for defying a U.S. federal court order to issue marriage licenses to same-sex couples.

Kim Davis may also refer to:

- Kim Davis (singer) (21st century), Canadian singer-songwriter
- Kim Davis (ice hockey) (born 1957), retired Canadian athlete
- Kim Davis (executive), American corporate executive for the National Hockey League
- Kim Davis, or Choice (20th century), American rapper
- Kim Davis, president of the Baltic-American Freedom Foundation
- Kim Davis, lead singer of Eruption
- Kim Davis, guitarist of Point Blank

== See also ==
- Kimberly Davis (disambiguation)
- Kim Davies (born 1954), Welsh cricketer
- Kimberley Davies (born 1973), Australian actress
- Kimberly Bailey American inventor
