= Arthur Lewis =

Arthur Lewis may refer to:

- Arthur Lewis (parathlete) (born 1972), American Paralympic athlete
- Arthur Lewis (shot putter), Welsh athlete
- Arthur Lewis (English cricketer) (1901–1980), English cricketer
- Arthur Lewis (Australian cricketer) (1830–1907), Australian cricketer
- Arthur Lewis (Australian politician) (1882–1975), member of the Australian Parliament
- Arthur Lewis (British politician) (1917–1998), English Labour MP for Newham North West
- Arthur Lewis (rugby union) (1941–2026), Wales and British Lions international rugby union player
- Arthur Lewis (photographer) (1885–1952), Welsh photographer
- Arthur Bernard Lewis (1926–2010), American television writer and producer
- Arthur John Lewis (1879–1961), member of the Canadian House of Commons
- Arthur Joseph Lewis Jr. (born 1934), Massachusetts politician
- W. Arthur Lewis (1915–1991), St Lucian winner of the 1979 Nobel Prize in Economics
- Art Lewis (1911–1962), American football player and coach
- Arthur Lewis, a character in the film Beethoven's 2nd
- SS Arthur R. Lewis, a Liberty ship

== See also ==
- Arthur Louis (1950–2014), musician whose surname is pronounced luːɪs (Lewis)
