= Kimberly Davis =

Kimberly Davis may refer to:

- Amber O'Neal, a professional wrestler whose legal name is Kimberly Dawn Davis
- Kimberly Davis, American singer-songwriter and lead singer of the band Chic
- Kim Davis, clerk of Rowan County, Kentucky

== See also ==
- Kimberley Davies, Australian actress
- Kim Davis (disambiguation)
