= Golud yr Oes =

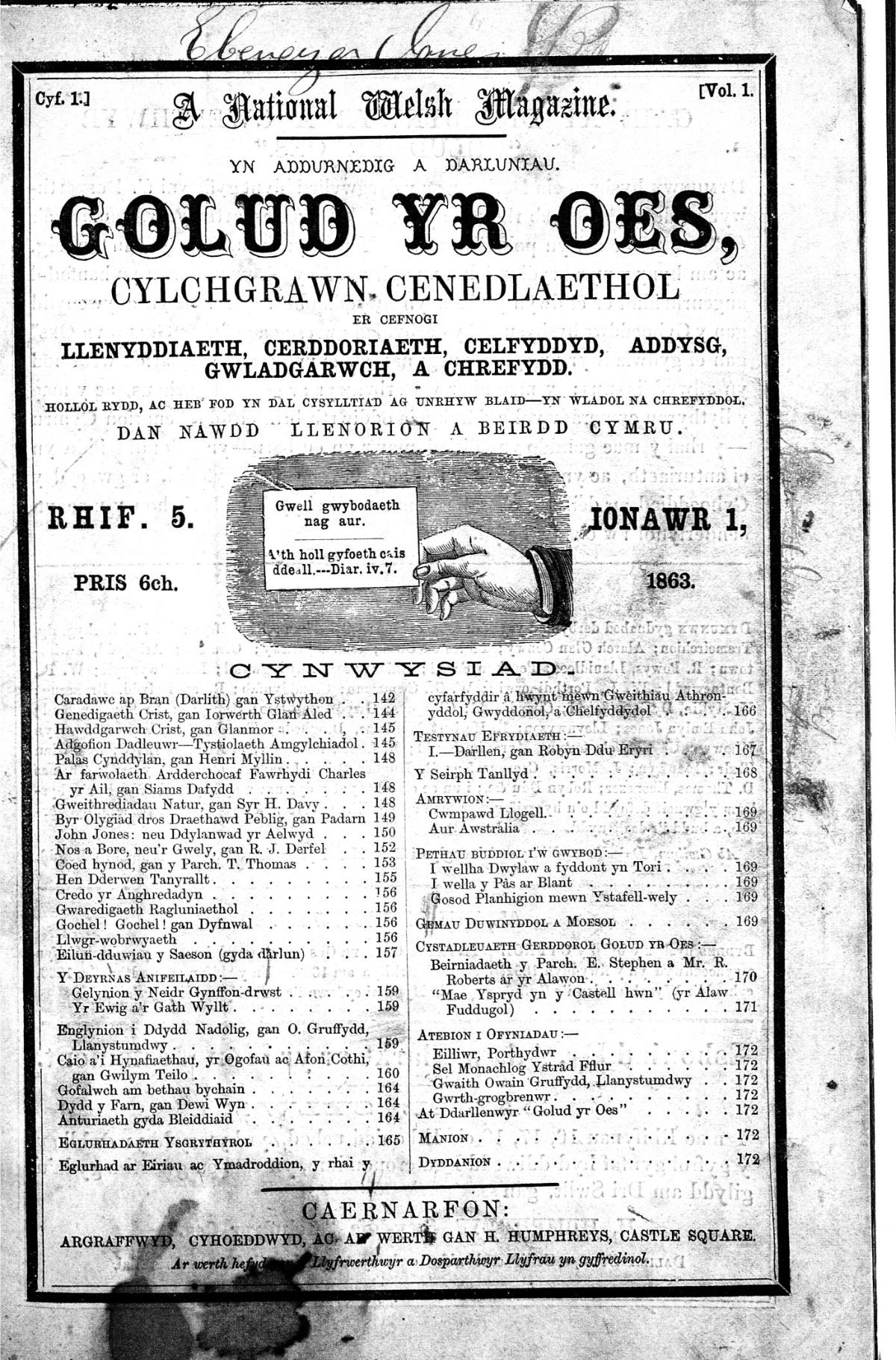
Golud yr oes (Welsh Journal)

Golud yr Oes was a 19th-century Welsh language periodical, first published by printer and publisher Hugh Humphreys (1817-1896) in Caernarfon in 1862. It contained a wide range of articles on subjects such as literature, music, history, religion, science, and nature. The journal is notable for the innovative use of engravings from steel and copper plates, making it one of the most ambitious and visual Welsh periodicals of the period.
