= Dai St. John =

Wales boxer

Personal information
- Nationality: Welsh
- Born: David Jones; 1 April 1871 Resolven, Wales
- Died: 23 November 1899 (aged 28) Orange Free State, South Africa
- Weight: Heavyweight

Boxing career
- Stance: Orthodox

David Jones (1 April 1871 – 23 November 1899) who fought under the name Dai St. John was a Welsh heavyweight boxer. In a time before regulated championship titles, St. John used the press to proclaim himself as heavyweight champion of Wales after beating John O'Brien, a fighter he spent his early career building a rivalry against. Despite a high-profile defeat to O'Brien in 1894, St. John continued to fight, but a disastrous contest in which as a cornerman a boxer died at an unsanctioned match saw his career put in jeopardy. A successful period as a sparring partner for Australian champion Peter Jackson revived his career. After joining the British Army, he was posted to South Africa where he fought in the Second Boer World and died in heroic circumstances at the Battle of Belmont.

== Boxing career ==
St. John was born David Jones in Resolven near Neath in 1871. He was extremely tall for his time, being 6 foot 3 inches. A coal miner by occupation, St. John supplemented his wage through illegal boxing matches and fighting at local fairgrounds. At the age of 19 he travelled to a fairground in Neath where Cardiff based boxer John O'Brien was fighting at a booth. O'Brien, who was recognised as the Welsh heavyweight champion, had been fighting all day and foolishly agreed to accept St. John when he challenged him to a fight. The fight ended in defeat for O'Brien and caused a rift between the two fighters which continued throughout their careers.

Not long after the meeting with O'Brien the two men travelled to London where they spent some time at Bob Habbajim's Boxing School, though a lack of credible opponents led to St. John returning to Wales. With the increasing popularity of gloved boxing, St John was able to engage in more legal fights, and a fight was arranged between him and Tom James of Aberaman at the Drill Hall in Merthyr Tydfil. St. John weighed in at 14 stone 8 pounds, an advantage of 20 pounds over his opponent as well as being three inches taller. As the fight started it was noticed that both men were out of condition, and at the end of the first round both were out of breath. It took until the fourth round for St. John to take advantage landing with a heavy blow to knock his opponent out.

With O'Brien suffering from ill-health and James already beaten, St. John laid claim to the title of Welsh heavyweight champion. This infuriated O'Brien who made it known in the local press that he would challenge St. John to settle the matter. In truth O'Brien was in no condition to face St. John, but his main intention was to publicly challenge his claim. St. John looked for a new opponent, but with little success. Instead a rematch with James was arranged. At first there was interest for the fight to be held at the Kennington Club in London, but the time table suggested did not favour St. John and the bout was arranged for the People's Park in Pontypridd. A large crowd turned out to watch the fight, which saw both men in far better condition than their first encounter. The fight ended in the sixth with St. John the victor, despite being pushed hard by James in the second and third rounds.

In early 1894, O'Brien challenged St.John to stake up £50 to face each other, which was finally agreed to but a venue was yet to be decided. In the buildup to the match the two men met in the ring, but as seconds in a fight between Sam Butcher and Pawdy McCarthy. St. John was in Butcher's corner, and his friend's victory over McCarthy further rankled O'Brien. Eventually interest was shown by the National Sporting Club in London which offered a purse of £50 to host the contest between St. John and O'Brien. The two met on 23 April 1894 and both men had trained tirelessly for the occasion. Despite giving away height and weight to St. John, O'Brien's boxing ability was decisive to the result as he put St. John down in both the second and third rounds. The fight ended in the fifth with O'Brien victorious. After the fight St. John tried to force a rematch with O'Brien and also put out challenges to some of England's best fighters, including Jem Smith, but none were accepted.

With challengers thin on the ground St. John joined the British Army. During authorised leave, St. John was asked to take up the position of cornerman in a fight at a slaughterhouse in Aberdare between David Rees and Thomas Robert Edwards. The fight ended in tragedy when Rees was knocked out of the ring cracking his head on the stone floor. As the crowd fled, St. John remained behind in an attempt to revive the stricken Rees, but the fighter died before medical assistance arrived. Although St. John was cleared of any wrongdoing it cast a shadow over his career. His boxing career was saved when a call came out for a sparring partner for Australian heavyweight champion Peter Jackson who had recently arrived in London. St. John's name was mentioned and he travelled to London where he and Jackson struck up a strong relationship. His time spent with Jackson resulting in the improvement of St John's boxing skills and observers noted the St. John appeared more fluid when he brought Jackson to Pontypridd in an exhibition match.

With St. John's career saved he continued to look for further fights in Wales. He fought James at least one more time, when the two met in Samuel's Saloon in Neath. St. John is reported to have been in poor shape going into the contest and James' superior fighting style put him in charge as the fight came to the end of its six-round distance. When the referee called the contest a draw, there was dissent from large portions of the crowd.

== Military history and death ==
In September 1896, St. John joined the Grenadier Guards. In 1897 he was arrested for being absent without leave after leaving his post in London to fight in Cardiff. St. John was reported as being happy with life in the armed forces, he just found the restrictions connected with the job, limiting.

In 1898, after time spent serving in Gibraltar, St. John was posted on a Nile Expedition. This led to him seeing action at the Battle of Omdurman in Sudan. With the outbreak of the Second Boer War, St John was part of the 3rd Grenadier Guards sent to South Africa. On 23 November 1899, the 3rd Grenadier Guards were involved in the Battle of Belmont, and St John was amongst the troops pinned down at the base of Mount Belmont by Boer snipers on higher ground. When the decision was made to charge the position, St. John was at the forefront of his troop and engaged in hand-to-hand combat with the enemy. Reports vary widely, but it is stated that he killed between four and twelve combatants with his bayonet before his weapon became stuck in an enemy. On trying to retrieve his weapon he was shot in the temple and killed.

== Bibliography ==
- Davies, Lawrence (2011). Mountain Fighters, Lost Tales of Welsh Boxing. Cardiff: Peerless Press. ISBN 978-095703-420-4.
