= Thomas Williams (cricketer, born 1884) =

Welsh cricketer

Personal information
- Full name: Thomas Brinsmead Williams
- Born: 18 June 1884; Newport, Monmouthshire
- Died: 12 January 1954 (aged 69); Llandaff, Glamorgan
- Batting: Unknown
- Bowling: Unknown

Domestic team information
- Years: Team
- 1926: Wales
- 1904–1934: Monmouthshire

Career statistics
Competition	First-class
Matches	1
Runs scored	43
Batting average	43.00
100s/50s	–/–
Top score	43
Balls bowled	–
Wickets	–
Bowling average	–
5 wickets in innings	–
10 wickets in match	–
Best bowling	–
Catches/stumpings	1/–
- Source: Cricinfo, 30 August 2011

Thomas Brinsmead Williams (18 June 1884 – 12 January 1954) was a Welsh cricketer. Williams' batting and bowling styles are unknown. He was born in Newport, Monmouthshire.

Williams made his debut for Monmouthshire in the 1904 Minor Counties Championship against Glamorgan. He played Minor counties cricket for the county from 1904 to 1934, making 115 appearances. After the 1934 season, Monmouthshire no longer entered a team in the Minor Counties Championship. During his career he played a single first-class match for Wales against Ireland. In this match he batted once, scoring 43 runs in the Welsh first-innings before being dismissed by Gustavus Kelly.

He died in Llandaff, Glamorgan on 12 January 1954.
