= David Jones (Dean of Llandaff) =

Welsh Anglican priest (1870–1949)

David John Jones (31 December 1870 – 14 March 1949) was a Welsh Anglican priest, who served as Dean of Llandaff from 1931 to 1948.

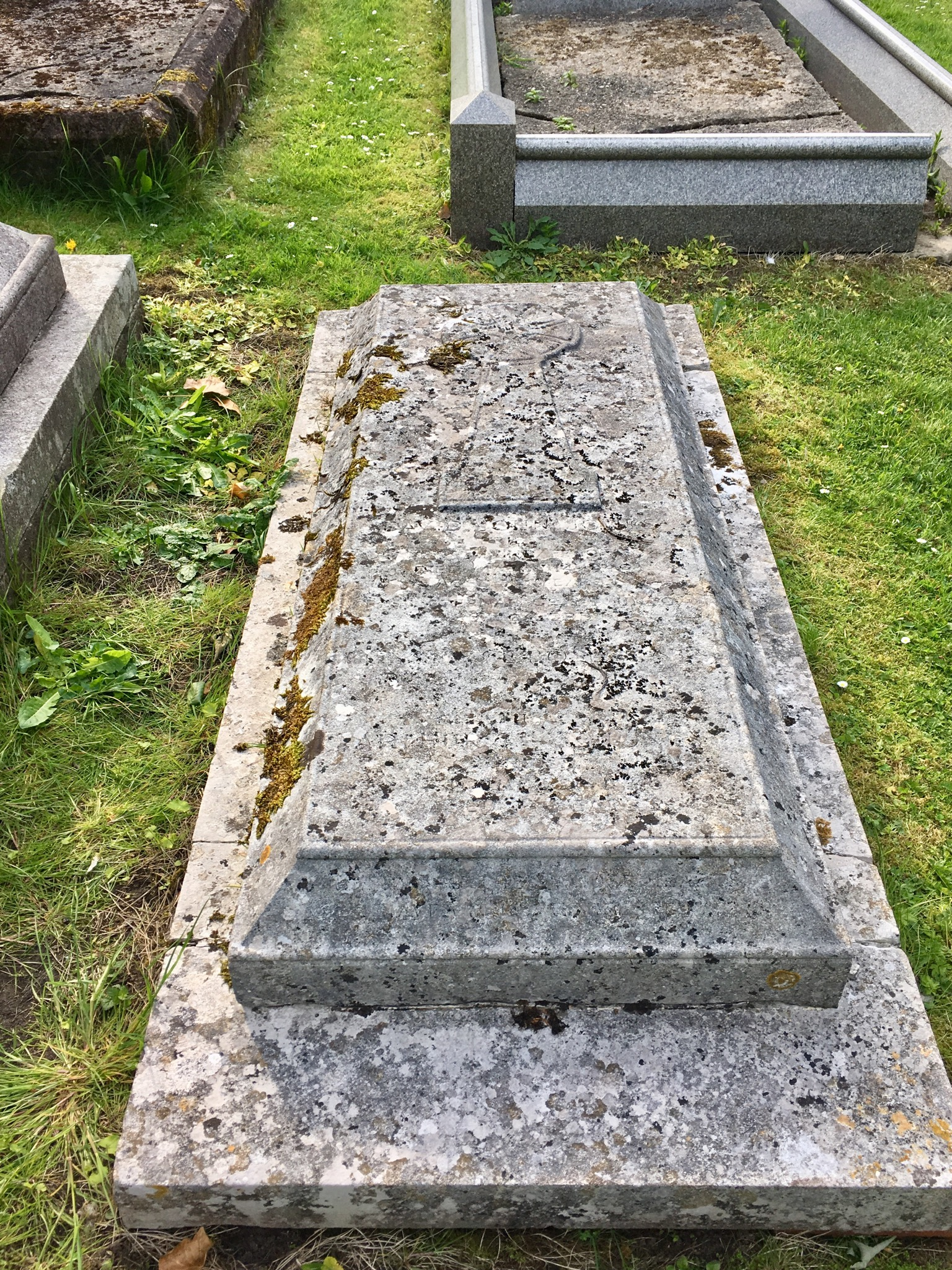
Jones's grave in the churchyard of Llandaff Cathedral in May 2020

== Life ==
Jones was educated at Jesus College, Oxford, obtaining a third-class degree in theology in 1893. He then studied for the priesthood at St Michael's College, in Aberdare, south Wales, and was ordained in 1894, becoming curate in Llanelli. In 1897, he returned to St Michael's College as chaplain, becoming vicar of St Theodore's Port Talbot in 1901, then vicar of Roath in 1920. He was appointed Dean of Llandaff in 1931, retiring as Dean Emeritus in 1948. He died in Cardiff, aged 78.
