= David Lloyd Davies =

Welsh poet and singer (died 1881)

David Lloyd Davies (died 1881) was a Welsh singer and poet. He began composing poetry at an early age, and a number of englyn-style poems composed when he was 16 were published in Yr Amserau (using the pseudonym "Dewi Einion"). He is known to have competed and won prizes at a number of eisteddfodau, and to have won the chair at the Eisteddfod in Bethesda, Caernarfonshire in 1867 (for an awdl on Tywyllwch ("Darkness")). In the 1850s and 60s he conducted a number of choirs in the Llanfachreth, Llwyn Einion, Rhyd-y-main, and Towyn areas of Merioneth, and is known to have composed a few pieces of his own music around the same time.

He later emigrated to the USA, where he continued to compete and win prizes for poems at eisteddfodau, including Kansas (1870), Utica (1875), and Youngstown (1880), and also wrote novels, such as Ceinwen Morgan neu y Rian Dwylliedig (set in Cwm Hirnant, near his birthplace, and published serially in Y Drych (Utica) in 1870).

He died in 1881 at Oak Hill farm in Waterville, Wisconsin, and was buried in the Ottawa cemetery.
