= 1949 in Wales =

- Centuries: 18th; 19th; 20th; 21st
- Decades: 1920s; 1930s; 1940s; 1950s; 1960s
- See also: List of years in Wales; Timeline of Welsh history 1949 in The United Kingdom Scotland Elsewhere

This article is about the particular significance of the year 1949 to Wales and its people.

== Incumbents ==
- Archbishop of Wales
  - David Prosser, Bishop of St David's (retired)
  - John Morgan, Bishop of Llandaff (elected)
- Archdruid of the National Eisteddfod of Wales – Wil Ifan

== Events ==
- Easter - Urdd Gobaith Cymru holds its first "Celtic camp".
- April - The government decides to establish an Advisory Council for Wales.
- 20 May - Council for Wales and Monmouthshire first meets, with Huw T. Edwards as its first chairman.
  - June - Meteorologist David Brunt is knighted.
- 12 June - Britain's first all-world Muslim conference is held in Cardiff.
- 21 September
  - The first comprehensive school in Wales is opened in Holyhead, Anglesey.
  - A meteorite falls through the roof of the Prince Llewelyn Hotel, Beddgelert.
  - John Morgan is enthroned as Archbishop of Wales.
- 4 November - Cwmbran is designated as the first New Town in Wales under powers of the New Towns Act 1946.
- 26 December - The Gwyn Nicholls memorial gates at Cardiff Arms Park are officially opened.
- date unknown
  - Closure of the granite quarry at Llanbedrog, the last in the town.
  - Sale of Bron-y-garth, Porthmadog, ancestral home of Sir Lewis Casson.
  - Bodnant Garden is donated to the National Trust.
  - Gwynfor Evans is elected to Merionethshire County Council.
  - Jack Jones spends three months in the USA promoting the Moral Re-Armament Movement.

== Arts and literature ==
- May - Dylan and Caitlin Thomas settle at the Boat House, Laugharne.
- Geraint Evans stars in The Marriage of Figaro at Covent Garden.
- Huw Menai is granted a civil list pension.

=== Awards ===
- National Eisteddfod of Wales (held in Dolgellau)
  - National Eisteddfod of Wales: Chair - Roland Jones, "Y Graig"
  - National Eisteddfod of Wales: Crown - John Tudor James, "Meirionnydd"
  - National Eisteddfod of Wales: Prose Medal - withheld

=== New books ===
==== English language ====
- Dannie Abse - After Every Green Thing
- Stan Awbery - Labour's Early Struggles in Swansea
- David James Davies - Towards an Economic Democracy
- Cledwyn Hughes - A Wanderer in North Wales
- Arthur Leach - Charles Norris of Tenby and Waterwynch
- Gordon Macdonald, 1st Baron Macdonald of Gwaenysgor - Newfoundland at the Cross Roads
- Thomas Mardy-Jones - Character, Coal and Corn – the Roots of British Power
- Bertrand Russell - Authority and the Individual
- Gwyn Thomas - All Things Betray Thee

==== Welsh language ====
- Aneirin Talfan Davies - Gwyr Llen
- Richard Davies (Isgarn) - Caniadau Isgarn (posthumously published)
- John Daniel Vernon Lewis - Bydd melys fy myfyrdod: detholiad o lyfr y Salmau
- Kate Roberts - Stryd y Glep
- Louie Myfanwy Thomas
  - as Jane Ann Jones - Y bryniau pell
  - as Ffanni Llwyd - Diwrnod yw ein bywyd (submitted to National Eisteddfod; published 1954)
- William Nantlais Williams - Emynau'r daith

=== Music ===
- Ivor Novello - King's Rhapsody
- Grace Williams - Fantasia on Welsh Nursery Tunes - first recording, made by London Symphony Orchestra conducted by Mansel Thomas (first recording of any work by a female Welsh composer)

== Film ==
- Blue Scar, starring Kenneth Griffith and Rachel Thomas
- The Last Days of Dolwyn, starring Emlyn Williams, Richard Burton and Hugh Griffith
- Yr Etifeddiaeth (The Heritage), documentary by Geoff Charles and John Roberts Williams, depicting traditional ways of life in rural North Wales, with narration by Cynan; the first film to be made in the Welsh language
- The Fruitful Year, a promotional film about Wales, commissioned by the Post Office National Savings
- The Road to Yesterday, travelogue made for troops serving abroad

== Broadcasting ==
- January - Glyn Griffiths writes: "It would be advisable now for Wales to weigh in with its campaign of aggravation and persuasion to get a Welsh Radio Corporation."

== Sport ==
- Football - John Charles joins Leeds United
- Netball - The Welsh team plays its first international matches, against Scotland and England
- Rugby Union
  - 26 March - France beats Wales 5–3 at the Stade Colombes in Paris
  - 26 December - Rhys Gabe officially opens the Gwyn Nicholls Memorial Gates at Cardiff Arms Park.
- Steeplechasing - The first Welsh Grand National to be run at Chepstow Racecourse is won by Dick Francis riding Fighting Line.

== Births ==
- 1 January - Sue Jones-Davies, actress, singer and local politician
- 7 February - Martin Daunton, historian and academic
- 2 March - J. P. R. Williams, rugby player (died 2024)
- 5 March - Mike Gwilym, actor
- 9 March - Neil Hamilton, politician
- 22 March - John Toshack, footballer and football manager
- 14 April - Dennis Bryon, rock drummer (died 2024)
- 22 May
  - Ieuan Wyn Jones AM, politician
  - Derek Quinnell, rugby player
- 5 June - Ken Follett, novelist
- 11 June - Tom Pryce, racing driver (killed in racing accident 1977)
- 14 June - Alan Evans, darts player (died 1999)
- 23 June - Hilary Boyd, novelist
- 16 July - Angharad Rees, actress (died 2012)
- 15 August - Richard Deacon, sculptor and academic
- 25 August (in Oxford) - Martin Amis, novelist
- 24 October - Nick Ainger, politician
- 29 October - Alun Ffred Jones AM, politician
- 18 November - William Graham AM, politician
- 15 December (in Epsom) - Jane Hutt AM, politician
- date unknown
  - Anthony O'Donnell, actor
  - M. J. Trow, writer

== Deaths ==
- 20 January - Artie Moore, wireless operator (born 1887)
- 21 January
  - J. H. Thomas, politician, 72
  - Rowley Thomas, Wales international rugby player, 85
- 7 March - T. Gwynn Jones ("Tir-na-Nog"), poet and journalist, 77
- 20 April - Sir Evan Davies Jones, 1st Baronet, civil engineer and politician, 90
- 21 April - Sir Alfred Thomas Davies, civil servant, 88
- 27 April - Evan Morgan, 2nd Viscount Tredegar, poet and occulist, 55
- 1 May - Horace Lyne, Wales international rugby player and WRU president, 88
- 3 May - David John Tawe Jones, composer, 64
- 8 May - Abel J. Jones, teacher, writer and public servant
- 6 June - Walter E. Rees, Secretary of the Welsh Rugby Union, 86
- 3 July - William McCutcheon, Wales international rugby player, 78/79
- 23 July - John Bodvan Anwyl (Bodfan), lexicographer, 74
- 10 August - William Jones Williams, public servant, 86
- 26 August - Edgar Chappell, sociologist, 70
- 1 September - Dr Teddy Morgan, Welsh international rugby player, 69
- 24 October - T. Rowland Hughes, author, 46
- 9 November - William Dowell, Wales dual code rugby international, 64
- 16 December - George Maitland Lloyd Davies, pacifist politician, 59

== See also ==
- 1949 in Northern Ireland
