= Steve Curtis (boxer) =

Welsh boxer (1948–1994)

Personal information
- Nationality: Welsh
- Born: 26 December 1948 Cardiff, Wales
- Died: 28 October 1994 (aged 45)
- Weight: bantamweight

Boxing career

Boxing record
- Total fights: 7
- Wins: 4
- Win by KO: 0
- Losses: 2
- Draws: 1
- No contests: 0

Steve Curtis (26 December 1948 – 28 October 1994) was a professional bantamweight boxer from Wales. Born in Cardiff, Curtis was notable for becoming the Welsh bantamweight champion in 1969.

== History ==
Curtis began boxing as a youth in his hometown of Cardiff, boxing out of the Roath Youth Athletic Boxing Club. He entered the 1967 Amateur Boxing Association National Championship fighting at flyweight. Curtis reached the final, and on 5 May he beat Victor Bowyer to lift the Amateur title. Curtis followed this up by winning the Welsh ABA flyweight title in 1967 and again in 1968.

Curtis turned professional in 1968 moving up a weight division to bantamweight and joined Benny Jacob's boxing stable. His first professional fight was on the undercard at the National Sporting Club in London against John Kellie. The contest went the full six rounds and was judged a draw. His second fight was just two weeks later in Dublin where he faced Jim Henry. Curtis was stopped in the eighth via technical knockout.

Curtis won his first professional fight on his third attempt, beating Johhny Fitzgerald on a points decision at Coleston Hall in Bristol. He followed this up with a second points win, defeating Irish boxer Sammy Vernon at the National Sporting Club. These results opened up a shot at the vacant Welsh area bantamweight title. His opponent was Glynne Davis, a Llanelli-based southpaw fighter with over 40 bouts behind him. The match, held in Cardiff on 2 July 1969, went the full ten rounds with the decision going to Curtis, making him the new Welsh bantamweight champion. A non-title re-match was arranged against Davis on 29 September, this time held in London. The outcome was the same Curtis winning on points after ten rounds.

His final fight was held in Derby against Nigerian Orizu Obilaso. Curtis suffered a second-round technical knockout defeat and retired soon after.
