= Welsh Air Service =

The Welsh Air Service was the world's first regular passenger helicopter service. The service was started on 1 June 1950 by British European Airways and operated between Cardiff, Wrexham and Liverpool.

Flying from the original Cardiff airport, on the shores of Pengam Moor near Splott the Sikorsky S51 helicopters called at Plas Coch in Wrexham and reached Speke airport in Liverpool within two hours.

The service operated from Monday to Friday and carried up to six passengers. However, passenger numbers were too low to make the service economic and it was terminated in 1951.

== Timetable ==
South-North		North-South	
Cardiff (Pengam)	09:15	Liverpool (Speke)	13:45
Wrexham (Plas Coch)	10:45	Wrexham (Plas Coch)	14:10
Wrexham (Plas Coch)	10:50	Wrexham (Plas Coch)	14:15
Liverpool (Speke)	11:15	Cardiff (Pengam)	14:45

== Fares ==
Route	Single	Return
Cardiff - Wrexham	£3	£5
Cardiff - Liverpool	£3 10s	£5 10s
Wrexham - Liverpool	15s	£1
