= Helena Jones =

British suffragette (1870–1946)

- Born: 14 July 1870; Conwy, Wales
- Died: 4 September 1946 (aged 76); Treorchy, Wales
- Occupations: doctor health trustee

Helena Gertrude Jones (14 July 1870 – 4 September 1946) was a Welsh doctor and suffragette who campaigned for women's vote during the early twentieth century. Although sharing the platform with many notable suffragists, including Emmeline Pankhurst, she broke away from the Women's Social and Political Union, of whom she was a regional organiser, to challenge Pankhurst's decision to curtail the suffrage aims during the First World War.

== Personal history ==
Jones was born in Conwy, the daughter of a solicitor. She entered the Church of England sisterhood at the age of 18. Initially working at a home in Surrey for the female children of convicted parents, she left to study medicine in London in 1895, graduating in 1901. She undertook a posting as a medical officer in a sanatorium before taking a position at Greenwich Infirmary. She later became a Medical Officer for Kings Norton Education Board. Around 1909 she moved to Halifax. By 1916 she had taken up the role as medical officer for health in the Rhondda Valleys. She retired as the medical officer for the Rhondda Valleys in 1935, but subsequently worked as an assistant medical officer at Tetbury in Gloucestershire. She died on 4 September 1946 at Gilnockie, her home in Treorchy, Rhondda.

== Work as a suffragette ==
Jones came to note as a suffragette in 1908 when she shared the stage with Emmeline Pankhurst at a rally held at the Baths Assembly Room in Wolverhampton. In 1910 she then supported Pankhurst on a series of talks, speaking to the public in organised rallies across Wales. Jones most often took on the role of chair during these meetings, though sometimes she too addressed the audience as a speaker. In early August 1910, Jones led a meeting at Caernarvon. On 20 August, Pankhurst joined Jones at Caernarvon to address a meeting. Although well received, Jones showed her strong personality by sharply correcting those in the crowd who attempted to turn the event to their own political slant.

In the summer of 1910, Jones took part in a march on Hyde Park where 20 suffrage societies met to hear over 150 speakers from forty platforms. Jones, as part of the Women's Social and Political Union (WSPU), along with fellow Welsh compatriot Rachel Barrett were two of the principal speakers to address the marchers. In late 1910 Jones took on an administrative role in the WSPU when she accepted the duties of honorary organiser of the Halifax branch after the previous branch head, Annie Williams, moved to Wales. The next year Jones took part in Emmeline Pankhurst's campaign to avoid being recorded as part of the 1911 Census. Whilst living at Rhodesia Avenue in Halifax, her housekeeper recorded her as 'not being present' at the address on the day of the census despite being the head of the household.

After the outbreak of the First World War the WSPU took the stance that their demands for suffrage should be suspended to support the war time efforts. Some members of the WSPU broke away to form the Suffragettes of the WSPU (SWSPU), amongst their number were Jones, who continued to campaign for women's votes, challenging Pankhurst's stance publicly in the letter pages of the Suffragists News Sheet. Writing in September 1916, Jones proclaimed "NOW is the psychological moment for demanding the admission of women to the franchise [because] the political machine during the war may be likened to sealing wax to which heat has been applied: it is in a condition to receive new impressions […] After the war it will harden again, and the old difficulties with party shibboleths will be revived." Never shirking in her views, Jones would later proclaim that Pankhurst had, "depated from her first love and gone over to the enemy."

== Primary sources ==
- Cook, Kay; Evans, Neil (1991). "'The Petty Antics of the Bell-Ringing Boisterous Band'? The Women's Suffrage Movement in Wales, 1890–1918". In John, Angela V. (ed.). Our Mothers' Land, Chapters in Welsh Women's History 1830–1939. Cardiff: University of Wales Press. ISBN 0-7083-1129-6.
- Crawford, Elizabeth (2003). The Women's Suffrage Movement: A Reference Guide 1866–1928. Routledge. ISBN 9781135434021.
- John, Angela V. (1991). "Beyond Paternalism: The Ironmaster's Wife in the Industrial Community". In John, Angela V. (ed.). Our Mothers' Land, Chapters in Welsh Women's History 1830–1939. Cardiff: University of Wales Press. ISBN 0-7083-1129-6.
- Wallace, Ryland (2009). The Women's Suffrage Movement in Wales, 1866–1928. Cardiff: University of Wales Press. ISBN 978-0-708-32173-7.
