= William Davies Thomas =

British academic (1889–1954)

William Davies Thomas (5 August 1889 – 6 March 1954) was a Welsh academic who was a professor at the University of Saskatchewan in Canada and the first Professor of English language and literature at University College, Swansea in Wales.

== Life ==
Thomas was born in Abermule, Montgomeryshire, Wales to William and Hannah Thomas, his father being a blacksmith and postmaster. He attended Newtown County School and the University College of Wales, Aberystwyth, obtaining a first-class degree in English in 1910. He then was a student assistant in Aberystwyth for a year, entering Jesus College, Oxford in 1911 and obtaining a second degree in 1913. He lectured at Trinity College, Toronto in Canada, then served in France during the First World War and became senior Professor of English at the University of Saskatchewan in 1919. He returned to Wales in 1921, as the first Professor of English language and literature at University College, Swansea (which had been founded the previous year). He was vice-principal from 1927 to 1931, and remained in post until his death in 1954. He published little, but was highly respected as a teacher and administrator.
