= John Hughes Morris =

British author and minister (1870–1953)

John Hughes Morris (1870–1953) was a Welsh author and an administrator of Christian missions. He was born in Penrhosllugwy, Anglesey but moved to Liverpool as a young lad. He only received elementary education at Chatsworth School, Liverpool but he had considerable talent, and when he was 22 years of age he came to work at the office of the Foreign Mission in Falkner Street, near the Philharmonic Hall. This mission began in Liverpool in 1840 by the Presbyterian Church of Wales. Morris remained at this office till 1949, a period of 57 years.

== Writing and editing career ==
The missionary, Dr Helen Rowlands of Sylhet said of him "The map of the world (and not only India) was continuously before his eyes at all times". Yet he never visited India but wrote two volumes on the romance of the mission work. The Welsh volume is called Hanes Cenhadaeth Dramor y Methodistiaid Calfinaidd Cymreig published at Caernarfon in 1907.

He edited two magazines which have been discontinued. He edited Cenhadwr (Missionary) from its inception in 1922 till his retirement in 1949, and it retained its high standard throughout the years giving the readers an idea of the activities of missionaries in the Khasi Hills, Lushai Hills and those who laboured on the plains of Sylhet. He also edited the sister magazine for the English speaking Welsh Presbyterians. The title of this magazine was Glad Tidings.

Morris also wrote The Story of our Foreign Mission (1930), which may be considered the definitive source on the Welsh Calvinistic Missions to:

- The Serampore Mission
- The Khasi Hills 1842 - 1930
- The Plains of Sylhet and Cachar
- The Lushai Hills
- The Breton Mission

In addition to these detailed accounts of the five mission fields listed above there is a half page entry in his book relating to the Mission to the Jews that inaugurated in 1846 when the Rev. John Mills of Llandidloes was appointed to work among the Jews in London. The first Jewish convert was a man named Henry Wolf and baptised in 1851 at Rose Place Chapel, Liverpool. Rev. Mills' work ended in 1859 but there ensued later, a number of conversions in London and from other places, to the Christian faith.

== Later life ==
Ordained as a Minister with the Presbyterian Church of Wales in 1901 he never accepted a call but dedicated himself as an administrator and a preacher on Sundays. He knew how to communicate with children. A bachelor, he was looked after by his spinster sister and both attended Edge Lane Welsh Chapel. Through his long involvement and his style as a writer he was asked to prepare a two volume History of Liverpool and District Welsh Calvinistic Methodism. These were published in 1929 and 1932 and they provide an overview of the coming of the Welsh to Merseyside from 1787 onwards.
