= Jacob Youde William Lloyd =

Jacob Youde William Lloyd (1816–1887) was an English Anglican cleric, Catholic convert, antiquarian and genealogist. To 1857 his name was Jacob Youde William Hinde.

== Life ==
He was the eldest son of Jacob William Hinde, of Ulverstone, Lancashire, and then of Langham Hall, Essex, and his wife Harriet, younger daughter of the Rev. Thomas Youde of Clochfaen, Llangurig, in Montgomeryshire, (also Plas Madog, Denbighshire, and Rowley's Mansion, Shrewsbury). He was educated at Wadham College, Oxford, graduating B.A. in 1839 (M.A. 1874).

Ordained deacon in 1839, Hinde became curate of Llandinam, then in Montgomeryshire. Experiencing a conversion to Roman Catholicism, he served in the Pontifical Zouaves. Pope Pius IX conferred on him the knighthood of the order of St Gregory; he was also a knight of the Saviour of Greece.

On the death of his unmarried aunt Julia Elizabeth Youde in 1857, Hinde succeeded to the estates at Clochfaen and Plas Madog, and assumed instead the surname Lloyd. Around 1875, he stopped using his papal title, and in time ceased to be a Catholic believer. He restored the parish church of Llangurig, at a cost of £10,000. The work was carried out to the designs of Sir George Gilbert Scott and Arthur Baker.

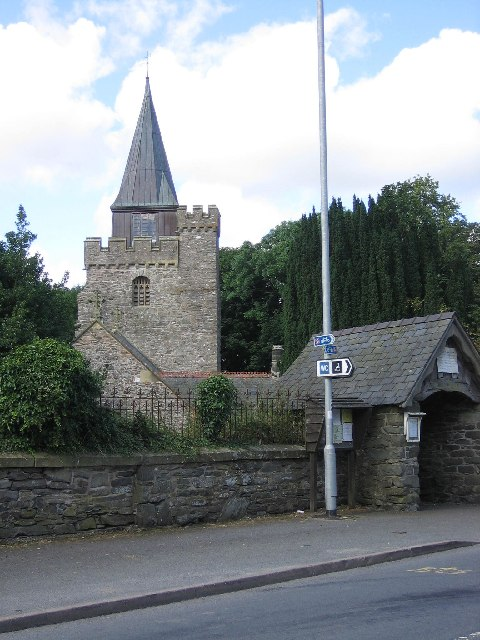
Llangurig church, restored in 1877–8 with the support of Jacob Lloyd

Lloyd died at Ventnor, Isle of Wight, on 14 October 1887.

== Works ==
Lloyd was a student of Welsh antiquities, and wrote genealogical works. His major publication was The History of the Princes, the Lords Marcher, and the ancient Nobility of Powys Fadog, the ancient Lords of Arwystli, Cedewen, and Meirionydd, and many of the Descendants of the fifteen Noble Tribes of Gwynedd, 6 vols. London, 1881–1887.

== Notes ==
Attribution

This article incorporates text from a publication now in the public domain: Lee, Sidney, ed. (1893). "Lloyd, Jacob Youde William". Dictionary of National Biography. Vol. 33. London: Smith, Elder & Co.
