= Alun Davies (biologist) =

Welsh biologist (born 1955)

Professor Alun Davies FRS FRSE FLSW FMedSci

Distinguished Research Professor, School of Biosciences, Cardiff University
- In office 2004–2019

Personal details
- Born: Alun Millward Davies; 2 August 1955 (age 70)

Alun Millward Davies (born 2 August 1955) is a Welsh biologist, Distinguished Research Professor, School of Biosciences, Cardiff University, since 2004.

He was elected a Fellow of the Academy of Medical Sciences in 2010 and of the Learned Society of Wales in 2011.
