= Lewis Davies (writer) =

Lewis Davies (18 May 1863 – 18 May 1951) was a Welsh writer and schoolmaster. He was from the Hirwaun area of Aberdare, Glamorgan (now Rhondda Cynon Taf), where his father worked as a refiner at Crawshay Ironworks. He attended Penderyn Elementary School and, when old enough, became a pupil teacher before winning a scholarship to Bangor Normal College, which he attended from 1881 to 1882. When he returned to Hirwaun, he took up the position of headmaster of the local school (from 1884 to 1886), and he then became headmaster of Cymmer School in the Afan Valley, remaining there until he retired in 1926.

His writings include contributions to a number of local and national newspapers in South Wales, including to Y Brython under the pseudonym "Eryr Craig y Llyn", the Radnorshire volume in Cambridge University Press's "County Series" (1912), Outlines of the History of the Afan Districts (1914), Ystorïau Siluria (1921), Bargodion Hanes (1924), four adventure novels (Daff Owen, Lewsyn yr Heliwr, Y Geilwad Bach and Wat Emwnt) and also musical compositions such as the hymn-tune "Cymer".

He died in May 1951 and was buried in Cymer Afan Cemetery. A commemorative plaque to him is displayed in Hebron Chapel.

Some of the papers of Lewis Davies and his son, Gwyn Lewis Davies ('Ap Lewsyn'), are in Cardiff University Library's Special Collections and Archives.

He should not be confused with Lewis Davies ('Lewis Glyn Cynon'; 1866-1953) of Merthyr Vale.
