= Robert Dewi Williams =

Welsh writer (1870–1955)

Robert Dewi Williams (29 December 1870 – 25 January 1955) was a Welsh schoolteacher, Presbyterian minister and author.

== Life ==
Williams was born on 29 December 1870 at Llwyn-du Isaf in Pandy Tudur in what was then the county of Denbighshire. He went to school in Blaenau Llangernyw followed by a couple of months at the school in Llanfair Talhaearn before going to school in Llandudno and in Bala – he began to preach when attending the last of these. He was then a student at the University College of Wales, Aberystwyth and Jesus College, Oxford before being ordained as a Presbyterian minister in 1900. He was the minister of Cesarea chapel in Llandwrog from 1898 to 1904, then the minister of Jerusalem chapel in Penmaenmawr from 1904 to 1917. He was appointed the headmaster of the school in Clynnog Fawr in 1917, remaining headmaster when the school moved to Clwyd College, Rhyl. Williams retired in 1939 and lived in Rhuddlan until his death on 25 January 1955, serving as Moderator of the North Wales Association of the Presbyterian Church from 1950 onwards.

== Works ==
In addition to his skills as a preacher and teacher, Williams was a highly regarded writer. He wrote a long short-story, Y Clawdd terfyn, which was published in the first edition of the literary journal Y Beirniad published by John Morris-Jones, Williams being regarded the pioneer of this story form in Welsh. Other writings included contributions to periodicals, some of which were collected under the title Dyddiau mawr mebyd (1973). The National Library of Wales holds various papers of Williams in its archive: some unpublished stories, as well as scrapbooks, drawings, cartoons and family photographs.
