= Kim Davies =

Welsh cricketer

Kim Davies (born Morean Kimsley Davies; 13 October 1954) was a Welsh cricketer. He was a left-handed batsman and wicket-keeper who played for Glamorgan. He was born in Clydach.

Davies, who played club cricket for Clydach and who represented Aberavon RFC in rugby, made his first-class cricketing debut during the 1975 season, against Cambridge University. He scored 12 runs in the only innings in which he batted during the match, and took one catch and one stumping.

Davies' second and final first-class appearance came against Oxford University the following season. Davies scored 2 not out in the only innings in which he batted in the match, and took a catch and a stumping.
