= Elizabeth Lloyd Jones =

Welsh scholar (1889–1952)

Elizabeth Lloyd Jones (née Elizabeth Jane Lloyd; 28 April 1889 – 14 May 1952) was a Welsh scholar.

== Biography ==
She was born Elizabeth Jane Lloyd on 28 April 1889 in Llanilar, Ceredigion, the only child of timber merchant John Lloyd, and his wife Elizabeth (née Edwards). She was first educated at Aberystwyth County School and later went to Aberystwyth University where she graduated with first class honours in Welsh in 1911, becoming the first woman to obtain such a degree from the university. She was awarded a Fellowship by the University and studied mostly in libraries situated in London and Oxford for a further three years. In London, she and her close friend, the composer Morfydd Llwyn Owen, were assisted by Liberal politician Herbert Lewis and his wife Ruth.

Jones later received a prize and medal at the National Eisteddfod of Wales, held in Wrexham, for an essay on the Eisdeddfod's history in 1912. She gained a master's degree for a thesis on the Eisteddfod the following year. In 1916 she was appointed to a post at Bangor Normal College as a lecturer in English and Welsh.

Jones met E. Louis Jones, a solicitor from Llanfyllin and the son of Dr Richard Jones; they were married the following year and had four children, two of which died in infancy. Alongside Professor Henry Lewis she published Mynegai i farddoniaeth y llawysgrifau, an index to manuscript poetry, in 1928. Jones died on 14 May 1952 in Wrexham and was buried in Llanfyllin.
