= Herbert Millingchamp Vaughan =

Herbert Millingchamp Vaughan (27 July 1870 – 31 July 1948) was a Welsh author, historian, and bibliographer.

H. M. Vaughan was born in Penmorfa, Cardiganshire. After education at Clifton College, he matriculated at Keble College, Oxford, where he graduated M.A. Family wealth enabled him to spend his life in authorship and the study of history and literature. From 1899 to 1910 he lived in Italy, mostly in Naples and Florence, and wrote on Italian history and topography and also wrote his first book The Last of the Royal Stuarts (1906), a biography of Henry Benedict Stuart, Cardinal Duke of York. In 1912–1913 Vaughan travelled in Australia and wrote a book An Australasian Wander Year (1914). In 1916 he was appointed High Sheriff of Cardiganshire. During WWI he lived at Plas Llangoedmor, served on committees supporting the British war effort, and wrote two novels in the genre of fantasy or science fantasy: Meleager: A Fantasy (1916) and The Dial of Ahaz (1917). Meleager (1916) concerns a eugenic dystopia.

The Dial of Ahaz (1917) posits a universe full of versions of Earth, each of which varies imperceptibly from all the others; those who wish to relive their lives need only travel to another Earth, though for only a limited time. The story is mostly set on a second Earth indistinguishable from ours.

In 1924 he went to live at Tenby and wrote The South Wales Squires (1926). He contributed to the West Wales Historical Records: The Annual Magazine of the Historical Society of West Wales, the Journal of the Welsh Bibliographical Society, Western Mail, Welsh Outlook, some of the London-based journals, and the 1911 Encyclopædia Britannica. Vaughan privately financed the publication of Nepheloccygia: or Letters from Paradise (1929), a collection of stories in the fantasy genre. He died in Tenby, aged 78

Vaughan deserves to be commemorated also for his long years of devoted service (1916-48) to the National Library of Wales, both as member or chairman of some committees, and for his gifts to that institution. He gave to the Library the Oriental manuscripts collected in India by his great-grandfather, Benjamin Millingchamp; on Millingchamp and the MSS. see his ‘Life and Letters of the Venerable Benjamin Millingchamp’ (now N.L.W. MSS. 13915-6) and H. Ethé, N.L.W. Catalogue of Oriental Manuscripts (1916).
