= Arthur Lewis (photographer) =

Welsh photographer

Arthur John Lewis (23 February 1885 – 8 January 1952) was a Welsh photographer and postcard publisher.

Lewis was born in Aberystwyth, the second of four children of David John, a picture framer and photographer, and Mary Lewis. He served an apprenticeship at Williams and Metcalfe's Rheidol Foundry afterwards going to sea as an engineer.

The subjects of Lewis's postcards were local events and scenery. Initially he concentrated on surrounding villages and hamlets, outings and local events rather than the standard views favoured by larger publishing houses. Many of the events such as the quarterly life-boat practice or garden parties would soon be forgotten by those who witnessed them. An exception to this was the visit of a travelling menagerie who chose to advertise their presence by marching their elephants through the town for a swim in the sea. Arthur Lewis photographed the event and the card proved hugely popular. Reprints still sell well at the local museum to this day.

After the death of his father in 1921, Arthur Lewis took over the running of the family drygoods store, known as The Mart, with his two sisters, Eunice and Maggie. He subsequently became known locally in Welsh as Lewis Y Mart (Lewis the Mart). His elder brother kept the picture-framing element of the business on the other side of the street.

Arthur Lewis was a keen local historian, active member of Tabernacle Chapel, superintendent of Trefechan Sunday School and keen sea fisherman. In March 1933 the premises were sold to the Aberystwyth & District Co-operative Society and the family business moved to a smaller shop in nearby North Parade.

During the Second World War, Arthur Lewis served as Chief Coastguard and devoted little time to photography. He died in 1952 whilst on holiday in Liverpool. Subsequently, more than two thousand of his glass negatives were donated to the National Library of Wales.
