= William Henry Prosser =

Welsh-born schoolmaster and cricketer

William Henry Prosser (16 July 1870 – 30 June 1952) was a Welsh-born schoolmaster and a cricketer who played in a single first-class cricket match for Cambridge University in 1893. He was born at Devauden, Monmouthshire and died at Heacham, Norfolk.

The son of the rector of Devauden, Prosser was educated at Selwyn College, Cambridge. From 1891 to 1895 he played occasional minor cricket for Monmouthshire as a lower-order batsman and a right-arm fast-medium bowler. But his only appearance in first-class cricket at Cambridge was in a 12-a-side match against the Gentlemen of England; he batted at No 12 in his only innings and failed to score, and he bowled 10 overs and failed to take a wicket.

Prosser graduated from Cambridge University with a Bachelor of Arts degree in 1893. He became a schoolmaster and was headmaster of Snettisham Grange Preparatory School in Norfolk.
