= 1953 in Wales =

- Centuries: 18th; 19th; 20th; 21st
- Decades: 1930s; 1940s; 1950s; 1960s; 1970s
- See also: List of years in Wales; Timeline of Welsh history 1953 in The United Kingdom Scotland Elsewhere

This article is about the particular significance of the year 1953 to Wales and its people.

== Incumbents ==
- Archbishop of Wales – John Morgan, Bishop of Llandaff
- Archdruid of the National Eisteddfod of Wales
  - Cynan (outgoing)
  - Dyfnallt (incoming)

== Events ==
The Royal Badge of Wales with its 1953 augmentation of honour

- 7 March – A "Saint David's Day" pageant is held by the London Welsh Association in the streets of London.
- 11 March – The Royal Badge of Wales is granted an augmentation of honour including the motto Y Ddraig goch ddyry cychwyn ("The red dragon inspires action").
- 1 June – In the Queen's Coronation Honours List, Victoria Cross recipient Ted Chapman is awarded the British Empire Medal.
- 9 July – Elizabeth II makes her first visit to Wales since her 2 June Coronation.
- 10 July – The royal tour of Wales concludes with a ceremony at Caernarfon Castle and visits to the National Eisteddfod site at Rhyl, Wrexham and the Llangollen International Musical Eisteddfod.
- 2 December – Llandudno experiences unusually warm weather as a result of the "foehn effect".
- date unknown
  - The Royal College of General Practitioners is established in Wales.
  - Goronwy Rees becomes Principal of the University of Wales, Aberystwyth.
  - Grismond Picton Philipps is knighted.

== Arts and literature ==
- July 6 – Dorothy Squires marries Roger Moore in the United States.
- date unknown
  - Thomas Parry (later Sir Thomas) becomes head of the National Library of Wales.
  - Waldo Williams leaves the Baptist denomination and becomes a Quaker.
  - Robert Frank photographs a Glamorgan mining village for U.S.Camera.
  - Susan Williams-Ellis joins her father, Sir Clough Williams-Ellis, in his work on the village of Portmeirion.

=== Awards ===
- Emyr Humphreys wins the Somerset Maugham Prize for Hear and Forgive.
- National Eisteddfod of Wales (held in Rhyl)
- National Eisteddfod of Wales: Chair – E. Llwyd Williams, "Y Ffordd"
- National Eisteddfod of Wales: Crown – Dilys Cadwaladr, "Y Llen"
- National Eisteddfod of Wales: Prose Medal – withheld

=== New books ===
==== English language ====
- Jack Jones – Time and the Business
- Bertrand Russell – Satan in the Suburbs and Other Stories

==== Welsh language ====
- Islwyn Ffowc Elis
  - Cysgod y Cryman
  - Ffenestri Tua'r Gwyll
- David John Williams – Hen dŷ ffarm

=== Music ===
- 8 June – Geraint Evans appears in the première of Benjamin Britten's Gloriana.

== Film ==
- Rachel Thomas and Clifford Evans co-star in Valley of Song.
- Richard Burton stars in The Robe.
- Rachel Roberts stars in The Limping Man.

== Broadcasting ==
- 6 January – The Broadcasting Council for Wales meets for the first time.
- January – Edward Williamson, Bishop of Swansea and Brecon, broadcasts a lecture on Henry Vaughan on BBC radio.
- 9 December – In the UK Parliament, the Postmaster General, Earl De La Warr, confirms that none of the first independent television stations will be located in Wales.

=== Welsh-language television ===
- 1 March – First broadcast of a television programme entirely in Welsh: a religious service from the Tabernacle Baptist Chapel, Cardiff.
- Teledu i Blant (children's programme)
- Telewele (children's programme)

=== English-language television ===
- The National Eisteddfod of Wales is broadcast on BBC television, with English commentary by Hywel Davies.

== Sport ==
- Archery – The North Wales Archery Society is founded.
- Rugby – In December, Wales defeat New Zealand 13-8 at Cardiff Arms Park.

== Births ==
- 10 February – Jeffrey John, Dean of St Albans
- 15 March - Alan Couch, footballer
- 11 April – Rhodri Glyn Thomas AM, politician
- 12 April – Huw Edwards, Labour politician, MP for Monmouth 1991–1992 and 1997–2005
- 26 April – Andy Secombe, voice actor and fantasy novelist
- 7 July – Eleri Rees, judge
- 11 July – Nigel Rees, footballer
- 20 July – Dave Evans, singer
- 10 August – Gillian Elisa, actress, singer and comedian
- 2 September – Keith Allen, comedian and actor
- 28 October – Phil Dwyer, footballer
- 16 November – Griff Rhys Jones, actor, comedian and television presenter
- Shani Rhys James, Australian-born painter
- Hywel Williams, Plaid Cymru politician, MP for Caernarfon, later Arfon 2001–

== Deaths ==
- 10 January – Howell Elvet Lewis ("Elved"), poet and Archdruid, 92
- 7 March – Jack Williams, Victoria Cross recipient, 66
- 20 March – Fred Parfitt, Wales international rugby player, 83
- 24 March – Mary of Teck, Princess of Wales 1910–1936, queen consort of the United Kingdom 1936–1952, 85
- 6 April – Idris Davies, poet, 48
- 30 April – Sir David Rocyn-Jones, medical practitioner and President of the WRU, 90
- 2 May – Thomas Mardy Rees, author, 81/82
- 23 May – Henry McLaren, 2nd Baron Aberconway, industrialist, horticulturalist and politician, 74
- 5 June – Elizabeth Mary Jones ("Moelona"), novelist, 75
- 18 June – Reg Plummer, Wales and British Lion rugby union player, 64
- 26 August – Rachel Barrett, Welsh editor and suffragette, 77
- 9 November – Dylan Thomas, poet, 39
- 11 November – John Glyn Davies, poet and children's writer, 83
- 26 November – Sir Ivor Atkins, organist and choirmaster, 83
- 27 November – T. F. Powys, Anglo-Welsh writer, 77
- 17 December – David Rees Griffiths, poet, 71

== See also ==
- 1953 in Northern Ireland
