= John Daniel Davies =

Welsh editor and author

John Daniel Davies (12 January 1874 – 9 April 1948) was a Welsh editor and author. He was from the Ponciau area of Denbighshire. He began his career as an apprentice of David Jones, printer, of Rhosymedre. He then worked for a while with Richard Mills who printed the Rhos Herald. Sometime around 1900 he married, and moved to live in the Blaenau Ffestiniog area, where in 1906 he started the periodical Y Rhedegydd. For many years he edited Yr Ymwelydd, the Scottish Baptist periodical. He died in April 1948, and was buried in Bethesda cemetery, Blaenau Ffestiniog.
