= Louie Myfanwy Thomas =

Welsh writer

- Born: Louie Myfanwy Davies; 29 February 1908; Holway, Holywell, Wales
- Died: 25 January 1968 (aged 59); Ruthin, Wales
- Citizenship: United Kingdom
- Occupations: Writer, secretary
- Spouse: Richard Thomas (1952–1964)
- Writing career
- Pen name: Jane Ann Jones, Ffanni Llwyd, Jini Jos
- Years active: 1937–1958

Louie Myfanwy Thomas (29 February 1908 – 25 January 1968) was a Welsh author best known for her work under the pseudonym Jane Ann Jones.

== Early life ==
Louie Myfanwy Davies was born on 29 February 1908 at Primrose Cottage in Holway, Holywell, Flintshire. She was the only child of Walter Owen Davies and his wife Elizabeth Jane Jones. Following her mother's death just under a year after her birth, Louie's grandmother helped to raise her. The family subsequently moved to Yscawen, Rhuddlan, as her father changed careers from a saddler to a grocer. She attended the Church elementary school and afterwards, a secondary school in Rhyl where she earned her Central Welsh Board Senior School Certificate.

She started to work at Denbigh County Council on 17 October 1927 in the education department. She was first employed as a clerk, but would later be the secretary to two of the Directors of Education in the council. She continued to work for the council during her writing career, which she kept secret from her family, friends and colleagues at work.

== Writing career ==
Several of Thomas' works were semi-autobiographical in nature, and often reflected the characters of family and friends. Her first work published under the pen name of Jane Ann Jones was Storïau hen ferch in 1937. Y bryniau pell followed in 1949, and Diwrnod yw ein bywyd in 1954. Plant y Foty was published in 1955, which featured a photograph of Thomas on the inside back cover, despite still using the Jones pen name. Ann a Defi John was the final book published, in 1958. She had to re-write one of her novels after a boyfriend threw the manuscript into a fire.

She also used other pseudonyms for writing competitions, having submitted Diwrnod yw ein bywyd under the name of Ffanni Llwyd for the Dolgellau national eisteddfod novel competition in 1949. As Jini Jos, she won £100 in a novel competition run by the Y Cymro newspaper in 1953 although she was announced as the winner under the name of Jane Ann Jones. Outside of novels and short stories, Thomas also wrote plays for the BBC over the course of 15 years.

== Personal life ==
She married Richard Thomas on 5 April 1952 at Bolton registry office. She did not have children, but Richard brought two daughters from his previous marriage.

== Health and death ==
Thomas gave up work due to her ill health in 1959. Her husband died of lung cancer in 1964; at the same time Thomas' own health was suffering having already declined surgery for her own cancer. She had been unable to visit him in hospital or attend his funeral because she was unwell. She died at Ruthin Hospital, Ruthin, on 25 January 1968.
