= Swansea Festival of Music and the Arts =

The Swansea Festival of Music and the Arts is an annual arts festival that takes place in Swansea, Wales.

The 2008 festival was its 60th anniversary.
