= I. D. Ffraid =

British writer and minister

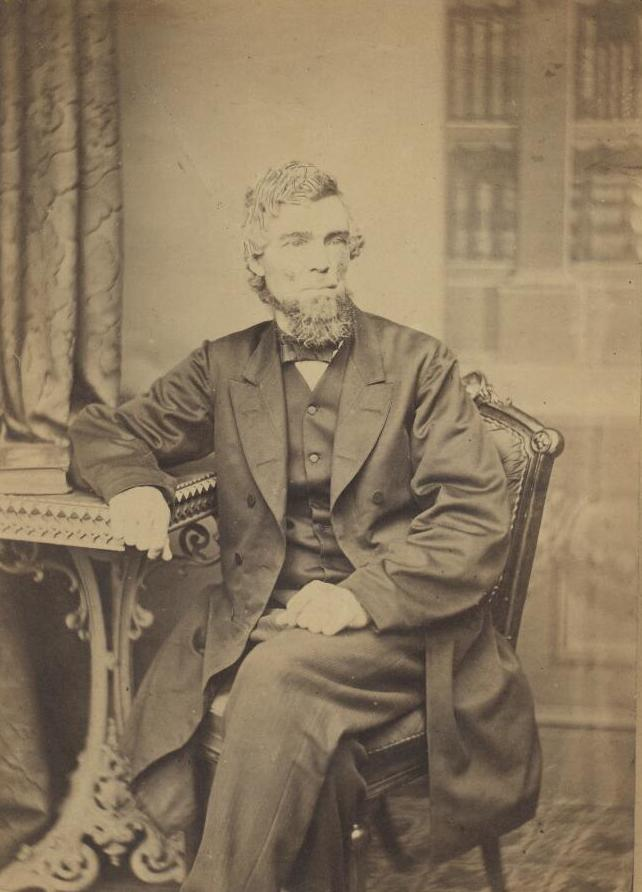
Photograph of John Evans, c.1868

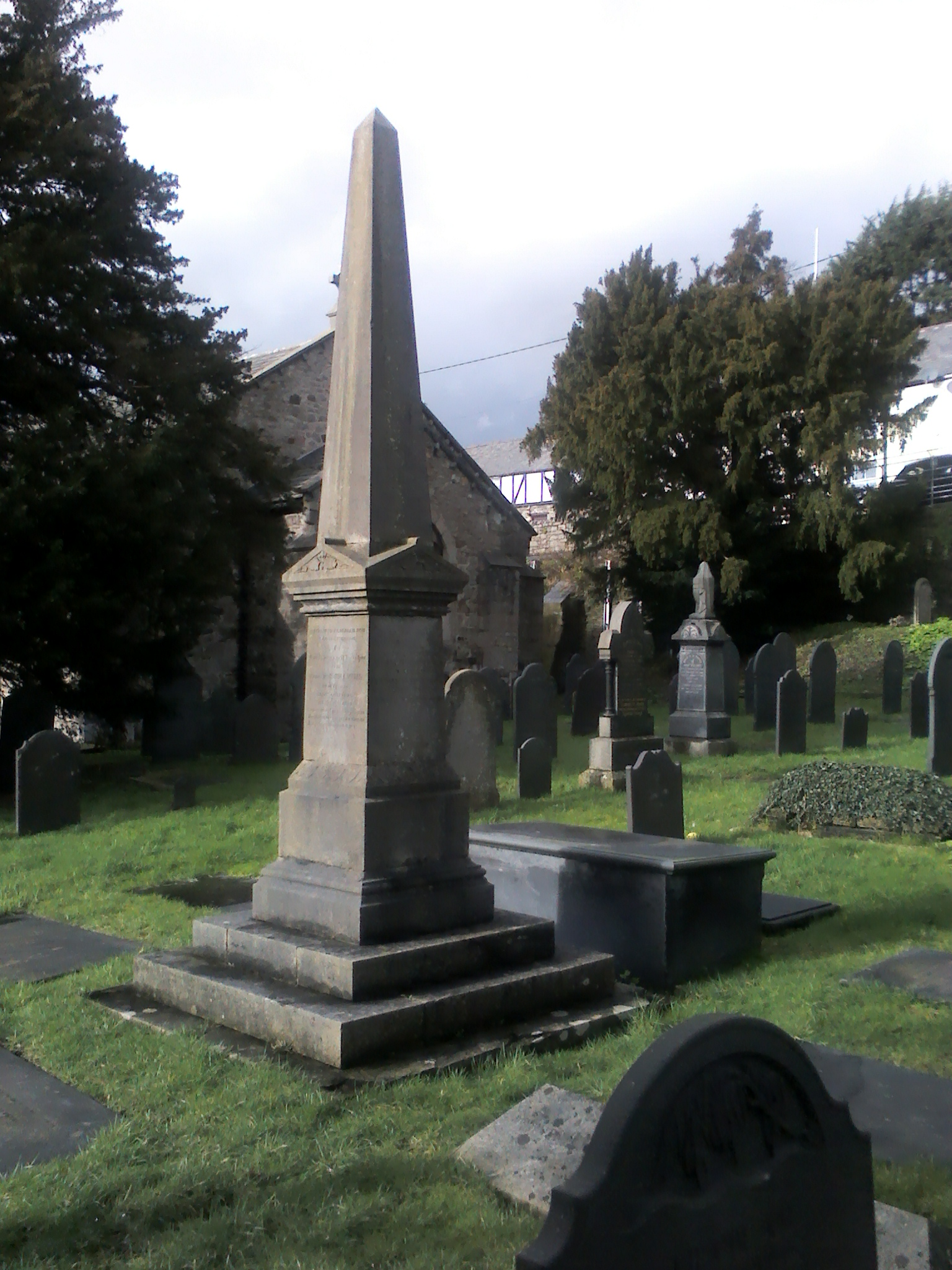
Memorial to I D Ffraid in San Ffraid's churchyard Llansanffraid Glan Conwy

I. D. Ffraid or John Evans (23 July 1814 – 4 March 1875) was a Welsh poet and Calvinistic Methodist minister. He who was born at Ty Mawr, Llansantffraid Glan Conwy, North Wales, on 23 July 1814. At the age of sixteen he published a History of the Jews in the Welsh language, and at twenty-one he wrote Difyrwch Bechgyn Glanau Conwy, a volume of poetry. Much of his later work was contributions of prose and verse to the periodical literature of the day.

Ffraid was, for many years, a regular contributor of a racy letter to the Baner, under the name of Adda Jones. A writer in the Gwyddoniadur (the Welsh Cyclopædia) says that many of the letters remind one of Addison's Essays in their liveliness, wit, and ingenious reasonings. He strikes his opponent till he groans, and at the same time tickles him till he laughs, and the reader is amused and instructed. He translated Edward Young's Night Thoughts and John Milton's Paradise Lost. It is on this last his reputation chiefly rests, and it has received high praise in Dr. Lewis Edwards's Traethodau Llenyddol. Dr. W. O. Pughe had already translated Paradise Lost into Welsh, but the doctor's Welsh was so artificial that it was never much read. Evans died on 4 March 1876, and his remains were interred in the burying-ground of his native parish on 10 March.
