= Victor Erle Nash-Williams =

British archaeologist (1897–1955)

Victor Erle Nash-Williams (21 August 1897 – 15 December 1955) was a noted Welsh archaeologist.

On the death of his father, Albert Henry Williams, his mother, Maude Rosetta (née Nash) Williams, formally adopted the surname "Nash-Williams". Educated at the Lewis School, Pengam, and at the University College in Cardiff, Victor Erle Nash-Williams was appointed Keeper at the National Museum of Wales in succession to Cyril Fox. His work involved the excavation of a Roman villa at Llantwit Major, catalogues of the inscribed and sculptured stones at Caerleon and at Caerwent, a book on Roman Wales, The Roman Frontier in Wales (1954) and his magnum opus, The Early Christian Monuments of Wales (Cardiff, 1950). He was editor of Archaeologia Cambrensis from 1950 to 1955.

His brother, Alvah Harry Nash-Williams, was a well-known author of school Latin textbooks, and his son, Crispin St. John Alvah Nash-Williams, a prominent mathematician.

A monument to his efforts can be seen at the Roman Legionary Museum in Caerleon.
