= Ambrose Bebb =

Welsh-language critic and politician (1894–1955)

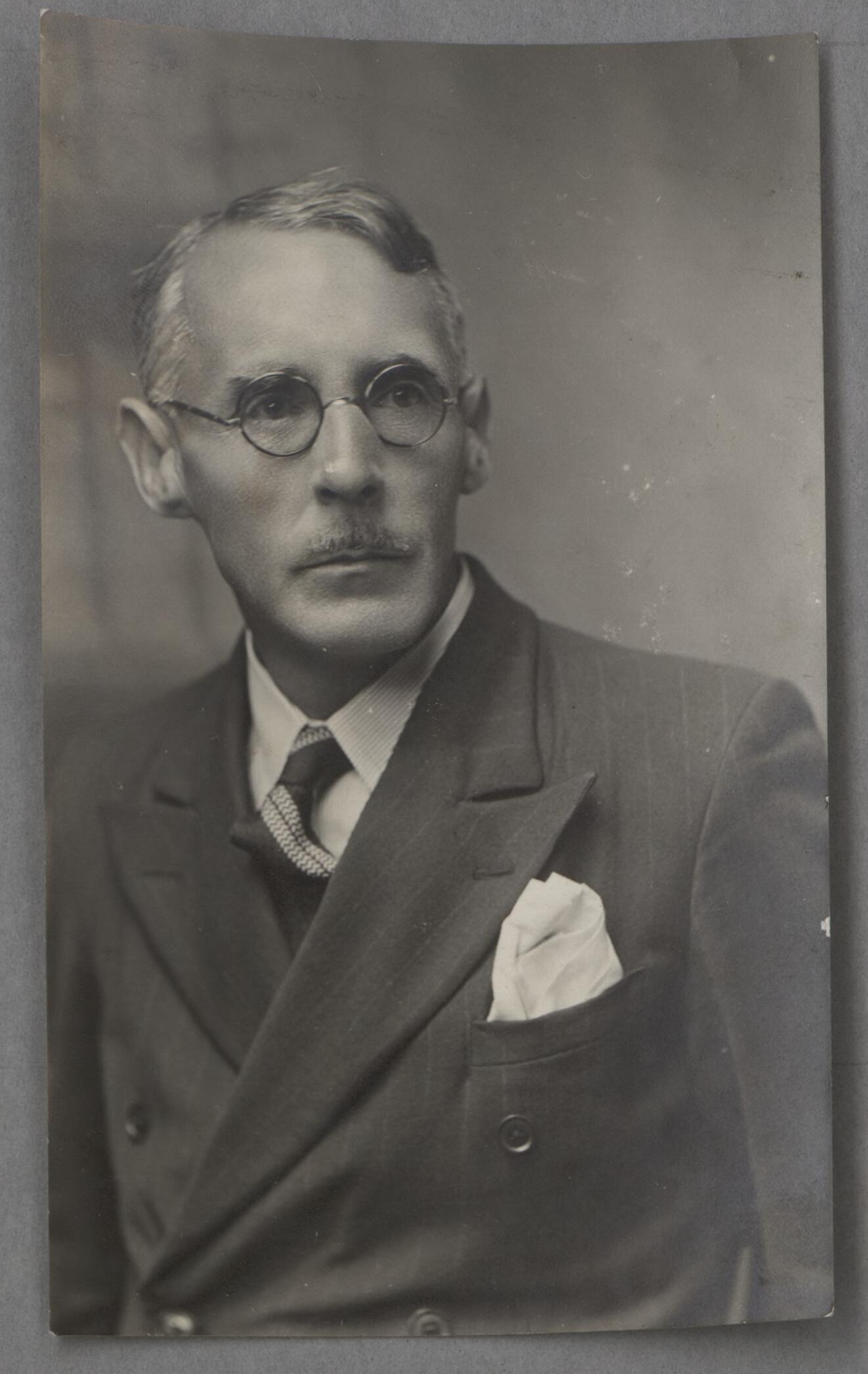
Ambrose Bebb

William Ambrose Bebb (4 July 1894 – 27 April 1955) was a Welsh-language critic, author and politician.

Ambrose Bebb was the son of diarist Edward Hughes Bebb, and the father of noted Welsh rugby international Dewi Bebb. The family came from Cardiganshire.

A co-founder of Plaid Cymru, Bebb took a keen interest in politics and was influenced by Charles Maurras of the Action Française movement. With the outbreak of the Second World War, Bebb became a vocal proponent of the War Effort against Nazi Germany, and considered Germany's total defeat "essential". In the 1945 General Election, Bebb stood for the Plaid Cymru in the seat of Caernarvonshire, and came in third place.

Ambrose Bebb was the grandfather of Conservative Party Member of Parliament (MP) for Aberconwy, Guto Bebb.

== Works ==
- Llydaw (1929)
- Ein Hen Hen Hanes
- Llywodraeth y Cestyll (1934)
- Crwydro'r Cyfandir (1936)
- Y Ddeddf Uno 1536 (1937)
- Cyfnod y Tuduriaid (1939)
- Dydd-lyfr Pythefnos neu Y Ddawns Angau
- Lloffion o Ddyddiadur (1940)
- Y Baradwys Bell (1941)
- Pererindoddau (1941)
- Dyddlyfr 1941
- Gadael Tir
- Dial y Tir (1945)
- Calendr Coch (1946)
- Machlud yr Oesoedd Canol (1951)
- Machlud y Mynachlogydd
- Yr Argyfwng
