= Timeline of British history (1930–1949) =

This article presents a timeline of events in the history of the United Kingdom from 1930 AD until 1949 AD. For a narrative explaining the overall developments, see the related History of the British Isles. For narratives about this time period, see Interwar Britain, United Kingdom home front during World War II, Military History of the United Kingdom during World War II, Post-war Britain (1945–1979), Social history of post-war Britain (1945–1979),

== United Kingdom ==
1930s
1930
1931
1932
1933
1934
1935
1936
1937
1938
1939

1940s
1940
1941
1942
1943
1944
1945
1946
1947
1948
1949

=== England ===
1930s
1930
1931
1932
1933
1934
1935
1936
1937
1938
1939

1940s
1940
1941
1942
1943
1944
1945
1946
1947
1948
1949

=== Scotland ===
1930s
1930
1931
1932
1933
1934
1935
1936
1937
1938
1939

1940s
1940
1941
1942
1943
1944
1945
1946
1947
1948
1949

=== Wales ===
1930s
1930
1931
1932
1933
1934
1935
1936
1937
1938
1939

1940s
1940
1941
1942
1943
1944
1945
1946
1947
1948
1949

== See also ==
- Timeline of British history
- History of England
- History of Northern Ireland
- History of Scotland
- History of Wales
- History of the United Kingdom
