= 1947 in Wales =

- Centuries: 18th; 19th; 20th; 21st
- Decades: 1920s; 1930s; 1940s; 1950s; 1960s
- See also: List of years in Wales; Timeline of Welsh history 1947 in The United Kingdom Scotland Elsewhere

This article is about the particular significance of the year 1947 to Wales and its people.

== Incumbents ==
- Archbishop of Wales – David Prosser, Bishop of St David's
- Archdruid of the National Eisteddfod of Wales
  - Crwys (outgoing)
  - Wil Ifan (incoming)

== Events ==
- 1 January - Nationalisation of the coal mining industry under the new National Coal Board.
- 1 March - Opening of Ysgol Gymraeg Dewi Sant, Llanelli, the first Welsh-medium school.
- 15 March - Cambrian Slate Quarry at Glyn Ceiriog formally notifies closure.
- 2-3 April - A British ship, the 1,580 ton Stancliffe, runs aground off Sharpness loaded with 3,000 tons of timber. Local shipyard engineer, Ivor Langford, manages to cut the vessel in two and sail both parts down to Cardiff Docks. There the two halves are joined together and the ship sails again under the new name of Gripfast.
- 23 April - Wreck of the Samtampa on Sker rocks and loss of the Mumbles life-boat, Edward, Prince of Wales.
- 11 July - Ifan ab Owen Edwards is knighted.
- September - Cardiff Castle is donated by the Marquess of Bute to the city of Cardiff.
- 12 November - Chancellor of the Exchequer Hugh Dalton inadvertently reveals some of the contents of his Budget while on his way to the House of Commons to deliver his speech, effectively finishing his political career.
- 13 December - Royal Naval Air Station Dale, Pembrokeshire, closes.
- Founded in this year are:
  - Age Concern Cymru.
  - BBC Welsh Chorus.
  - Steel Company of Wales.
  - Wales Gas Board.
- Sir Frederick John Alban becomes President of the Society of Incorporated Accountants and Chairman of the Welsh Hospitals Board.
- David Brynmor Anthony is awarded the Médaille de Vermeil de la Reconnaissance Française by the government of France.

== Arts and literature ==
- June 11–15 - First Llangollen International Musical Eisteddfod is held.
- First Cerdd Dant festival is held.
- Caradog Prichard begins writing for The Daily Telegraph.

=== Awards ===
- National Eisteddfod of Wales (held in Colwyn Bay)
- National Eisteddfod of Wales: Chair - John Tudor Jones (John Eilian), "Maelgwn Gwynedd"
- National Eisteddfod of Wales: Crown - Griffith John Roberts, "Glyn y Groes"
- National Eisteddfod of Wales: Prose Medal - withheld

=== New books ===
==== English language ====
- William Ewart Berry - British Newspapers and their Controllers
- Jack Jones - Off to Philadelphia in the Morning
- Michael Gareth Llewelyn - White Wheat
- John Cowper Powys – Obstinate Cymric
- Sir James Frederick Rees - Studies in Welsh history

==== Welsh language ====
- J. Eirian Davies - Awen y Wawr
- William Jones - Adar Rhiannon a Cherddi Eraill
- Elizabeth Watkin-Jones - Y Cwlwm Cêl and Y Dryslwyn

=== Music ===
- David Wynne - Sonata No. 1 for keyboard

== Film ==
- Cymru a Chynilo, A 7-minute public information about Post Office Savings is made in English and Welsh, narrated by Hugh Griffith.

== Broadcasting ==
- Dylan Thomas - The Return Journey

== Sport ==
- Cricket - Wilf Wooller is appointed Captain-Secretary of Glamorgan CCC.
- Rugby Union
  - 20 December - Wales beat Australia 6–0 at the National Stadium, Cardiff.

== Births ==
- 2 February - Frank Hennessy, folk singer and radio presenter
- 5 February - Paul James Wheeler, rugby player
- 11 February - Douglas Davies, theologian
- 22 February - Bleddyn Williams, rugby player (died 2009)
- 12 March - Rod Richards, politician
- 18 March - Roger Kenneth Evans, politician
- 27 March - Craig Defoy, golfer
- 27 April - Pete Ham, musician (died 1975)
- 16 May - Owen Money, born Lynn Mittell, entertainer
- 1 June - Jonathan Pryce, born John Price, actor
- 4 June - Mickey Evans footballer
- 12 July - Gareth Edwards, rugby player
- 17 July(in England) - Queen Camilla (Princess of Wales, 2005–2022)
- 2 August - Iolo Ceredig Jones, chess player
- 30 August - Alwyn Jones, biophysicist
- 9 September - Clive Shell, rugby player (died 2012)
- 24 September(in Loughborough) - Mick Bates AM, politician
- 5 October
  - Dennis Avoth, heavyweight boxer (born in Egypt; died 2023)
  - Phil Carradice, writer and broadcaster
- 16 October
  - Steve Derrett, footballer
  - Terry Griffiths, snooker player
- 29 October - Val Feld, politician (died 2001)
- November - Beverley Humphreys, singer and broadcaster
- 24 November - Paul Griffiths, music critic, fiction writer and librettist
- 5 December - Don Touhig, politician
- unknown date - Sheila Morrow, president of Great Britain Hockey

== Deaths ==
- 10 January - Lillie Goodisson, nurse, late 80s
- 26 February - Percy Phillips OBE, Wales international rugby player and civil servant
- 16 March - Jack Powell, footballer, 86
- 24 March - John Henry Evans, Mormon teacher and writer, 74
- 26 March - Charles Alexander Harris, governor of Newfoundland, 91
- 31 March - John Phillips, Dean of Monmouth, 67 (ordained 1909)
- 15 May - Arthur Harding, Wales international rugby union captain, 68
- 23 May - Richard Griffith (Carneddog), poet and journalist, 85
- 25 May - Samuel Clark, rugby official and international rugby player
- 20 June - Sir John Edward Lloyd, historian, 86
- 30 June - Jerry Shea, Welsh rugby union and rugby league player, 54
- 5 July - Jack Evans, Wales international rugby player, 72
- 7 July
  - James Henry Howard, minister and writer, 70
  - Johnny Basham, boxer, 56
- 23 July - David James Jones, philosopher, 60
- 10 August - David Evan Jones, missionary, 77
- 12 October - William Brace, politician, 82
- 18 October - Alexander Bland, Wales international rugby player, 80
- 16 November - Thomas Griffiths, Australian Army general, 82
- 22 November - James J. Davis, United States politician, 74
- 23 November
  - Sir George Lockwood Morris, industrialist and Welsh international rugby player, 88
  - Matthew W. Davies, musician, 65
- 12 December - William John Evans, musician and composer, 81
- 15 December - Arthur Machen, writer, 74
- 23 December - John Samuel, Wales international rugby player, 80

== See also ==
- 1947 in Northern Ireland
