= 1943 in Wales =

- Centuries: 18th; 19th; 20th; 21st
- Decades: 1920s; 1930s; 1940s; 1950s; 1960s
- See also: List of years in Wales; Timeline of Welsh history 1943 in The United Kingdom Scotland Elsewhere

This article is about the particular significance of the year 1943 to Wales and its people.

== Incumbents ==
- Archbishop of Wales – Charles Green, Bishop of Bangor
- Archdruid of the National Eisteddfod of Wales – Crwys

== Events ==
- 19 January - Three-year-old twins Neil and Jacqueline Coleby die of exposure on the slopes of Caerneddau; despite an extensive search their bodies are not found until 24 January.
- 29 January - In the by-election for the University of Wales parliamentary seat vacated by Ernest Evans, there are three notable candidates. W. J. Gruffydd, a former vice-president of Plaid Cymru who has subsequently joined the Liberal Party, triumphs over Plaid's Saunders Lewis. One of the other candidates is Alun Talfan Davies.
- March - Rocky Marciano is among US servicemen posted to South Wales.
- August - Tenovus Cancer Care is founded in Cardiff as Tenovus, initially funding a wide range of projects in the local area; it becomes the leading cancer charity in Wales.
- 23 October - David Lloyd George marries his long-term mistress and secretary, Frances Stevenson, at Guildford register office.
- Sir Percy Thomas is elected President of the Royal Institute of British Architects for the second time - the second person ever to achieve this.

== Arts and literature ==
- August - Soprano Ceinwen Rowlands gives the first performance of a Welsh translation of Felix Mendelssohn’s Lobgesang at the National Eisteddfod of Wales in Bangor.
- The Welsh National Opera company is founded in Cardiff as an amateur company.
- Dame Laura Knight paints Ruby Loftus Screwing a Breech Ring at the Royal Ordnance Factory, Newport.

=== Awards ===
- National Eisteddfod of Wales (held in Caernarfon)
- National Eisteddfod of Wales: Chair - David Emrys James
- National Eisteddfod of Wales: Crown - Dafydd Owen
- National Eisteddfod of Wales: Prose Medal - withheld

=== New books ===
==== English language ====
- Idris Davies - The Angry Summer: A Poem of 1926
- Margiad Evans - Autobiography
- William Evans (Wil Ifan) - A Quire of Rhymes
- R. T. Jenkins - Orinda
- Eiluned Lewis - The Captain's Wife

==== Welsh language ====
- Rhys Davies - Pobl a Phethau
- Sir Emrys Evans - Ewthaffron: Criton (translation from Plato)
- Alwyn D. Rees - Adfeilion

=== Music ===
- Harry Parr-Davies - The Lisbon Story (musical, opened in the West End 17 June 1943)
- Arwel Hughes - Anatiomaros
- W. S. Gwynn Williams - Tosturi Duw (God's Mercy)

=== Film ===
- Ray Milland stars in Forever and a Day and The Crystal Ball.
- Drama documentary The Silent Village, filmed in 1942 at Cwmgiedd near Ystradgynlais by Humphrey Jennings, is released.

== Broadcasting ==
- 4 September – Wynford Vaughan-Thomas reports from a bomber over Berlin for BBC Radio.

== Births ==
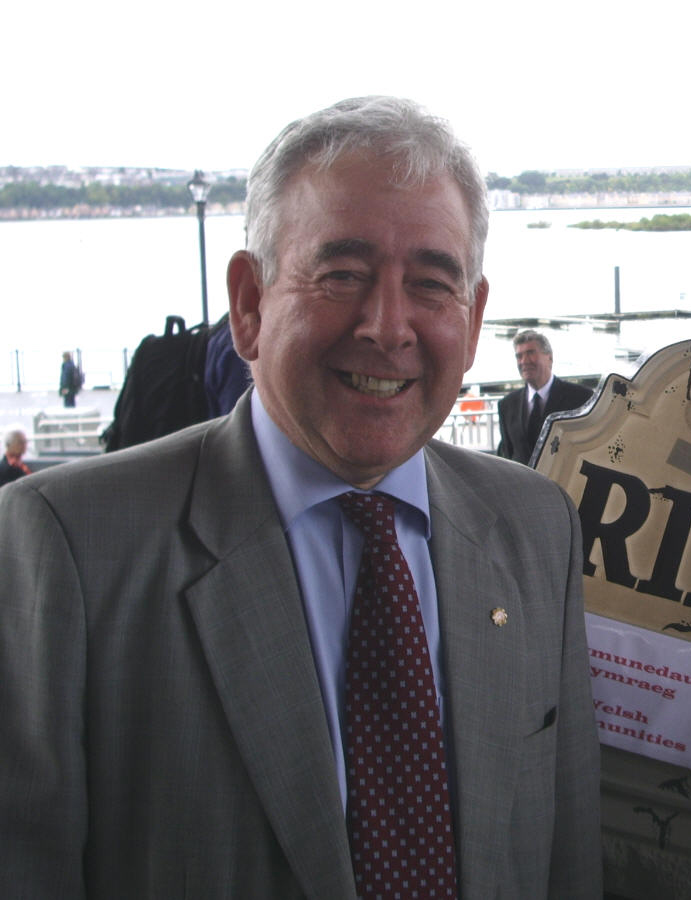
April:Dafydd Wigley

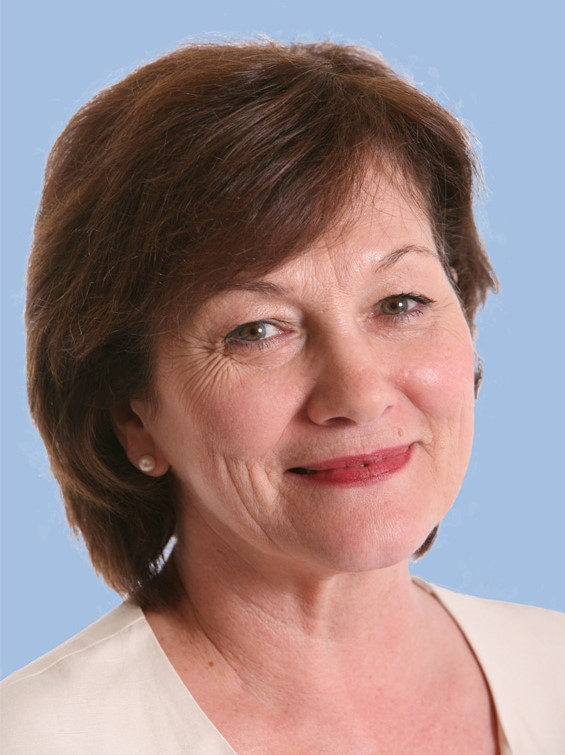
December:Joan Ruddock

- 13 January – Lorna Sage, academic, literary critic and writer (died 2001)
- 1 February – Rosemarie Frankland, beauty queen (died 2000)
- 9 February – Ryland Davies, operatic tenor (died 2023)
- 11 February – Win Griffiths MP, politician
- 28 February – John Davies, bishop of St Asaph
- 3 March (in London) – Aeronwy Thomas, literary figure (died 2009)
- 1 April (in Derby) – Dafydd Wigley MP, politician
- 9 April – Clive Sullivan, rugby league footballer (died 1985)
- 16 April (in Norwich) – Ruth Madoc (née Llewellyn), actress and singer (died 2022)
- 17 April – Elinor Bennett, harpist
- 26 April – Leon Pownall, actor and director (died 2006)
- 27 April
  - David Hughes, footballer
  - Gwyn Prosser MP, politician
- 6 June – Sir Terry Matthews, entrepreneur
- 5 July – Roy Evans, footballer (died 1969)
- 7 July – Robert East, actor
- 19 July – Beth Morris, actress (died 2018)
- 2 August – Alun Michael MP, politician
- 17 August – John Humphrys, radio and TV journalist
- 24 August – Dafydd Iwan, musician and politician
- 10 September – Shân Legge-Bourke, born Elizabeth Shân Bailey, landowner
- 27 September – Max Boyce, entertainer
- 18 October (in London) – Dai Jones, Welsh-language broadcaster (died 2022)
- 15 November – Derec Llwyd Morgan, academic
- 16 November – Val Lloyd AM, politician
- 22 December – Gareth Morgan, organizational theorist
- 28 December – Joan Ruddock MP, politician and campaigner
- 30 December – Geraint Talfan Davies, journalist and executive
- date unknown
  - John Beard, painter
  - Christine Evans, poet
  - Gareth Griffiths, academic

== Deaths ==
- 9 January – William Llewellyn Thomas, Wales international rugby player, 70
- 12 January – Selwyn Biggs, Wales international rugby player and Glamorgan cricketer, 70
- 24 January – Glyndwr Michael, homeless man whose body was used in Operation Mincemeat, 34 (pneumonia)
- 31 January – Sir Robert Armstrong-Jones, physician, 85
- 7 February (in London) – Clara Novello Davies, singer, 71
- 6 March (in Trevelin) – John Daniel Evans, pioneer in Patagonia, 81
- 23 March – Commander John Wallace Linton, VC, 37 (killed in action)
- 28 March – Ben Davies, operatic tenor, 85
- 12 April – Arthur Lloyd James, phonetician, 58 (suicide)
- 17 April – Alice Gray Jones (Ceridwen Peris), author, 90
- 8 September – Dai Lewis, Wales international rugby player, 76
- 15 September – David Samuel, Wales international rugby player
- 24 September – Billy Douglas, Wales international rugby player, 80
- 15 October – Sir Thomas Artemus Jones, judge and Welsh language campaigner, 72
- 29 October – Frank Hancock, Wales international rugby union international, 84
- 17 November – Bertrand Turnbull, Olympic hockey player, 56
- 10 December – Ivor Morgan, Wales international rugby union player, 59
- 27 December – Arthur O'Bree, Glamorgan cricketer, 57 (killed in action)

== See also ==
- 1943 in Northern Ireland
