= 1942 in Wales =

- Centuries: 18th; 19th; 20th; 21st
- Decades: 1920s; 1930s; 1940s; 1950s; 1960s
- See also: List of years in Wales; Timeline of Welsh history 1942 in The United Kingdom Scotland Elsewhere

This article is about the particular significance of the year 1942 to Wales and its people.

== Incumbents ==
- Archbishop of Wales – Charles Green, Bishop of Bangor
- Archdruid of the National Eisteddfod of Wales – Crwys

== Events ==
- 30 January – Scarweather lightvessel in Swansea Bay sinks.
- 28 March – St Nazaire Raid: Lt-Commander Stephen Halden Beattie steers HMS Campbeltown through an enemy attack, winning the Victoria Cross for his courage under fire.
- 13 April – The Cardiff East by-election, caused by the appointment of sitting National Conservative MP, Owen Temple-Morris, as a county court judge is uncontested, under an agreement between the Conservative, Labour and Liberal parties, who are participating in a wartime coalition.
- 25 April – A Nazi German Luftwaffe Junkers Ju 88 crashes into a hill near Builth Wells. Two crew members are killed, the other two taken prisoner.
- 25 May – A breach in the Glamorganshire Canal near Nantgarw is inspected but it is decided not to do any work on it; the canal closes permanently later in the year.
- 10 June – The Llandaff and Barry by-election, caused by the death of the incumbent Conservative MP, Patrick Munro, is won by the Conservative candidate Cyril Lakin. The official Labour Party does not contest the seat.
- 26 June – Rudolf Hess is moved to Maindiff Court Military Hospital and POW Reception Centre near Abergavenny where he will remain for 3 years.
- 17 July – An RAF Lockheed Hudson crashes near Llanfair Dyffryn Clwyd, killing thirteen crew.
- 30 July – A Heinkel He 111 crashes on Pwllheli beach, killing three crew; the survivor is captured.
- 11 August
  - A USAAF Flying Fortress crashes in the Berwyn range, killing six crew.
  - An RAF Wellington bomber crashes into St Brides Bay, killing six Polish crew.
- 18 August – The body of a German pilot is washed ashore at Newton on the South Wales coast. He is buried in the village of Nottage.
- September – A USAAF Lockheed P-38 Lightning fighter aircraft crashes off the coast near Harlech.
- 18 October – An RAF Vickers Wellington bomber, based at RAF Talbenny, Wales, crashes at 16:08 near Ruislip station while on approach to RAF Northolt, England, killing all 15 on board and six on the ground (including four children).
- 22 October – The Welsh Courts Act is passed, allowing the Welsh language to be used in courts of law.
- 31 October – An RAF Wellington collides in mid-air with an RAF Bristol Beaufort near Bangor, killing seven crew.
- 16 November – An RAF Lancaster bomber crashes into Dolwen Hill, Llanerfyl, near Welshpool, killing seven crew.
- December – The South Wales Coal Dust Research Committee produces its first report.
- date unknown
  - A building at M. S. Factory, Valley in Flintshire is adapted for the testing of apparatus for separation of isotopes of uranium as part of the 'Tube Alloys' programme of research into development of nuclear weapons.
  - Caverns at the disused Croesor Quarry are requisitioned by the Ministry of Supply for explosives storage.
  - Houses for munitions workers at Whitchurch, Cardiff, are designed by Geoffrey Jellicoe.
  - During the development of RAF Valley on Anglesey, a hoard of La Tène metalwork is found in Llyn Cerrig Bach.

== Arts and literature ==
=== Awards ===
- National Eisteddfod of Wales (held in Cardigan)
- National Eisteddfod of Wales: Chair - withheld
- National Eisteddfod of Wales: Crown - Herman Jones
- National Eisteddfod of Wales: Prose Medal - withheld

=== New books ===
==== English language ====
- Roland Mathias - Days Enduring
- Leslie Norris - Tongue of Beauty
- John Cowper Powys - Owen Glendower (U.K. publication)
- Hilda Vaughan - The Fair Woman (retelling of "The Lady of Llyn y Fan Fach", later republished as Iron and Gold)

==== Welsh language ====
- D. Gwenallt Jones - Cnoi Cil
- John Gwilym Jones - Y Dewis
- Thomas Jones (T. J.) - Cerrig Milltir

=== Music ===
- Sir Granville Bantock - Two Welsh Melodies and Celtic Symphony

== Film ==
- Neath-born Ray Milland stars in Reap the Wild Wind.

== Broadcasting ==
=== Welsh-language broadcasting ===
- The radio series Caniadaeth y Cysegr is launched by the BBC, and soon proves unexpectedly popular with listeners in other parts of the UK. The hymn-based series celebrates its 75th anniversary in 2017.

== Sport ==
- Football
  - 9 May – Wales defeat England 1-0
  - 24 October – Wales defeat England 2-1

== Births ==
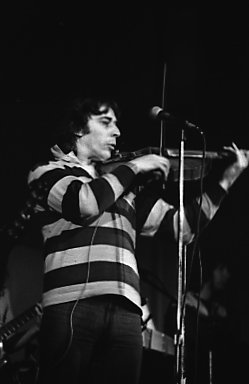
March:John Cale

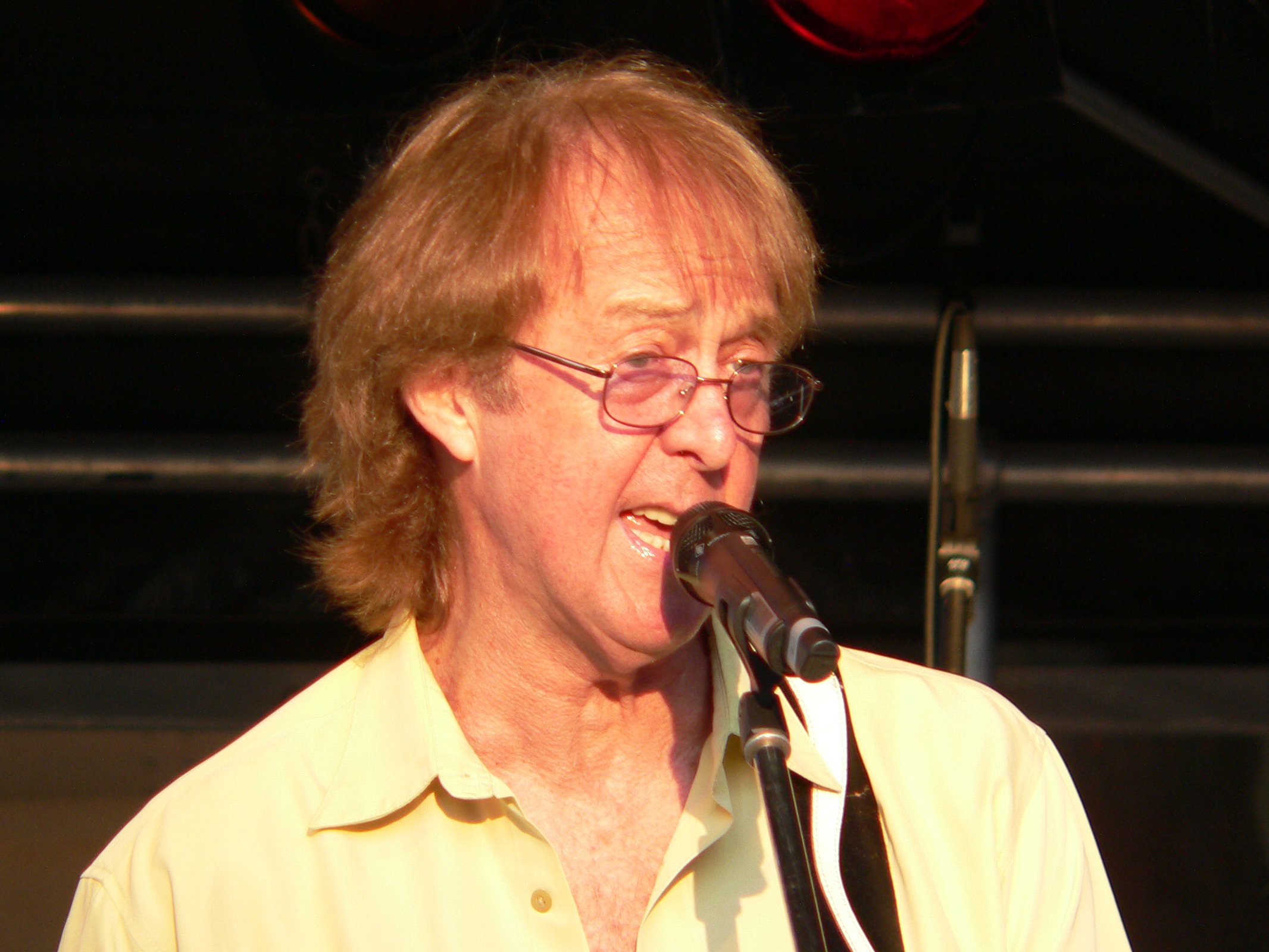
July:Spencer Davis

- 2 January – Billy Hullin, Wales international rugby union player (died 2012)
- 31 January – Euros Lewis, cricketer (died 2014)
- 1 February – Terry Jones, writer, comedic actor and director (died 2020)
- 15 February – Leslie Griffiths, Methodist minister and politician
- 18 February – John Hughes, footballer
- 9 March – John Cale, experimental rock musician
- 13 March
  - John Mantle, dual-code rugby player
  - Meic Stevens, singer-songwriter
- 21 March – Owain Arwel Hughes, orchestral conductor
- 28 March – Neil Kinnock, politician
- 1 April – Karl Francis, film-maker
- 5 April – Peter Greenaway, film-maker
- 1 May – Geoff Evans, rugby union player
- 20 May – Lynn Davies, athlete
- 21 May – David Hunt, Secretary of State for Wales 1990-93
- 25 May – Ron Davies, footballer
- 1 June – Bruce George, politician (died 2020)
- 8 June – Doug Mountjoy, snooker player (died 2021)
- 13 July – Hywel Gwynfryn, television presenter
- 17 July – Spencer Davis, musician
- 18 July – Roger Cecil, painter (died 2015)
- 20 July – Sylvia Heal, politician
- 27 July – Colin Lewis, cyclist
- 25 August – Michael J. Morgan, academic
- 5 September
  - Chris Corbett, rugby player
  - Betty Morgan, lawn bowler
- 16 September
  - Barrie Hole, footballer (died 2019)
  - Jeff Young, rugby player
- 12 September – Delme Thomas, rugby player
- 7 October – Allan Lewis, rugby player
- 24 November – Craig Thomas, thriller writer (died 2011)
- 28 November – Jeffrey Lewis, composer
- 2 December – Brian Evans, footballer (died 2003)
- 4 December – Anthony G. Evans, mechanical engineer (died 2009)

== Deaths ==
- 1 January – John Baldwin Hoystead Meredith, Welsh-Australian soldier and doctor, 77
- 7 January – Edward Arthur Lewis, historian
- 27 January – Tom Barlow, Welsh rugby player and cricketer, 77
- 10 February – Felix Powell, musician, 63
- 15 February – Frank Treharne James, lawyer, 80
- 22 March – Ebenezer Griffith-Jones, academic, 82
- 24 March – Will Osborne, Wales international rugby union player, 66
- 22 April
  - John John Evans, journalist
  - James Morgan Pryse, Welsh-descended American author, publisher, theosophist and founder of the Gnostic Society, 96
- 5 May – David Milwyn Duggan, Welsh-born Canadian politician, 62
- 14 May – Walter Watkins, footballer
- 10 July – Sydney Curnow Vosper, artist, 75
- 22 July – Gilbert Joyce, Bishop of Monmouth, 76
- 4 August – Arthur Vernon Davies
- 6 August – Francis Green, antiquary, 97
- 12 September – Valentine Baker, pilot, 54 (killed in flying accident)
- 24 September – David Walters (Eurof), minister and author
- 14 October – Jem Evans, Wales international rugby union player, 75
- 26 October – Richard Mathias, politician, 79
- 12 November – Hubert Prichard, Glamorgan cricketer, 77
- 7 December – Lionel Beaumont Thomas, businessman, British Army officer and politician, 49
- 22 December – Elias Henry Jones, British Army officer, educationist and author, 59

== See also ==
- 1942 in Northern Ireland
