= 1945 in Wales =

- Centuries: 18th; 19th; 20th; 21st
- Decades: 1920s; 1930s; 1940s; 1950s; 1960s
- See also: List of years in Wales; Timeline of Welsh history 1945 in The United Kingdom England Scotland Elsewhere

This article is about the particular significance of the year 1945 to Wales and its people.

== Incumbents ==
- Archbishop of Wales – David Prosser, Bishop of St David's
- Archdruid of the National Eisteddfod of Wales – Crwys

== Events ==
- 1 January – Three months before his death, former prime minister David Lloyd George is created Earl Lloyd George of Dwyfor and Viscount Gwynedd. He never takes his seat in the House of Lords.
- 18 January – Winds of 113 mph are recorded at St. Ann's Head Lighthouse, Pembrokeshire.
- 7 March – German submarine U-1302 is sunk off St David's Head.
- 10 March – Sixty-seven German prisoners of war tunnel their way out of Island Farm Camp 198 at Bridgend, the biggest escape attempt by German POWs in the UK during the Second World War.
- 15 April – Brigadier Glyn Hughes leads the 11th Armoured Division in the liberation of Bergen-Belsen concentration camp.
- April – German submarines U-242 and U-325 are sunk off The Skerries.
- 15 May – At the Neath by-election, Jock Haston contests the constituency, the first time a Trotskyist candidate had stood in any UK election.
- 5 July – In the United Kingdom general election, which sees a landslide Labour victory across the Great Britain:
  - For the last time in a general election, a candidate in Wales is elected unopposed — Will John, Labour MP for Rhondda West.
  - Ambrose Bebb stands as a Plaid Cymru Parliamentary candidate.
  - Hugh Dalton becomes the new Chancellor of the Exchequer and Aneurin Bevan Minister of Health.
  - W. J. Gruffydd retains the University of Wales seat for the Liberals, the last time it will be contested before abolition.
- 27 July – The cause of an outbreak of typhoid in Aberystwyth is traced to locally made ice cream.
- 2 August – Clement Davies becomes leader of the Liberal Party.
- 12 September – Newspaper publisher Gomer Berry is created Viscount Kemsley.
- 8 October – Rudolf Hess is flown to Nuremberg to stand trial, ending his three-year internment at Maindiff Court Military Hospital, Abergavenny.
- October – Stocks of captured Nazi German bombs filled with Tabun (nerve agent) begin to be transferred to the RAF ammunition store near Llanberis.
- 13 November – Explorer Edward Evans is created Baron Mountevans.
- date unknown
  - Closure of the Benallt manganese mine, near Aberdaron.
  - Broadcaster Wynford Vaughan-Thomas is awarded the Croix de Guerre for his exploits in following the invading troops into France during 1944.
  - Kayser Bondor open an underwear factory at Pentrebach.

== Arts and literature ==
=== Awards ===
- National Eisteddfod of Wales (held in Rhosllanerchrugog)
- National Eisteddfod of Wales: Chair – Tom Parri Jones
- National Eisteddfod of Wales: Crown – withheld
- National Eisteddfod of Wales: Prose Medal – withheld

=== New books ===
- Idris Davies – Tonypandy and other poems
- D. Gwenallt Jones – Detholiad o Ryddiaith Gymraeg R. J. Derfel
- Huw Menai – The Simple Vision

=== Music ===
- National Youth Orchestra of Wales formed, the world's first such organisation.
- Ivor Novello – Perchance to Dream
- Mansel Thomas – "Y Bardd"

== Film ==
- Ray Milland wins an Academy Award for Best Actor for his role in The Lost Weekend.

== Broadcasting ==
- The BBC issues the first Welsh edition of Radio Times.

== Sport ==
- Football – The first post-war match between Wales and England ends in a 1 – 0 victory for Wales.

== Births ==
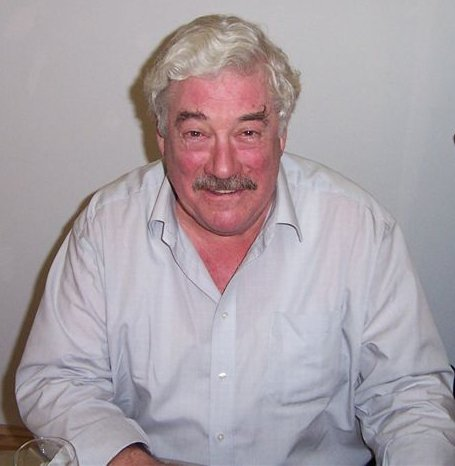
12 Feb: Gareth Thomas

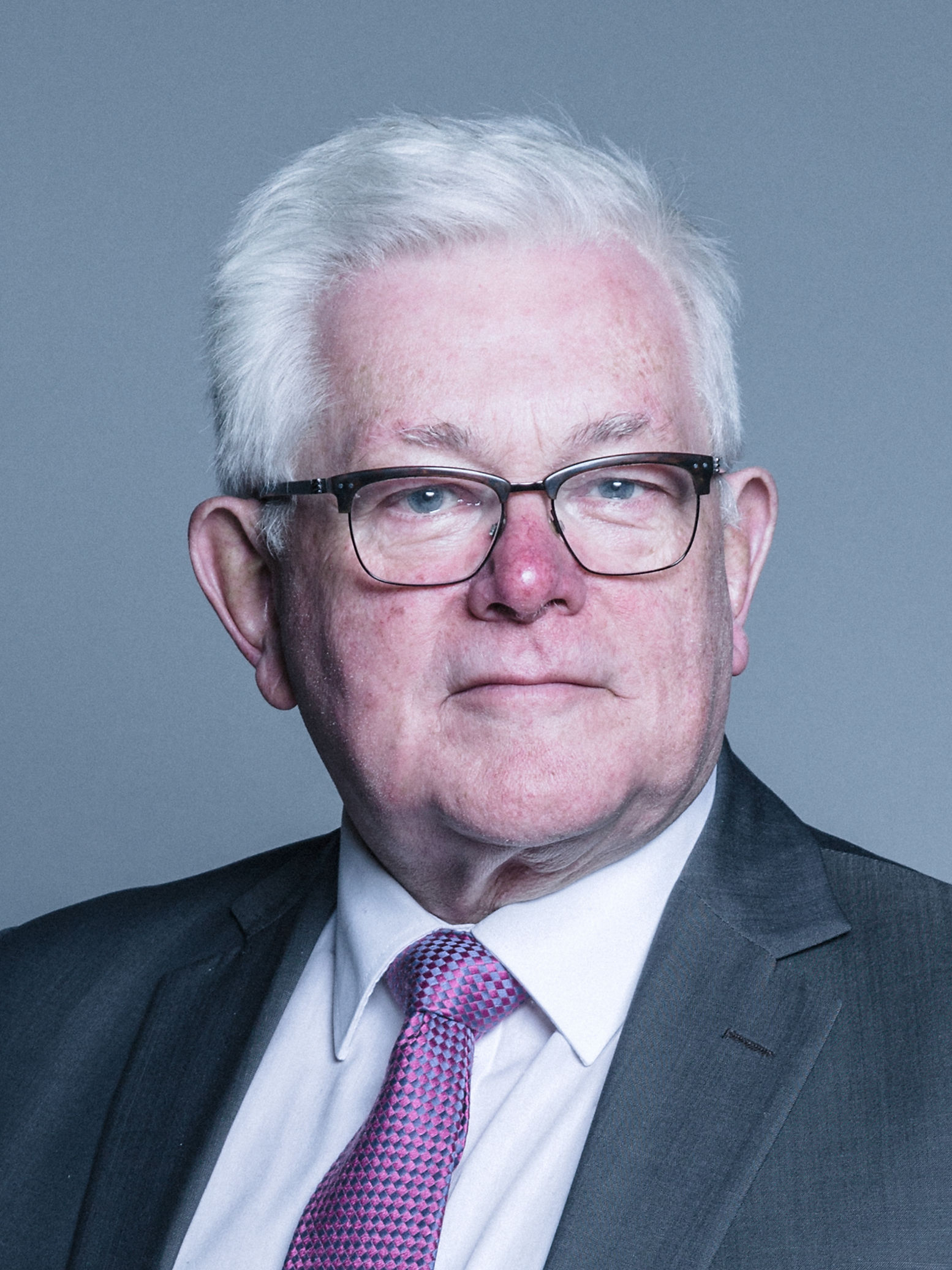
8 May: Mike German

- 6 January – Barry John, rugby player (died 2024)
- 7 February – Gerald Davies, rugby player
- 12 February – Gareth Thomas, actor (died 2016)
- 19 February – Huw Llywelyn Davies, broadcaster
- 3 April – Gary Sprake, footballer (died 2016)
- 7 April – Martyn Lewis, TV journalist
- 2 May – Eddie Avoth, boxing champion
- 8 May – Mike German AM, politician
- 9 May – Malcolm Nash, cricketer (died 2019)
- 15 July – Rachel Lomax, economist
- 13 August – Howard Marks, drug trafficker (died 2016)
- 29 August (in Cromford) – Sue Essex AM, politician
- 7 September – Max Boyce, entertainer
- 15 September – Clive Merrison, actor
- 30 November – Roger Glover, musician
- 21 December – Alan Williams MP, politician
- date unknown – Lyn Evans, physicist

== Deaths ==
- 3 January
  - Edward Peake, Wales international rugby union player, 84
  - Sir William James Thomas, 1st Baronet, industrialist, 77
- 9 January – Dennis O'Neill, murder victim, 12
- 11 January – Caradoc Evans, author, 66
- 16 January – Robert Griffith Berry, Congregationalist minister and writer, 75
- 17 January – Reginald Clarry MP, politician, 62
- 6 February – Edward Prosser Rhys, journalist and poet, 43
- 17 March – Sir Thomas Lewis, cardiologist, 63
- 26 March – David Lloyd George MP, politician, 82
- 12 May (in Brighton) – James Walker, MP for Newport (1929–31), 61 (in a road accident)
- 16 May – Harry Vaughan Watkins, Wales international rugby player, 69
- 11 June – Owen Evans MP, politician, 69
- 14 June – John Hugh Edwards, MP, 76
- 22 June – William Williams, Wales national rugby union player, 78
- 29 July – Cecil Griffiths, athlete, 44 (heart attack)
- 29 September – Evan James Williams, physicist, 42 (cancer)
- 15 November – John Lloyd Williams, botanist, 91
- 21 November – Thomas Rhondda Williams, Congregational minister and politician, 84/5
- 1 December – Tom Graham, Wales international rugby player
- 26 December – George Travers, Wales international rugby union player, 68
- date unknown – Len Davies, footballer

== See also ==
- 1945 in Northern Ireland
