= 1946 in Wales =

- Centuries: 18th; 19th; 20th; 21st
- Decades: 1920s; 1930s; 1940s; 1950s; 1960s
- See also: List of years in Wales; Timeline of Welsh history 1946 in The United Kingdom England Scotland Elsewhere

This article is about the particular significance of the year 1946 to Wales and its people.

== Incumbents ==
- Archbishop of Wales – David Prosser, Bishop of St David's
- Archdruid of the National Eisteddfod of Wales – Crwys

== Events ==
- 12 July – The Coal Industry Nationalisation Act is passed by Parliament.
- August
  - Arthur Horner becomes General Secretary of the National Union of Mineworkers.
  - Stocks of captured Nazi German bombs filled with Tabun (nerve agent) begin to be transferred from Llanberis to open storage at RAF Llandwrog.
- November – The highest ever temperature for this month in the UK is recorded at Prestatyn: 71 °F (21.7 °C).
- December – George Isaacs inaugurates the first Remploy factory, in Bridgend, with the aim of offering work to disabled ex-servicemen.
- 26 December – A serious collapse at Bryn Eglwys slate mine near Abergynolwyn causes its closure.
- A pneumoconiosis research unit is established at Llandough Hospital near Cardiff, in recognition of the damage being caused to miners' health.

== Arts and literature ==
- In the absence of a Prince of Wales, The Princess Elizabeth, heir presumptive to the throne, is admitted to the Gorsedd.

=== Awards ===
- National Eisteddfod of Wales (held in Mountain Ash)
- National Eisteddfod of Wales: Chair – Geraint Bowen
- National Eisteddfod of Wales: Crown – Rhydwen Williams
- National Eisteddfod of Wales: Prose Medal – Dafydd Jenkins

=== New books ===
==== In Welsh ====
- Pennar Davies – Cinio'r Cythraul
- Albert Evans-Jones (Cynan) – Ffarwel Weledig
- Thomas Rowland Hughes – Chwalfa
- John Gwilym Jones – Y Goeden Erin

==== In English ====
- Caradoc Evans – The Earth Gives All and Takes All
- Emyr Humphreys – Little Kingdom
- Dylan Thomas – Deaths and Entrances
- Gwyn Thomas – The Dark Philosophers

=== Music ===
- 15 April – The Welsh National Opera makes its debut, at the Prince of Wales Theatre, Cardiff, with a double bill of Cavalleria rusticana and Pagliacci, with almost all the singers being amateurs.
- Daniel Jones – Scenes from the Mabinogion

== Film ==
- London Town featuring Tessie O'Shea

== Broadcasting ==
- June – The BBC's regional director for Wales tells Welsh MPs that there is "not enough talent... to sustain a full continuous programme".

== Sport ==
- Boxing – Wales stages its first-ever world title fight, in which lightweight Ronnie James is defeated by Ike Williams.

== Births ==
- 10 January – Terry Cobner, rugby player
- 15 January – Roger Davis, cricketer
- 31 January – Bobby Windsor, rugby player
- 20 February – Mike Roberts, Wales and British Lions rugby player
- 21 March – Timothy Dalton, actor
- 2 April – Dai Llewellyn, socialite (died 2009)
- 5 April – Russell Davies, journalist and broadcaster
- 13 April – Della Jones, mezzo-soprano
- 19 May – Androw Bennett, writer
- 6 June – Hywel Francis, politician and historian (died 2021)
- 14 June – Glyn Berry, diplomat
- 6 August – Ron Davies, politician
- 12 August – Andrew McNeillie, poet and literary editor
- 3 October – Richie Morgan, professional footballer and manager
- 18 October – Dafydd Elis-Thomas, politician (died 2025)
- 30 October – Chris Slade, rock drummer
- 26 November – Brian Hibbard, actor and singer (died 2012)
- 27 November – Kim Howells, politician
- 6 December – Martin Moore-Bick, judge
- 9 December – Mervyn Davies, rugby player (died 2012)
- date unknown – Tony Curtis, poet

== Deaths ==
- 8 January – Dion Fortune, writer, 55
- 23 January – William Evans, Wales dual-code international rugby player, 62
- 25 April (in London) – Arthur Jenkins, MP for Pontypool, 64
- 14 March – Reg Thomas, athlete, 39 (air crash)
- 16 April – Jack Jenkins, footballer, 54
- 25 April – Arthur Jenkins, politician, 64
- 25 May – Ernest Rhys ("Mr Everyman"), writer, 86
- 1 June – Arthur Griffith-Boscawen, politician, 80
- 10 June – Humphrey Jones, footballer, 83
- 18 June – Thomas Llewellyn Jones, businessman and politician in Australia, 74
- 4 July – Taffy O'Callaghan, footballer, 39
- 15 July – William Cope, 1st Baron Cope, politician, 75
- 20 July – Richard Thomas Evans, politician, 55/56
- 8 August – Miriam Kate Williams ("Vulcana"), strongwoman, 72
- 12 August – Alfred Augustus Mathews, vicar and Wales international rugby player, 82
- 25 August – Tudor Edwards, thoracic surgeon, 56
- 26 August – Ruth Herbert Lewis, social reformer and collector of Welsh folk songs, 74
- 15 October – David Percy Davies, newspaper editor,
- 4 November – Bill Morris, Wales international rugby player, 77
- 5 November – Thomas Scott-Ellis, 8th Baron Howard de Walden, author and patron of the arts in Wales, 66
- 24 November – Sydney Nicholls, Wales rugby international player, 78
- 6 December – Charles Stanton MP, politician
- date unknown
  - William Egan, footballer, 73 or 74
  - Morris Williams, publisher, husband and collaborator of Kate Roberts, 46
  - Ianto Davies, rugby player, ?48

== See also ==
- 1946 in Northern Ireland
