= Pitsa =

Pitsa may refer to:

- The Pitsa panels, the earliest surviving example of Greek panel painting
- SS Pitsa, a cargo ship which sank in 1967
- Pitsa, the Southern Sotho equivalent to English "pot" or "pan".
- Pizza (Italian: [ˈpittsa])

== See also ==
- Pita
- Pisa
