= Dafydd Jenkins =

Dafydd Jenkins may refer to:

- Dafydd Jenkins (legal scholar) (1911–2012), Welsh barrister, activist, and legal scholar and historian
- Dafydd Jenkins (rugby union) (born 2002), Welsh rugby union player
