= 1944 in Wales =

- Centuries: 18th; 19th; 20th; 21st
- Decades: 1920s; 1930s; 1940s; 1950s; 1960s
- See also: List of years in Wales; Timeline of Welsh history 1944 in The United Kingdom England Scotland Elsewhere

This article is about the particular significance of the year 1944 to Wales and its people.

== Incumbents ==
- Archbishop of Wales
  - Charles Green, Bishop of Bangor (died 7 May)
  - David Prosser, Bishop of St David's (elected)
- Archdruid of the National Eisteddfod of Wales – Crwys

== Events ==
- 22 January - Wynford Vaughan-Thomas reports for the BBC from the Battle of Anzio.
- 23 January - An RAF Halifax bomber crashes in the Elan Valley, killing nine crew.
- 28 March - Cardiff Blitz: Nine people are killed in an air raid on Cardiff.
- 11 April - An RAF Lancaster bomber crashes near Llanwrtyd Wells, killing eight crew.
- 16 August - Lt. Tasker Watkins leads a bayonet charge at Barfour in Normandy, winning the Victoria Cross for his courage.
- 17 October - The first "Welsh Day" debate takes place in the House of Commons (UK).
- 11 November - A US Dakota C-47 with four crew crashes into cliffs above Llyn Dulyn.
- 10 December - American Liberty ship Dan Beard is torpedoed off Strumble Head, resulting in the deaths of 29 crew.
- 20 December - An American B-24 Liberator plane crashes into the sea off Anglesey, killing eight crew.
- Plaid Cymru transfers its head office from Caernarfon to Cardiff.
- Morgan Phillips becomes Secretary of the Labour Party (UK), a position he will hold until 1961.
- Sir Thomas Williams Phillips becomes permanent secretary of the new government ministry created to implement the national insurance system.
- Sir David Brunt is awarded the royal medal of the Royal Society for his work in meteorology.
- Politician Goronwy Owen and naval architect Llewellyn Soulsby are knighted.

== Arts and literature ==
- 2 October - Dylan Thomas is best man at the wedding of his friend and fellow poet Vernon Watkins in London - but fails to turn up.
- BBC commentator Alun Williams marries Perrie Hopkin Morris, daughter of Sir Rhys Hopkin Morris.

=== Awards ===
- National Eisteddfod of Wales (held in Llandybie)
- National Eisteddfod of Wales: Chair - D. Lloyd Jenkins
- National Eisteddfod of Wales: Crown - J. M. Edwards
- National Eisteddfod of Wales: Prose Medal - withheld

=== English language ===
- Rhys Davies – Black Venus
- Fred Hando - The Pleasant Land of Gwent
- Jack Jones - The Man David
- Alun Lewis - The Last Inspection
- Sir Percy Emerson Watkins - A Welshman Remembers
- Sir Ifor Williams - Lectures on early Welsh Poetry

=== Welsh language ===
- Thomas Rowland Hughes - William Jones
- Edward Morgan Humphreys - Ceulan y Llyn Du
- T. H. Parry-Williams - O'r Pedwar Gwynt

=== New drama ===
- James Kitchener Davies - Meini Gwagedd
- Emlyn Williams - The Druid's Rest

=== Music ===
- Harry Parr Davies - Jenny Jones (musical)
- Grace Williams - Sea Sketches

=== Film ===
- The Halfway House, starring Mervyn Johns, Glynis Johns and Rachel Thomas, is set in Wales.

=== Broadcasting ===
- August - Wynford Vaughan-Thomas reports on the liberation of Paris for BBC radio.
- Launch of the Noson Lawen series on BBC radio.

=== Visual arts ===
- Polish-born expressionist painter Josef Herman begins 11 years living and working in Ystradgynlais.

== Sport ==
- Boxing - Syd Worgan beats Tommy Davies for the vacant Welsh featherweight title.
- Football - The first post-war match between Wales and England ends in a 1 - 0 victory for Wales.

== Births ==
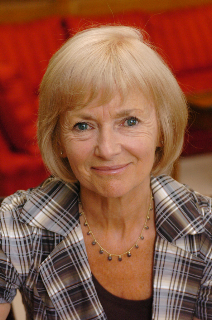
July:Glenys Kinnock

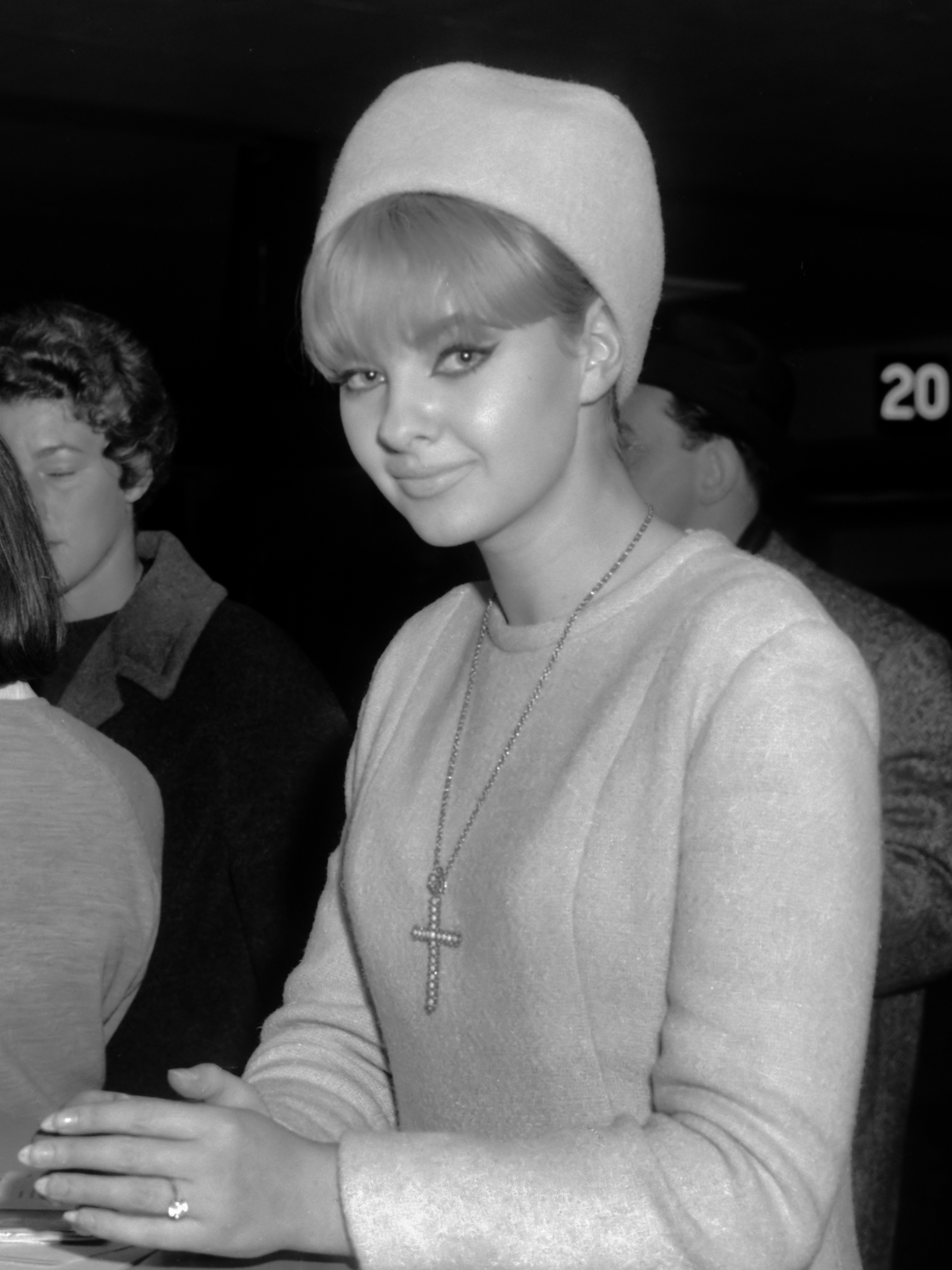
October:Mandy Rice-Davies

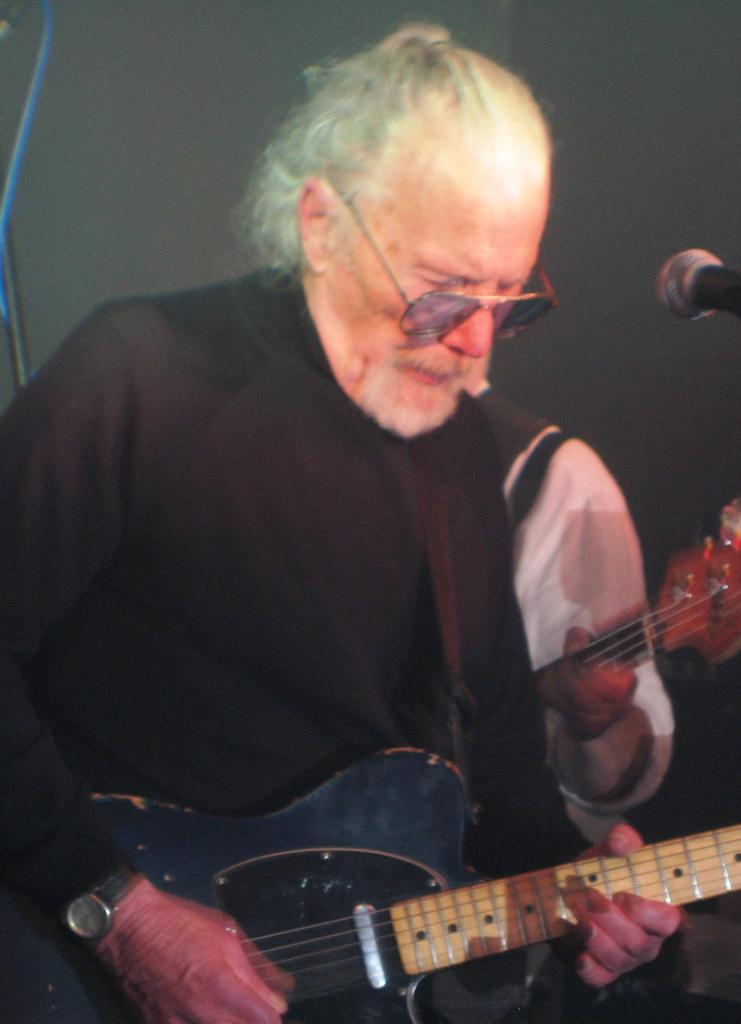
December:Deke Leonard

- 21 January – Peter Rodrigues, footballer
- 26 January – Ken Rees, television journalist
- 17 February – Karl Jenkins, composer
- 1 March – Dai Morgan Evans, English-born archaeologist (died 2017)
- 6 March – Billy Raybould, Wales international rugby player
- 12 March – Tammy Jones, singer
- 24 March
  - Mary Balogh, novelist
  - Steve Jones, biologist
- 31 March – Myfanwy Talog, actress (died 1995)
- 4 April – Ronnie Rees, footballer
- 8 April – Hywel Bennett, actor (died 2017)
- 15 April – Dave Edmunds, rock musician
- 16 April – Llew Smith, politician (died 2021)
- 5 May
  - Roger Rees, actor (died 2015 in the United States)
  - John Rhys-Davies, actor
- 20 May – Kathrin Thomas, magistrate
- 3 June – Dilwyn John, footballer.
- 11 June – Alan Howarth, Baron Howarth of Newport, politician
- 16 June – Brian Protheroe, English-born singer and actor of Welsh parentage
- 7 July – Glenys Kinnock, English-born politician (died 2023)
- 7 July – Angharad Rees, actress (died 2012)
- 31 July
  - Endaf Emlyn, TV presenter, musician and director
  - Betty Williams, politician
- 3 September – John Cooper, serial killer
- 9 October – Desmond Barrit, actor
- 10 October – Eurig Wyn, politician
- 21 October – Mandy Rice-Davies, socialite (died 2014)
- 6 November – Gerallt Lloyd Owen, poet (died 2014)
- 14 November – Eurfyl ap Gwilym, economist and politician
- 29 November – Gareth Wardell, politician
- 18 December – (Roger) Deke Leonard, rock musician (died 2017)
- 24 December – Meirion Pennar, translator and son of Pennar Davies (died 2010)

== Deaths ==
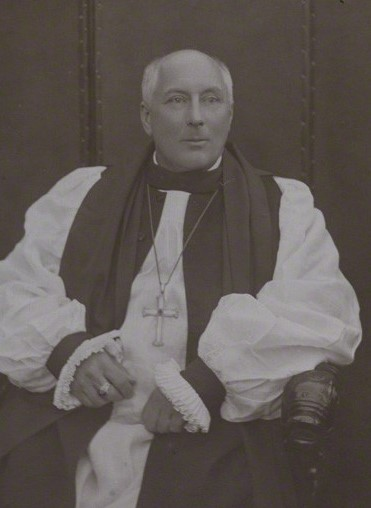
May:Charles Green

- 8 January - John Newell Evans, Welsh-born farmer and politician in Canada, 97
- 11 January - Richard Powell, Wales international rugby player, 79
- 5 March - Alun Lewis, poet, 28 (accidentally shot)
- 20 March - William Retlaw Williams, lawyer and historian, 80 or 81
- 31 March - Talfryn Evans, cricketer, 29
- 7 May - Charles Green, Bishop of Monmouth, Bishop of Bangor and Archbishop of Wales, 79
- 17 May - John Lloyd Morgan, lawyer and MP, 83
- 24 May - Sir Herbert Williams-Wynn, 7th Baronet, politician, 83
- 27 May - Griffith Hartwell Jones, academic, 85
- June - Dai Davies, footballer, 63/64
- 16 June - David Davies, 1st Baron Davies, philanthropist and MP, 64
- 25 June - James Atkin, Baron Atkin, judge, 76
- 5 August - Maurice Turnbull, cricketer, 38 (killed in action)
- 5 August - Ethel Lina White, crime novelist, 68
- 20 September - Oliver Morris, rugby player and footballer, 27 (killed in action)
- 21 September - Bob Jones, rugby union player, 69
- 25 September - David Davies, 2nd Baron Davies, 29 (killed in battle)
- 30 September- David Harris Davies, Wales international rugby union player, 66
- 5 October - Laura Evans-Williams, singer, 61
- 27 October - Clem Lewis, rugby player, 54
- 19 November - Watkin Williams, Bishop of Bangor, 99
- 8 December - Sir William Jenkins, MP for Neath, 73

== See also ==
- 1944 in Northern Ireland
