= Brynmor =

Brynmor is a given name. Notable people with the name include:

- David Brynmor Anthony (1886–1966), teacher and academic administrator
- Brynmor John (1934–1988), British Labour politician
- David Brynmor Jones (1851–1921), Welsh barrister and politician
- Keith Brynmor Jones (born 1944), Church of England priest
- Brynmor Williams (born 1951), Welsh rugby union player

== See also ==
- Brynmor Jones Library, main library at the University of Hull
- Bryn (disambiguation)
