= David James Jones =

Welsh philosopher and academic (1886–1947)

David James Jones (22 December 1886 – 23 July 1947), was a Welsh philosopher and academic.

He was born in Pontarddulais and went to school in Gowerton. He studied at Cardiff University and Emmanuel College, Cambridge. In 1915 he was ordained as a Presbyterian minister, and served as a chaplain on the Western Front in World War I.

Among his achievements was coining the word esblygiad in Welsh for evolution by natural selection.

== Works ==
- Hanes Athroniaeth: Y Cyfnod Groegaidd (1939)
