= 1941 in Wales =

- Centuries: 18th; 19th; 20th; 21st
- Decades: 1920s; 1930s; 1940s; 1950s; 1960s
- See also: List of years in Wales; Timeline of Welsh history 1941 in The United Kingdom Scotland Elsewhere

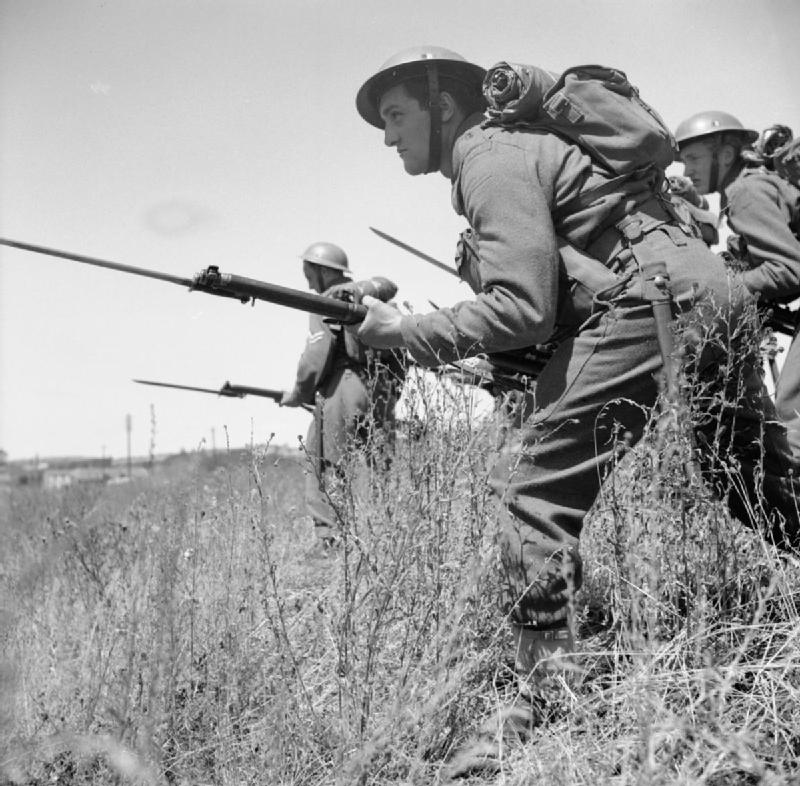
Allied Forces in Wales during WWII, dated 1941

This article is about the particular significance of the year 1941 to Wales and its people.

== Incumbents ==
- Archbishop of Wales – Charles Green, Bishop of Bangor
- Archdruid of the National Eisteddfod of Wales – Crwys

== Events ==
- January – RAF Llandwrog opens near Caernarfon as a Bomber Command training airfield.
- 2 January – Cardiff Blitz: 165 people are killed in Luftwaffe air raids on Cardiff, and Llandaff Cathedral is seriously damaged.
- 17 January – Swansea Blitz: 58 people are killed in an air raid on Swansea, the town's worst individual raid.
- 20 January – Welsh press magnate William Ewart Berry is created Viscount Camrose.
- 13 February – RAF Valley opens on Anglesey as a Fighter Command station.
- 14 February – Six people are killed in an air raid on Port Talbot.
- 17 February – Noted Baptist minister Samuel James Leeke finds his Swansea home destroyed by an air raid.
- 19-21 February – Swansea Blitz: 240 people are killed in air raids on Swansea. Much of the city centre is destroyed.
- 26 February – Four people are killed in an air raid on Cardiff. Buildings damaged include Cardiff University and a children's home.
- February – Six cattle are killed in an air raid on Cwmbran.
- 3 March – 51 people are killed in air raids at Cardiff and Penarth.
- 11 March – Three people are killed in air raids on Swansea.
- 21 March – The coaster Millisle is sunk by German planes off Caldey Island, killing ten crew.
- 27 March – The Faraday, a cable-laying ship, is sunk by German planes off St. Ann's Head in Pembrokeshire, killing 16 crew.
- 31 March – Three people are killed in air raids on Swansea.
- March – Co-developer Edward George Bowen is on board the first American experimental airborne 10 cm radar.
- 12 April – Three people are killed in air raids on Swansea.
- 15 April – 12 people are killed in an air raid on RAF Carew Cheriton.
- 29 April – 26 people are killed in air raids aimed at coal mines in the Rhondda, and a further seven in Cardiff.
- May – The Ministry of Information issues more than 14 million copies across the United Kingdom of a leaflet Beating the Invader, with a preface from Churchill, giving advice on what to do "if invasion comes"; there are also 160,400 copies of a Welsh version headed Trechu'r Goressgynnydd.
- 8 May – Three German Heinkel He 111s are shot down. Nine German crew members are killed, and the remaining three taken prisoner.
- 11 May – Three people are killed in an air raid on RAF Saint Athan.
- 12 May – 32 people are killed in an air raid on Pembroke Dock.
- 26–27 May – "Operation David": Western Command stages an exercise involving 20,000 troops simulating an invasion landing between Porthcawl and Kidwelly and a "Battle of Pontardulais".
- 30 May – Major air raid on Newport.
- 1 June – A German Junkers Ju 88 is shot down near Llandudno, killing four crew.
- 11 June – The Baron Carnegie, a cargo ship, is sunk by German planes off Strumble Head, killing 25 crew.
- 13 June – The ferry St Patrick is sunk by German planes off Strumble Head, killing thirty.
- 1 July – 37 people are killed in an air raid on Newport.
- 5 July – Alun Lewis marries Gwenno Ellis in Gloucester.
- 11 July – In a mining accident at Rhigos Colliery in Glamorgan, 16 miners are killed.
- 28 July – An RAF Wellington bomber crashes into Garn Fadryn on the Lleyn peninsula, killing six crew.
- 7 August – An RAF Wellington bomber crashes into Rhosfach in the Berwyn range, killing six crew.
- 12 August – The first evacuated paintings from the National Gallery in London are moved to underground storage at a slate quarry beneath Manod Mawr in North Wales.
- 28 August – An RAF Blackburn Botha with a crew of three crashes into the sea off Rhosneigr, Anglesey. A further eleven people die in the rescue attempt.
- September – Sir Archibald Rowlands joins the Beaverbrook and Harriman mission to Moscow.
- 10 October – Two planes collide at RAF Llandwrog, killing seventeen.
- 12 October – A German Heinkel He 111 is shot down near Holyhead, killing four crew.
- 22 October – A German Heinkel 111 is shot down near Nefyn, killing four crew.
- October – Alun Lewis receives his army commission.
- 25 November – Five miners are killed in a mining accident at Abergorki Colliery, Rhondda.
- 6 December – Ruperra Castle is seriously damaged by fire while soldiers are billeted there.
- unknown dates
  - M. S. Factory, Valley, in Flintshire becomes operational for the manufacture of chemical weapons.
  - Closure of the tinplate works at Kidwelly.
  - Sir Guildhaume Myrddin-Evans becomes Head of the Production Executive Secretariat at the War Cabinet Offices.
  - Artist Frank Brangwyn and administrator Elias Wynne Cemlyn-Jones are knighted. Brangwyn declines to travel to Buckingham Palace for the ceremony.
  - Zoo in Victoria Park, Cardiff, closes.

== Arts and literature ==
- August – Evacuated paintings from the National Gallery in London are moved to underground storage at a slate quarry beneath Manod Mawr in north Wales.
- 18 August – 19-year-old Pilot Officer John Gillespie Magee, Jr., a poet of American paternity serving in Britain with the Royal Canadian Air Force, flies a high-altitude test flight in a Spitfire V from RAF Llandow and afterwards writes the sonnet "High Flight" about the experience (completed by September 3).
- Lyn Harding makes his last stage appearance, in the West End, in Chu Chin Chow, at the age of 74.

=== Awards ===
- National Eisteddfod of Wales (held in Old Colwyn)
- National Eisteddfod of Wales: Chair – Rowland Jones, "Hydref"
- National Eisteddfod of Wales: Crown – J. M. Edwards, "Peiriannau"
- National Eisteddfod of Wales: Prose Medal – withheld

=== New books ===
==== English language ====
- Griffith Wynne Griffith – The Wonderful Life
- John Cowper Powys - Owen Glendower (first published in the USA)
- Vernon Watkins – Ballad of the Mari Lwyd

==== Welsh language ====
- Ambrose Bebb – Y Baradwys Bell
- Käte Bosse-Griffiths – Anesmwyth Hoen
- Edward Tegla Davies – Gyda'r Glannau
- Rhys Davies – Y Cristion a Rhyfel
- Ernest Llwyd Williams – Hen Ddwylo
- Nantlais Williams – Darlun a Chân
- William Williams (Crwys) – Mynd a Dod

=== Music ===
- Mansel Thomas – The White Rose
- Grace Williams – Fantasia on Welsh Nursery Tunes (first performance (broadcast) 29 October)
- David Wynne – Songs of Solitude

== Film ==
- 28 October – Release of How Green Was My Valley (book by Richard Llewellyn). Filmed in California with mainly American and Irish stars, there is only one genuinely Welsh actor, Rhys Williams, who appears in the minor role of Dai Bando. The film wins the year's Academy Award for Best Picture (awarded 26 February 1942).

== Broadcasting ==
- Stars of BBC radio's ITMA programme are moved to Bangor to record the show, because of the Blitz in London.

== Sport ==
- Football
  - 7 June – Wales lose 2–3 to England.
  - 25 October – Wales lose 1–2 to England.

== Births ==
- 1 January – Martin Evans, geneticist and academic (in Stroud, Gloucestershire)
- 5 February – Gareth Williams, Baron Williams of Mostyn, politician (d. 2003)
- 26 February – Rhys Jones, archaeologist (d. 2001)
- 27 February – Charlie Faulkner, rugby union footballer (d. 2023)
- 28 February – Tristan Garel-Jones, politician (d. 2020)
- 6 March – Marilyn Strathern, anthropologist and academic
- 31 March – David Trefgarne, 2nd Baron Trefgarne, politician
- 11 April – Arthur Davies, operatic tenor (d. 2018)
- 13 April – Margaret Price, operatic soprano (d. 2011)
- 20 April – Grace Coddington, fashion model and editor
- 16 June – Bill Morris, rugby union footballer
- 7 July
  - Alan Durban, footballer
  - Michael Howard, politician
- 11 August – Nerys Hughes, actress
- 20 August – Anne Evans, operatic soprano
- 26 September – Patrick Hannan, political journalist (d. 2009)
- 26 October – Charlie Landsborough, singer and composer
- 10 December – Jeff Jones, cricketer
- Approximate date – Ieuan Rees, calligrapher and stonecutter

== Deaths ==
- 2 January – Sir John Rowland, civil servant
- 11 January – Frederick Llewellyn-Jones, lawyer, 75
- 20 January – Margaret Lloyd George, first wife of David Lloyd George, 74
- 22 January – David Williams, Swansea politician, 75
- 3 February – Sir Clifford John Cory, 1st Baronet, coal-owner, 81
- 10 March – Sir William Henry Seager, politician, 79
- 11 March
  - Sir Henry Walford Davies, composer, 71
  - Sybil Thomas, Viscountess Rhondda, 84
- 16 March – Sir David Hughes-Morgan, solicitor and landowner, 70?
- 20 March – Jack Powell, Wales rugby union international, 58
- 17 April – Sir William Henry Hoare Vincent, civil servant, 75
- 11 July – Arthur Evans, archaeologist of Welsh descent, 90
- 13 July – Lot Jones, footballer, 59
- 15 July – Jack Elwyn Evans, rugby footballer, 43 or 44
- 23 July – Joe Jones, footballer, 54
- 27 July – Thomas Alfred Williams, Dean of Bangor, 71
- 17 August – David Edward Lewis, businessman and philanthropist, 75
- 11 September – Harry Grindell Matthews, inventor, 61
- 16 September – George Irby, 6th Baron Boston, scientist and archaeologist, 81
- 18 October – Geraint Goodwin, writer, 38
- 10 December – Admiral Tom Phillips, Welsh-descended naval officer, 53 (killed in Japanese attack on HMS Prince of Wales)
- 22 December – Richard Summers, Wales rugby union international, 81
- 31 December – George Isaac Thomas (Arfryn), composer and conductor, 46

== See also ==
- 1941 in Northern Ireland
