= Heddiw (magazine) =

Defunct Welsh literary magazine

Heddiw ("Today") was a monthly Welsh-language magazine, containing essays, short stories, book reviews, and advertisements. It was published between 1937 and 1942 by Gwasg Heddiw, a publisher based in Watford that was active in the 1940s, and was later merged with Gwasg Gee. Heddiw was edited by Aneurin ap Talfan and Dafydd Jenkins.

The magazine has been digitized by the Welsh Journals Online project at the National Library of Wales.
