= John Hughes (footballer, born 1942) =

Welsh footballer

Personal information
- Full name: John Gareth Hughes
- Date of birth: 18 February 1942 (age 84)
- Place of birth: Prestatyn, Wales
- Position: Centre forward

Senior career*
Years	Team	Apps	(Gls)
?–1962	Rhyl		
1962	Chester	2	(0)
- * Club domestic league appearances and goals

John Hughes (born 18 February 1942) is a Welsh former footballer who played for Chester in The Football League.

Hughes was born in Prestatyn. He joined Chester from Rhyl in the summer of 1962 and was one of nine new signings in the side for Chester's opening game of 1962–63 at Gillingham. He again wore the number nine shirt in their second game of the season at Darlington, but did not play for the club again.

== Bibliography ==
- Sumner, Chas (1997). On the Borderline: The Official History of Chester City F.C. 1885-1997. Yore Publications. ISBN 978-1-874427-52-0.
