= Tenovus Cancer Care =

Welsh charitable organization

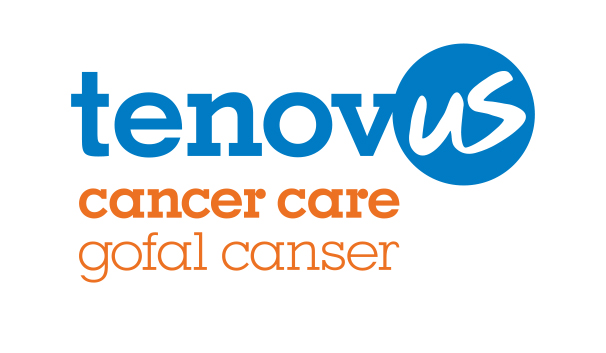
- Tenovus Cancer Care logo
- Founded: January 1, 1943
- Founder: D.R. Edwards, C. Harris, G. Brinn, C.E. Rolfe, D. Curitz, G.T. Addis, T.J.E. Price, H. Thomas, H.E. Gosling and T. Curitz
- Type: Charity
- Registration no.: Charity number: 1054015
- Location: Cardiff
- Coordinates: 51.480°N 3.181°W
- Region served: Wales and England
- Patron: The Princess Royal
- Key people: Tracey Mary Burke
- Revenue: £8,616,432 (2023)
- Employees: 214
- Volunteers: 1185
- Website: www.tenovuscancercare.org.uk
- Formerly called: Tenovus

Tenovus Cancer Care is a Welsh cancer charity that provides information, advice and specialist support to people affected by cancer and their families, including a nurse-led support line, counselling, benefits and financial advice.

== History ==
Tenovus Cancer Care was established in 1943 by ten businessmen (hence the 'ten of us'). Those men were D.R. Edwards, C. Harris, G. Brinn, C.E. Rolfe, D. Curitz, G.T. Addis, T.J.E. Price, H. Thomas, H.E. Gosling and T. Curitz.

Initially, the charity funded a range of local projects in health and social field. In 1964, Tenovus Cancer Care embarked on a project that was to influence their work over the next 40 years. D.R. Edwards, the founder Chairman of the group of ten, cut the first sod on the site of the Tenovus Institute for Cancer Research in Cardiff. Since then, Tenovus Cancer Care has concentrated its efforts on cancer, and Tenovus Cancer Care scientists have been recognised for their pioneering work.

Tenovus Cancer Care remains the biggest Wales-based funder of cancer research and has developed a range of services to support cancer patients directly, including a free Support Line, benefits advice, two Mobile Cancer Support Units and 'Sing with Us' choirs across the country. In 2018, the charity celebrated its 75th anniversary.

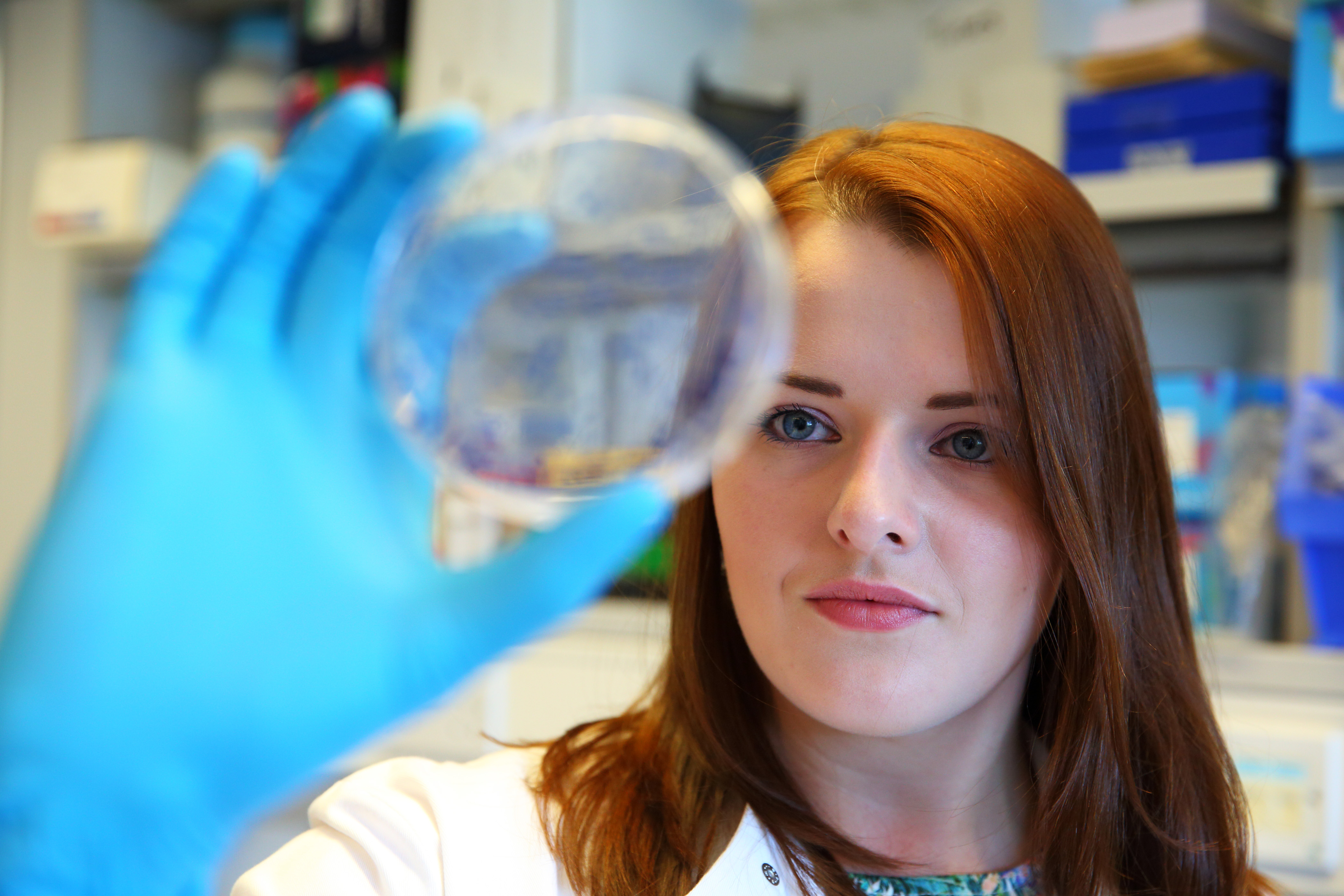
Tenovus Cancer Care funded PhD Researcher Ellyn Hughes.

== Research ==
The charity previously supported scientists whose research led to significant discoveries benefiting cancer patients globally. For example, in 1975, researchers demonstrated that a contraceptive pill could inhibit the growth of breast cancers, ultimately contributing to the development of Tamoxifen, a medication widely used by millions of women worldwide.[1][2]

Tenovus Cancer Care previously allocated approximately £1M annually to fund research endeavors, including both laboratory research aimed at advancing cancer treatments, and community-based research initiatives to support local individuals and their families.[3] The charity formerly funded PhD studentships at Cardiff,[4] Swansea[5] and Bangor[4] universities, but no longer funds or conducts research.

== Cancer Support ==
Tenovus Cancer Care's first Mobile Support Unit was launched in February 2009. Since its launch, the unit has expanded its services to more than 50 locations, providing support to numerous patients and visitors. Working with Velindre NHS Trust, Tenovus Cancer Care has been delivering chemotherapy and other cancer treatments in Cwmbran and Nantgarw. During this period, the Mobile Support Unit has provided over 10,000 treatments.

In October 2013, a second Mobile Support Unit was launched to deliver support for people with lymphoedema, an incurable condition that can be a side-effect of cancer treatment. In October 2018, the new £1 million Mobile Support Unit was unveiled by the Princess Royal. It is notably sized, with seven chemotherapy chairs, capable of accommodating 30 patients daily and delivering over 8,500 treatments annually. Calculations suggest that the collective impact of the existing Mobile Support Units saves the NHS in Wales more than £1 million annually, and the new Mobile Support Unit could deliver more than 125,000 treatments over its operational lifespan.

In 2014, Tenovus Cancer Care collaborated with Movember and Prostate Cancer UK to launch the UK's first ManVan, a 38-foot American Motorhome that offers men a safe, relaxing space in which to discuss issues around male cancers such as prostate and testicular cancer. During the three-year project, the ManVan had more than 6,200 visitors, helped over 600 men who had a cancer diagnosis and offered around 4,000 appointments. It visited almost 100 locations across the country and travelled over 42,326 miles.

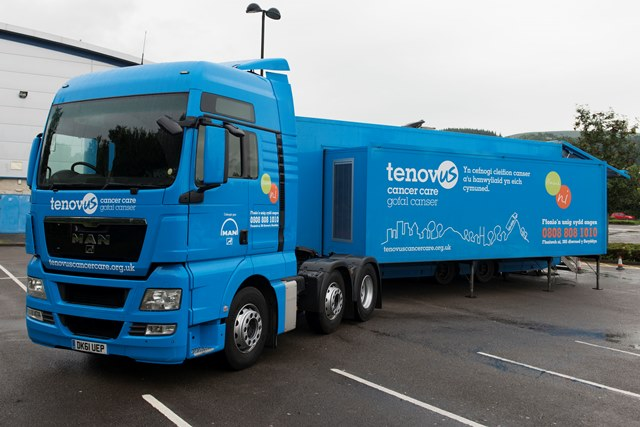
The Tenovus Cancer Care Mobile Support Unit

Tenovus Cancer Care also has a 14-strong team of Cancer Support Advisors, offering help, guidance and support through its multi-disciplinary service, allowing patients and their families to access a number of services directly through the charity. The team provides advice about welfare benefits for cancer patients and helps people apply for grants, blue badges and other essential support.

Tenovus Cancer Care has a national free Support Line (0808 808 1010), which is open 8am-8pm, 365 days a year. They more recently launched a proactive telephone chemotherapy callback service (Tenovus Cancer Care Callback) where a Tenovus Cancer Care Nurse Specialist contacts cancer patients throughout their treatment to provide advice and support.

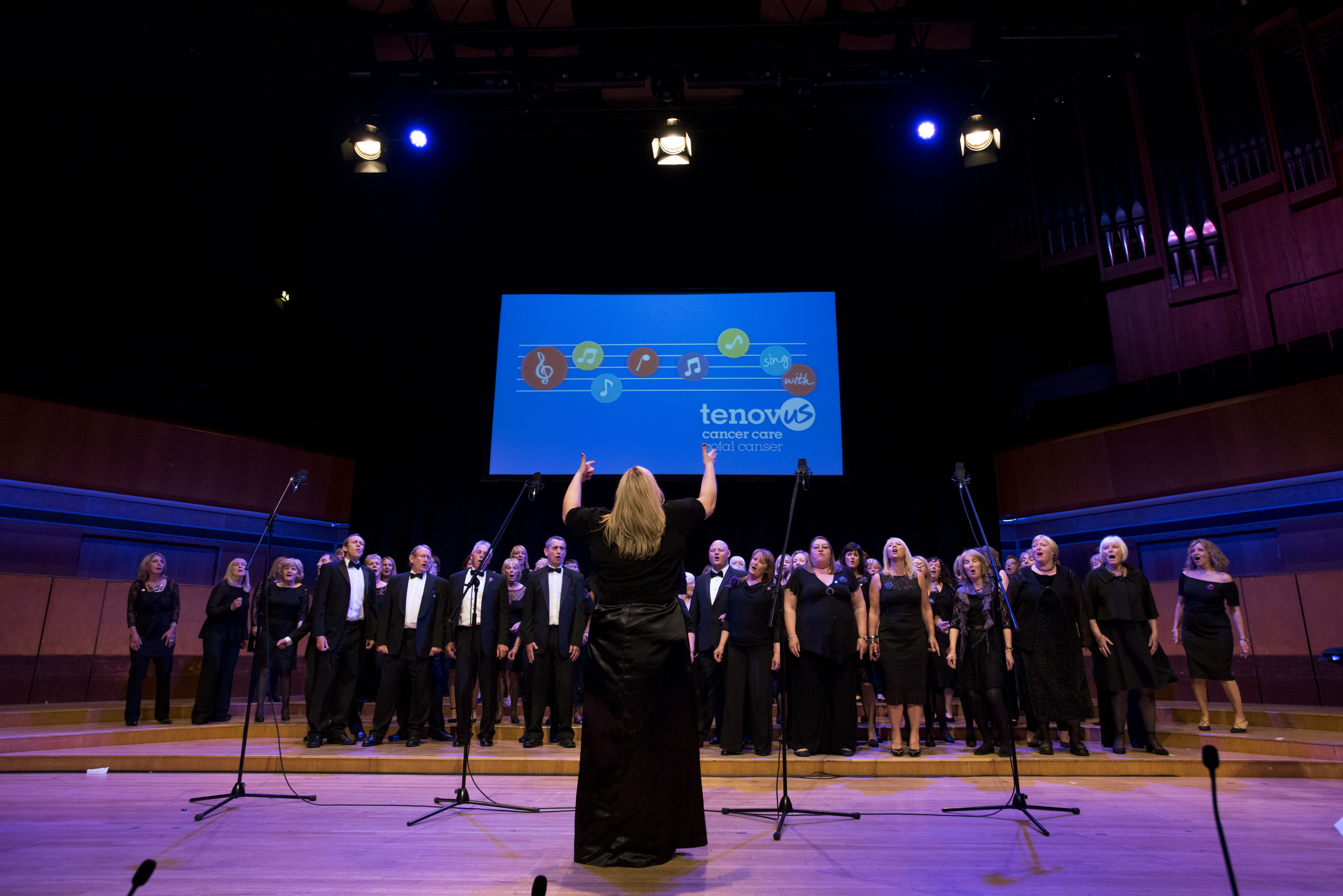
Cardiff Sing with Us choir.

== Sing with Us choirs ==
In 2012, Tenovus Cancer Care launched the 'Sing with Us' project, funded by the Big Lottery, to run 15 choirs across Wales for cancer patients, survivors, their families and people bereaved through cancer. Initial research conducted by Cardiff University and Tenovus Cancer Care has proved that singing in the choirs reduces anxiety and pain, as well as helping to improve physical function. Tenovus Cancer Care's work in this area also featured in the October 2012 Channel 4 documentary 'Sing For Your Life', where the charity set up a choir of cancer patients that performed at the Royal Albert Hall.

In late 2014, Tenovus Cancer Care set up their first Sing with Us choir outside Wales, in Guildford, Surrey. In 2015, Tenovus Cancer Care conducted research with the Royal College of Music in London into the benefits of singing. By taking saliva samples from around 200 choir members before, and after rehearsal, they showed singing in one of their choirs was effective at reducing peoples' anxiety and depression, and had a positive impact on biological markers related to stress, immune function and inflammatory response. This research is now being expanded on with a two-year study with the Royal College of Music and the Royal Marsden Hospital.

== See also ==
- Cancer in the United Kingdom
