= 1945 in England =

- Centuries: 18th; 19th; 20th; 21st
- Decades: 1920s; 1930s; 1940s; 1950s; 1960s
- See also: 1944–45 in English football 1945–46 in English football 1945 in the United Kingdom; Other events of 1945

Events from 1945 in England

== Incumbent ==
- Monarch - George VI
- Prime Minister - Winston Churchill (until 26 July), Clement Attlee (from 26 July)

== Events ==
=== May ===
- May 8 – Victory in Europe Day is celebrated throughout the UK. Prime Minister Winston Churchill makes a victory speech and appears on the balcony of Buckingham Palace with George VI, Queen Elizabeth and Princesses Elizabeth and Margaret. Street parties take place throughout the country.

== Births ==
- January 21 – Martin Shaw, actor
- February 4 – Tony Haygarth, actor (died 2017)
- February 13 – Simon Schama, historian
- February 16 – Jeremy Bulloch, actor (died 2020)
- April 10 – James Bate, actor (died 1992)
- April 21 – Diana Darvey, actress, singer and dancer (died 2000)
- May 14 – Francesca Annis, actress
- July 10 – John Motson, football commentator (died 2023)
- July 26 – Helen Mirren, actress.
- August 1 – Laila Morse, actress
- August 5 – Martin Lambie-Nairn, designer (died 2020)
- August 6 – Ron Jones, director (died 1995)
- September 14 – Martin Tyler, football commentator
- October 14 – Lesley Joseph, actress
- October 18 – Juliette Slaughter, racing driver.
- November 30 – Hilary Armstrong, politician.
- December 17 – Jacqueline Wilson, children's novelist.
- December 30 – Davy Jones, singer (died 2012)
- Tom O'Carroll, paedophilia advocate

== Deaths ==
- 26 March – David Lloyd George, politician (Prime Minister of the United Kingdom (1916-1921)) (born 1863)
- 5 December – Cosmo Gordon Lang, Archbishop of Canterbury (born 1864)

== See also ==
- 1945 in Northern Ireland
- 1945 in Scotland
- 1945 in Wales
