= Talfryn Evans =

Welsh cricketer

Personal information
- Full name: Talfryn Evans
- Born: 10 June 1914; Llanelli, Carmarthenshire, Wales
- Died: 31 March 1944 (aged 29); Llanelli, Carmarthenshire, Wales
- Batting: Left-handed
- Bowling: Slow left-arm orthodox

Domestic team information
- Years: Team
- 1934: Glamorgan

Career statistics
Competition	First-class
Matches	1
Runs scored	0
Batting average	0.00
100s/50s	–/–
Top score	0*
Balls bowled	32
Wickets	–
Bowling average	–
5 wickets in innings	–
10 wickets in match	–
Best bowling	–
Catches/stumpings	–/–
- Source: Cricinfo, 6 August 2012

Talfryn Evans (10 June 1914 – 31 March 1944) was a Welsh cricketer. He was a left-handed batsman and left-arm slow bowler who played for Glamorgan. He was born and died at Llanelli, Carmarthenshire.

Evans, a left-arm spin bowler who, due to a bout of rheumatic fever he suffered as a child, was unable to fully use his right arm, and thus worked on left-arm spin bowling. Having played club cricket for Llanelli, he made just a single first-class appearance, during the 1934 season, against Kent, though he appeared regularly for the Second XI.

Evans died at the age of just 29 years old.
