= Robert Griffith Berry =

Welsh Independent minister, author and playwright

Robert Griffith Berry, also known as R. G. Berry, (20 May 1869 – 16 January 1945) was a Welsh Congregationalist minister and writer of short stories and plays.

== Early life and education ==
His parents were Margaret (née Williams) and John Berry, who lived in the Llanrwst, Conwy County Borough area. On completing his grammar school education in Llanrwst, he attended Bangor University College and later Bala-Bangor Theological Seminary. He was awarded an honorary M.A. degree in 1925 by the University of Wales.

== Career ==
He was inducted pastor at Bethlehem, Gwaelod-y-Garth in 1896. In 1943, he was chairman of the Glamorgan Congregational Union.

Berry wrote plays about social issues in the Welsh language. A drama movement began about 1890 in Welsh communities, often with productions organised by Nonconformist churches. To promote literary works in dramatic form, Thomas Scott-Ellis, Lord Howard de Walden established an annual £100 (equivalent to $10,184 in 2025) prize in 1911. Berry shared the prize in 1913 for his play Ar y Groesffordd. His other writings include a number of plays, such as Asgre lân, Y Ddraenen Wen, Owen Gwynedd, Cadw Noswyl, and Yr Hen Anian, and short stories such as those published in Llawr Dyrnu.

He died in January 1945 and was buried at Pen-tyrch cemetery.
