= Ysgol Gymraeg Dewi Sant, Llanelli =

Welsh-medium school in Llanelli, Wales

- English: St David's Primary School

Information
- Established: 1947
- Language: Welsh
- Website: https://www.ysgolgymraegdewisant.cymru/

Ysgol Gymraeg Dewi Sant, (St David's Primary School) Llanelli, Wales, was the first Welsh medium school to be run by a local authority. It was opened by Miss Olwen Williams on Saint David's Day (1 March) 1947. The school was run in the Zion chapel school room.

In 2017 a plaque was put up marking the school's 70th anniversary.
