= Thomas Rhondda Williams =

Thomas Rhondda Williams (1860 – 21 November 1945) was a Welsh Congregational minister.

Born at Cowbridge in Glamorgan, Williams' father was a Methodist minister. Williams was one of eighteen children, and was sent out to work at the Penygraig Colliery when he was nine years old. He found religion to be a welcome relief from long working days, and began preaching when he was thirteen years old.

In 1877, Williams won a Dr Williams Scholarship to study at Carmarthen College, and he was ordained three years later. From 1884, he was a minister at Neath, then in 1888 he transferred to Bradford, where he became interested in socialism. The Manchester Guardian described him as "holding advanced views on religion, which he expressed vigorously... regarded by older people as almost too heretical for the Congregational ministry". However, he became known as a powerful and persuasive preacher, and won a considerable following.

Williams was a founding vice-president of the League of Progressive Thought in 1908, working closely with the Reverend R. J. Campbell. He transferred to Brighton in 1909, taking over Campbell's congregation, and remained there for the rest of his career.

At the 1918 United Kingdom general election, Williams stood for the Labour Party in Cambridge, taking 24.7% of the vote.

Williams served as chair of the Congregational Church of England and Wales in 1929/30. He wrote many religious tracts, and after his retirement in 1931, he wrote two autobiographical works: Faith Without Fear and How I found my Faith: a Religious Pilgrimage.
