= Glyn Berry =

Canadian diplomat (1946–2006)

- Born: Glyn Raymond Berry; June 14, 1946; Barry, Vale of Glamorgan, Wales
- Died: January 15, 2006 (aged 59); Kandahar, Afghanistan
- Education: Dalhousie University
- Occupation: Diplomat
- Spouse: Valerie Berry

Glyn Raymond Berry (June 14, 1946 – January 15, 2006) was a Canadian diplomat killed by a suicide car bombing attack in Afghanistan. He was the first Canadian diplomat to be killed while on duty in Afghanistan. Two other civilians were killed in the incident and ten people were wounded, including three Canadian soldiers, Master Corporal Paul Franklin, Private William Edward Salikin and Corporal Jeffrey Bailey.

== Early life and education ==
Born in Wales, Berry graduated from the University of Wales, Swansea with a BA in political science. He then graduated from McMaster University with a Masters in Political Science, and continued his studies at Dalhousie University, where he graduated with a PhD in political science in 1981.

== Career ==
He joined Canada's Foreign Affairs Department in 1977 and had served in Oslo, Washington, Havana, London, Islamabad and at the United Nations in New York City. He was sent to Rwanda as part of an inquiry on Canada's role in the country and filed a report in 2004.

He had volunteered for duty in Afghanistan and was appointed as Political Director for the Department of Foreign Affairs to the Provincial Reconstruction Team.

Berry's body was flown by a Canadian Forces C-130 Hercules transport and was buried in his birthplace of Wales.

Dalhousie University set up the Glyn R. Berry Memorial Scholarship. It is awarded annually, starting in 2008, to a PhD student in political science who "will specialize in an aspect of Canadian foreign policy, defence and security policy, development assistance policy or another area of study addressing Canada's role in international affairs" .
