= Thomas Griffiths (general) =

Australian general

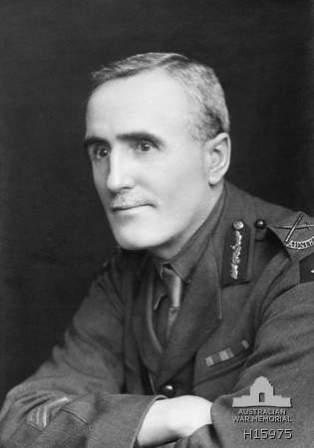
- Brigadier General Thomas Griffiths c. 1918–19
- Born: 29 September 1865; Presteigne, Wales
- Died: 16 November 1947 (aged 82); Toorak, Victoria, Australia
- Burial place: Melbourne General Cemetery
- Military career
- Allegiance: Australia
- Branch: Australian Army
- Service years: 1886–1927
- Rank: Brigadier General
- Commands: AIF Headquarters London (1917–19)
- Conflicts: First World War
- Awards: Companion of the Order of St Michael and St George; Commander of the Order of the British Empire; Distinguished Service Order; Mentioned in Despatches (2)

Brigadier General Thomas Griffiths, CMG, CBE, DSO (29 September 1865 – 16 November 1947) was a Welsh-born officer in the Australian Army who served in mainly administrative positions during the First World War. He later served as Administrator of Nauru and of Papua New Guinea.

== Early life ==
Thomas Griffiths was born on 29 September 1865 in the town of Presteigne, Radnor, Wales, the son of a builder. He was educated at the Old Vicarage, Wrexham, Denbighshire. After completing his schooling, he emigrated to Australia.

== Military career ==
In 1886, Griffiths joined the Victorian Permanent Artillery as a gunner. Four years later, he became a military staff clerk at headquarters in Melbourne. He was promoted to regimental quartermaster sergeant in 1894 and the following year received a further promotion to warrant officer and became chief clerk of the Victorian Military Forces. After the Federation of Australia, he became a clerk in the Australian Military Forces, serving at the Adjutant General's office at Army Headquarters in Melbourne. In September 1908 he was appointed secretary to the Military Board with the honorary rank of lieutenant in the Administrative and Instructional Staff. He became an honorary captain on 30 August 1909.

== First World War ==
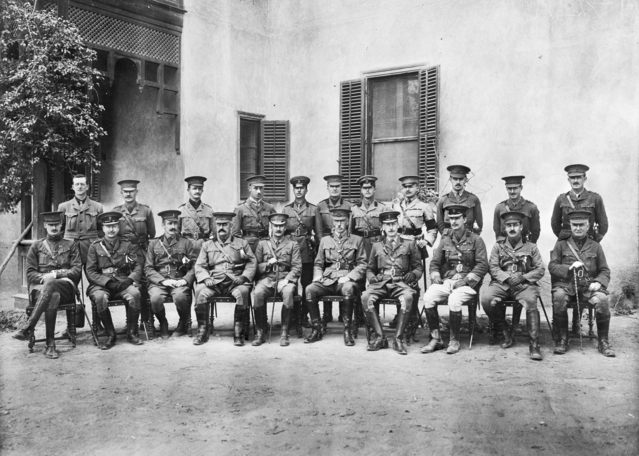
Group portrait of 1st Division staff officers at Mena Camp, December 1914. Griffiths, then a captain, is stood in the back row, sixth from the right.

At the time of the outbreak of the First World War, Griffiths held the rank of honorary major. He volunteered for the Australian Imperial Force (AIF) on 15 August 1914, and was appointed as a captain on the 1st Division staff. In January 1915, Major General William Bridges appointed Griffiths as his military secretary. On 28 March 1915 he became Deputy Assistant Adjutant General (DAAG) of the 1st Division. Griffith landed at ANZAC Cove with the 1st Division Headquarters at around 7:30 am on 25 April 1915. He would serve throughout the Gallipoli campaign. As DAAG, he was responsible for personnel and on most nights could be found on the beach, checking and sorting reinforcements, often under fire. On 12 May 1915, Griffiths became acting Deputy Assistant Adjutant and Quartermaster General (DAA & QMG). As such he was deputy to Lieutenant Colonel Cecil Foott, who was responsible for all administration and logistics in the 1st Division area at Anzac Cove. In June, Griffiths was promoted to major.

In October 1915, Griffiths was transferred to the staff of the Australian and New Zealand Army Corps, then under the command of Lieutenant General Sir William Birdwood. He acted as Birdwood's military secretary, and given responsibility for all matters concerning promotion. In effect, Griffiths became adjutant general of the AIF, and it would be through him that Birdwood administered the AIF. For his work at Gallipoli and in the subsequent reorganisation of the AIF in Egypt, Griffiths was mentioned in despatches and awarded the Distinguished Service Order (DSO). In May 1916, with Birdwood now commanding I Anzac Corps which was intended for service on the Western Front, Griffiths was promoted to lieutenant colonel and formally became Assistant Adjutant General of the AIF.

On 8 April 1917, and against his wishes, Griffiths became acting commandant of the AIF Headquarters in London. He was promoted to full colonel and confirmed in the post on 12 May 1917. As such he was responsible for the entire administration of the AIF, the handling of pay and promotions, the recording of deaths and casualties, the postal services and record keeping. Griffiths was also the representative of the Department of the Defence in dealings with the British War Office. On 1 January 1918, he became a temporary brigadier general.

The war ended with Griffiths in Australia, having travelled there to work out medical policy with the Department of Defence. The armistice rendered his task moot, and he returned to London in December and resumed duty at AIF Headquarters for several months. He was discharged from the AIF on his return to Melbourne in September 1919. He was highly thought of by his superior, Brigadier General Brudenell White and Charles Bean wrote that he "was one of the great figures of the Australian Army." For his work, Griffiths was appointed Companion of the Order of St Michael and St George (CMG) in January 1917 and Commander of the Order of the British Empire (CBE) in January 1919.

== Post war ==
In March 1920, Griffiths became Inspector General of Administration at the Department of Defence but this was only for a short period before he took up an appointment as Administrator of New Guinea the following month. He served in this role for nearly a year. In 1921, he became Administrator of Nauru, a post he held until 1927, when he retired. His retirement was short lived; in 1929 he became head of the Commonwealth War Pensions Entitlement Appeal Tribunal. He returned to New Guinea as Administrator from 1932 to 1934, after which he retired. He attempted to come out of retirement again in 1938, when he unsuccessfully applied for the administrator position in Nauru. During the Second World War he served for a time in the Department of Defence Co-ordination.

Griffiths died on 16 November 1947 and was buried with military honours in Melbourne General Cemetery. His wife, who he had married in 1891, predeceased him. The couple had two daughters.
