= 1944 in England =

- Centuries: 18th; 19th; 20th; 21st
- Decades: 1920s; 1930s; 1940s; 1950s; 1960s
- See also: 1943–44 in English football 1944–45 in English football 1944 in the United Kingdom; Other events of 1944

Events from 1944 in England

== Incumbent ==
- Monarch - George VI
- Prime Minister - Winston Churchill

== Events ==
=== March ===
- 22 March – World War II: a Royal Air Force Halifax Bomber crashed soon after take-off from Hurn Airport.

=== June ===
- 13 June – World War II: the first V-1 flying bomb attack on London takes place. Eight civilians are killed in the blast. The bomb earns the nickname "doodlebug".

=== November ===
22nd Laurence Olivier's film of Shakespeare's Henry V is released.

== Births ==
- 14 December – Denis Thwaites, English professional footballer murdered in the 2015 Sousse attacks (died 2015 in Tunisia)

== See also ==
- 1944 in Northern Ireland
- 1944 in Scotland
- 1944 in Wales
