= Trawsnant =

Village in Ceredigion, Wales

Coordinates: 52.278595°N 4.100209°W

- Location within Ceredigion
- OS grid reference: SN 5682 6657
  - Cardiff: 67.8 mi (109.1 km)
  - London: 177.5 mi (285.7 km)
- Community: Llanrhystud
- Principal area: Ceredigion
- Country: Wales
- Sovereign state: United Kingdom
- Post town: Aberystwyth
- Postcode district: SY23
- Police: Dyfed-Powys
- Fire: Mid and West Wales
- Ambulance: Welsh
- UK Parliament: Ceredigion Preseli
- Senedd Cymru – Welsh Parliament: Ceredigion

Trawsnant is a hamlet in the community of Llanrhystud, Ceredigion, Wales, which is 67.8 miles (109.1 km) from Cardiff and 177.5 miles (285.7 km) from London. Trawsnant is represented in the Senedd by Elin Jones (Plaid Cymru) and is part of the Ceredigion Preseli constituency in the House of Commons.

== See also ==
- List of localities in Wales by population
