= Caniadaeth y Cysegr =

Welsh-language Christian religious radio programme

- Other names: transl. Sacred Song
- Genre: Congregational hymn singing
- Running time: 30 minutes
- Country of origin: Wales
- Language: Welsh
- Home station: BBC Home Service (Wales) (1942–1967); BBC Radio 4 (Wales) (1967–1977); BBC Radio Cymru (1977–present)
- Hosted by: R. Alun Evans
- Original release: 15 February 1942 – present
- Audio format: Stereo
- Website: www.bbc.co.uk/programmes/b007rkpc

Caniadaeth y Cysegr (Welsh pronunciation: [ˈkaːnɪaːdaːeːθ ˈə ˈkəseːgr]; transl. Sacred Song) is a Christian religious radio programme of congregational hymn-singing, produced in the Welsh language by BBC Radio Cymru. Traditionally broadcast on a Sunday afternoon with R. Alun Evans presenting the hymns, it comprises recorded excerpts from Cymanfaoedd Canu (plural of Cymanfa Ganu, transl. Singing Festival) from across Wales. Largely amateur singers sing in four-voice harmony on this programme.

The programme was first broadcast on the BBC Home Service on 15 February 1942, it is the longest running Welsh-language broadcast.

In its archive it has a recording of every hymn in the Welsh hymn book Caneuon Ffydd.
