= David Hughes (footballer, born 1943) =

Welsh footballer

Personal information
- Full name: David James Hughes
- Date of birth: 27 April 1943 (age 83)
- Place of birth: Connah's Quay, Wales
- Position: Winger

Senior career*
| Years | Team | Apps | (Gls) |
| 1962–1963 | Tranmere Rovers | 2 | (0) |
- * Club domestic league appearances and goals

David James Hughes (born 27 April 1943) is a Welsh footballer, who played as a winger in the Football League for Tranmere Rovers.
