= 1946 in England =

- Centuries: 18th; 19th; 20th; 21st
- Decades: 1920s; 1930s; 1940s; 1950s; 1960s
- See also: 1945–46 in English football 1946–47 in English football 1946 in the United Kingdom; Other events of 1946

Events from 1946 in England

== Incumbent ==
Monarch - George VI

Prime Minister - Clement Attlee

== Events ==
=== June ===
- 8 June – a victory parade is held in London to celebrate the end of World War II.

== Births ==
- 21 February – Alan Rickman, actor and director (died 2016)
- 25 September – Felicity Kendal, actress
- 12 September – Neil Lyndon, journalist and writer
- 10 October – Charles Dance, actor

== Deaths ==
- 11 July – Paul Nash, artist (born 1889)

== See also ==
- 1946 in Northern Ireland
- 1946 in Scotland
- 1946 in Wales
