= Ceinwen Rowlands =

Welsh soprano

Ceinwen Rowlands (15 January 1905 – 12 June 1983) was a Welsh concert soprano and recording artist.

Rowlands was born in Holyhead, Anglesey, the daughter of William and Kate Rowlands; William was the proprietor of the "Anglesey Emporium", a men's outfitters. Kate Rowlands (née Jones) was a singer, originally from Cerrigydrudion, Denbighshire. Ceinwen Rowlands took lessons from Wilfrid Jones, a Wrexham-based singing teacher. Her reputation as a singer was made when she won first prize in two successive North Wales national eisteddfods, at Mold, Flintshire, in 1923 and Pwllheli in 1925; she was received into the Gorsedd in 1927.

Rowlands continued to appear in eisteddfods throughout her career, even after re-locating to London, giving the premiere of a Welsh translation of Felix Mendelssohn’s Lobgesang in 1943 at Bangor. She provided one of the off-stage voices for Ninette de Valois's ballet based on Orpheus and Eurydice in 1941. and was a soloist in The Messiah at Cradley Heath in 1945. In 1946 she married Arthur Aaron Walter (died 1967), who held the position of Official Receiver at the London Bankruptcy Court.

Rowlands appeared in concert alongside Kathleen Ferrier, among others. Her many recordings included Welsh songs and works by Welsh composers such as Morfydd Llwyn Owen.

Rowlands' career ended in 1961, and she retired to Rhyl after her husband's death. She died in Clatterbridge Hospital, Cheshire, aged 78.

== Notable recordings ==
- Decca 2; AM 626; DR 12795-1: Welsh Music (Boyd Neel Orchestra with Mansel Thomas; date unknown)
- Decca 2; AM 627; DR 12793-1: Welsh Music (Boyd Neel Orchestra with Mansel Thomas; date unknown)
- Decca 2; AM 627; DR 12794-1: Welsh Music (Boyd Neel Orchestra with Mansel Thomas; date unknown)
