= Phil Carradice =

Phil Carradice (born 1947), is a Welsh writer and broadcaster.

Carradice was born in Pembroke Dock. He was educated at Cardiff College of Education and Cardiff University, and became a teacher and social worker. After several years as head of Headlands Special School in Penarth, near Cardiff, he retired from the teaching profession to become a full-time writer. He hosts a history series on BBC Radio Wales entitled The Past Master.

Carradice is a prolific public speaker and travels extensively in the course of his work.

== Works ==
=== Fiction ===
- Hour of the Wolf (1985)

=== Children's ===
- The Bosun's Secret (2000)
- The Pirates of Thorn Island (2001)
- Hannah Goes to War (2005)
- Black Bart's Treasure (2007)
- The Wild West Story (2013)

=== Non-fiction ===
- Failures of System (1976)
- The Last Invasion (1992)
- The Write Way (1996)
- Welsh Islands (1997)
- Shooting the Sacred Cows (1998)
- Exploring the Pembrokeshire Coast (2002)
- Wales at War (2005)
- Coming Home: Wales After the War (2005)
- A Town Built to Build Ships - A History of Pembroke Dock (2006)
- Life Choices (2006)
- People’s Poetry of the Great War (Cecil Woolf, 2007)
- The Black Chair (2008)
- People’s Poetry of World War Two (Cecil Woolf, 2009)
- The First World War in the Air (Amberley, 2012)
- 1914:the First World War at Sea in Photographs (Amberley, 2014)
- The Battles of Coronel and the Falklands: British Naval Campaigns in the Southern Hemisphere 1914-19 (Fonthill, 2014)
- The Cuban Missile Crisis: 13 Days on an Atomic Knife Edge, October 1962 (Pen & Sword Books, 2018)

=== Poetry ===
- Cautionary Tale (1998)
- Ghostly Riders (2002)

== Sources ==
- Brief biography
