= Dafydd Jenkins (legal scholar) =

Welsh legal scholar (1911–2012)

Dafydd Arwyn Jenkins (christened David; 1 March 1911 – 5 May 2012) was a Welsh barrister, activist, and legal scholar and historian. He was Professor of Legal History and Welsh Law at the University College of Wales, Aberystwyth (later Aberystwyth University), from 1975 to 1978.

== Life and work ==
Born in London to Welsh parents, William and Elizabeth Jenkins, he was educated at Sidney Sussex College, Cambridge, and called to the bar at Gray's Inn in 1934. A "socialist Anglican, a man of letters, a Welsh-language publisher ... and a nationalist", Jenkins practised as a barrister on the South Wales circuit. In the late 1930s, he campaigned for Welsh to be recognised in courts (as secretary to the National Language Petition); he wrote for the left-wing, Welsh nationalist publication Heddiw from 1936 to 1942, and produced an account of the Tan yn Llyn incident in 1937. He ceased practising as barrister in 1938. A conscientious objector during the Second World War, he farmed in Trawsnant, Ceredigion, and helped to establish farming cooperatives in Wales. He also began teaching about agriculture with the Extra-Mural Department of the University College of Wales, Aberystwyth, where he was appointed to a lectureship in the Law Department in 1965. Ten years later, he was appointed to the chair in legal history and Welsh law, serving until his retirement in 1978 after which he was an emeritus professor.

Described by The Independent as "the major authority on the laws of the 10th century Hywel ap Cadell, or Hywel Dda", Jenkins produced a composite of his laws from surviving, later manuscripts. He translated and commented widely upon medieval Welsh legal texts and Welsh-language law books. His entry in the Dictionary of Welsh Biography concludes that Jenkins "remains a significant figure in modern Welsh history, not least because he revealed so much about that history itself".

Jenkins had married Gwyneth Owen in 1942; she died ten years later. Their son, Rhys, is an academic. Jenkins continued to write into his retirement. He died on 5 May 2012 at Blaenpennal and was buried at Joppa.

== Honours and awards ==
In 1946, Jenkins won the Prose Medal of the National Eisteddfod for his history of the Hanes y Nofel Gymraeg. In 1986, he was presented with a festschrift, Lawyers and Laymen: Studies in the History of Law. In 2009, the British Academy awarded Jenkins the Derek Allen Prize for Celtic Studies. He also received a doctor of letters degree (DLitt) from the University of Cambridge, and an honorary doctorate from the University of Würzburg.
