= John Henry Evans =

American Mormon educator and writer

- Born: 8 April 1872; Wales
- Died: 24 March 1947 (aged 74); Salt Lake City
- Resting place: Salt Lake City Cemetery
- Occupations: Mormon educator and writer
- Known for: 1933 biography Joseph Smith, An American Prophet
- Spouse: Amy Jane Whipple
- Children: four
- Parent(s): John David Evans and Margaret Thomas Evans

John Henry Evans (April 8, 1872 – March 24, 1947) was an early-20th century Mormon educator and writer, most known for his 1933 biography Joseph Smith, An American Prophet, published by Macmillan.

== Biography ==
Evans was born in Wales to John David Evans and Margaret Thomas Evans. When he was four years old, they emigrated to the United States.

In 1900 Evans married Amy Jane Whipple, who served on the Relief Society general board starting in 1921. They had four children.

Evans served from 1906 to 1920 as a member of the General Board of the Religion Classes of the Church of Jesus Christ of Latter-day Saints (LDS Church). He also taught at Latter-day Saints University, the predecessor of LDS Business College.

Evans lived in Salt Lake City, Utah for over 50 years, where he also died and was buried, in the Salt Lake City Cemetery.

== Publications ==
In 1912 Evans published with B. H. Roberts a work on the Spaulding theory of the origins of the Book of Mormon. Evans also wrote some of the entries included in Andrew Jenson's Latter-day Saint Biographical Encyclopedia.

Evans authored Joseph Smith, An American Prophet as well as Messages and Characters of the Book of Mormon (with his son John Henry Evans, Jr.), The Story of Utah (1933), One Hundred Years of Mormonism and biographies of Ezra T. Benson and Charles C. Rich. He also compiled material to write a biography of James Moyle but became terminally ill before the book reached beyond the initial manuscript stage and the book was completed after his death by Gordon B. Hinckley.

== Sources ==
- Dew, Sheri L., Go Forward With Faith: The Biography of Gordon B. Hinckley. (Salt Lake City: Deseret Book, 1996) p. 138.
- Listing of 50 important Mormon books, including one by Evans
- A historiographical article on Utah
