= Matthew W. Davies =

Welsh organist, choirmaster and composer of hymn-tunes

Matthew William Davies (August 1882 – 23 November 1947) was a Welsh musician. His parents were Richard and Catherine Davies of Neath, Glamorganshire. When he was 20 he won a scholarship of £40 a year (for three years) to study at University College, Cardiff. He graduated in 1905 with a Mus. Bac., and a B.A. in 1906. He then studied for a further year, in London, before settling back in the Neath area, where he earned his living as a music teacher and was appointed organist and choirmaster of Bethlehem Green Calvinistic Methodist Church. He was also in demand as a conductor, and adjudicator at singing festivals.

His compositions include many anthems, part-songs, and hymn-tunes for children and congregational singing, such as the hymn-tune ‘Bethlehem Green’ (written for Y Caniedydd Cynulleidfaol Newydd, 1921).

He died in November 1947 and was buried in Llantwit-juxta-Neath cemetery.
