= SS Gripfast =

Ship built in 1941

History
- Name: Empire Brook (1941-46); Stancliffe (1946-48); Gripfast (1948-60); Capetan Costas P (1960-66); Karine M (1966); Pitsa (1966-67)
- Owner: Ministry of War Transport (1941-46); Stanhope Steamship Co Ltd (1946-48); Newbigin Steamship Co Ltd (1948-60); Saints Anargyroi Compagnia Ltda (1960-66); Compagnia di Navigazione Patricio (1966); Siconen Shipping SA (1966-67)
- Operator: I Williams & Co Ltd (1941-42); W Fraser, Fenwick & Co Ltd (1942-43); Stanhope Steamship Co Ltd (1942-45); J A Billmeir & Co Ltd (1945-48); E R Newbigin Ltd (1948-60); Ezkos Maritime Technical Co (1960-66); Mooringwell Steamship Co (1966); Kalamotusis Shipbroking Ltd (1966-67)
- Port of registry: (United Kingdom) West Hartlepool (1941-46); (United Kingdom) London (1946-48); (United Kingdom) Newcastle upon Tyne (1948-60); Panama City (1960-67)
- Builder: William Gray & Co Ltd, West Hartlepool
- Yard number: 1115
- Launched: 10 April 1941
- Completed: May 1941
- Out of service: 6 December 1967
- Identification: UK Official Number 160793 (1941-60); Lloyd's Register Number 506219 (1960-67); Code Letters BCKF (1941-48)
- Fate: Sank

General characteristics
- Tonnage: 2,852 GRT; 1,580 NRT
- Length: 310 ft 6 in (94.64 m)
- Beam: 44 ft 4 in (13.51 m)
- Depth: 19 ft 4 in (5.89 m)
- Propulsion: 1 x triple expansion steam engine
- Speed: 9.5 knots (17.6 km/h)

Location of the sinking of Pitsa.

Gripfast was a 2,852 GRT coaster which was built in 1941 as Empire Brook for the Ministry of War Transport (MoWT). She was sold into civil service in 1946 and renamed Stancliffe. She ran aground in 1948 and was declared a constructive total loss, having broken her back. Despite this, she was repaired and saw further service as Gripfast, Capetan Costas P, Karine M and Pitsa before sinking when under tow on 6 December 1967.

== Description ==
Empire Brook was built by William Gray & Co Ltd, West Hartlepool. Her yard number was 1115. Launched on 10 April 1941, she was completed in May 1941.

The ship was 310 feet 6 inches (94.64 m) long, with a beam of 44 feet 4 inches (13.51 m) and a depth of 19 feet 4 inches (5.89 m). She was propelled by a triple expansion steam engine which had cylinders of 20 inches (51 cm), 33 inches (84 cm) and 55 inches (140 cm) bore by 39 inches (99 cm) stroke. The engine was built by the Central Marine Engine Works, West Hartlepool. She had a GRT of 2,852 with an NRT of 1,580.

== Career ==
=== Wartime ===
Empire Brook's port of registry was South Shields. She was initially operated under the management of I Williams & Co Ltd. Management was then transferred to W France, Fenwick & Co Ltd. In 1942, management was transferred to Stanhope Steamship Co Ltd.

Empire Brook was a member of a number of convoys during the Second World War.

MKS 33

Convoy MKS 33 departed Alexandria, Egypt on 2 December 1943 and arrived at Gibraltar on 13 December. Empire Brook was bound for Augusta.

MKS 40

Convoy MKS 40 departed Augusta on 14 April 1944 bound for the United Kingdom. Empire Brook joined the convoy at Bizerta, Tunisia and left it at Algiers, Algeria.

MKS 47

Convoy MKS 47 departed Port Said, Egypt on 19 April 1944 bound for the United Kingdom. Empire Brook joined the convoy at Alexandria and left it at Augusta.

=== Postwar ===
In 1946, Empire Brook was sold to Stanhope Steamship Co Ltd, and was renamed Stancliffe, the third ship of that name for the company. She was operated under the management of J A Billmeir & Co Ltd, London. Her port of registry was changed to London.

On 3 April 1947, Stancliffe ran aground at the entrance to Sharpness Docks, Gloucestershire. Her cargo of 3,000 tons of timber was salvaged, but Stancliffe had broken her back and was declared a constructive total loss. Stancliffe was cut into two pieces, and each was sailed down the River Severn to Cardiff where the ship was repaired. She was sold to Newbigin Steamship Co Ltd, Newcastle upon Tyne and renamed Gripfast. She was operated under the management of E R Newbigin Ltd, Newcastle upon Tyne. Her port of registry was changed to Newcastle upon Tyne.

On 22 October 1951, Gripfast answered a distress call from the Pandora. There was a collision in which Gripfast's propeller was damaged and Pandora was holed. Pandora foundered with the loss of all six crew. The Court of Inquiry found that Pandora would probably have remained afloat longer had she not been in collision with Gripfast.

In 1960, Gripfast was sold to Saints Anargyroi Compagnia Ltda, Panama and renamed Capetan Costas P. She was reflagged to Panama. Capetan Costas P was operated under the management of Ezkos Maritime Technical Co, Greece. In 1966, Capetan Costas P was sold to Compagnia di Navigazione Patricio, Liberia and renamed Karine M. She was operated under the management of Mooringwell Steamship Co, Cardiff. Later that year, she was sold to Siconen Shipping SA, Panama and renamed Pitsa. She was operated under the management of Kalamotusis Shipbroking Ltd, London.

On 10 October 1967, Pitsa put into Djibouti with boiler defects. She was also found to be leaking. On 1 December 1967, Pitsa left Aqaba, Jordan, bound for Colombo, Ceylon under tow from tug Nisos Kerkyra. On 6 December 1967, she sank off Socotra Island, Yemen (13°32′N 55°00′E).

== Official Numbers and Code Letters ==
Official Numbers were a forerunner to IMO Numbers. Empire Brook, Stancliffe and Gripfast had the UK Official Number 168646. Capetan Costas P, Karine M and Pitsa had the Lloyd's Register number 506219. Empire Brook and Stancliffe used the Code Letters BCKF.
