= David Brynmor Anthony =

Welsh-born teacher (1886–1966)

Captain David Brynmor Anthony, World War I

David Brynmor Anthony (28 October 1886 – 24 January 1966), also known as D. Brynmor Anthony, was a Welsh teacher and academic administrator. He received military awards from the Italians, French, and British for his service during World War I.

== Early life and education ==
David Brynmor Anthony was born at Kidwelly, Carmarthenshire, Wales, on 28 October 1886. His parents were Mary (née Harris) and John Gwendraeth Anthony, who was a merchant.

In 1908, Anthony received his degree in French and Romance Philology from University College Wales, Aberystwyth and in 1910, he wrote a dissertation on French Parnassian poets entitled The metrik of the Parnassians towards his M.A. degree at the University of Wales. He studied in France at the Bibliothèque Nationale and the Sorbonne.

== Career and military service ==
While a postgraduate student, Anthony taught in France and then moved to London, where he taught French at Holloway County High School before and briefly after World War I.

During the war, he served with the Royal Welch Fusiliers in Belgium, France, and Italy. He received the Croce di Guerra, Italian Silver Medal of Military Valor, and two Military Crosses and bar for his service. The second Military Cross was awarded "[f]or conspicuous gallantry and devotion to duty in directing and leading a raid. When seen by the enemy he at once gave word to charge, and led the way over the wire himself, killing two of the enemy. He did three daylight patrols, in two of which he fought and beat off ten or fifteen of the enemy, and gained the necessary information. He has shown the greatest courage and skill." He stayed in northern Italy for a period after the war to develop educational programs for Italian soldiers. The University of Florence issued a diploma after he became proficient in the Italian language.

He became the Registrar of the University of Wales in 1921, where he remained until 1945. However, during the war, he served the Friends of Free France in Cardiff as chairman, for which he received the Médaille de Vermeil de la Reconnaissance Française in 1947 by the government of France.

In 1946, he accepted an appointment at the Central Welsh Board as chief inspector, where he worked until his retirement. He died on 24 January 1966.

== Membership and academic awards ==
Anthony became president of the South Wales branch of the Modern Language Association. Due to his interest in art, he was secretary and chairman of the Contemporary Art Society for Wales and at the University of Wales, he served on the art committee. He served the Welsh National School of Medicine as acting secretary in 1931.

The French government nominated him Officier d'Académie in 1936 and he was promoted to Officier de l'Ordre des Palmes Académiques in 1964.

== Personal life ==
Anthony married Doris Musson at the Christ Church Sefton Park in Liverpool on 24 April 1918. Their children were Lois Mary and David Alan Anthony. He was a member of the Presbyterian Church.
