= William Williams (Crwys) =

Welsh poet and Archdruid, called Crwys

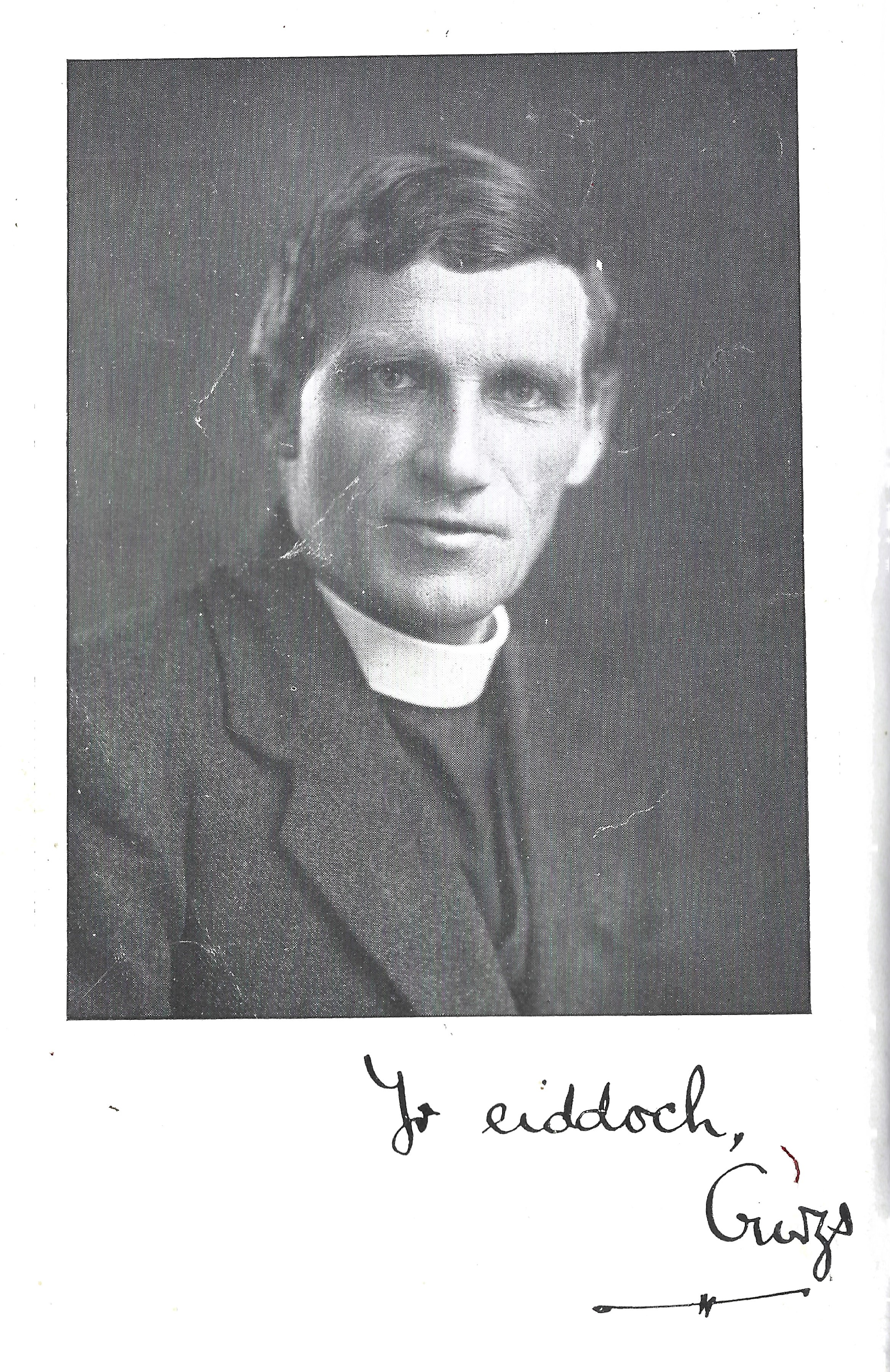
William Crwys Williams

William Williams (4 January 1875 – 13 January 1968), better known by his bardic name of "Crwys", meaning "Cross", was a Welsh poet in the Welsh language. He served as Archdruid of the National Eisteddfod of Wales from 1939 to 1947.

Like all other Archdruids, Crwys had himself won several major prizes at the National Eisteddfod. He was a three-time winner of the crown: at Colwyn Bay in 1910, at Carmarthen in 1911, and at Corwen in 1919. A cast bronze bust in honour of the poet is on display at Carmarthen Castle.

Crwys's work tended to idealise life in rural Wales. His winning poem at the 1911 eisteddfod praised the "common people of Wales". English translations of his work appear in several anthologies.

== Works ==
- Ednyfed Fychan (1910). Inspired by the life of Ednyfed Fychan.
- Dysgub y Dail
- Melin Trefin
- Cerddi Crwys (1920)
- Cerddi Newydd Crwys (1924)
- A brief history of Rehoboth Congregational Church, Bryn-mawr, from 1643 to 1927 (1927)
- Trydydd Cerddi Crwys (1935)
- Mynd a dod (1941)
- Cerddi Crwys, y pedwerydd llyfr (1944)
- Pedair Pennod (1950)

Preceded by John James Williams (poet)	Archdruid of the National Eisteddfod of Wales; 1939–1947	Succeeded by William Evans (Wil Ifan)
