= 1926 in Wales =

- Centuries: 18th; 19th; 20th; 21st
- Decades: 1900s; 1910s; 1920s; 1930s; 1940s
- See also: List of years in Wales; Timeline of Welsh history 1926 in The United Kingdom Scotland Elsewhere

This article is about the particular significance of the year 1926 to Wales and its people.

== Incumbents ==
- Archbishop of Wales – Alfred George Edwards, Bishop of St Asaph
- Archdruid of the National Eisteddfod of Wales – Elfed

== Events ==
- 28 January – Orthopaedic surgeon Robert Jones is created a baronet (Jones of Rhyl).
- 2 February – Spelling of the town of Carnarvon changed to Caernarvon (modern-day Caernarfon); the county makes the same change on 1 July.
- 28 April – J. G. Parry-Thomas breaks the world land speed record on Pendine Sands, in his new car, "Babs".
- 1 May – A lockout of coal miners leads to the declaration of the 1926 United Kingdom general strike. Police and miners clash eighteen times in the course of industrial disputes in the South Wales coalfield.
- June - England footballer Dixie Dean fractures his skull in a motorcycle accident near Holywell but goes on to make a full recovery.
- 23 June – Llwyn-on Reservoir inaugurated for water supply to Cardiff.
- 6 August – Edward, Prince of Wales visits Llandrindod Wells for a scout jamboree.
- October – Miners begin to return to work in large numbers.
- 14 October – David Lloyd George becomes the first Welshman to lead the Liberal Party.
- 29 November – New Jubilee Bridge (Queensferry) across the River Dee is opened.
- unknown dates
  - The first parachute jump from an RAF plane is made at RAF Sealand in Flintshire.
  - Sir William Henry Hoare Vincent represents India at the League of Nations.
  - The Roman amphitheatre at Isca Augusta near Caerleon is excavated by Victor Erle Nash-Williams.

== Arts and literature ==
=== Awards ===
- National Eisteddfod of Wales (held in Swansea)
- National Eisteddfod of Wales: Chair - D. Gwenallt Jones, "Y Mynach"
- National Eisteddfod of Wales: Crown - David Emrys Jones

=== New books ===
- Joseph Alfred Bradney - Memorandum, being an attempt to give a chronology of the decay of the Welsh language in the eastern part of the County of Monmouth
- David Davies - The Influence of the French Revolution on Welsh Life and Literature
- Thomas Mardy Rees - Seth Joshua and Frank Joshua
- Bertrand Russell - On Education, Especially in Early Childhood
- Hilda Vaughan - Here are Lovers

=== Music ===
- David John de Lloyd succeeds Walford Davies as Professor of Music at the University of Wales, Aberystwyth.
- Peter Warlock - Capriol Suite

== Film ==
- Ivor Novello stars in The Triumph of the Rat.

== Broadcasting ==
- The organisers of the National Eisteddfod refuse to allow proceedings to be broadcast on radio.

== Sport ==
- Boxing
  - 5 April - Dick Power beats Tom Norris at Taff Vale Park in Pontypridd to become the new Welsh heavyweight champion.
- Cricket - The South Wales and Monmouthshire Cricket Association is founded.
- Rugby league - Wales defeat New Zealand 34–8.

== Births ==
- 12 January – T. Glynne Davies, poet, novelist and broadcaster (d. 1988)
- 15 January – Malcolm Davies, rugby player (d. 2011)
- 25 January – Richard Davies, actor (d. 2015)
- 3 February – John Davies, cricketer (d. 2005)
- 21 February – Danny Canning, footballer (d. 2014)
- 2 May – Clive Jenkins, trade union leader (d. 1999)
- 8 May – Sir Ronald Waterhouse QC (d. 2011)
- 13 May – Alwyn Davies, chemist (d. 2023)
- 17 May – Tenniel Evans, actor (d. 2009)
- 27 July – Eddie Thomas, boxing champion and manager (d. 1997)
- 30 July – Gareth Alban Davies, poet and Hispanist (d. 2009)
- 1 August – Robert Thomas, sculptor (d. 1999)
- 23 September – Courtenay Meredith, Wales and British Lions rugby player (d. 2024)
- 26 September – Catherine Glyn Davies, historian and translator (d. 2007)
- 2 October (at Clevedon, Somerset) – Jan Morris (as James Morris), author (d. 2020)
- 9 October – Ruth Ellis, murderer (executed 1955)
- 14 December – Margaret John, actress (d. 2011)
- 20 December – Geoffrey Howe, politician (d. 2015)
- 30 December – Clifford Williams, actor and director (d. 2005)

== Deaths ==
- 5 January – John Bryant, harpist
- February – Thereza Dillwyn Llewelyn, astronomer and photographer, 91/92
- 7 February – William Evans Hoyle, director of the National Museum of Wales, 71
- 17 March – Sir David William Evans, lawyer, public servant, and Wales international rugby player, 59
- 16 April – William Lewis, mineralogist, 79
- 20 May (in London) – Thomas Rees, academic, 56
- 24 May – John Williams, royal physician, 85
- 14 June – Rees Thomas, rugby player, 43/44
- 3 August – Ernest Willows, aviation pioneer, 40 (killed in a balloon accident)
- 10 August – John Humphreys Davies, academic, 55
- 20 August – Billy Trew, Wales rugby union captain
- 5 October – Dorothy Tennant (Lady Stanley), artist, 71
- 13 October – Eliseus Williams (Eifion Wyn), poet, 59
- 4 November – John Owen, Bishop of St David's, 72
- 30 November – Ellis Ellis-Griffith, politician, 66

== See also ==
- 1926 in Northern Ireland
