= 1925 in Wales =

- Centuries: 18th; 19th; 20th; 21st
- Decades: 1900s; 1910s; 1920s; 1930s; 1940s
- See also: List of years in Wales; Timeline of Welsh history 1925 in The United Kingdom Scotland Elsewhere

This article is about the particular significance of the year 1925 to Wales and its people.

== Incumbents ==
- Archbishop of Wales – Alfred George Edwards, Bishop of St Asaph
- Archdruid of the National Eisteddfod of Wales – Elfed

== Events ==
- 3 February - An estimated 100,000 people line the streets of Cardiff for the funeral of boxer 'peerless' Jim Driscoll.
- 13 July - The Ammanford anthracite strike begins.
- 5 August - Founding of Plaid Cymru by Lewis Valentine (head of Y Mudiad Cymreig - The Welsh Movement), H. R. Jones (head of the Byddin Ymreolwyr Cymru - The Welsh Home Rule Army) and others at Pwllheli.
- 2 November - After several days of heavy rain, the Llyn Eigiau dam at Dolgarrog on the River Conwy bursts, destroying the village of Porth-llwyd and killing 16 people.
- date unknown
  - Clough Williams-Ellis begins construction of Portmeirion.
  - US newspaper magnate William Randolph Hearst buys the medieval St Donat's Castle in the Vale of Glamorgan for $120,000.
  - R. Silyn Roberts founds the North Wales branch of the Workers Educational Association.

== Arts and literature ==
=== Awards ===
- National Eisteddfod of Wales (held in Pwllheli)
- National Eisteddfod of Wales: Chair - Dewi Morgan (Dewi Teifi), "Cantre'r Gwaelod"
- National Eisteddfod of Wales: Crown - William Evans (Wil Ifan), "Bro Fy Mebyd"

=== New books ===
==== English language ====
- Sir Joseph Alfred Bradney - A Survey of the General History of the Town of Newport and District
- Ifano Jones - Printing and Printers in Wales
- Hilda Vaughan - The Battle to the Weak
- Mortimer Wheeler - Prehistoric & Roman Wales

==== Welsh language ====
- David Rees Davies - Tusw o Flodau
- Edward Tegla Davies - Rhys Llwyd Y Lleuad
- Thomas Davies (Teglyn) - Dinas Mawddwy a'i Hamgylchoedd
- Henry Lewis (ed.) - Cywyddau Iolo Goch ac Eraill
- William David Owen - Madam Wen.
- Kate Roberts (author) - O gors y bryniau (short stories)
- R. Silyn Roberts - Bugail Geifr Lorraine

=== Music ===
- Mai Jones - "Blackbirds"

== Film ==
- 27 July - The first Welsh-made animation series, Jerry the Tyke, is shown through Pathé Pictorials in British cinemas.
- Gareth Hughes appears in The Midnight Girl.
- Ivor Novello appears in The Rat.

== Broadcasting ==
- 14 February - The BBC transmits readings from the poetry of T. Gwynn Jones.
- 22 February - A Welsh-language religious service is broadcast by the BBC.
- 28 February - Saunders Lewis insists on using the Welsh language for his contribution to the BBC series A Welsh Hour.
- 6 March - Readings from the poetry of R. Williams Parry are broadcast by the BBC.
- 3 April - The BBC's Liverpool transmitter broadcasts Noson Gymreig (A Welsh Night).
- 31 May - A bilingual service is broadcast from Cardiff Baptist Chapel.
- 2 October - The BBC broadcasts a talk on the Welsh language from Swansea.

== Sport ==
- Boxing
  - 26 December - Tom Norris beats Dick Power at the Palace Theatre in Crumlin to take the Welsh heavyweight championship.
- Football:
  - 28 February - England defeat Wales 2–1 at the Vetch Field, Swansea.
  - 25 April - Cardiff City reach the FA Cup final, losing 1–0 to Sheffield United
  - 31 October - Scotland defeat Wales 3–0 at Ninian Park.
- The Welsh Lawn Tennis Association is formed.
- Rugby union - Wales finish fourth in the Five Nations Championship with just one win, over France.

== Births ==
- 26 March - Emlyn Hooson, Baron Hooson, lawyer and Liberal politician (died 2012)
- 15 April - Geraint Howells, Liberal politician (died 2004)
- 2 May - Dai Davies, Wales and British Lions international rugby union player (died 2003)
- 1 June - Roy Clarke, footballer (died 2006)
- 10 June - Sir John Stradling Thomas, Conservative politician (died 1991)
- 19 July - Ivor Roberts, television announcer and actor (died 1999)
- 30 July - Don Hayward, Wales international rugby player (died 1999 in New Zealand)
- 7 September - Laura Ashley, designer (died 1985)
- 10 October - Tecwyn Roberts, spaceflight engineer (died 1988 in the United States)
- 3 November - Gordon Parry, Baron Parry, Welsh politician (died 2004)
- 10 November - Richard Burton, born Richard Jenkins, actor (died 1984)
- 24 November - Alun Owen, screenwriter (died 1994)
- 27 November - John Maddox, science writer (died 2009)
- 3 December - Roy John, Wales and British Lions international rugby union player (died 1981)
- 14 December - Ron Stitfall, footballer (died 2008)

== Deaths ==
- 21 January - John Puleston Jones, Methodist minister and author, 62
- 27 January - Francis Grenfell, 1st Baron Grenfell, 83
- 30 January - Jim Driscoll, boxer ("Peerless Jim"), 44
- 4 February - William Haggar, pioneer of the cinema industry, 73
- 18 February - Frank Mills, Wales international rugby player
- 8 June - Edward John Lewis, Wales international rugby union player, 65
- 9 August - J. Vyrnwy Morgan, minister and author, 65
- 26 September - William Bowen, rugby player, 63
- 19 October - David John Thomas, Wales international rugby union, 45
- 4 November - William David Owen, writer, 51
- 16 November - Towyn Jones, politician, 66
- 20 November - Alexandra of Denmark, the queen mother, former Princess of Wales, 80
- 19 December - Elizabeth Phillips Hughes, teacher, 74

== See also ==
- 1925 in Northern Ireland
