= 1923 in Wales =

- Centuries: 18th; 19th; 20th; 21st
- Decades: 1900s; 1910s; 1920s; 1930s; 1940s
- See also: List of years in Wales; Timeline of Welsh history 1923 in The United Kingdom Scotland Elsewhere

Oak bardic chair awarded at the Llangollen Baptist Eisteddfod in 1923.

This article is about the particular significance of the year 1923 to Wales and its people.

== Incumbents ==
- Archbishop of Wales – Alfred George Edwards, Bishop of St Asaph
- Archdruid of the National Eisteddfod of Wales
  - Dyfed (outgoing)
  - Cadvan (incoming)
- Lord Lieutenant of Anglesey – Sir Richard Henry Williams-Bulkeley, 12th Baronet
- Lord Lieutenant of Brecknockshire – Joseph Bailey, 2nd Baron Glanusk
- Lord Lieutenant of Caernarvonshire – John Ernest Greaves
- Lord Lieutenant of Cardiganshire – Herbert Davies-Evans (until 28 December); Ernest Vaughan, 7th Earl of Lisburne (from 28 December)
- Lord Lieutenant of Carmarthenshire – John Hinds
- Lord Lieutenant of Denbighshire – Lloyd Tyrell-Kenyon, 4th Baron Kenyon
- Lord Lieutenant of Flintshire – Henry Gladstone, later Baron Gladstone
- Lord Lieutenant of Glamorgan – Robert Windsor-Clive, 1st Earl of Plymouth (until 6 March); Ivor Windsor-Clive, 2nd Earl of Plymouth (from 12 April)
- Lord Lieutenant of Merionethshire – Sir Osmond Williams, 1st Baronet
- Lord Lieutenant of Monmouthshire – Ivor Herbert, 1st Baron Treowen
- Lord Lieutenant of Montgomeryshire – Sir Herbert Williams-Wynn, 7th Baronet
- Lord Lieutenant of Pembrokeshire – John Philipps, 1st Viscount St Davids
- Lord Lieutenant of Radnorshire – Charles Coltman-Rogers

== Events ==
- 1 January – All major railways in Great Britain are amalgamated into the "Big Four" companies under terms of the Railways Act 1921. The Cambrian Railways and a number of smaller lines and their docks in south Wales are merged into the Great Western Railway and the London and North Western Railway and Midland Railway become part of the London, Midland and Scottish Railway.
- 13 February – The British Broadcasting Company makes its first broadcast in Wales, from "Station 5WA" in Cardiff. Mostyn Thomas opens the programme, singing Dafydd y Garreg Wen and Gwilym Davies becomes the first speaker to broadcast in the Welsh language.
- 7 April – At an Anglesey by-election, Sir Robert Thomas (Liberal) returns to the seat he had previously lost.
- 26 April – In a mining accident at Trimsaran, nine coal miners are killed.
- 1 June – The final stage of the Welsh Highland Railway re-opens.
- 6 August – Ynysangharad War Memorial Park in Pontypridd is dedicated by Field Marshal Viscount Allenby.
- 14 September – Edward Bevan is enthroned as the first Bishop of the new Anglican Diocese of Swansea & Brecon.
- 6 December – In the United Kingdom general election:
  - Ellis Davies returns to Parliament as Liberal MP for Denbigh.
  - David Grenfell is elected unopposed for Labour in Gower.
  - Rhys Hopkin Morris gains Ceredigion for the Independent Liberals (from the Liberals).
  - Thomas Henry Parry retains Flintshire for the Liberals with an increased majority.
- December – Agnes Twiston Hughes becomes the first Welsh woman to qualify as a solicitor.
- date unknown
  - Maurice Jones succeeds Gilbert Joyce as Principal of St David's University College, Lampeter.
  - Sir William Henry Hoare Vincent becomes a member of the Council of India.
  - Coal production at Llay Main Colliery in the North Wales Coalfield begins.

== Arts and literature ==
- 5 February – W. H. Davies marries Helen Payne, an ex-prostitute thirty years his junior, at East Grinstead.
- 30 May – BBC Cardiff (station 5WA) broadcasts the first full performance of a new orchestral opera.
- 6 June – Charles Langbridge Morgan marries Hilda Vaughan.
- W. S. Gwynn Williams becomes Director of Music for the Gorsedd of Bards.

=== Awards ===
- National Eisteddfod of Wales (held in Mold, Flintshire)
- National Eisteddfod of Wales: Chair – D. Cledlyn Davies, "Dychweliad Arthur"
- National Eisteddfod of Wales: Crown – Albert Evans Jones, "Yr Ynys Unig"

=== New books ===
==== English language ====
- Graham John – A Century of Welsh Music
- Thomas Richards – Religious Developments in Wales (1654–1662)

==== Welsh language ====
- Edward Tegla Davies – Gŵr Pen y Bryn
- John Owen – Gwybodaeth y Sanctaidd

=== Music ===
- W. S. Gwynn Williams brings out a new edition of Folk Songs from Anglesey With Pianoforte Accompaniment, with English words by Robert Bryan.

== Film ==
- 14 September - G.A. Cheetham, son of cinema pioneer Arthur Cheetham, films the unveiling of the war memorial at Aberystwyth and other scenes of the life of the town, to be shown in local cinemas.
- Ivor Novello appears in The Man Without Desire, The White Rose and Bonnie Prince Charlie.

== Sport ==
- Boxing
  - 18 June – Jimmy Wilde loses his world flyweight title and retires from the sport.
- Football
  - 5 March – Wales draw 2–2 in their British Home Championship match against England, played at Ninian Park, Cardiff.
- Rugby union
  - 7 December – Old Penarthians RFC is founded.

== Births ==
- 22 February – Bleddyn Williams, rugby player (died 2009)
- 28 February – John Gwilliam, rugby player (died 2016)
- 3 April – John Ormond, poet and journalist (died 1990)
- 21 April – Ronald Cass, film composer (died 2006)
- 25 April – Paul Whitsun-Jones, actor (died 1974)
- 26 July – Bernice Rubens, novelist (died 2004)
- 19 August – Dill Jones, pianist (died 1984)
- 3 September – Robin Williams, broadcaster and essayist (died 2003)
- 22 September – Dannie Abse, poet (died 2014)
- 30 September – Donald Swann, musician (died 1994)
- 1 October – Trevor Ford, footballer (died 2003)
- 5 October – (in South Africa) Glynis Johns, actress (died 2024)
- 13 October – Les Pearce, rugby league player and coach (died 2018)
- 6 November – Donald Houston, actor (died 1991)
- 13 November – Alf Sherwood, footballer (died 1990)
- 21 November – Harry Greene, television D-I-Y expert (died 2013)
- 30 November – John James, historical novelist (died 1993)
- 8 December – Gwilym Prys Davies, Baron Prys-Davies, politician (died 2017)
- 11 December – Denis Brian, Welsh journalist and author (died 2017)
- 19 December – Elwyn Jones, television writer (died 1982)

== Deaths ==
- 9 January – Richard John Lloyd Price, squire of Rhiwlas, 79
- 22 February – John Jenkins, Prime Minister of South Australia, of Welsh parentage, 71
- 6 March
  - General Sir Owen Thomas, politician, 64
  - Robert Windsor-Clive, 1st Earl of Plymouth, Lord Lieutenant of Glamorgan, 65
- 19 March – Evan Rees (Dyfed), poet, 73
- 1 April – Georgiana Rolls, Baroness Llangattock, socialite, benefactor and collector, 86
- 4 May – J. Brynach Davies (Brynach), poet, 49
- 27 May – Charles Lewis, rugby player, 70
- 18 July – Thomas Arthur Lewis, teacher, lawyer and politician, 41
- 12 October – John Cadvan Davies, poet and hymn-writer, 77
- date unknown – Edward Bowen, footballer, 64/65

== See also ==
- 1923 in Northern Ireland
