= 1930 in Wales =

- Centuries: 18th; 19th; 20th; 21st
- Decades: 1910s; 1920s; 1930s; 1940s; 1950s
- See also: List of years in Wales; Timeline of Welsh history 1930 in The United Kingdom Scotland Elsewhere

This article is about the particular significance of the year 1930 to Wales and its people.

== Incumbents ==
- Archbishop of Wales – Alfred George Edwards, Bishop of St Asaph
- Archdruid of the National Eisteddfod of Wales – Pedrog

== Events ==
- 17 March - The South Wales Daily Post and Cambria Daily Leader merge in Swansea.
- 9 May - An elephant from the Monmouth mop fair escapes, and wades in the River Monnow before recapture.
- 13 September - Rhosydd Quarry ceases slate production. Neighbouring Croesor Quarry also closes this year.
- 24 December - In London, Harry Grindell Matthews demonstrates his device to project pictures to the clouds.
- unknown date
  - Production begins at Cefn Coed Colliery, the world's deepest anthracite mine.
  - The Crumlin branch of the Monmouthshire & Brecon Canal is closed.
  - The first youth hostel of the Youth Hostels Association, the first in the UK, is opened at Pennant Hall in the Conwy valley near Llanrwst.
  - A. H. Dodd succeeds Sir John Edward Lloyd as Professor of History at University of Wales, Bangor.
  - Gareth Richard Vaughan Jones becomes Foreign Affairs Secretary to David Lloyd George.
  - John Edward Jones becomes Secretary of Plaid Cymru.
  - Thomas Lewis becomes first chairman of the Medical Research Society.

== Arts and literature ==
- The first Welsh Books Festival is held in Cardiff.
- John Ballinger, first Librarian of the National Library of Wales, is knighted for his services to librarianship.

=== Awards ===
- National Eisteddfod of Wales (held in Llanelli)
- National Eisteddfod of Wales: Chair - David Emrys James, "Y Galilead"
- National Eisteddfod of Wales: Crown - William Jones

=== New books ===
==== English language ====
- David Davies - The Problem of the Twentieth Century
- Saunders Lewis - MonicaKenneth Morris - Book of the Three Dragons
- Bertrand Russell - The Conquest of Happiness
- Hilda Vaughan - Her Father's House
- Edward Williamson - The Story of Llandaff Cathedral

==== Welsh language ====
- Edward Tegla Davies - Y Doctor Bach

=== Music ===
- The Three Valleys Festival is launched.
- Caniedydd Newydd yr Ysgol Sul (collection of hymns)
- Peter Warlock – Carillon Carilla
- Grace Williams - Hen Walia

== Film ==
- Symphony in Two Flats, starring Ivor Novello, an adaptation of Novello's West End play

== Broadcasting ==
- 9 March – The BBC Regional Programme service replaces BBC local stations.

== Sport ==
- Cricket - Maurice Turnbull is the first Welsh player to be capped for England.

== Births ==
- 28 January - David Morris, politician (died 2007)
- 7 February - Peter Jones, sports broadcaster (died 1990)
- 7 March (in London) - Antony Armstrong-Jones, 1st Earl of Snowdon, photographer (died 2017)
- 7 April - Cliff Morgan, rugby player and television presenter (died 2013)
- 10 May - June Knox-Mawer, née Ellis, romantic novelist and radio broadcaster (died 2006)
- 28 June - Edward Millward, politician (died 2020)
- 1 July - Ron Hughes, footballer
- 9 July - Stuart Williams, footballer (died 2013)
- 10 July - Wyn Roberts, Baron Roberts of Conwy, politician (died 2013)
- 14 July - R. H. Williams, rugby player
- 8 August - Terry Nation, screenwriter (died 1997)
- 28 August (in London) - Windsor Davies, actor (died 2019 in France)
- 1 September - Emrys James, actor (died 1989)
- 21 September - John Morgan, comedian (died 2004)
- 23 September - Ellis Evans, academic (died 2013)
- 14 October - Alan Williams, politician (died 2014)
- 19 October - Mavis Nicholson, television presenter (died 2022)
- 11 November - Vernon Handley, conductor (died 2008)
- 12 November - Irma Chilton, children's writer in Welsh and English (died 1990)
- 4 December - Brian Morris, Baron Morris of Castle Morris, poet and critic (died 2001)
- 12 December (in London) - Gwyneth Dunwoody, politician (died 2008)
- date unknown - Aneurin Jones, painter (died 2017)

== Deaths ==
- 18 January - Bobby Lloyd, rugby player, 41
- 26 January - Harry Jones, rugby player, 51
- 25 March - John Gwenogvryn Evans, palaeographer, 78
- 1 May - Richard Bell, politician, 70
- 28 May - Cliff Williams, Wales international rugby union player, 32
- 15 June - John Cynddylan Jones, theologian, 90
- 17 June - Hugh Robert Jones, Nationalist leader, 36
- 22 June - Mary Davies, singer, 75
- 23 June - Ben Davies, Wales international rugby player, 57
- June - David Davies, Archdeacon of Llandaff,
- August - Huw Robert Jones, politician, 35/6
- 15 August - R. Silyn Roberts, author, 59
- 13 September - Jehoida Hodges, rugby player, 53
- 30 September - Lewis Pryce, Archdeacon of Wrexham, 57
- 7 October - Margaret Verney, educationist, 85
- 8 November - William Williams, Dean of St Davids, 82
- 27 December - Alfred Mond, 1st Baron Melchett, industrialist, 62

== See also ==
- 1930 in Northern Ireland
