= 1921 in Wales =

- Centuries: 18th; 19th; 20th; 21st
- Decades: 1900s; 1910s; 1920s; 1930s; 1940s
- See also: List of years in Wales; Timeline of Welsh history 1921 in The United Kingdom Scotland Elsewhere

This article is about the particular significance of the year 1921 to Wales and its people.

== Incumbents ==
- Archdruid of the National Eisteddfod of Wales – Dyfed
- Lord Lieutenant of Anglesey – Sir Richard Henry Williams-Bulkeley, 12th Baronet
- Lord Lieutenant of Brecknockshire – Joseph Bailey, 2nd Baron Glanusk
- Lord Lieutenant of Caernarvonshire – John Ernest Greaves
- Lord Lieutenant of Cardiganshire – Herbert Davies-Evans
- Lord Lieutenant of Carmarthenshire – John Hinds
- Lord Lieutenant of Denbighshire – Lloyd Tyrell-Kenyon, 4th Baron Kenyon
- Lord Lieutenant of Flintshire – Henry Gladstone, later Baron Gladstone
- Lord Lieutenant of Glamorgan – Robert Windsor-Clive, 1st Earl of Plymouth
- Lord Lieutenant of Merionethshire – Sir Osmond Williams, 1st Baronet
- Lord Lieutenant of Monmouthshire – Ivor Herbert, 1st Baron Treowen
- Lord Lieutenant of Montgomeryshire – Sir Herbert Williams-Wynn, 7th Baronet
- Lord Lieutenant of Pembrokeshire – John Philipps, 1st Viscount St Davids
- Lord Lieutenant of Radnorshire – Arthur Walsh, 3rd Baron Ormathwaite
- Archbishop of Wales – Alfred George Edwards, Bishop of St Asaph

== Events ==
- 26 January - The Abermule train collision claims 17 lives, including that of the chairman of the rail company, Lord Herbert Vane-Tempest.
- 18 February - by-election: Ernest Evans becomes Liberal MP for Cardiganshire, winning the seat vacated by Matthew Vaughan-Davies, 1st Baron Ystwyth, on the latter's elevation to the peerage.
- 7 March - Francis Edward Mostyn is appointed Roman Catholic Archbishop of Cardiff.
- 1 April - Alfred Mond becomes Minister of Health.
- 1 April–28 June - Lockout in the coal mining industry; A. J. Cook, the miner's leader, is sentenced to two months’ imprisonment for "inciting to unlawful assembly".
- 4 June - Cardiologist Thomas Lewis is awarded a knighthood in King George V's Birthday Honours.
- December - Leslie Morris becomes a founder member of the Communist Party of Canada.
- date unknown
  - The Anglo-Persian Oil Company Limited begins work on the UK's first oil refinery at Llandarcy.
  - Last copper smelting in the Lower Swansea valley.
  - Hugh Robert Jones founds the Byddin Ymreolaeth Cymru (“Home Rule Army”), which forms the basis for the development of Plaid Cymru.
  - John Bodvan Anwyl is appointed secretary of the Welsh dictionary project sponsored by the Board of Celtic Studies of the University of Wales.

== Arts and literature ==
=== Awards ===
- National Eisteddfod of Wales (held in Caernarfon)
- National Eisteddfod of Wales: Chair - Robert John Rowlands, "Min y Môr"
- National Eisteddfod of Wales: Crown - Albert Evans-Jones

=== New books ===
==== English language ====
- Edwin Sidney Hartland - primitive society
- Evan Frederic Morgan, 2nd Viscount Tredegar - Trial by Ordeal
- Margaret Haig Thomas, Viscountess Rhondda - D. A. Thomas, Viscount Rhondda, by his Daughter and Others
- Francis Brett Young - The Black Diamond

==== Welsh language ====
- Edward Tegla Davies - Tir Y Dyneddon
- John Evan Davies - Blodau'r Grug
- Moelona - Y Wers Olaf

=== New drama ===
- Saunders Lewis - The Eve of St John

=== Music ===
- Ivor Novello & Dion Titheradge - "And Her Mother Came Too"
- The composer Peter Warlock returns to the family home at Cefn-bryntalch Hall, near Abermule, where he will stay until June 1924.

== Film ==
- A teenage Roger Livesey makes his screen debut in The Four Feathers and in the same year appears in a film version of Where the Rainbow Ends.

== Sport ==
- Cricket - Glamorgan CCC is admitted to crickets County Championship competition for the first time.

== Births ==
- 5 February (in Birkenhead) - Marion Eames, novelist (d. 2007)
- 16 February - Bob Evans, rugby union international (d. 2003)
- 19 March - Tommy Cooper, comedian (d. 1984)
- 3 March - David James, cricketer (d. 2002)
- 21 March - Antony Hopkins, composer, pianist, conductor and broadcaster (d. 2014)
- 4 April - Eileen Beasley, teacher and campaigner (d. 2012)
- 9 April - Jack Jones, footballer (d. 2001)
- 6 May - Ted Morris, footballer (d. 2000)
- 21 May - Leslie Norris, poet (d. 2006)
- 28 May - Rhys Probert, aeronautical engineer (d. 1980)
- 4 June - Allen Forward, Wales international rugby union player (d. 1994)
- 8 June - Alwyn Williams, geologist (d. 2004)
- 28 June - R. Tudur Jones, theologian (d. 1998)
- 16 August - Roger Ashton (footballer), footballer (d. 1985)
- 31 August - Raymond Williams, academic and writer (d. 1988)
- 8 September - Sir Harry Secombe, entertainer (d. 2001)
- 13 September - Handel Greville, Wales international rugby union player (d. 2014)
- 15 September - Billy Cleaver, Wales international rugby union player and colliery manager (d. 2003)
- 12 October - Kenneth Griffith, actor and director (d. 2006)
- 3 October – Graham Davies, footballer (d. 2003)
- 18 October – Billy James, footballer (d. 1980)
- 17 December - Ron Davies, photographer (d. 2013)
- 21 December - T. Harri Jones, poet and academic (d. 1965)

== Deaths ==
- 11 February - William Evans (Tonyrefail), minister and author, 82
- 25 February - John Thomas of Llanwrtyd, composer, 81
- 29 April - Billy Matthews, footballer, 37/38
- 6 June - James Havard Thomas, sculptor, 66
- 5 July - Alfred Onions, politician, 62
- 13 July - Emily Davies, educationist, 90
- 21 July - Tom Deacon - Wales international rugby union player
- 27 July
  - John Jones (Myrddin Fardd), author, 85
  - (in London) - James Winstone, miners' leader and politician, 58
- 6 August (in Ilfracombe) - Sir David Brynmor Jones QC, lawyer and historian, 68 or 69
- 23 August (in Oswestry) - Francis Jayne, bishop and academic, 76
- 31 August (in Coorparoo, Queensland) - Thomas Rees, mayor of Brisbane, Australia, 76
- 3 October - William Rhys-Herbert, composer, conductor, organist and pianist, 53
- 9 October - Gwyneth Bebb, lawyer, 31
- 11 October - Willie Thomas, Wales international rugby captain, 55
- 12 November - Edward Windsor Richards, engineer, 90
- 15 December - Hopkin Maddock, Wales international rugby player, 40
- 16 December - Owen Morgan, journalist, 85
- 21 December - Joseph Morewood Staniforth, editorial cartoonist, 57 or 58

== See also ==
- 1921 in Northern Ireland
