= 1927 in Wales =

- Centuries: 18th; 19th; 20th; 21st
- Decades: 1900s; 1910s; 1920s; 1930s; 1940s
- See also: List of years in Wales; Timeline of Welsh history 1927 in The United Kingdom Scotland Elsewhere

This article is about the particular significance of the year 1927 to Wales and its people.

== Incumbents ==
- Archbishop of Wales – Alfred George Edwards, Bishop of St Asaph
- Archdruid of the National Eisteddfod of Wales – Elfed

== Events ==
- 14 January - The British cargo ship Swiftsure collides with another vessel in the Bristol Channel and is beached at Cardiff.
- 27 January - Three men are killed in an explosion at the Dowlais Works, East Moors, Cardiff.
- 4 February - At Pendine Sands, Sir Malcolm Campbell sets a new world land speed record of 174.88 mph (281.44 km/h).
- 5 February - The first ever radio sports commentary from Wales covers the Wales v Scotland rugby union match at Cardiff Arms Park.
- 1 March - In a mining accident at Marine Colliery, Ebbw Vale, 52 miners are killed.
- 3 March - J. G. Parry-Thomas is killed at Pendine, attempting to break Campbell's record (set on 4 February).
- 24 March - The Norwegian cargo ship Verdande leaves Cardiff, bound for Las Palmas, Canary Islands. Five bodies and two lifebelts and some lifeboats would later be washed ashore at Boscastle and Bude, Cornwall, leading to the conclusion that the ship had foundered with the loss of all hands.
- 30 March - The Cardiff trawler Moira is wrecked on the north Cornish coast, drowning seven members of the crew of 12.
- 21 April - King George V opens the first stage of the National Museum of Wales in Cathays Park, Cardiff.
- 23 April - Cardiff City win the FA Cup beating Arsenal 1-0 at Wembley Stadium and taking the trophy out of England for the first time.
- 29 June - A total eclipse of the sun is 98% visible in Cardiff despite clouds.
- 21 July - Pontsticill Reservoir is opened by Lord Buckland.
- c. September - The highest railway in the British Isles is constructed at the Grwyne Fawr reservoir in Powys.
- 3 September - Coleg Harlech, founded by Thomas Jones (T. J.), opens. Its aims resemble those of a modern community college.
- 5 September - Kathleen Thomas becomes the first person to swim the Bristol Channel, swimming from her home town of Penarth to Weston-super-Mare in a time of 7 hours 20 minutes.
- 18 September - The 'Red Sunday in Rhondda Valley' demonstration calls for a protest march on London.
- 28 October - A storm severely and permanently damages a long section of the track of the Pwllheli and Llanbedrog Tramway, the last horse-drawn tram service in Great Britain.
- 8 November - 270 South Wales people join a hunger march in protest against the Ministry of Health who refused and limited the relief notes given to unemployed miners and their families.
- 25 December - A Christmas Day blizzard affects Cardiff and much of South Wales.

== Arts and literature ==
- John Dyfnallt Owen becomes editor of Y Tyst.

=== Awards ===
- National Eisteddfod of Wales (held in Holyhead)
- National Eisteddfod of Wales: Chair - withheld
- National Eisteddfod of Wales: Crown - Caradog Prichard

=== New books ===
- Edward Tegla Davies - Hen Ffrindiau
- Rhys Davies - The Withered Root
- William Meloch Hughes - Ar Lannau’n Camwy (posthumously published)
- Wil Ifan - O Ddydd i Ddydd
- Moelona - Cwrs y Lli

=== Drama ===
- Idwal Jones - Pobl yr Ymylon

=== Music ===
- Henry Walford Davies becomes organist at St George's Chapel, Windsor.
- Mai Jones - "Wondering if you remember" (song)

== Film ==
- Ivor Novello appears in the Hitchcock films, The Lodger: A Story of the London Fog and Downhill.

== Broadcasting ==
- 15 January - The first-ever radio commentary on a team game in the UK is given during the England v Wales rugby union international at Twickenham.

== Sport ==
- The Welsh Baseball Union is founded.
- Boxing
  - 24 April - Gipsy Daniels wins the British light-heavyweight championship.
  - 9 July - Tosh Powell beats Johnny Edmunds to become the new Welsh bantamweight champion.
  - Frank Moody wins the British lightweight and middleweight titles.
- Football
  - 23 April - For the only time in its history, the FA Cup is won by a non-English team – Cardiff City F.C., who defeat Arsenal 1-0 in the first broadcast final.
  - Abergavenny Thursdays F.C. is formed.
- Recreational swimming
  - Pontypridd Outdoor Lido is opened in Ynysangharad War Memorial Park.

== Births ==
- 12 January - Richard Bebb, actor (d. 2006)
- 8 February - Sir Stanley Baker, actor (d. 1976)
- 2 March - Ray Prosser, Wales and British Lion rugby player (d. 2020)
- 25 April – Ernest Zobole, artist (d. 1999)
- 3 May – Stanley Saunders, educator and musician
- 11 May – Bernard Fox, actor (d. 2016)
- 5 June - Tommy Harris, rugby player (d. 2006)
- 14 June - Elaine Hugh-Jones, pianist and composer
- 22 July - John Tripp, poet (d. 1986)
- 4 July – Patricia Kern, mezzo-soprano (d. 2015)
- 15 July - Caerwyn Roderick, Labour politician (d. 2011)
- 30 July - Jocelyn Hay, née Board, broadcasting campaigner (d. 2014)
- 24 August - Glyn Davies, Wales international rugby union player (d. 1976)
- 20 September - Rachel Roberts, actress (d. 1980)
- 7 November - Ivor Emmanuel, singer and actor (d. 2007)
- 19 November - Cliff Curvis, British and Commonwealth boxing champion (d. 2009)
- 2 December - Jimmy Sangster, screenwriter (d. 2011)
- 7 December - Helen Watts, opera singer (d. 2009)

== Deaths ==
- 14 February (in Paris) - Isambard Owen, educationist, 76
- 5 February - Frances Hoggan, first registered woman doctor in Wales, 83
- 10 February - Walter Jenkin Evans, academic, 70
- 3 March - J. G. Parry-Thomas, engineer and racing driver, 42 (accident)
- 20 April - Frank Hill, Wales international rugby captain, 61
- 10 May - Francis Edwards, politician, 75
- 22 June - Ralph Champneys Williams, colonial governor (b. 1848)
- 8 July - George Frederick Harding, Wales international rugby player (b. 1858)
- 29 July - Freddie Welsh (Frederick Hall Thomas), boxer (b. 1886)
- 13 August - Tom Williams, rugby union player, 39/40
- 22 August - Edward Douglas-Pennant, 3rd Baron Penrhyn, politician, 63
- 1 September - William John Parry, author and political activist, 84
- 10 September - William Thelwall Thomas, surgeon,
- 18 September - Joe Johns, Welsh lightweight boxing champion, 35
- 29 September - Thomas Charles Williams, minister, 59
- 10 October - Harland Bowden, engineer and politician, 54
- 16 October - Evan Roberts, Wales international rugby player, 66
- 4 November - Beriah Gwynfe Evans, author, 79
- 14 December - Alfred Thomas, 1st Baron Pontypridd, 87
- 26 December - Jack Whitfield, Wales rugby union captain, 35

== See also ==
- 1927 in Northern Ireland
