= 1929 in Wales =

- Centuries: 18th; 19th; 20th; 21st
- Decades: 1900s; 1910s; 1920s; 1930s; 1940s
- See also: List of years in Wales; Timeline of Welsh history 1929 in The United Kingdom Scotland Elsewhere

This article is about the particular significance of the year 1929 to Wales and its people.

== Incumbents ==
- Archbishop of Wales – Alfred George Edwards, Bishop of St Asaph
- Archdruid of the National Eisteddfod of Wales – Pedrog

== Events ==
- 6 January - The abbey on Caldey Island is handed over by the Benedictine order to its new owners, Belgian Cistercians.
- February - 700 people are involved in a riot at Cwmfelinfach, when strikebreakers are used during an industrial dispute at the Nine Mile Point Colliery.
- 13 March - Former ironclad warship HMS Warrior (1860) is towed to Pembroke Dock to finish her service with the Royal Navy as an oil fuelling hulk.
- 24–26 April - The Royal Air Force's Squadron Leader Arthur G. Jones-Williams and Flight Lieutenant Norman H. Jenkins make the first non-stop flight from Britain to India.
- 30 May - In the United Kingdom general election:
  - Megan Lloyd George becomes Liberal MP for Anglesey – the first female MP in Wales.
  - Aneurin Bevan becomes MP for Ebbw Vale.
  - Other newly elected MPs include John Jestyn Llewellin at Uxbridge and Robert Richards at Wrexham.
  - Lewis Valentine is Plaid Cymru’s first parliamentary candidate. Plaid Cymru obtain a total of 609 votes in Wales.
  - J. H. Thomas becomes Lord Privy Seal in the new government.
- 9 July - After a collision with another vessel, HMS L12, the Royal Navy submarine H47 sinks off the Pembrokeshire coast, killing 21 crewmen.
- 10 July - Nine miners are killed in a mining accident at Milfraen, Blaenavon.
- 11 November - 8.3 inches (210 mm) of rain falls within a single day at Lluest-wen Reservoir, a record for a place in Wales. Below in the Rhondda this month, 400 people are made homeless by flooding.
- 25 November - Cargo steamer Molesey is wrecked on Skomer Island with the loss of 7 lives; British Movietone News shoots the first-ever sound footage of such an event.
- 28 November - Seven miners are killed in an accident at Wernbwll Colliery, Penclawdd.
- date unknown
  - The University of Wales begins awarding teacher training certificates at colleges of education in Wales.
  - The number of motor vehicles in Wales exceeds 100,000 for the first time.

== Arts and literature ==
- The first Urdd National Eisteddfod is held, at Corwen Pavilion.

=== Awards ===
- National Eisteddfod of Wales (held in Liverpool)
- National Eisteddfod of Wales: Chair - David Emrys Jones, "Dafydd ap Gwilym"
- National Eisteddfod of Wales: Crown - Caradog Prichard, "Y Gân Ni Chanwyd"

=== New books ===
==== English language ====
- John Hugh Edwards - David Lloyd George, the Man and the Statesman
- Richard Hughes - A High Wind in Jamaica
- Elisabeth Inglis-Jones - Starved Fields
- Huw Menai - The Passing of Guto
- Bertrand Russell - Marriage and Morals

==== Welsh language ====
- Ambrose Bebb - Llydaw
- Kate Roberts - Rhigolau Bywyd

=== Music ===
- W. Bradwen - Paradwys y Bardd
- David John de Lloyd - Forty Welsh Traditional Tunes (arrangements)

== Film ==
- Ray Milland appears in his first Hollywood films.

== Broadcasting ==
- Welsh-language radio begins to be broadcast from the BBC's Daventry transmitter.

== Sport ==
- Football - The Football Association of Wales makes its first overseas tour, to Canada.
- Rugby Union
  - 23 February - 1929 Wales beat France 8–3 at the National Stadium in Cardiff

== Births ==
- 2 January - John Lansdown, computer graphics pioneer (died 1999)
- 28 January - Clem Thomas, Wales and British Lions international rugby player (died 1996)
- 14 February - Wyn Morris, conductor (died 2010)
- 20 March - Herbert Wilson, physicist and biophysicist (died 2008)
- 25 April - Malcolm Thomas, Wales international rugby union captain (died 2012)
- 20 May - Bobi Jones, author (died 2017)
- 11 August - Alun Hoddinott, composer (died 2008)
- 2 September - Victor Spinetti, actor (died 2012)
- October - Robyn Léwis, politician and archdruid (died 2019)
- 16 October - Ivor Allchurch, Wales international footballer (died 1997)
- 20 October - Colin Jeavons, actor
- 27 October - Alun Richards, novelist (died 2003)
- 2 November - Carwyn James, rugby coach (died 1983)
- 7 November - Urien Wiliam, dramatist (died 2006)
- 4 December - Ednyfed Hudson Davies, politician (died 2018)
- 30 December - Charles Lynn Davies, Wales international rugby player
- date unknown
  - Paul Ferris, author
  - John Morgan, journalist and broadcaster (died 1988)

== Deaths ==
- 2 January - David James, Wales international rugby player, 62
- 15 January - William Boyd Dawkins, geologist and historian, 91
- 20 February - Henry Bruce, 2nd Baron Aberdare, 77
- 16 April - Sir John Morris-Jones, poet and grammarian, 64
- 29 April - Violet Herbert, Countess of Powis, 63
- 30 April - Cliff Bowen, Wales international rugby player and county cricketer, 54
- 13 May - David Thomas (Afan), composer, 47
- 15 May - Grace Rhys, writer, wife of Ernest Rhys, 64
- 30 May - Owen Davies, Baptist minister and writer, 68/9
- 2 June - Fred Andrews, Wales international rugby player, 64
- 15 June - Llewellyn Atherley-Jones, politician, 78/79
- 23 July - John Hinds, businessman and politician, Lord Lieutenant of Carmarthenshire, 65
- 29 August - Viv Huzzey, Wales international rugby union player, 53
- 6 September - Richard Ellis, bibliographer and librarian, 62
- 19 October - John Evan Davies, Calvinistic Methodist minister and writer, 79
- 20 November - David Williams, archdeacon of Cardigan, 88
- 7 December - Jenkin Jones, trade union leader, 70
- 17 December - Arthur G. Jones-Williams, aviation pioneer, 31 (air crash)
- 21 December - James Williams, hockey player, 51
- date unknown - John Evan Davies, minister and writer, 78/9

== See also ==
- 1929 in Northern Ireland
