= 1918 in Wales =

- Centuries: 18th; 19th; 20th; 21st
- Decades: 1890s; 1900s; 1910s; 1920s; 1930s
- See also: List of years in Wales; Timeline of Welsh history 1918 in The United Kingdom Scotland Elsewhere

This article is about the particular significance of the year 1918 to Wales and its people.

== Incumbents ==
- Archdruid of the National Eisteddfod of Wales – Dyfed
- Lord Lieutenant of Anglesey – Sir Richard Henry Williams-Bulkeley, 12th Baronet
- Lord Lieutenant of Brecknockshire – Joseph Bailey, 2nd Baron Glanusk
- Lord Lieutenant of Caernarvonshire – John Ernest Greaves
- Lord Lieutenant of Cardiganshire – Herbert Davies-Evans
- Lord Lieutenant of Carmarthenshire – John Hinds
- Lord Lieutenant of Denbighshire – Lloyd Tyrell-Kenyon, 4th Baron Kenyon (from 24 January)
- Lord Lieutenant of Flintshire – Henry Gladstone, later Baron Gladstone
- Lord Lieutenant of Glamorgan – Robert Windsor-Clive, 1st Earl of Plymouth
- Lord Lieutenant of Merionethshire – Sir Osmond Williams, 1st Baronet
- Lord Lieutenant of Monmouthshire – Ivor Herbert, 1st Baron Treowen
- Lord Lieutenant of Montgomeryshire – Sir Herbert Williams-Wynn, 7th Baronet
- Lord Lieutenant of Pembrokeshire – John Philipps, 1st Viscount St Davids
- Lord Lieutenant of Radnorshire – Powlett Milbank (until 30 January); Arthur Walsh, 3rd Baron Ormathwaite (from 5 April)
- Bishop of Bangor – Watkin Williams
- Bishop of Llandaff – Joshua Pritchard Hughes
- Bishop of St Asaph – A. G. Edwards (later Archbishop of Wales)
- Bishop of St Davids – John Owen

== Events ==
- January – Coalowner, Liberal politician and Minister of Food Control David Alfred Thomas is created Viscount Rhondda; following his death on 3 July the title passes by special remainder to his daughter, the suffragette Margaret Mackworth.
- 26 January – An Irish steamship, the Cork, is torpedoed by a U-boat off Point Lynas in Anglesey. Twelve crew are killed.
- 29 January – The steamship Ethelinda is torpedoed by a U-boat off the Skerries. Twenty-six crew are killed.
- 4 February – The steamship Treveal is torpedoed by a U-boat off the Skerries. Thirty-three people are killed.
- 5 February – The steamship Mexico City is torpedoed by a U-boat off South Stack, Holyhead. Twenty-nine crew are killed.
- March
  - Miners' leader A. J. Cook is imprisoned for sedition under the Defence of the Realm Act 1914 for his public opposition to the war.
  - Submarines HMS R5 and HMS R6 are laid down at HM Dockyard Pembroke Dock; as with HMS L34 and L35 ordered later in the year, they will be cancelled in 1919 before completion.
- 2 March – The British submarine HMS H5 is rammed and sunk, having been mistaken for a U-boat, off Porthdinllaen. All twenty-six crew are killed.
- 7 March – The steamship Kenmare is torpedoed by a U-boat off the Skerries. Twenty-six crew are killed.
- 7 April – The steamship Boscastle is torpedoed by a U-boat off Strumble Head. Eighteen crew are killed.
- 21 April – The steamship Landonia is torpedoed by a U-boat off Strumble Head. Twenty-one crew are killed.
- 9 May – The steamships Baron Ailsa and Wileysike are torpedoed by a U-boat off Pembrokeshire. Fourteen crew are killed.
- 19 May – The German U-boat SM UB-119 is sunk, perhaps off Bardsey Island.
- 15 June – The steamship Strathnairn is torpedoed by a U-boat off Bishops and Clerks, Pembrokeshire. Twenty-one crew are killed.
- 22 August – The steamship Palmella is torpedoed by a U-boat off South Stack, Holyhead. Twenty-eight people are killed.
- 16 September – The steamship Serula is torpedoed by a U-boat off Strumble Head. Seventeen crew are killed.
- 18 September – The 38th (Welsh) Division is involved in the Battle of Épehy.
- Autumn – Edward Thomas John (Liberal MP for East Denbighshire) defects to the Labour Party.
- 10 October – Three seamen are killed while returning to their ship by boat at Milford Haven.
- 14 October – The steamship Dundalk is torpedoed by a U-boat off the Skerries. Twenty-one crew are killed.
- 11 November – Armistice Day. Able Seaman Richard Morgan, serving aboard HMS Garland, is the last Welshman – and perhaps the last Briton – to be killed on active service in the First World War, in the course of which over 40,000 Welsh people have lost their lives.
- 15 November – The British submarine HMS H51 is launched at Pembroke Dock.
- 14 December – United Kingdom general election:
  - For the first time, a woman stands as a parliamentary candidate in Wales: Millicent Mackenzie stands unsuccessfully for the University of Wales, itself a new parliamentary seat (which is won by Herbert Lewis).
  - Home Rule for Wales is included as a policy in the manifesto of the Labour Party.
  - William Brace becomes Labour MP for Abertillery.
  - Alfred Onions becomes Labour MP for Caerphilly.
  - John Hugh Edwards becomes Liberal MP for Neath, his previous constituency of Mid Glamorganshire having been abolished.
  - Sir Robert Thomas, 1st Baronet, becomes Liberal MP for Wrexham.
  - David Sanders Davies becomes Liberal MP for Denbigh, standing against Edward Thomas John.
- December – The beginning of the 1918 flu pandemic which lasts into the following year and kills about 10,000 people in Wales.

== Arts and literature ==
- John Morris-Jones is knighted for his services to literature.
- August is fixed as the annual month of the National Eisteddfod of Wales.

=== Awards ===
- National Eisteddfod of Wales (held in Neath)
- National Eisteddfod of Wales: Chair – John Thomas Job
- National Eisteddfod of Wales: Crown – D. Emrys Lewis

=== New books ===
- W. H. Davies – A Poet's Pilgrimage
- David Delta Evans – The Rosicrucian
- Moelona – Rhamant y Rhos

=== Music ===
- Walford Davies is appointed director of music to the Royal Air Force.

== Film ==
- The Life Story of David Lloyd George (drama, not shown publicly until 1996)

== Sport ==
- Baseball – First records of the Grange Gasworks Ladies team playing in Cardiff.

== Births ==
- 15 January – Billy Lucas, international footballer (died 1998)
- 6 March – Billy Hughes, footballer (died 1981)
- 7 May – Robert Davies, politician (died 1967)
- 9 May – Sir Kyffin Williams, artist (died 2006)
- 20 May – David Ormsby-Gore, 5th Baron Harlech (died 1985)
- 24 May – Jack Edwards, soldier and activist (died 2006)
- 28 May
  - James Eirian Davies, Methodist minister and poet (died 1998)
  - Mary Vaughan Jones, children's author (died 1983)
- 6 June – Susan Williams-Ellis, founder of Portmeirion Pottery (died 2007)
- 19 June – Ivor Griffiths, footballer (died 1993)
- 4 July – Tony Garrett, chairman of Imperial Tobacco (died 2017)
- 25 July – Dennis David, RAF ace (died 2000)
- 19 August – Dilys Elwyn Edwards, composer (died 2012)
- 19 September – Penelope Mortimer, writer (died 1999)
- 26 September – John Rankine, author (died 2013)
- 14 October – J. A. G. Griffith, lawyer and academic (died 2010)
- 19 October – Charles Evans, doctor and mountaineer (died 1995)
- 3 November – Glyn Williams, international footballer (died 2011)

== Deaths ==
- 2 January – Rupert Morris, clergyman and teacher, 74
- 30 January – Powlett Milbank, Lord Lieutenant of Radnorshire, 65
- 15 February – William Evans, judge, c.71
- 13 April
  - David Ffrangcon Davies, baritone, 62
  - Thomas Tannatt Pryce, VC recipient, 32 (killed in action)
- 24 May – Evan Williams, US-born tenor of Welsh parentage, 50 (blood poisoning)
- 3 July – David Alfred Thomas, 1st Viscount Rhondda, industrialist and politician, 62
- 13 September – Samuel Thomas Evans, MP, 59
- 21 September – Emily Charlotte Talbot, heiress, 78
- 27 September – Morfydd Llwyn Owen, composer, pianist and mezzo-soprano, 26 (medical complications)
- 15 October – William David Phillips, Wales international rugby player, 63
- 16 October – Robert Williams, architect and social campaigner, 70
- 4 November – Wilfred Owen, poet from the Welsh borders, 25 (killed in action)
- 25 November – William Griffith, mining engineer who worked with Cecil Rhodes, 65
- 30 November – Lewis Richards, footballer and barrister, 57
- 1 December
  - John Griffiths, artist, 81
  - Fred Perrett, Wales international rugby union player, 27 (died of wounds received in action)

== See also ==
- 1918 in Ireland
