= 1922 in Wales =

- Centuries: 18th; 19th; 20th; 21st
- Decades: 1900s; 1910s; 1920s; 1930s; 1940s
- See also: List of years in Wales; Timeline of Welsh history 1922 in The United Kingdom Scotland Elsewhere

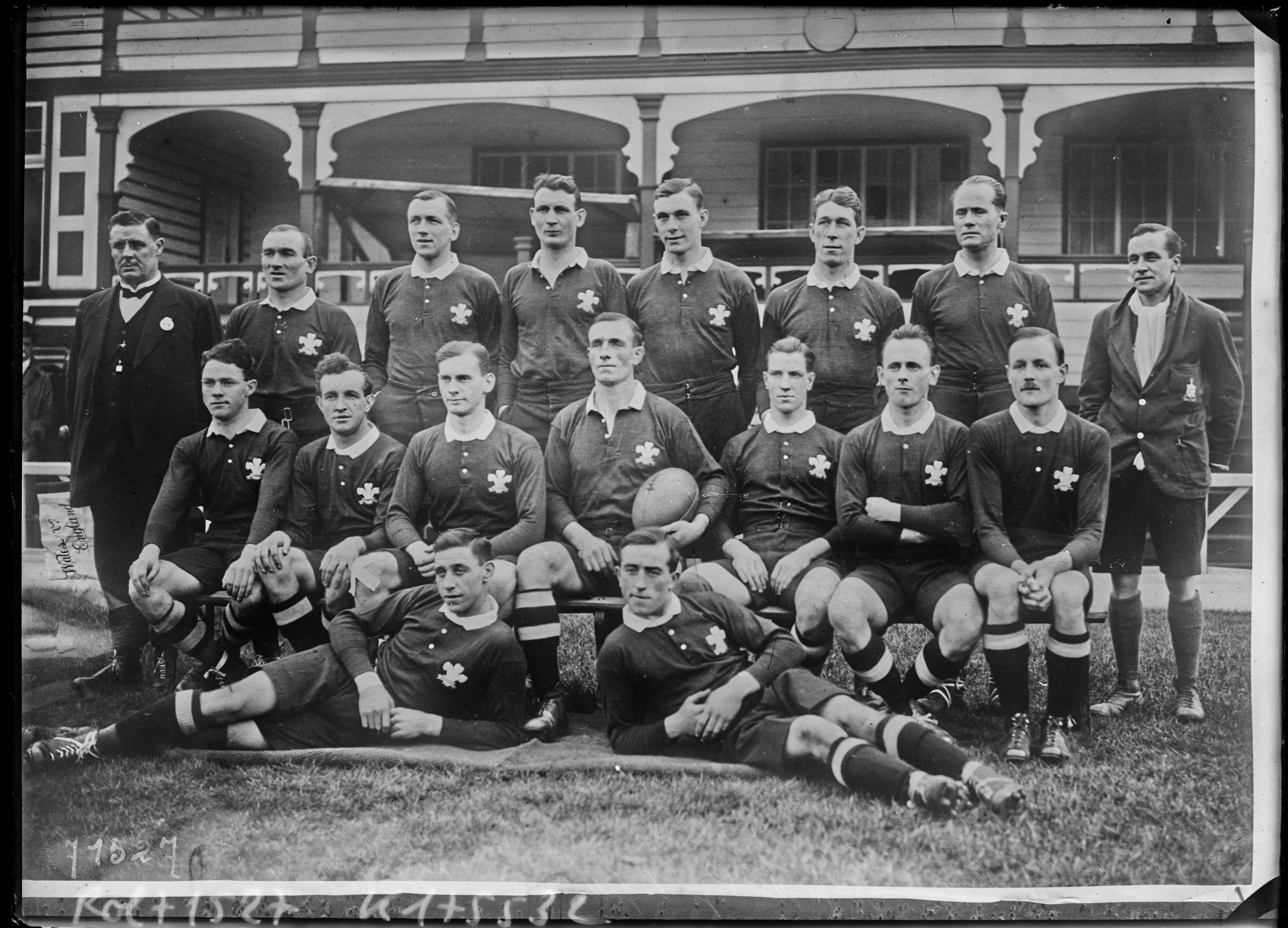
Photo of a welsh rugby team in 1922

This article is about the particular significance of the year 1922 to Wales and its people.

== Incumbents ==
- Archbishop of Wales – Alfred George Edwards, Bishop of St Asaph
- Archdruid of the National Eisteddfod of Wales – Dyfed
- Lord Lieutenant of Anglesey – Sir Richard Henry Williams-Bulkeley, 12th Baronet
- Lord Lieutenant of Brecknockshire – Joseph Bailey, 2nd Baron Glanusk
- Lord Lieutenant of Caernarvonshire – John Ernest Greaves
- Lord Lieutenant of Cardiganshire – Herbert Davies-Evans
- Lord Lieutenant of Carmarthenshire – John Hinds
- Lord Lieutenant of Denbighshire – Lloyd Tyrell-Kenyon, 4th Baron Kenyon
- Lord Lieutenant of Flintshire – Henry Gladstone, later Baron Gladstone
- Lord Lieutenant of Glamorgan – Robert Windsor-Clive, 1st Earl of Plymouth
- Lord Lieutenant of Merionethshire – Sir Osmond Williams, 1st Baronet
- Lord Lieutenant of Monmouthshire – Ivor Herbert, 1st Baron Treowen
- Lord Lieutenant of Montgomeryshire – Sir Herbert Williams-Wynn, 7th Baronet
- Lord Lieutenant of Pembrokeshire – John Philipps, 1st Viscount St Davids
- Lord Lieutenant of Radnorshire – Arthur Walsh, 3rd Baron Ormathwaite (until 20 January); Charles Coltman-Rogers (from 20 January)

== Events ==
- 1 January - The Rhondda and Swansea Bay Railway is incorporated into the Great Western Railway.
- 25 January - A letter written by Ifan ab Owen Edwards to the children's periodical Cymru'r Plant results in establishment of the Welsh youth organisation Urdd Gobaith Cymru.
- February - The last fighting ship completes fitting out and commissioning at Pembroke Dock, Royal Navy light cruiser HMS Capetown.
- 26 April - The last ship is launched from Pembroke Dock, Royal Fleet Auxiliary tanker Oleander.
- 18 October - In a by-election at Newport, caused by the death of Liberal MP Lewis Haslam, Reginald Clarry wins the seat for the Conservatives.
- 22 October - David Lloyd George is replaced by Bonar Law as Prime Minister of the United Kingdom, after the Conservatives leave the Coalition Government.
- 23 December - Cargo ship Maid of Delos sinks in St George's Channel off Skomer with all 26 crew killed.

== Arts and literature ==
- Wilfred Mitford Davies sets up the first Welsh children's book publisher, Cymru'r Plant.
- The Gregynog Press is established by the sisters Margaret and Gwendoline Davies (granddaughters of Victorian industrialist David Davies) of Gregynog Hall.
- The University of Wales Press is established.

=== Awards ===
- National Eisteddfod of Wales (held in Ammanford)
- National Eisteddfod of Wales: Chair - J. Lloyd-Jones, "Y Gaeaf"
- National Eisteddfod of Wales: Crown - Robert Beynon, "Y Tannau Coll"

=== New books ===
==== English language ====
- J. O. Francis - Cross Currents (play)
- Henry Jones - A Faith that Enquires
- Arthur Machen - The Secret Glory

==== Welsh language ====
- D. Ambrose Jones - Llenyddiaeth a Llenorion Cymreig y bedwaredd ganrif ar bymtheg
- J. Glyn Davies Cerddi Huw Puw

=== Music ===
- 10 October - Contralto Leila Megane makes the first recording of Sir Edward Elgar's Sea Pictures, with Elgar himself conducting.
- Walford Davies is knighted for his services to music.

== Film ==
- The Last King of Wales, starring Charles Ashton
- Lyn Harding makes an early screen appearance in When Knighthood Was in Flower.
- Ivor Novello stars in The Bohemian Girl

== Broadcasting ==
- Preparations begin for the start of radio broadcasting by the BBC in Cardiff; the first broadcast will take place in February 1923.

== Sport ==
- Rugby union - Wales wins the Five Nations championship.
- Football (soccer)
  - Cardiff City FC win the Welsh Cup
  - Porth F.C. win the Welsh Football League, but are suspended from the SWMFA for failing to pay their debts.
  - Garden Village Football Club is formed.

== Births ==
- 2 January – D. Geraint James, physician (d. 2010)
- 15 January – Emlyn Davies, rugby international (d. 2016)
- 16 February – Sir Geraint Evans, opera singer (d. 1992)
- 14 March – Colin Fletcher, pioneering backpacker and writer (d. 2007)
- 24 March – Arthur "Waring" Bowen, solicitor and charity worker
- 16 April
  - (in London) Kingsley Amis, novelist associated with Swansea (d. 1995)
  - Rees Stephens, Welsh international rugby union captain (d. 1998)
- 21 April – Allan Watkins, England Test cricketer (d. 2011)
- 7 May
  - Gwyn Hughes, footballer (d. 1999)
  - Monica Jones, lecturer in English literature, a lover of Philip Larkin (d. 2001)
- 11 June – Tom Cole, Welsh-American racing driver (d. 1953)
- 26 June – William Griffiths, hockey player (d. 2010)
- 4 July (in the United States) – Phyllis Kinney, expert on Welsh folk music (d. 2026)
- 18 July
  - Ray Cale, dual code international rugby player (d. 2006)
  - Ray Lambert, footballer (d. 2009)
- 20 July – Ruth Bidgood (née Jones), poet (d. 2022)
- 10 August – Bert Evans, Welsh-American footballer (d. 2008)
- 12 September – Arthur Daniels, rugby league player (d. 2001)
- 3 October – Hugh James, aviator (d. 2015)
- 31 October – Talfryn Thomas, comedy actor (d. 1982)
- 18 December – Maldwyn Jones, historian (d. 2007)
- 22 December – Eryl Davies, teacher and school inspector (d. 1982)
- date unknown
  - Thomas Nathaniel Davies, painter (d. 1996)
  - Denis Griffiths, tenor (d. 2001)

== Deaths ==
- 29 January – George Owen, footballer, 56
- 4 February – Sir Henry Jones, philosopher, 69
- 25 February – Mary Jane Evans, teacher, preacher and actress, 34
- 9 April – Constance Jones, English-born philosopher and educator, 74
- 22 April – W. Llewelyn Williams, lawyer and historian, 55
- 3 May – Dick Kedzlie, Wales international rugby player, 59
- 14 May – William Abraham ("Mabon"), politician, 79
- 16 May – Thomas Powel, Celtic scholar, 76/77
- 2 June – Sir John David Rees, politician, 67
- 20 June – John Williams, politician, 60
- 8 July – James Bevan Edwards, army officer and politician, 86
- 6 August – Thomas Pryce-Jenkins, Wales international rugby player, 60
- 12 August – Arthur Griffith, Irish-born nationalist politician of Welsh descent, 50
- 22 August – John Bryn Edwards, ironmaster, 33
- 12 September – George Rowles, Wales international rugby player, 56
- 28 September – Charlie Newman, Wales rugby union captain, 65
- 21 December – William Morris (Rhosynnog), Baptist minister, 79
- 25 December – Percy Jones, former world boxing champion, 29
- 27 December – Thomas William Rhys Davids, Pali scholar, 79

== See also ==
- 1922 in Northern Ireland
