= 1924 in Wales =

- Centuries: 18th; 19th; 20th; 21st
- Decades: 1900s; 1910s; 1920s; 1930s; 1940s
- See also: List of years in Wales; Timeline of Welsh history 1924 in The United Kingdom Scotland Elsewhere

This article is about the particular significance of the year 1924 to Wales and its people.

== Incumbents ==
- Archbishop of Wales – Alfred George Edwards, Bishop of St Asaph
- Archdruid of the National Eisteddfod of Wales – Elfed
- Lord Lieutenant of Anglesey – Sir Richard Henry Williams-Bulkeley, 12th Baronet
- Lord Lieutenant of Brecknockshire – Joseph Bailey, 2nd Baron Glanusk
- Lord Lieutenant of Caernarvonshire – John Ernest Greaves
- Lord Lieutenant of Cardiganshire – Ernest Vaughan, 7th Earl of Lisburne
- Lord Lieutenant of Carmarthenshire – John Hinds
- Lord Lieutenant of Denbighshire – Lloyd Tyrell-Kenyon, 4th Baron Kenyon
- Lord Lieutenant of Flintshire – Henry Gladstone, later Baron Gladstone
- Lord Lieutenant of Glamorgan – Ivor Windsor-Clive, 2nd Earl of Plymouth
- Lord Lieutenant of Merionethshire – Sir Osmond Williams, 1st Baronet
- Lord Lieutenant of Monmouthshire – Ivor Herbert, 1st Baron Treowen
- Lord Lieutenant of Montgomeryshire – Sir Herbert Williams-Wynn, 7th Baronet
- Lord Lieutenant of Pembrokeshire – John Philipps, 1st Viscount St Davids
- Lord Lieutenant of Radnorshire – Charles Coltman-Rogers

== Events ==
- 22 January - Ramsay MacDonald, MP for Aberavon, becomes the first Labour Prime Minister of the UK. J. H. Thomas becomes his Secretary of State for the Colonies and Vernon Hartshorn Postmaster General of the United Kingdom.
- April - David Ivon Jones becomes the only Welshman ever to be given a state funeral in the Soviet Union.
- 26 May - Harry Grindell Matthews fails to convince the War Office of the efficacy of his new invention, the "death ray".
- July - Harry Grindell Matthews reveals that he has lost the sight in one eye through the effects of his experiments.
- 23 October - Formal opening of new Guildhall, Swansea, designed by Percy Thomas in stripped classical style and incorporating the Brangwyn Hall.
- 29 October - In the 1924 United Kingdom general election:
  - The Welsh electorate is 1,289,924
  - Of 36 Welsh MPs, eight are elected unopposed.
  - MacDonald loses his position as Prime Minister
  - Only one female candidate stands for election in Wales.
  - Newly elected MPs include Walter D'Arcy Hall (Brecon and Radnor), Henry Arthur Evans (Cardiff South), Alfred Mond (returning to Parliament as MP for Carmarthen) and Walter Runciman (Swansea West).
  - Ernest Evans defeats George Maitland Lloyd Davies to win the University of Wales seat for the Liberals.
- 14 December - Earthquake centred on Corwen.
- Ronald Lockley and Bertram Lloyd estimate that there are 25 to 30 pairs of "Welsh parrots" (puffins) on Cardigan Island.
- Freddie Welsh meets and spars with F. Scott Fitzgerald; the encounter would eventually give rise to a theory that Fitzgerald used Welsh as a model for The Great Gatsby.

== Arts and literature ==
- August - Artist and designer Eric Gill moves with some of his artistic community from Ditchling in England to the disused Llanthony Abbey at Capel-y-ffin.
- 4 September - Goscombe John's Carmarthen County War Memorial is unveiled in Carmarthen.
- A rare handled beaker is found during archaeological excavations at a Bronze Age burial cairn in the Black Mountains.

=== Awards ===
- National Eisteddfod of Wales (held in Pontypool)
- National Eisteddfod of Wales: Chair - Albert Evans Jones, "I Duw Nid Adwaenir"
- National Eisteddfod of Wales: Crown - Edward Prosser Rhys

=== New books ===
- Edward Morgan Humphreys - Yr Etifedd Coll
- Saunders Lewis - A School of Welsh Augustans
- Arthur Machen - The London Adventure
- R. Williams Parry - Yr Haf a cherddi eraill
- R. Silyn Roberts - Gwyntoedd Croesion

=== Music ===
- Grace Davies - Second Collection of Folk Songs from Anglesey

== Film ==
- The Prince of Wales is filmed attending the National Eisteddfod in Pontypool by British Pathé
- Cinematographer Claude Friese-Greene visits Cardiff, Chepstow and Raglan in the course of his drive from John O'Groats to Land's End
- "Turn Out of the Cardiff Fire Brigade"

== Broadcasting ==
- 15 January - The world's first radio play, Danger by Richard Hughes (set in a collapsed Welsh coal mine), is broadcast by the British Broadcasting Company from its studios in London, incidentally including the first broadcast words of Welsh when "Ar Hyd y Nos" is sung.
- May - The BBC broadcasts the first in a series of 18 Welsh-language lessons.
- 31 July - Broadcast of extracts from Y Pwyllgor, a play by D. T. Davies.
- 12 December - The first transmission is made from the 5SX radio relay station in Swansea. The studio is opened by the Mayor of Swansea.

== Sport ==
- Boxing - Johnny Jones wins the Welsh flyweight boxing championship by beating Gus Legge in Treorchy.
- Football - 49-year-old Billy Meredith becomes the oldest man ever to play in an FA Cup semi-final.

== Births ==
- 11 January – Jack Parry, footballer (d. 2010)
- 5 February – Leo Callaghan, soccer referee (d. 1987)
- 9 February – George Guest, organist and choirmaster of St John's College, Cambridge (d. 2002)
- 29 February – Frank Vining, potter (d. 1989)
- March – Glenys Cour, artist
- 2 March – Ted Gorin, footballer (d. 2013)
- 4 March – David Oswald Thomas, philosopher (d. 2005)
- 15 March – Tom Ellis, politician (d. 2010)
- 4 April – Emrys Evans, banker (d. 2004)
- 6 May – Laurie Webb, actor (d. 2026)
- 26 May – John Stone, actor (d. 2007)
- 2 June – Peter Halliday, actor (d. 2012)
- 7 June – Donald Watts Davies, computer scientist (d. 2000)
- 6 July – Donald Pelmear, actor (d. 2025)
- 7 July – Albert Stitfall, footballer (d. 1998)
- 17 September – Islwyn Ffowc Elis, author (d. 2004)
- 25 October – Rex Willis, Wales rugby union international and British Lion (d. 2000)
- 8 November – Bernard Ross, footballer (d. 1999)
- 20 November – Timothy Evans, victim of wrongful execution (d. 1950)
- 22 November – Donald Gullick, rugby player (d. 2000)
- 24 November – Derek Williams, rugby player (d. 2014)
- 4 December – Shirley Paget, Marchioness of Anglesey, public servant and writer (d. 2017)
- 12 December – Dennis Powell, boxer (d. 1993)
- 14 December – Margaret John, actress (d. 2011)

== Deaths ==
- 1 January – John Morgan, Archdeacon of Bangor, 83
- 6 January – Henry Hill, cricketer, 78
- 19 January – Edwin Cross, footballer, 75
- 20 January – Aneurin Williams, politician, 64
- 19 March – John Richard Williams (J. R. Tryfanwy), poet, 56
- 2 June – (in Oswestry) William Griffith Thomas, influential clergyman, 63
- 14 June – George Frederick Harris, portrait and landscape painter, 67
- 5 July – William Pritchard Morgan, industrialist, 80
- 19 July – Jack Evans, Wales national rugby player, 53
- 6 August – John Roberts (Pencerdd Gwynedd), organist and composer, 76
- 20 September – Caradoc Rees, politician, 66
- 12 December – Charlie Arthur, Wales international rugby player
- 12 December – Mostyn Evan, Welsh-descended Australian lawyer and sports administrator, 83

== See also ==
- 1924 in Northern Ireland
