= The Soldier and the Gentlewoman =

1932 novel by Hilda Vaughan

- First edition (US)
- Author: Hilda Vaughan
- Cover artist: R. W.
- Language: English
- Publisher: Victor Gollancz (UK); Charles Scribner's Sons (US)
- Publication date: 1932
- Publication place: United Kingdom
- Media type: Print (hardback and paperback)
- ISBN: 9781909983113 2014 re-print, Honno Press

The Soldier and the Gentlewoman is a 1932 novel by Welsh English-language writer Hilda Vaughan.
