= The Invader (novel) =

1928 novel by Hilda Vaughan

First edition (US)

The Invader: A Tale of Adventure and Passion is a novel by the Welsh author Hilda Vaughan. It was published in 1928 by Heinemann in the UK and by Harper & Brothers in the US.

== Synopsis ==
Daniel Evans, a tenant farmer, is forced out of his farm when Miss Webster inherits it from her uncle. Through his tenacity, he attempts to regain his farm.

== Publication ==
The Invader was Vaughan's third novel.

Her husband, Charles Langbridge Morgan, persuaded her to delay its publication, on the grounds that her writing would improve.

== Reception ==
The novel was well received, and was described by Country Life as "one of the best novels of this year".

== Sources ==
- Thomas, Lucy (December 2008). The Fiction of Hilda Vaughan (1892–1985): Negotiating the Boundaries of Welsh Identity (PDF) (PhD thesis). University of Cardiff.
