= Jack Jones (footballer, born 1921) =

Welsh footballer

Personal information
- Full name: John Jones
- Date of birth: 9 April 1921
- Place of birth: Wrexham, Wales
- Date of death: 2001 (aged 79–80)
- Place of death: Wrexham, Wales
- Position: Inside forward

Senior career*
Years	Team	Apps	(Gls)
1946–1948	Wrexham	20	(1)
1948–1949	Doncaster Rovers	6	(0)
1949–1951	New Brighton	77	(11)
- Ellesmere Port Town
- * Club domestic league appearances and goals

John Jones (9 April 1921 – May 2001) was a Welsh professional footballer who played as an inside forward. He made appearances in the English Football League with Wrexham, Doncaster Rovers and New Brighton.
