= John Bryant (harpist) =

Welsh harpist (1832 -1926)

John Bryant (1 Feb 1832 – 5 Jan 1926) was a Welsh harpist. He was born in Castellau, Llantrisant, Glamorganshire. As a competent player of the pedal harp he attended and performed at many Eisteddfodau and concerts in South Wales, he also served as adjudicator on some occasions.

He is known to have arranged various ‘Merch Megan’ variations for the harp.

He died in early 1926, and is buried in the graveyard of Tabernacl, Efail Isaf.
