= The Battle to the Weak =

Novel by Hilda Vaughan

The Battle to the Weak is a novel by Welsh-born writer Hilda Vaughan.

== Publication ==
The Battle to the Weak was Vaughan's first novel, published in 1925.

== Reception ==
According to Christopher Newman, though her literary technique would develop throughout her career, The Battle to the Weak contains "virtually all the themes developed in her later works", especially those of duty and self-sacrifice. The novel was very favourably received, with reviews noting the accomplished character of the work, in spite of it being her first. The Western Mail said of it "Wales depicted truly at last."
