= Thomas Charles Williams =

Thomas Charles Williams (28 August 1868 – 29 September 1927) was a Welsh Calvinistic Methodist minister, who served as Moderator of the denomination's General Assembly.

== Life ==
Williams, who was born on 28 August 1868 in Gwalchmai, Anglesey, north Wales, was the son of a Welsh Anglican priest; his mother's father, and four of her brothers, were also clergymen. He studied at Jesus College, Oxford, graduating in 1897, and later obtained a Doctorate of Divinity degree from the University of Edinburgh. After leaving Oxford, he moved to Menai Bridge and served as the minister of the Calvinistic Methodist church there until his death on 29 September 1927.

He preached in both English and Welsh, and served as Moderator of the North Wales Calvinistic Methodist Association (1918–19) and as Moderator of the General Assembly of the Calvinistic Methodists (1921–22).
