= William David Owen =

Welsh writer

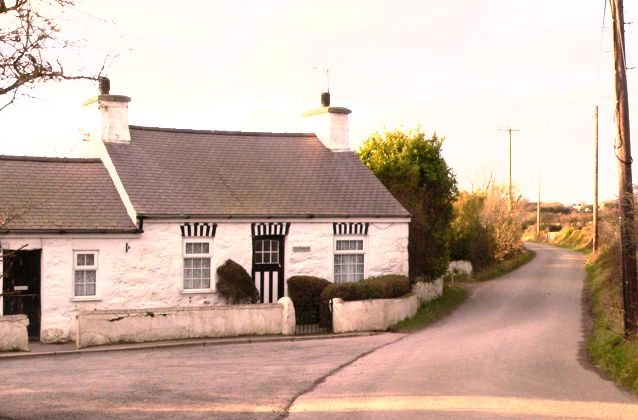
Ty Frannan, birthplace of author W. D. Owen

William David Owen (21 October 1874 – 4 November 1925), born William Owen, was a Welsh writer best known for his novel Madam Wen (White Lady).

== Early life ==
Owen was born at Ty Franan in Bodedern, Anglesey. He initially studied to be a teacher in Bangor, leading to him teaching in Clay Cross in Derbyshire, before studying law. Following a period of illness he returned to Anglesey and took up writing, contributing to a brochure advertising Rhosneigr.

== Publications ==
Madam Wen was published in book form in 1925, but it had first appeared as a serial in the Welsh-language newspaper y Genedl Gymraeg (The Welsh Nation) in 1914. The first printed English edition of the story was published in an abridged form in October 2009, in a biographical work about the author by T. T. M. Hale, entitled The Rhosneigr Romanticist. There had been an earlier English translation of Madam Wen, which was handwritten and bound into a book by one named Richard Parry in 1937.

== Decease and family ==
William David Owen died in 1925, barely two weeks after his novel was first published.

Owen was survived by his wife, Gwen (née Empsall), his mother Jane, and two sisters, Ellen and Sarah. Ellen had worked for Florence Nightingale between 1885 and 1892, as her cook and housekeeper.
