= Here are Lovers =

Romantic novel by Hilda Vaughan

Here are Lovers is a 1926 novel by Welsh author Hilda Vaughan.

== Synopsis ==
Laetitia Wingfield, daughter of the Anglicised Squire Wingfield, is rescued by Gronwy Griffith, the son a Welsh tenant farmer.

== Publication ==
Here are Lovers was Vaughan's second novel, published in the summer of 1926.

== Sources ==
- Thomas, Lucy (2008). "The Fiction of Hilda Vaughan (1892–1985): Negotiating the Boundaries of Welsh Identity". PhD Thesis. University of Cardiff. 12 Mar. 2014.
