= William Evans (judge) =

Welsh judge and legal writer

William Evans (1846 or 1847 – 15 February 1918) was a Welsh judge and legal writer.

== Life ==
Evans was the third son of James Evans of Merthyr Tydfil, south Wales. He matriculated at the University of Oxford in 1868 at the age of 21 as a non-collegiate student, transferring to Jesus College, Oxford in 1869. He obtained two BA degrees: Literae Humaniores in 1872 (3rd class) and Jurisprudence in 1873 (4th class). He was called to the Bar by Inner Temple in 1874. He was a member of the Wales and Chester Circuit and went on commissions to France, Spain and Australia. He wrote on legal topics, including the law of principal and agent, and also on the poetry of Wales. He was appointed as a county court judge in 1897, assigned to mid-Wales. He died whilst sitting at Oswestry County Court on 15 February 1918.
