= Ivor Wynne Jones =

Welsh journalist

Ivor Wynne Jones (1927 – 1 April 2007) was a Welsh journalist and a noted historian.

Wynne Jones was born in the Liverpool suburb of Allerton. He served in World War II as a paratrooper, and later joined the Forces Broadcasting Service in Jerusalem. Finally, he worked in broadcasting in Cyprus before returning to the UK in 1948.

Jones was editor of the Caernarvon and Denbigh Herald before joining the Liverpool Daily Post, to which he contributed for 52 years. He was the paper's chief foreign correspondent. His weekly column, which continued to appear until two months before his death, was entitled "Forthright and Fearless".

He was also a founder member of the Lewis Carroll Society in 1969.

He died in hospital at Colwyn Bay aged 80 and the funeral was on 10 April at Llanrhos, Llandudno. He was survived by his wife, Jeanette, son Mervyn, an army spokesman in Northern Ireland, daughter Sian and two grandchildren.

== Works ==
- Llandudno Regina, the Queen of Welsh Resorts (1973)
- Shipwrecks of North Wales (1986)
- The Llechwedd Strike of 1893 (1993)
- Colwyn Bay: a Brief History (1995)
- Gold, Frankincense and Manure (1997)
- Alice's Welsh Wonderland (1999)
- Hitler’s Celtic Echo
- Victorian Slate Mining (2003)
