= John Davies (Welsh cricketer) =

Welsh cricketer (1926–2005)

John Davies (3 February 1926 – 1 April 2005) was a Welsh cricketer. He was a right-handed batsman and a leg-break bowler who played for Glamorgan. He was born in Pontypridd and died in Llantrisant.

Davies played club cricket for Pontypridd, Ludlow, and the Forty Club. Davies played for Glamorgan Second XI between 1952 and 1957.

Davies made a single first-class appearance for the side, during the 1952 season, against Worcestershire. From the upper-middle order, he scored 11 runs in the first innings in which he batted, and a duck in the second.
