= Mercer Simpson =

Mercer Frederick Hampson Simpson (27 January 1926 – 11 June 2007), was an English-born writer who spent most of his life in Wales.

He was born in Fulham, London, and educated at King Edward VI School, Bury St Edmunds. He served in the Royal Marines during World War II, and afterwards studied at Magdalene College, Cambridge. In 1950, having trained as a teacher, he moved to Cardiff, where he spent most of the rest of his life. In 1967 he was appointed a lecturer at what later became the University of Glamorgan. He was active in Welsh literary circles, and was a contributor and editor of several anthologies.

- East Anglian Wordscapes (1993)
- Rain from a Clear Blue Sky (1994)
- Early Departures, Late Arrivals (2006);

== Sources ==
- Independent obituary
