= Gareth Jones (rugby union, born 1979) =

Welsh rugby union footballer

- Born: Gareth Jones; 4 December 1979 Pontypridd, Wales, UK
- Died: 16 June 2008 (aged 28) University Hospital of Wales, Cardiff, Wales, UK
- Height: 5 ft 7 in (1.70 m)
- Weight: 11 st 10 lb (74 kg)

Rugby union career
- Position: Scrum-half
Amateur team(s)
Years	Team	Apps	(Points)
- Glyncoch
- Correct as of p
Senior career
Years	Team	Apps	(Points)
2004–2006	Pontypridd		
2006–2008	Neath		

Gareth Jones (4 December 1979 – 16 June 2008) was a Welsh rugby union player who played as a scrum-half for Neath rugby club until his death in 2008.

== Club career ==
Jones started his career with Glyncoch and then progressed to play for Beddau and Pontypridd, before making his debut for Neath in 2006 against Newport. He was also a part-time decorator.

== Death ==
After sustaining an injury to his neck during a game against Cardiff in the Premier Division in a ruck on 20 April 2008, Jones was taken to the University Hospital of Wales for treatment. During his time there, he received operations and treatment to help with his injury, but died on the afternoon of 16 June.
