= 2008 in Wales =

- Centuries: 19th; 20th; 21st
- Decades: 1980s; 1990s; 2000s; 2010s; 2020s
- See also: List of years in Wales; Timeline of Welsh history 2008 in The United Kingdom England Scotland Elsewhere Welsh football: 2007–08 • 2008–09

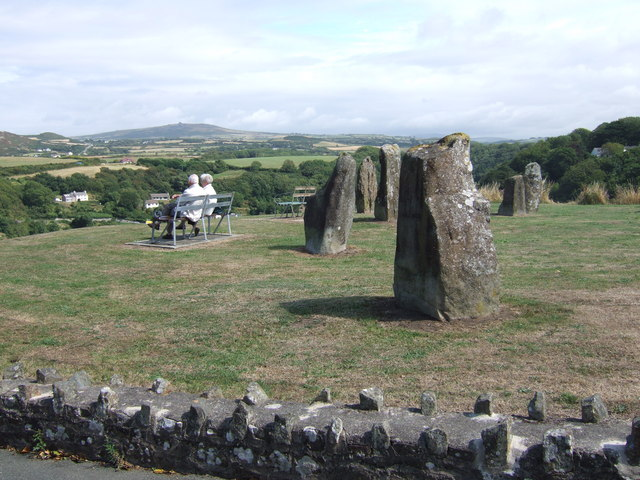
The Gorsedd circle of stones in Fishguard, associated with the 1936 eisteddfod and a historic visit by Augustus John and Dylan Thomas

This article is about the particular significance of the year 2008 to Wales and its people.

== Incumbents ==
- First Minister – Rhodri Morgan
- Secretary of State for Wales
  - Peter Hain (to January 24)
  - Paul Murphy
- Archbishop of Wales – Barry Morgan, Bishop of Llandaff
- Archdruid of the National Eisteddfod of Wales
  - Selwyn Iolen (outgoing)
  - Dic Jones (incoming)

== Events ==
- 18 January – Last working of Tower Colliery, the last deep mine in the South Wales Valleys (official closure: 25 January).
- 24 January – Peter Hain resigns from his government offices (including Secretary of State for Wales) after the Electoral Commission refers to the Metropolitan Police his failure to report donations amounting to £100,000.
- 25 January – Official closure of Tower Colliery in the Cynon Valley, the last deep coal mine to be worked in Wales.
- 11 February – At the 50th Grammy Awards in Los Angeles, California, the Grammy Award for Best Opera Recording goes to Hansel and Gretel, starring Rebecca Evans.
- 18 February – Plans to publish Wales's first daily newspaper in the Welsh language, under the title Y Byd (The World), are abandoned because of inadequate finance.
- 1 March (St David's Day)
  - Soprano Helen Field gives the broadcast première of Alun Hoddinott's Serenissima on BBC Radio 3, shortly before the composer's death.
  - Cardiff sees record-breaking numbers march in the annual St David's Day parade, from National Museum Cardiff to the Senedd in Cardiff Bay.
- 7 March – Queen Elizabeth II of the United Kingdom visits Swansea to open its new leisure centre, a replacement for the building she opened in 1977.
- 16 April
  - Swansea's new bowls stadium hosts the World Indoor Singles and Mixed Pairs Championship for bowls.
  - First minister Rhodri Morgan officially opens Amazon.co.uk's 400,000 sq ft (37,000 m^{2}) Fulfilment Centre in Jersey Marine.
- 1 May – All Wales local council elections.
- 31 May – Swansea Bay Film Festival begins.
- 12 June – Cardiff Castle opens a new interpretation centre at a cost of £6 million.
- 13 June – While taking part in BBC Radio Cymru's weekly radio show, Dau o'r Bae, Alun Cairns apologises for referring to Italians as "greasy wops".
- 14 June – In the 2008 Birthday Honours list, Russell T Davies is awarded the OBE and Joe Calzaghe the CBE.
- 28 June – At the Wales Book of the Year Awards, Heritage Minister Rhodri Glyn Thomas reads out the wrong name, and runner-up Tom Bullough arrives on stage only to find he has lost out to Dannie Abse. Bullough comments "The Book of the Year event was out-and-out the worst night of my life."
- 18 July – Rhodri Glyn Thomas resigns from his position in the Welsh Assembly Government after having been reprimanded for smoking in a pub.
- July – North East Wales Institute of Higher Education, based at Wrexham, is renamed Glyndŵr University.
- 2 August – The National Eisteddfod of Wales opens in Cardiff.
- 11 August – A resurvey of Mynydd Graig Goch in the Moel Hebog group of Snowdonia summits determines its height to be 2,000 ft 6in (609.75m) rather than the 1998 ft (609m) previously recorded, qualifying it as a mountain.
- 12 September – The Tower, Meridian Quay, is topped out, becoming the tallest building in Swansea and the tallest residential building in Wales.
- 5 October – Delyth Morgan, Baroness Morgan of Drefelin, replaces Kevin Brennan as Lords Minister for the Department for Children, Schools and Families.
- 20 November – AM and Heritage Minister Alun Ffred Jones makes history by using the Welsh language for the first time as a representative of the UK government at a European Union meeting in Brussels.
- 14 December – Trinity College, Carmarthen, announces negotiations with University of Wales, Lampeter, with a view to a merger.
- 19 December – A haul of 22 million counterfeit cigarettes, the biggest such seizure ever in Wales, is recovered by Cardiff customs officers in a container from Dubai.
- 31 December – In the New Year Honours 2009, Michael Sheen is awarded the OBE and Owain Arwel Hughes the CBE. Cyclists Nicole Cooke and Geraint Thomas receive the MBE.

== Arts and culture ==
- Gillian Clarke succeeds Gwyn Thomas as National Poet of Wales.

=== Awards ===
- Glyndŵr Award – Tudur Dylan Jones
- National Eisteddfod of Wales: Chair – Hilma Lloyd Edwards
- National Eisteddfod of Wales: Crown – Hywel Griffiths
- National Eisteddfod of Wales: Prose Medal – Mererid Hopwood
- National Eisteddfod of Wales: Drama Medal – Glesni Hâf Jones, Dŵr Mawr Dyfn
- Gwobr Goffa Daniel Owen: Bet Jones, Craciau
- Wales Book of the Year:
  - English language: Dannie Abse – The Presence
  - Welsh language: Gareth Miles – Y Proffwyd a'l Ddwy Jesebel
- Dylan Thomas Award: Nam Le
- Cân i Gymru: Aled Myrddin – "Atgofion"

=== New books ===
- The Academi – Encyclopaedia of Wales / Gwyddoniadur Cymru
- Geraint Talfan Davies – At Arm's Length: Recollections and Reflections on the Arts, Media and a Young Democracy
- Rhys Evans – Gwynfor Evans: a Portrait of a Patriot
- Ray Gravell – Grav in his Own Words
- Simon Jenkins – Wales: Churches, Houses, Castles
- Peter Lord – Winifred Coombe Tennant: a Life through Art (National Library of Wales)
- Iolo Morganwg and the Romantic Tradition in Wales: The Correspondence of Iolo Morganwg, Vols 1, 2 & 3 (ed. Geraint H. Jenkins, Ffion Mair Jones & David Ceri Jones)
- Ian Skidmore – Kyffin: a Figure in a Welsh Landscape
- Dai Smith – Raymond Williams: a Warrior's Tale
- Louie Myfanwy Thomas (d. 1968) writing as Jane Ann Jones – Pererinion
- Rowan Williams – Dostoevsky: Language, Faith and Fiction

=== Music ===
==== Classical ====
- Alun Hoddinott – Music for String Quartet
- Karl Jenkins – Stabat Mater

==== Albums ====
- The Automatic – This Is a Fix
- Duffy – Rockferry
- The Gentle Good – While You Slept I Went Out Walking
- Katherine Jenkins – Sacred Arias
- Kids in Glass Houses – Smart Casual
- Bryn Terfel – First Love: Songs from the British Isles

==== Singles ====
- Feeder – Miss You

== Film ==
- Jonathan Pryce appears in Leatherheads.
- Michael Sheen plays David Frost in Frost/Nixon
- Catherine Zeta-Jones stars in Death Defying Acts
- Freebird is filmed and set in Wales.
- Flick, starring Faye Dunaway, is filmed in Wales.

== Broadcasting ==
=== Welsh-language TV ===
- Natur Cymru (with Iolo Williams)
- Noson Chis a Meinir

=== English-language TV ===
- Teen Tribes (with Rhod Gilbert) (BBC2)
- The Wright Taste

== Sport ==
- BBC Wales Sports Personality of the Year – Shane Williams
- BBC Young Sports Personality of the Year – Eleanor Simmonds
- Cycling
  - March – Geraint Thomas is a member of the gold medal-winning team in the UCI Track Cycling World Championships - Men's Team Pursuit.
  - September – Nicole Cooke wins the UCI Road World Championships - Women's Road Race.
- Darts
  - Mark Webster wins the 2008 BDO World Darts Championship.
- Football
  - 9 March – Cardiff City F.C. defeat Middlesbrough F.C. to reach the semi-finals of the FA Cup for the first time since 1927.
  - 6 April – Cardiff City F.C. defeat Barnsley F.C. to reach the final of the FA Cup for the first time since 1927.
  - 17 May – Cardiff City F.C. are defeated by Portsmouth F.C. in the final of the FA Cup
  - 16 August – Opening round of the Welsh Cup 2008-09
- Rugby union
  - 2 February – Wales defeat World Cup finalists England in their first match of the 2008 Six Nations Championship.
  - 8 March – Wales defeat Ireland to clinch the Triple Crown.
  - 15 March – Wales defeat France to win the Grand Slam for the second time in five years.
  - 12 April – Ospreys defeat Leicester Tigers and lift the EDF Energy Cup trophy.
- 2008 Summer Olympics
  - 10 August – Cyclist Nicole Cooke wins the gold medal in the Women's road race.
  - 16 August – In rowing, Tom James wins a gold medal as one of the British team's victorious coxless four.
  - 18 August – Cyclist Geraint Thomas wins gold as a member of the GB Team Pursuit team.
  - 21 August – David Davies of Barry wins the silver medal in the Men's marathon 10 kilometre swim.

== Deaths ==
- 1 January –
  - Aled Rhys Wiliam, writer, 81
  - Laura Mattan, wife of Mahmood Hussein Mattan, the last man to be hanged at Cardiff Prison, who campaigned to have his wrongful conviction overturned, 78
- 4 February – Peter Thomas, Baron Thomas of Gwydir, politician, 87
- 8 March – Patrick Gibbs, RAF Wing Commander, author and film critic, 92
- 12 March – Alun Hoddinott, composer, 78
- 18 March – Philip Jones Griffiths, photojournalist, 72
- 24 March – Neil Aspinall, Beatles' friend and assistant, 65
- 12 April (in Heywood, Greater Manchester) – Dai Royston Bevan, rugby player, 80
- 17 April – Gwyneth Dunwoody, politician, 77
- 25 April – Humphrey Lyttelton, jazz musician and former Port Talbot steelworker, 86
- 1 May – Mark Kendall, footballer, 49
- 19 May – Dai Davies, sports journalist, 69
- 28 May – Elinor Lyon, English children's novelist who retired to Harlech, 86
- 12 June – Derek Tapscott, international footballer, 75
- 16 June – Gareth Jones, rugby player, 28
- 22 June – Ron Stitfall, footballer, 82
- 30 June – Anthony Crockett, Bishop of Bangor, 62
- 14 July – George Noakes, former Archbishop of Wales, 83
- 12 August (in London) – Michael Baxandall, art historian, 74
- 18 August – Bob Humphrys, TV sports presenter, 56
- 20 August – Leo Abse, politician, 91
- 10 September – Vernon Handley, conductor, 77
- 7 October – Leslie Hardman, rabbi, 95
- 22 October – George Edwards, footballer, 87
- 27 October – Colin Gale, footballer, 76
- 12 November – Richard Rhys, 9th Baron Dynevor, 73
- 7 December – John Ellis Williams, novelist, 84

== See also ==
- 2008 in Northern Ireland
