= 2007 in Wales =

- Centuries: 19th; 20th; 21st
- Decades: 1980s; 1990s; 2000s; 2010s; 2020s
- See also: List of years in Wales; Timeline of Welsh history 2007 in The United Kingdom England Scotland Elsewhere Welsh football: 2006–07 • 2007–08

This article is about the particular significance of the year 2007 to Wales and its people.

== Incumbents ==
- First Minister – Rhodri Morgan
- Secretary of State for Wales – Peter Hain
- Archbishop of Wales – Barry Morgan, Bishop of Llandaff
- Archdruid of the National Eisteddfod of Wales – Selwyn Iolen

== Events ==
- 2 January – A survey finds that eight of the top ten "unhealthiest places to live" in the UK are in Wales, with Merthyr Tydfil leading the list.
- 12 January – Welsh actor Michael Sheen is nominated for a BAFTA award for Best Supporting Actor in a Film (for his performance as Tony Blair in The Queen).
- 16 January – It is announced that a £14 billion training academy for all three armed forces is to be built at St Athan in south Wales. (The project was scrapped three years later.)
- 30 January – Connie Fisher wins the Critics' Circle Most Promising Newcomer Award.
- 1 February – Travel Magazine names Oxwich beach the most beautiful in Britain.
- 7 February – A letter bomb is sent to the main Driver and Vehicle Licensing Agency centre in Swansea, south Wales. Four workers are taken to Morriston Hospital in Swansea, including a woman with cuts to her hands and body.
- 9 February – Unpredicted snow storms wreak havoc across the country. 602 schools and many more business forced to close. Traffic is heavily disrupted. Parts of the M4 motorway temporary close and 500 people are trapped in cars on the A48 between Carmarthen and Cross Hands.
- 12 February – A report by the National Trust reveals that more than 70% of the coastline in Wales, including 143 miles of coastline, is under threat from coastal erosion and flooding.
- 22 February – It is confirmed that Prince Harry, the son of the Prince of Wales, will be serving with his regiment in Iraq.
- February – A lightning strike severely damages Llandaff Cathedral organ.
- March – Llwynywermod estate in the Brecon Beacons is purchased by the Duchy of Cornwall to provide a Welsh residence for the Prince of Wales (now Charles III).
- 1 April – Prescription charges are abolished for NHS patients in Wales.
- 2 April – Smoking ban comes into force in all enclosed public places.
- 4 May – In the elections for the National Assembly for Wales, Labour suffer a net loss of three seats, Plaid Cymru make a net gain of three seats, and all other parties retain the same number of seats as before the election. Labour no longer have an overall majority. Alun Pugh becomes the only Assembly minister to lose his seat, defeated by Conservative Darren Millar. Labour defector John Marek loses his seat to his former constituency secretary, Lesley Griffiths. Plaid Cymru's Mohammad Asghar becomes the first Assembly member from an ethnic minority.
- 8 May – First public flight on the publicly subsidised air service between the new Anglesey Airport and Cardiff International Airport.
- 16 May – It is announced that Prince Harry will not, after all, be serving with his regiment in Iraq.
- 26 May – It is announced that the Military Cross awarded to Siegfried Sassoon will go on display at the Royal Welch Fusiliers museum in Caernarfon.
- 4 June – Claire Jones is appointed official harpist to the Prince of Wales
- 17 June – Paul Potts, from Port Talbot, wins the national final of the first series of Britain's Got Talent.
- 27 June – One Wales agreement between Welsh Labour Party and Plaid Cymru.
- July - The International Eisteddfod at Llangollen is the best-attended since the event began, with ticket sales up 11% on the previous year.
- 26 July – Efforts to save the life of Shambo, a black Friesian bull living at the Hindu Skanda Vale Temple near Llanpumsaint, finally fail and the bull is put down after testing positive for tuberculosis.
- 4–11 August - The National Eisteddfod of Wales is held at Mold, Flintshire.
- 14 September – Ioan Gruffudd marries Alice Evans.
- 17 September – Five people are killed in a two-car collision on the M4 motorway at Newport.
- 30 September – Unveiling of the first Welsh national memorial to the Falklands War takes place in Cardiff.
- 16 October – Houses are evacuated when part of the Monmouthshire & Brecon Canal's bank collapses at Gilwern.

== Arts and culture ==
=== Awards ===
- National Eisteddfod of Wales: Chair – T. James Jones
- National Eisteddfod of Wales: Crown – Tudur Dylan Jones
- National Eisteddfod of Wales: Prose Medal – Mary Payne
- National Eisteddfod of Wales: Drama Medal – Nic Ros
- Wales Book of the Year:
  - English language: Lloyd Jones, Mr Cassini
  - Welsh language: Llwyd Owen, Ffydd Gobaith Cariad
- Dylan Thomas Award:
- BBC Cardiff Singer of the World competition:
  - Main Prize – Shenyang
  - Song Prize – Elizabeth Watts
- Glyndŵr Award – Shani Rhys James
- Cân i Gymru: Einir Dafydd and Ceri Wyn Jones – "Blwyddyn Mas"

=== New books ===
==== Welsh language ====
- Tony Bianchi – Pryfeta
- Mererid Hopwood – Ar Bwys
- Watcyn L Jones – Cofio Capel Celyn
- Gareth Miles – Y Proffwyd a’i Ddwy Jesebel
- Mary Annes Payne – Rhodd Mam

==== English language ====
- Phil Carradice – People’s Poetry of the Great War
- Grahame Davies – Real Wrexham
- Peter Ho Davies – The Welsh Girl
- Eirian Jones – The War of the Little Englishman: Enclosure Riots on a Lonely Welsh Hillside
- Owen Sheers – Resistance
- J. P. R. Williams – Given the Breaks: My Life in Rugby

=== Music ===
==== Albums ====
- The Gentle Good – Dawel Disgyn (EP)
- Aled Jones – Reason To Believe
- Karl Jenkins – This Land of Ours (with the Cory Band and Cantorion)
- Katherine Jenkins – Viva
- Kelly Jones – Only the Names Have Been Changed
- Natasha Marsh – Amour
- Paul Potts – One Chance
- Gruff Rhys – Candylion
- Lisa Scott-Lee – Never and Now
- Stereophonics – Pull the Pin
- Bryn Terfel – A Song in My Heart
- Elin Manahan Thomas – Eternal Light

== Film ==
- The Baker, starring Damian Lewis and directed by Gareth Lewis, is set and filmed in Wales.

== Broadcasting ==
- 3 January – Ian Watkins, better known as "H" from Steps, becomes an entrant in the fifth UK series of Celebrity Big Brother. On the same day, he announces he is gay.
- 18 January – S4C introduces a new corporate logo and brand.
- 14 July – Radio Tircoed begins broadcasting on a permanent basis as a community radio station.
- 8 October – BBC Radio Cymru relaunches its C2 youth and music output.
- 29 November - XFM South Wales launches.

=== Welsh-language television ===
- Codi Canu

=== English-language television ===
- Coal House (documentary series)
- Keith Allen stars as the Sheriff of Nottingham in a second series of Robin Hood.
- Coming Home
- Gavin & Stacey, starring Ruth Jones, Joanna Page and Rob Brydon
- Glyn's Virgin Voters, one-off documentary featuring Glyn Wise

== Sport ==
- 17 January – ISPAL (Institute for Sport, Parks and Leisure) is officially launched.
- 17 March – Wales defeat England in their final match of the 2007 Six Nations Championship, to finish fifth in the final table (beating Scotland only on overall points difference).
- 10 May – The James Bevan Trophy is launched, to commemorate the Australian-born Welsh-raised man who was the first ever captain of the Wales rugby team.
- 3 June – Wales reach the semi-finals of the World Sevens (rugby union) tournament at Murrayfield.
- 19 June – Darren Morgan wins the European Masters snooker championship.
- July – The Welsh Super Cup (football) is scheduled to be held at Aberystwyth.
- 3 August – Wales are defeated 62-5 by England in a warm-up match for the Rugby World Cup.
- 29 September – Wales lose to Fiji in their decisive Group B match, and thus fail to reach the quarter-finals of the Rugby World Cup.
- 29 September – Wales wins the gold medal at the European Mixed Curling Championships in Madrid, Spain. The Welsh team of Adrian Meikle (skip), Lesley Carol (third), Andrew Tanner (second), Blair Hughes (lead) and Chris Wells (alternate) took the Gold Medal in a thrilling Final against Denmark.
- BBC Wales Sports Personality of the Year – Joe Calzaghe

== Births ==
- 17 March – Ruby Evans, artistic gymnast
- 17 December – James, son of Prince Edward and Sophie (then Earl and Countess of Wessex). The child is given his father's subsidiary title of "Viscount Severn" as a courtesy title, in recognition of his mother's Welsh ancestry. (Prince Edward, Sophie and James have since become Duke and Duchess of Edinburgh, and Earl of Wessex {by courtesy}, respectively.)

== Deaths ==
- 4 January – Gren, cartoonist, 72
- 12 January – Berwyn Jones, athlete, 66
- 14 January – Peter Prendergast, painter, 60
- 21 January – Peter Clarke, Children's Commissioner for Wales, 58
- 24 January – David Morris, MEP and peace activist, 76
- 30 January – Griffith Jones, actor, 97
- 6 February – Sir Gareth Roberts, physicist, 66
- 7 February – Brian Williams, Welsh international rugby player, 44
- 10 February – Bill Clement, Welsh international rugby player and Secretary of the WRU, 91
- 21 February – John Robins, rugby player, 80
- 22 February – Edgar Evans, opera singer, 94
- 1 April – Ivor Wynne Jones, journalist, 80
- 3 April – Marion Eames, novelist, 85
- 12 April
  - Len Hill, sportsman, 65
  - Maldwyn Jones, historian, 84
- 13 April – Tony Goble, artist, 63
- 22 May – Ifor Owen, illustrator, 91
- 11 June – Mercer Simpson, writer, 81
- 12 June – Colin Fletcher, backpacker and writer, 85
- 12 August – Alwyn Rice Jones, former Archbishop of Wales and Bishop of St Asaph, 73
- 16 August
  - Will Edwards, politician, 69
  - Roland Mathias, poet, 91
- 6 September – Byron Stevenson, footballer, 50
- 9 September
  - Steve Jones, rugby player, 55
  - Sir Tasker Watkins, VC, 88
- 14 October – Carol Evans, cricketer, 68
- 31 October (in Málaga) - Ray Gravell, rugby player and radio presenter, 56
- 15 November – W. S. Jones, author, 87
- December
  - Ron Davies, footballer, 75
  - Richard Williams, conductor
- date unknown – Norman Harris, rugby player

== See also ==
- 2007 in Northern Ireland
