= Ivor Griffiths =

Welsh footballer

Personal information
- Date of birth: 19 June 1918
- Place of birth: Port Talbot, Wales
- Date of death: October 1993 (age 75)
- Position: Winger

Senior career*
Years	Team	Apps	(Gls)
?–1946	Tottenham Hotspur	0	(0)
1946–c 1947	Chester	1	(0)
c 1947–?	Oswestry Town		
- * Club domestic league appearances and goals

Ivor Griffiths (19 June 1918 – October 1993) was a Welsh footballer.

Griffiths made one appearance in The Football League for Chester in December 1946 in a 1–2 defeat at Rochdale. He had previously been with Tottenham Hotspur and he later joined Oswestry Town.
