= Ted Morris (footballer) =

Welsh footballer

Personal information
- Full name: Edwin Morris
- Date of birth: 6 May 1921
- Place of birth: Pontypool, Wales
- Date of death: March 2000 (aged 78)
- Place of death: Cardiff, Wales
- Position: Goalkeeper

Senior career*
Years	Team	Apps	(Gls)
1948–1951	Cardiff City	8	(0)
1951–1956	Barry Town	139	(0)
- * Club domestic league appearances and goals

Edwin Morris (6 May 1921 - March 2000) was a Welsh professional footballer who played as a goalkeeper. He played eight times in the Football League for Cardiff City.

== Career ==
Having played amateur football for Bewdley Town after World War II, Morris was signed by Cardiff City in 1948. He spent three seasons with the club, making eight league appearances, as understudy to first choice goalkeeper Phil Joslin. He was released in 1951 and went on to play for Barry Town, making over 100 appearances for the club.
