= Alwyn Davies =

British chemist (1926–2023)

Alwyn G Davies
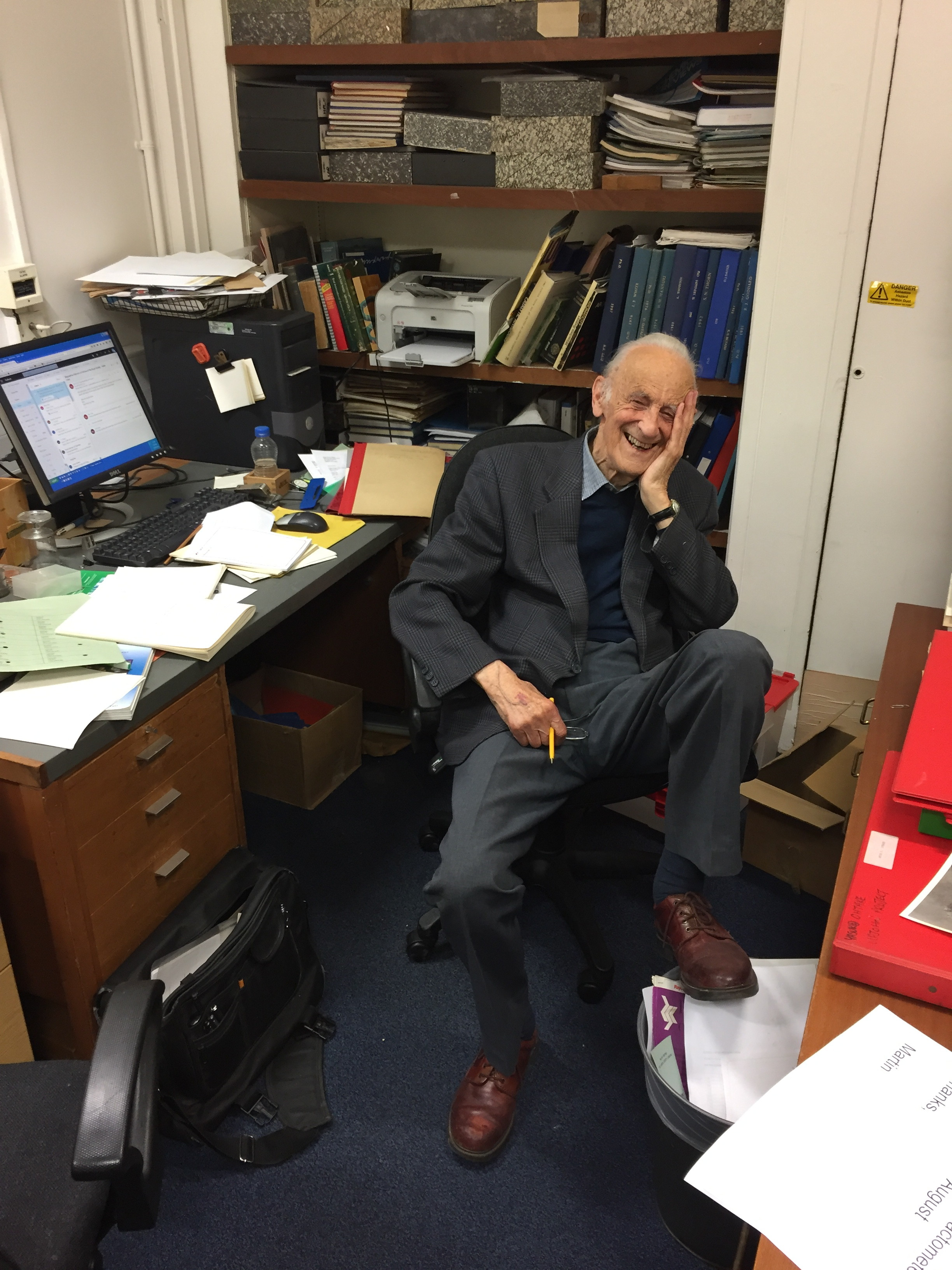
- A portrait of AG Davies taken in his office in 2019.
- Born: 13 May 1926
- Died: 1 September 2023 (aged 97)
- Occupations: Chemist, historian of chemistry
- Children: 2
- Awards: RSC Ingold Lecturer 1992-3, RSC Medal for Organic Reaction Mechanism, 1989; Humboldt Prize, Freiburg University, 1994.
- Scientific career
- Institutions: University College London
- Doctoral advisor: Christopher Ingold

Alwyn George Davies FRS (13 May 1926 – 1 September 2023) was a British chemist, emeritus professor, and Fellow of University College London.

== Life and career ==
Alwyn George Davies was born on 13 May 1926. Alwyn came to UCL as an undergraduate in 1944. He was awarded a B.Sc. from University College London in 1946, and Ph.D. in 1949, where he studied with Christopher Kelk Ingold.

Davies was a lecturer at Battersea Polytechnic, from 1949 to 1953. He also taught at University College London from 1953 to 1991, with promotion to Reader in 1964 and Professor in 1968. His research focused on organic peroxides, radicals and organotin chemistry. His students were sometimes referred to as "Alwyn's Tin Men".

Davies was interim Head of Department from 1971 to 1974, after Ronald Sidney Nyholm's death in 1970. He was elected FRS in 1989. Giving regular talks about William Ramsay to visitors and undergraduates, he was UCL Chemistry's unofficial historian and archivist.

Alwyn Davies died on 1 September 2023, at the age of 97.
