= 2007–08 in Welsh football =

== National team ==
2007-08 saw Wales continue their quest for qualification to Euro 2008 in Austria and Switzerland. They played the Republic of Ireland, San Marino, Cyprus, Germany, Czech Republic and Slovakia. They did not qualify for the finals tournament.

== FAW Premier Cup ==
In March 2008, Newport County won the FAW Premier Cup beating Llanelli 1–0 in the final.

== Welsh Cup ==
Bangor City won the 2008 Welsh Cup beating Llanelli in the final 4-2 after extra time.

== Welsh League Cup ==
Llanelli won the 2008 Welsh League Cup beating Rhyl 2–0 in the final.

== Welsh Premier League ==
2007-08 was the first since 2005 that the top division had 18 teams as a result of Neath Athletic's promotion from the Welsh Football League. This meant that all teams were in action on every matchday whereas for the previous 2 seasons there were 17 teams with one team inactive every weekend.

- Champions: Llanelli
- Relegated to Cymru Alliance : Llangefni Town

== Welsh Football League Division One ==
Cwmbran Town's relegation from the Welsh Premier League in the 2006–07 season saw them play in the First Division for 2007–08.

Barry Town, historically the most successful team in the League of Wales, suffered further relegation from the First Division to Second Division. This followed their relegation from the Welsh Premier League in 2004.

- Champions: Goytre United - did not apply for promotion to Welsh Premier League

== Cymru Alliance League ==
- Champions: Prestatyn Town - promoted to Welsh Premier League
