= John Evan Davies =

John Evan Davies (1850–1929) was a Welsh Calvinistic Methodist minister. As a boy he attended Llandeilo Grammar School in Wales. He later studied at Trefeca Calvinistic Methodist College and in Glasgow, graduating in 1880. He held an initial appointment in Llanelli, and further appointments in Jewin, London (1886–1911), and Llandeilo and Llanelli. He died in Gowerton in 1929.

His written works include a number of articles for Y Geninen, a memorial volume to James Hughes (1779–1844) published in 1911 and a volume of poems, Blodau'r Grug, published in 1921.
