= William Vincent (civil servant) =

Welsh civil servant & diplomat (1866-1941)

Sir William Vincent GCIE KCSI
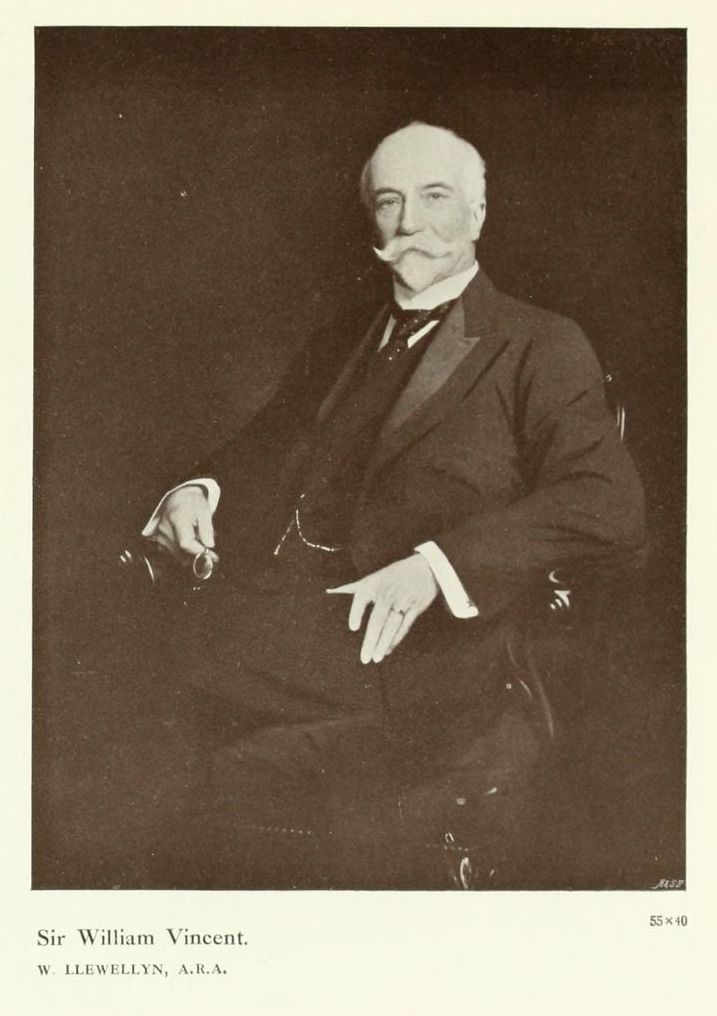
- Portrait c. 1914
- Born: 1 April 1866
- Died: 17 April 1941 (aged 75)

Sir William Henry Hoare Vincent GCIE KCSI (1 April 1866 – 17 April 1941) was a Welsh civil servant and diplomat in India.

The youngest son of James Crawley Vincent and grandson of the dean of Bangor, he was educated at Christ College, Brecon and Trinity College, Dublin. In 1887 he joined the Indian Civil Service, rising to vice-president of the legislative council of India and a member of the Council of India from 1923 to 1931.

Knighted in 1913, Vincent was India's representative at the League of Nations in 1926. He returned to Wales in 1931 and became treasurer of the University College of North Wales, Bangor. He was the brother of Sir Hugh Corbet Vincent.

Vincent was knighted in 1913, created a KCSI in 1918 and a GCIE (Grand Commander of the Order of the Indian Empire) in 1922.
