= 2017 in Wales =

- Centuries: 19th; 20th; 21st
- Decades: 1990s; 2000s; 2010s; 2020s
- See also: List of years in Wales; Timeline of Welsh history 2017 in The United Kingdom England Scotland Elsewhere

This article is about the particular significance of the year 2017 to Wales and its people.

== Incumbents ==
- First Minister – Carwyn Jones
- Secretary of State for Wales – Alun Cairns
- Archbishop of Wales – Barry Morgan, Bishop of Llandaff; John Davies, Bishop of Swansea and Brecon, from 6 September
- Archdruid of the National Eisteddfod of Wales – Geraint Llifon
- National Poet of Wales – Ifor ap Glyn

== Events ==
=== January ===
- 1 January – Wales football manager Chris Coleman is revealed as the Nos Galan runner at the traditional New Year event in the Cynon Valley.
- 27 January – A farewell service is held at Llandaff Cathedral for retiring Archbishop of Wales Barry Morgan.

=== February ===
- February – It is announced that Coleg Harlech will close as an adult education site at the end of the academic year.
- 9 February – Christina Rees returns to the Labour front bench as Shadow Secretary of State for Wales.
- 22 February – The British government confirms that in future MPs will be able to use the Welsh language during meetings of the Welsh Grand Committee.
- 28 February – HM Prison Berwyn opens in Wrexham County Borough; it will become the largest in the UK.

=== March ===
- 13 March – A petition by the parents of April Jones, calling for sex offenders to remain on the register for life, is debated in Parliament.
- 30 March – Olympic cyclist Ciara Horne is injured in a traffic accident in Pontyclun, when a car collides with her bicycle.

=== April ===
- 1 April – Sir Tom Jones is criticised for swearing audibly on live television during the final of The Voice UK.
- 6 April – Mark Reckless AM quits UKIP and will now support the Conservative Party group in the National Assembly for Wales.
- 21 April – Labour leader Jeremy Corbyn launches his general election campaign with a rally in Cardiff.
- 27 April – June Osborne is named as the new Bishop of Llandaff.
- 30 April – Ten men are arrested after a man dies following a violent altercation in Rhyl.

=== May ===
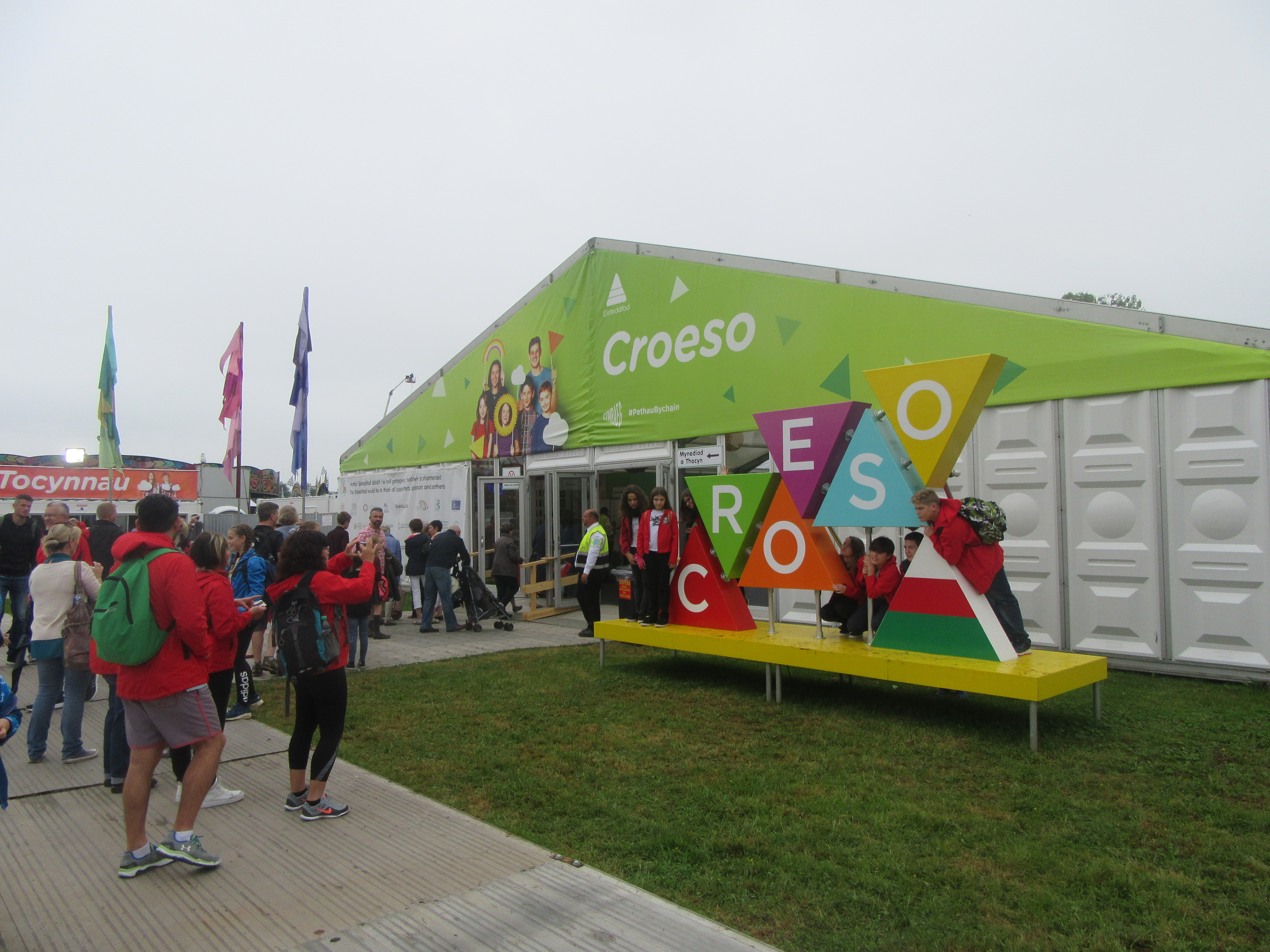
The Urdd National Eisteddod commences on 29 May at Pencoed in Bridgend

- 4 May – Local elections in Wales, taking place concurrently with Scotland and parts of England. Labour lost control of Blaenau Gwent and Bridgend councils, while the Conservatives gained a majority in Monmouthshire.
- 13 May – Welsh singer Lucie Jones represents the UK in the final of the Eurovision Song Contest 2017, finishing in 15th place.
- 18 May
  - Tributes are paid to Wales's former First Minister Rhodri Morgan by politicians from all parties, including Jeremy Corbyn, Leanne Wood and Lord German.
  - The Welsh Assembly's Culture, Welsh Language and Communications Committee concludes that plans to double the number of Welsh speakers to one million by 2050 carry a "risk that this may have a distortive effect on the delivery of educational priorities as the system is realigned to be able to deliver the language strategy".
- 22 May – Welsh Labour launches its manifesto with a promise to support the construction of a new nuclear power station, Wylfa Newydd.
- 27 May – The 30th Hay Festival commences. Guest speakers at this year's event include Bernie Sanders, Stephen Fry, Garry Kasparov, Tracey Emin, Charlotte Rampling and Neil Gaiman.
- 29 May – The first day of the Urdd National Eisteddfod begins in Pencoed, Bridgend, with hopes of attracting around 100,000 visitors.

=== June ===
- 14 June
  - In an accident at an army firing range in Castlemartin, Pembrokeshire, two members of the Royal Tank Regiment are killed by an explosion in a Challenger 2 tank.
  - A reshuffle of Jeremy Corbyn's shadow cabinet results in former leadership rival Owen Smith, MP for Pontypridd, taking responsibility for Northern Ireland.
- 16 June – Welsh people honoured in the Queen's Birthday Honours list include Malcolm Walker, co-founder of the Iceland chain (knighthood) and senior nurse Professor Jean Christine White (CBE).
- 19 June – Darren Osborne, a 47-year-old Cardiff resident, is arrested after driving a van hired from Pontyclun into a group of Muslim men in Finsbury Park, London, injuring at least ten people.
- 20 June – Richard Evans, son of the proprietor of Pontyclun Van Hire, is arrested after making offensive remarks on Facebook about the Finsbury Park incident.

=== July ===
- 13 July – Stephen Hough is convicted of the killing of Flintshire schoolgirl Janet Commins, 41 years after her death. Noel Jones, an illiterate gypsy boy, had admitted killing Commins and had served half of a 12-year prison sentence, but told the court he had been made a scapegoat by police.
- 15 July – June Osborne is enthroned as Bishop of Llandaff, the first woman to hold the position.
- 22 July – Michelle Brown, UKIP Assembly member for north Wales, admits and apologises for using a racial slur in a telephone conversation, after her former assistant Nigel Williams released a recording of the call.

=== August ===
- 7 August – Wet weather affects the start of the 2017 National Eisteddfod of Wales at Bodedern on Anglesey. A Park-and-Ride system is used to ferry visitors to the Maes.

=== September ===
- 6 September – John Davies, Bishop of Swansea and Brecon, is elected Archbishop of Wales.
- 26 September – Cardiff's Sherman Theatre is criticised for appointing a non-Welsh speaker as its new associate director. Manon Eames of the Writers' Guild of Great Britain and actor Ifan Huw Dafydd both claim that the Arts Council of Wales is spending too much of its budget outside the principality.
- 30 September – Ospreys rugby player Scott Baldwin has to miss a game after being bitten on the hand by a captive lion at Weltevrede Game Lodge near Bloemfontein, South Africa.

=== October ===
- 2 October – Secretary of State for Wales Alun Cairns attacks First Minister Carwyn Jones in a speech, accusing him of being "obsessed with power".

=== November ===
- 3 November – Welsh Assembly minister Carl Sargeant is suspended by the Labour Party pending an investigation into allegations of sexual misconduct.
- 16 November – Michael Sheen gives the annual Raymond Williams Memorial Lecture at Merthyr Tydfil. Much later, Sheen will reveal that he returned his OBE before giving the lecture, in order to avoid being hypocritical.
- 17 November – Chris Coleman announces his resignation as manager of the Wales national football team.

== Arts and culture ==
=== Welsh Awards ===
- Glyndŵr Award
- National Eisteddfod of Wales: Chair – Osian Rhys Jones
- National Eisteddfod of Wales: Crown – Gwion Hallam
- National Eisteddfod of Wales: Prose Medal – Sonia Edwards
- National Eisteddfod of Wales: Drama Medal – Heiddwen Tomos
- Gwobr Goffa Daniel Owen: withheld
- Wales Book of the Year
  - English language: Alys Conran, Pigeon
  - Welsh language: Idris Reynolds, Cofio Dic

=== New books ===
==== English language ====
- Tony Curtis – Some Kind of Immortality
- Joe England – Merthyr, The Crucible of Modern Wales
- Ken Follett – Edge of Eternity (2014)
- Mike Jenkins – Sofa Surfin
- Cynan Jones – Cove
- Johnny Tudor – My Heart is Bleeding – The Life of Dorothy Squires

==== Welsh language ====
- Haf Llewelyn – I Wyneb y Ddrycin – Hedd Wyn, Yr Ysgwrn a'r Rhyfel Mawr
- Peredur Lynch – Caeth a Rhydd
- Mihangel Morgan – 60
- Iestyn Tyne – Addunedau

=== Music ===
- Paul Mealor – Euphonium Concerto, commissioned by the Welsh Proms and premièred by David Childs (euphonium) and the Royal Philharmonic Orchestra conducted by Owain Arwel Hughes at St David's Hall, Cardiff, on 29 July.
- Huw Watkins – Symphony, premièred by the Hallé Orchestra at the Bridgewater Hall, Manchester, on 20 April.

=== Film ===
- Don't Take Me Home (documentary), directed by Jonny Owen

== Sport ==
=== Awards ===
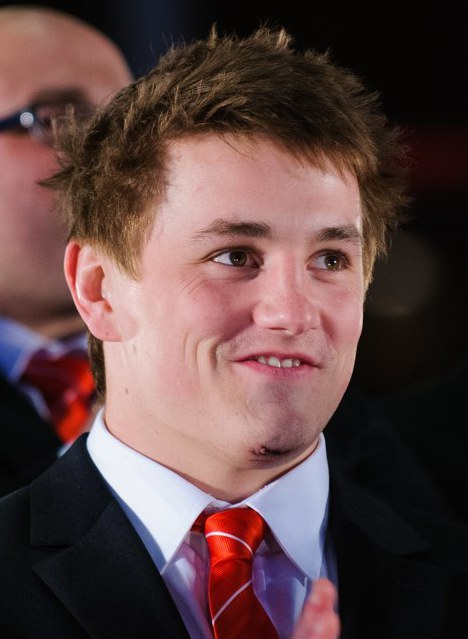
Jonathan Davies

- BBC Cymru Wales Sports Personality of the Year – Jonathan Davies

=== In sports ===
- Horse Racing
  - 27 December – the 2017 Welsh Grand National is abandoned due to waterlogging and postponed to 6 January 2018.
- Road cycling
  - 21 April – Geraint Thomas wins the 2017 Tour of the Alps, becoming the first British cyclist to win the race.
- Rugby Union
  - 18 March – Wales finish fifth in the 2017 Six Nations Championship, having lost three of their five matches.
  - 19 April – Sam Warburton is named as captain of the 2017 British & Irish Lions tour to New Zealand, becoming only the second player to captain the Lions on two tours.
- Track cycling
  - 16 April – Elinor Barker wins the World Championship in the Women's points race.

== Broadcasting ==
=== English-language television ===
- Beti and David: Lost for Words
- Hedd Wyn: the Lost War Poet

=== English-language radio ===
- The Black Chair presented by Mab Jones

=== Welsh-language television ===
- Byw Celwydd, series 2
- Un Bore Mercher

== Deaths ==
- 13 January – Antony Armstrong-Jones, 1st Earl of Snowdon, 86, Welsh-descended photographer and member of the British Royal Family
- 21 January – Shirley Paget, Marchioness of Anglesey, 92, writer
- 31 January – Deke Leonard, 72, rock musician (death announced on this date)
- 21 February – Garel Rhys, 77, academic
- 25 February
  - Lloyd Williams, 83, Wales national rugby union team captain.
  - Elli Norkett, 20, Welsh rugby union international.
- 1 March – Dai Morgan Evans, 73, English-born archaeologist (cancer)
- 3 March – Gordon Thomas, 84, Welsh investigative journalist and author
- 22 March – John Derrick, 54, Glamorgan cricketer (brain tumour)
- 28 March – Gwilym Prys Davies, Baron Prys-Davies, 93, lawyer and politician
- 10 April – David Parry-Jones, 83, broadcaster and author
- 16 April – Michael Bogdanov, 78, theatre director
- 23 April – Michael Williams, Baron Williams of Baglan, 67, peer and diplomat
- 12 May – David Thomas, 74, Provincial Assistant Bishop of the Church in Wales
- 17 May – Rhodri Morgan, politician, First Minister of Wales (2000–2009), 77
- 20 May – Noel Kinsey, footballer, 91
- 22 May – Philippa Roles, discus thrower, 39
- 31 May – Lyn James, Welsh-born Australian actress (The Young Doctors), 87 (death announced on this date)
- 21 June – John Faull, 83, Wales and British & Irish Lions rugby union international
- 23 June – John Freeman, 83, rugby player (Halifax R.L.F.C. and Wales)
- 2 July – Tony Bianchi, 65, author
- 25 July – Hywel Bennett, 73, actor
- 4 August – David James Bowen, 91, academic (death announced on this date)
- 18 August – Duncan Bush, 71, poet and author
- 18–19 August – Don Shepherd, 90, cricketer
- 25 September – Aneurin Jones, 87, painter
- 7 November – Carl Sargeant, 49, politician (suicide)
- 12 November – Jamie MacDonald, 26, judoka (brain tumour)
- 21 November – Iola Gregory, 71, actress
- 26 November – Timothy Stamps, 81, Welsh-born Zimbabwean politician
- 5 December – Meic Povey, 67, actor and playwright

== See also ==
- 2017 in Northern Ireland
