= Hilda Vaughan =

Welsh novelist (1892–1985)

Hilda Campbell Vaughan (married name Morgan, 12 June 1892 – 4 November 1985) was a Welsh novelist and short story writer writing in English. Her ten varied novels, set mostly in her native Radnorshire, concern rural communities and heroines. Her first novel was The Battle to the Weak (1925), her last The Candle and the Light (1954). She was married to the writer Charles Langbridge Morgan, who had an influence on her writings. Although favourably received by her contemporaries, Vaughan's works later received minimal attention. Rediscovery began in the 1980s and 1990s, along with a renewed interest in Welsh literature in English as a whole.

== Life ==
=== Early years ===
Vaughan was born in Builth Wells, Powys, then the county of Brecknockshire, into a prosperous family, as the youngest daughter of Hugh Vaughan Vaughan and Eva (née Campbell). Her father was a successful country solicitor and held various public offices in the neighbouring county of Radnorshire. She was a descendant of the 17th-century poet Henry Vaughan.

Vaughan was educated privately, and remained at home until the outbreak of the First World War in 1914, after which she served in a Red Cross hospital and for the Women's Land Army in Brecknockshire and Radnorshire. Her work brought her into contact with women living on the local farms, and would become an influence on her writing. At the end of the war she left home for London. While she was attending a writing course at Bedford College, she met the novelist Charles Langbridge Morgan. They were married on 6 June 1923 and then spent nine years in a flat in Chelsea. In December 1924, Vaughan gave birth to the couple's first child, Elizabeth Shirley.

=== First major writings ===
On her husband's advice, Vaughan decided not to publish The Invader as her first novel. Instead she opted for The Battle to the Weak (1925), whose manuscript Morgan had extensively edited. Both being writers, the couple would guide and advise each other on literary matters. Christopher Newman notes that although her literary technique would develop throughout her career, this novel contains "virtually all the themes developed in her later works", especially those of duty and self-sacrifice. It was favourably received, with reviews noting its accomplishment, despite it being her first.

In 1926, Vaughan gave birth to the couple's second child, Roger, who became a librarian at the House of Lords Library. The success of her first novel was repeated in that year with the publication of the novel Here Are Lovers. When The Invader was finally published in 1928, it was also favourably received, being seen by Country Life as "one of the best novels of the year". Her next two novels, Her Father's House (1930) and The Soldier and the Gentlewoman (1932) were likewise critically acclaimed. The latter, probably her most successful novel, was dramatised and shown at the Vaudeville Theatre, London, in the same year.

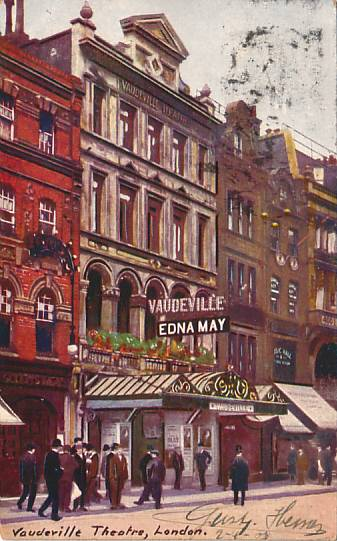
The Vaudeville Theatre, London, c. 1905, where a drama based on Vaughan's novel The Soldier and the Gentlewoman (1932) was performed

=== Later writings ===
Vaughan's later novels – The Curtain Rises (1935), Harvest Home (1936), The Fair Woman (1942), Pardon and Peace (1945) and The Candle and the Light (1954) – were also received well, but with less fervour. With the outbreak of the Second World War, Vaughan and her children went to the United States, where they stayed from 1939 to 1943. The Fair Woman was published whilst there, and later republished in England as Iron and Gold (1948). An exception to the more muted success was the novella A Thing of Nought (1934; revised edition 1948), which returns to some of the same themes as The Battle to the Weak. As well as being critically acclaimed, it unexpectedly sold out within four days of publication. During this period, Vaughan also wrote two plays with Laurier Lister: She Too was Young (1938), performed at Wyndham's Theatre, London, and Forsaking All Other, which was never performed.

=== Final years ===
The 1950s and 1960s were a time of disappointment, in which Vaughan sought fruitlessly to have earlier work re-issued. In 1957 she visited the West Indies with Charles, as it was thought the climate might benefit his ailing health. However, the visit proved ineffectual and he died the following year. Her own health being also affected, Vaughan published no more novels and only minimal writings for the rest of her life. Her final piece was an introduction to Thomas Traherne's Centuries, published in 1960, in which she offers an account of her religious faith in terms that are described as "quasi-mystical". In 1963 she was elected a fellow of the Royal Society of Literature.

Hilda Vaughan died on 4 November 1985 at a nursing home in Putney, London, and was buried at Dyserth, Radnorshire. She and her husband were survived by their daughter and son. The former married Henry Paget, 7th Marquess of Anglesey, in 1948, thereby becoming a marchioness. Their son, Roger Morgan, was librarian of the House of Lords.

== Legacy ==
Vaughan's work was favourably received by her contemporaries and reviewed by publications across the world. During her lifetime, her reputation was overshadowed by that of her husband, especially after the publication in 1932 of his novel The Fountain. However, her reputation declined towards the end of her life, with little or no critical attention. As an example of her status, Vaughan's entry for the Encyclopedia of British Women's Writing 1900–1950 has her as one of the "'recovered' writers", whose entries are briefer than the "better known writers".

Gustav Felix Adam's Three Contemporary Anglo-Welsh Novelists: Jack Jones, Rhys Davies and Hilda Vaughan (1950) was the last critical analysis of her work for some time and not entirely complimentary. In Glyn Jones's The Dragon Has Two Tongues (1968), considered a seminal analysis of the tradition of Welsh literature in English, Vaughan gains only one mention, as one of those who "write about the squirearchy and its anglicized capers." A major contribution to her legacy was Christopher Newman's biography of her published in 1981. He remarks, "Her claims to be remembered... are two: first [that] she extended the English regional novel to the "Southern Marches", the land [known as] rhwng Gwy a Hafren; secondly, that in doing so, she made a significant addition to Anglo-Welsh writing." In the 1980s and 1990s, Vaughan's work became reincorporated into a renewed analysis of Anglo-Welsh writers and writing.

== Works ==
=== Novels ===
- The Battle to the Weak (1925) Republished by Parthian, 2010
- Here are Lovers (1926) Republished by Honno Classics, 2012
- The Invader, subtitled: a tale of adventure and passion (1928)
- Her Father's House (1930)
- The Soldier and the Gentlewoman (1932; republished by Honno Classics, 2014)
- The Curtain Rises (1935)
- Harvest Home (1936)
- The Fair Woman (1942), later republished in England under the title Iron and Gold (1948)
- Pardon and Peace (1943)
- Iron and Gold (1948) (see The Fair Woman above; republished by Honno Classics, 2002]
- The Candle and the Light (1954)
- Recovered Greenness (unpublished, incomplete)

=== Plays ===
- She Too Was Young (1938, with Laurier Lister)
- Forsaking All Other (with Laurier Lister; never performed)

=== Stories ===
- A Thing of Nought (1934)
- Alive or Dead (1944)

=== Miscellaneous ===
- "A country childhood", Lovat Dickson's Magazine, October 1934
- "Far away: not long ago", Lovat Dickson's Magazine, January 1935
- "Introduction' to Thomas Traherne's Centuries". Faith Press, London. 1960. (pp. xi–xxi).
