= E. Tegla Davies =

Welsh writer (1880–1967)

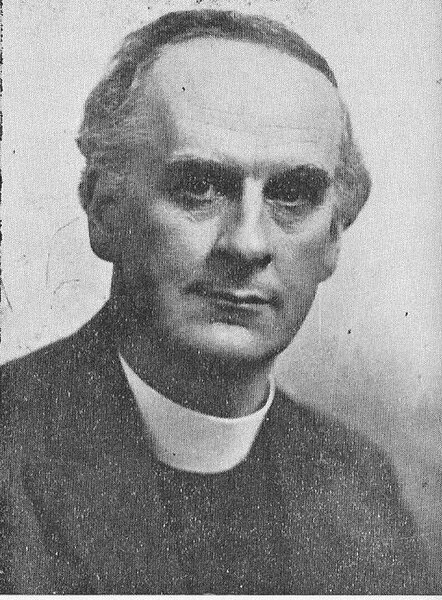
1928 portrait of Edward Tegla Davies

Edward Tegla Davies (1880–1967) was a Welsh Wesleyan Methodist minister and a popular Welsh language writer, born at Llandegla-yn-Iâl, Denbighshire, north Wales.

His works include a number of children's books which display his rich imagination and sometimes surreal humour, the novel Gŵr Pen y Bryn (1923), short stories and a series of essays. Among the latter is the collection Gyda'r Hwyr (1957), including Y Bedd Hwnnw ("That Grave") recording a visit to the grave of the Blessed John Henry Newman at Rubery (Longbridge) near Birmingham, and Y Wraig o'r Wyddgrug ("The Woman from Mold"), in which he meets, in Manchester, someone who knew the Welsh novelist, Daniel Owen, in her youth.

A Cabinet Office release in 2012 shows that he declined an OBE in the New Year Honours in 1963.
