= 2009 in Wales =

- Centuries: 19th; 20th; 21st
- Decades: 1980s; 1990s; 2000s; 2010s; 2020s
- See also: List of years in Wales; Timeline of Welsh history 2009 in The United Kingdom England Scotland Elsewhere Welsh football: 2008–09 • 2009–10

This article is about the particular significance of the year 2009 to Wales and its people.

== Incumbents ==
- First Minister
  - Rhodri Morgan (until 9 December)
  - Carwyn Jones
- Secretary of State for Wales
  - Paul Murphy (until 5 June)
  - Peter Hain
- Archbishop of Wales – Barry Morgan, Bishop of Llandaff
- Archdruid of the National Eisteddfod of Wales
  - Dic Jones (outgoing)
  - Jim Parc Nest (incoming)

== Events ==
- 1 January
  - The Archbishop of Canterbury, Dr Rowan Williams, broadcasts a New Year message on BBC television. He warns against losing sight of our "real treasure" and says: "Our hearts will be in a very bad way if they're focused only on the state of our finances."
  - Record numbers of swimmers participate in New Year's Day charity swims at Amroth, Saundersfoot and Abersoch.
- 2 January - Dame Tanni Grey-Thompson denies having criticised the failure to include all UK Paralympic gold medal-winners in the UK New Year Honours List.
- 9 January - The UK Prime Minister, Gordon Brown, visits south Wales as part of a 3-day tour of the regions.
- 11 January - Eight rescuers are injured as four mountain rescue teams help bring two climbers to safety from the summit of Snowdon.
- 15 January - Welsh Conservative Assembly Members issue an announcement saying that they give their unanimous support to Nick Bourne as leader of the Assembly group.
- 19 January - The Cardiff International Sports Stadium opens, replacing the old Cardiff Athletics Stadium
- 22 January - After having been the only police force in the UK to record an increase in crime during 2007-2008, South Wales Police witnesses a 4% drop in crime in its area, according to the latest British Crime Survey.
- 26 January - Corus announces the loss of up to 1,100 jobs at its plants in Wales and the mothballing of the Llanwern hot strip mill.
- 2 February - After a 24-hour search, the Llanberis mountain rescue team recovers the bodies of two brothers from south-west England who went missing on Snowdon on 31 January.
- 8 February - At the 51st Grammy Awards in Los Angeles, Best Pop Vocal Album goes to Duffy for Rockferry.
- 11 February - Four people are killed in a mid-air collision between two light aircraft near Kenfig. They are two female air cadets from Rhondda, aged 13 and 14, and two RAF instructors.
- 18 February
  - Duffy wins the Best Female and British Breakthrough Act awards at the 2009 BRIT Awards; her album Rockferry wins Best Album.
  - The inquest opens into the Kenfig air crash of 11 February.
- 21 February - Rescuers have to abseil 500 feet (150 m) down a sheer rock face in the dark to rescue a team of three climbers stuck on Snowdon.
- 6 March - Boxer Joe Calzaghe wins a court action against his former manager Frank Warren, claiming £2 million in unpaid fees.
- 13 March - The Hoover Company ceases washing machine production at Merthyr Tydfil.
- 1 June - ftrmetro Swansea bus rapid transit system begins operation.
- 12 June - Hafod Eryri at the summit of Snowdon is opened.
- 27 June - An 11-mile stretch of the Llangollen Canal, including the Pontcysyllte Aqueduct, is designated a UNESCO World Heritage Site.
- 21 July - The first race meeting is held at Ffos Las racecourse, the first new National Hunt racecourse to be built in the United Kingdom for 80 years.
- 22 July - Official opening of the new Cardiff City Stadium, Wales' 2nd largest stadium, when Cardiff City F.C. drew against Glasgow's Celtic F.C.
- 31 July - Indesit ceases washing machine production at Kinmel Park, Bodelwyddan.
- 1 August - The National Eisteddfod of Wales opens at Bala.
- 8 August - The first test of the Ashes 2009 series, seeing England against Australia in Cricket, begins at Cardiff's SWALEC Stadium.
- 12 August - Wales begins the process of digital switchover with the turning off of parts of the analogue signal from the Kilvey Hill transmitter.
- 29 September - On his 70th birthday, Rhodri Morgan announces that he will stand down as First Minister in December.
- 22 October - The St David's Centre in Cardiff re-opens as one of the largest shopping centres in the United Kingdom after its multimillion-pound extension and the reconstruction of the surrounding area.
- November - Mererid Hopwood, the first woman to be nominated for the position of Archdruid of the National Eisteddfod, withdraws her name from consideration, leaving T. James Jones as the only candidate.
- 12 November - Health & Social Services Minister Edwina Hart declines a request by Liberal Democrat Kirsty Williams to review how £1 billion has been spent on NHS services in Wales.
- 13 November - The agreement A New Understanding is signed by representatives of the Welsh Assembly Government and the Welsh Local Government Association.
- 18 November - A report by the All Wales Convention finds that public opinion is narrowly in favour of increasing the powers of the Welsh Assembly.
- 21 November
  - Dannie Abse receives the Wilfred Owen Poetry Award.
  - Pride In Barry announces the planned placement of a Blue Plaque on 19 Porth Y Castell, Barry, in memory of boxer Jack Petersen.
- 9 December - Carwyn Jones takes office as First Minister for Wales.
- 16 December - The Afan Lido leisure complex in Port Talbot is badly damaged by fire.
- 29 December - A crater approximately 10 feet (3.0 m) wide and 12 feet (3.7 m) deep appears in Brynmair Close, Aberaman, Rhondda Cynon Taf. Nearby residents are evacuated as the cause is investigated.

== Arts and culture ==
=== Awards ===
- Glyndŵr Award – Llŷr Williams
- National Eisteddfod of Wales: Chair – withheld
- National Eisteddfod of Wales: Crown – Ceri Wyn Jones
- National Eisteddfod of Wales: Drama Medal – Dyfed Edwards
- National Eisteddfod of Wales: Fine Art Medal – Elfyn Lewis
- National Eisteddfod of Wales: Prose Medal – Siân Melangell Dafydd
- Gwobr Goffa Daniel Owen – Fflur Dafydd
- Wales Book of the Year:
  - English language: Deborah Kay Davies – Grace, Tamar and Laszlo the Beautiful
  - Welsh language: William Owen Roberts – Petrograd
- Kyffin Art Prize: Louisa Theunissen
- Cân i Gymru: Elfed Morgan Morris – "Gofidiau"
- BBC Cardiff Singer of the World competition:
  - Main Prize – Ekaterina Scherbachenko
  - Song Prize – Jan Martinik

=== New books ===
==== Welsh language ====
- Robat Gruffudd - A Gymri Di Gymru?
- Lloyd Jones - Y Dŵr

==== English language ====
- Emyr Humphreys - The Woman at the Window
- Siân James - Return to Hendre Ddu
- Nigel Owens - Half Time
- Malcolm Pryce - From Aberystwyth with Love
- John Powell Ward - The Last Green Year

=== Music ===
==== Classical ====
- Catrin Finch - Goldberg Variations (transcribed for harp)
- Rhydian - O Fortuna

==== Albums ====
- Derwyddon Dr Gonzo - Stonk!
- Only Men Aloud! - Band of Brothers
- Super Furry Animals - Dark Days/Light Years

==== Singles ====
- Vanessa Jenkins and Bryn West - "Barry Islands in the Stream" featuring Sir Tom Jones and Robin Gibb

== Theatre ==
- May - National Theatre Wales, an English-language theatre company, is established with a grant of £3 million.

== Film ==
- Underworld: Rise of the Lycans, starring Michael Sheen

== Broadcasting ==
=== Welsh-language TV ===
- Caerdydd
- S4C launches a new bilingual rugby website

=== English-language TV ===
- Coal House
- Doctor Who - David Tennant films his final scenes as The Doctor in Cardiff.
- Gavin & Stacey - series 3

== Sport ==
- January - Simon Lawson of Cardiff wins the 28th annual Richard Burton 10 km run in a time of 31 minutes.
- 21 March - Wales are narrowly defeated by Ireland to finish third overall in the 2009 Six Nations Championship (rugby union).
- June - The first race meeting is held at the newly constructed Ffos Las racecourse.
- 28 December - Blackwood-reared Dream Alliance wins the Welsh Grand National.
- BBC Wales Sports Personality of the Year - Ryan Giggs

== Births ==
- 11 January - Dexter Lloyd Henson, son of Charlotte Church and Gavin Henson

== Deaths ==
- 9 January - T. Llew Jones, writer, 93
- 10 January - Eluned Phillips, writer, 94
- 13 January - Dai Llewellyn, socialite, 62
- 22 January - Vic Crowe, footballer, 76
- 9 February
  - Gareth Alban Davies, academic, 82
  - Reg Davies, footballer, 79
- 10 February - Gerwyn Williams, rugby union footballer, 84
- 14 February - Sir Bernard Ashley, entrepreneur, 82
- 19 February - Ian L. Jenkins, former Surgeon General of the British Armed Forces, 64
- 26 February - Jackie Bowen, Welsh rugby union and rugby league footballer, 93
- 2 March - Gerard Morgan-Grenville, environmentalist, 77
- 12 March - Huw Thomas, broadcaster, lawyer and politician, 81
- 22 March - Emyr Price, historian, 64
- 23 March - Geoff Holmes, cricketer, 50
- 12 April - John Maddox, biologist, 83
- 22 April - Cliff Curvis, British and Commonwealth boxing champion, 81
- May - Ralph Morgan, Welsh rugby union and rugby league footballer, 88?
- 14 May - Ken Hollyman, footballer, 86
- 16 May - Einion Evans, poet, 82
- 31 May - Brian Edrich, former Glamorgan cricket coach, 86
- 5 June - Haydn Tanner, Wales international rugby union footballer, 92
- 19 June - Major Sean Birchall, soldier, 33 (killed on active service)
- 6 July - Bleddyn Williams, rugby union footballer, 86
- 11 July - Geraint Owen, actor and politician, 43
- 27 July - Aeronwy Thomas, writer and daughter of Dylan Thomas, 66
- 18 August - Dic Jones, poet and archdruid, 75
- 28 August - Noel Jones, Anglican bishop, 76
- 6 September - Sir David Glyndwr Tudor Williams, barrister and academic, 78
- 9 September - Stanley Cornwell Lewis, artist, 103
- 7 October - Helen Watts, operatic contralto, 81
- 10 October - Sir Bryan Hopkin, economist, 94
- 11 October - Patrick Hannan, radio and TV journalist, 68
- 17 October - Douglas Blackwell, actor, 85
- 20 October - Hubert Rees, actor
- 12 November - Orig Williams, wrestler and TV presenter, 78
- 16 December - T. G. H. James, Egyptologist, 86
- 30 December - Maldwyn Evans, bowls champion, 72

== See also ==
- 2009 in Northern Ireland
