= 2019 in Wales =

- Centuries: 19th; 20th; 21st
- Decades: 1990s; 2000s; 2010s; 2020s
- See also: List of years in Wales; Timeline of Welsh history 2019 in The United Kingdom England Scotland Elsewhere

Events from the year 2019 in Wales.

== Incumbents ==
- First Minister – Mark Drakeford
- Secretary of State for Wales – Alun Cairns (until 6 November); Simon Hart (from 16 December)
- Archbishop of Wales – John Davies, Bishop of Swansea and Brecon
- Archdruid of the National Eisteddfod of Wales – Geraint Llifon (until 30 June); Myrddin ap Dafydd (from 30 June)
- National Poet of Wales – Ifor ap Glyn

== Events ==
=== January ===
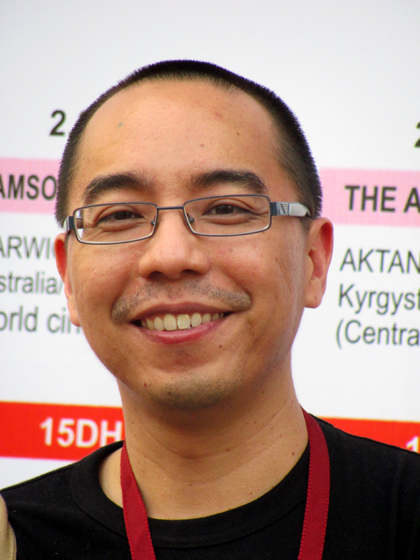
24 Jan: Apichatpong Weerasethakul wins Artes Mundi prize

- 1 January – Sam Warburton, Rhys Jones and David Bedford are revealed as the "mystery runners" in the 60th Nos Galan races.
- 4 January – It is announced that Raytheon has been awarded a multi-million pound contract with the Royal Air Force, preserving 200 jobs in North Wales.
- 18 January – It is announced that a statue of teacher Betty Campbell will be erected in Cardiff, following her selection by a poll of BBC viewers.
- 19 January – A protest march is attended by several hundred people, opposing the demolition of Cardiff's Guildford Crescent, home to the music venue Gwdihŵ that was scheduled to close on 31 January, prior to being demolished along with adjoining buildings.
- 21 January – A search begins for missing Cardiff City F.C. player Emiliano Sala after his plane goes missing while returning to Wales from Nantes in France.
- 24 January – Thai video artist Apichatpong Weerasethakul is announced as winner of the 2019 Artes Mundi prize at a ceremony in Cardiff.

=== February ===
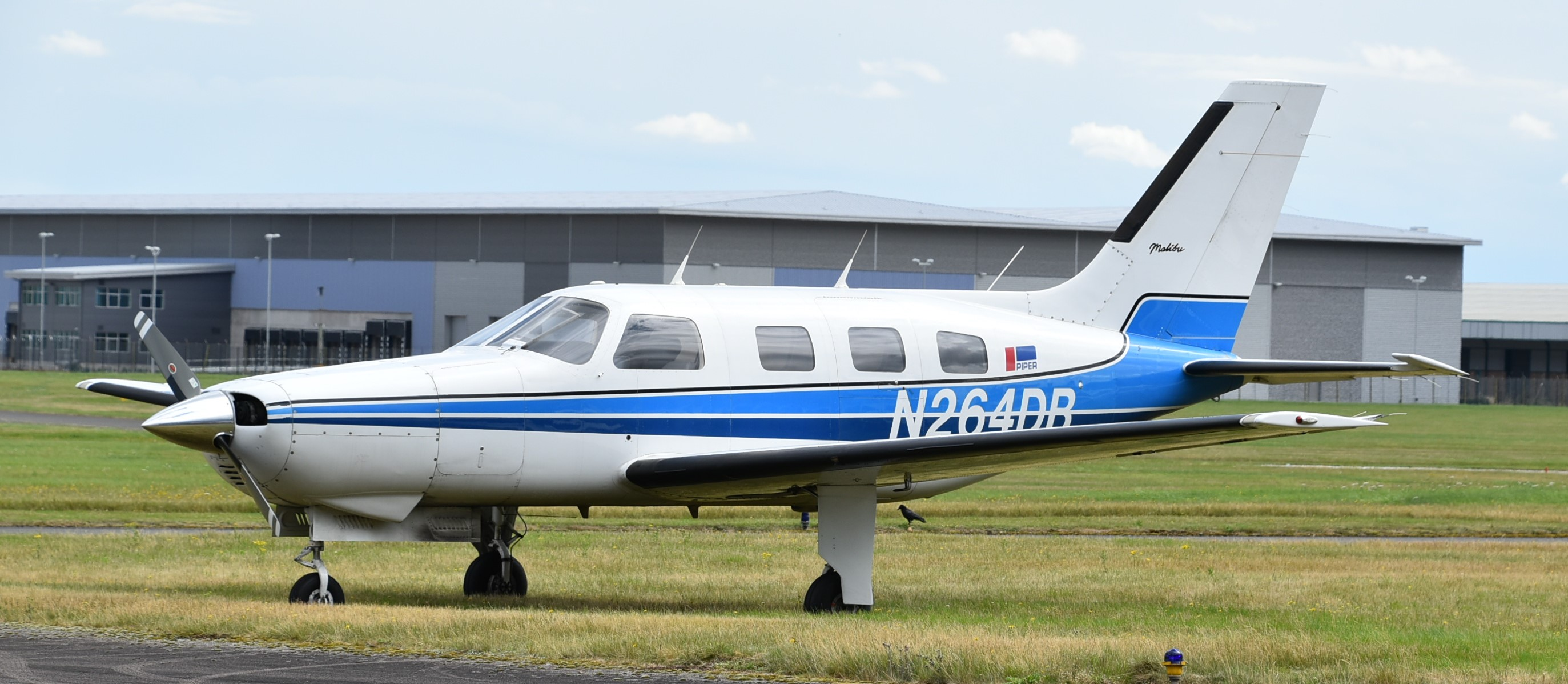
3 Feb: Wreckage of Emiliano Sala's plane is found

- 1 February – The first of over 1,000 job losses at the Ford engine plant in Bridgend, announced in January, are confirmed, with 370 staff expected to take redundancy by the end of 2019.
- 3 February – Wreckage of the Piper Malibu plane carrying Cardiff striker Emiliano Sala is found on the sea bed in the English Channel.
- 8 February – It is confirmed that a body found in the wreckage of the Piper Malibu plane recovered from the English Channel is that of missing Cardiff player Emiliano Sala.
- 21 February – The Crown Prosecution Service confirms that action will be taken against Christopher Davies, MP for Brecon and Radnor, on charges of falsifying Parliamentary expenses.
- 25 February – A temperature of 20.3 °C (68.5 °F) is reported in Trawsgoed, Ceredigion, the UK's highest on record for the month of February until the following day.

=== March ===
- 26 March – Plaid Cymru AM Helen Mary Jones apologises for an inappropriate remark relating to suicide that she made to Conservative AM Mark Isherwood during a debate at the Senedd, following a complaint by Labour MP Jack Sargeant.
- 27 March – The High Court rules that Carwyn Jones, Wales's former First Minister, acted unlawfully in intervening in the inquiry into the death of MP Carl Sargeant.

=== April ===
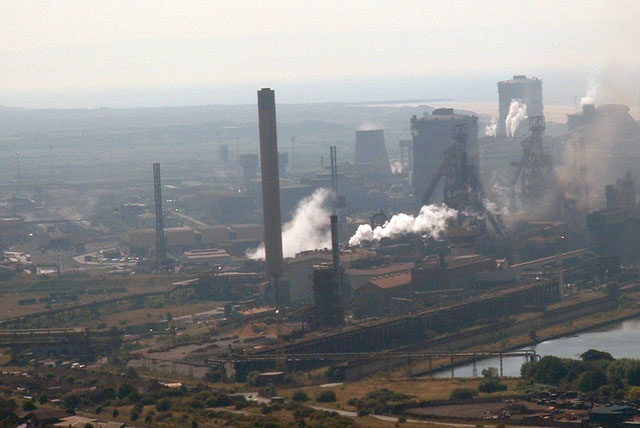
26 April: Accident at Tata steelworks, Port Talbot

- 4 April – Ruth Jones wins the 2019 Newport West by-election (triggered by the death of sitting MP Paul Flynn) for the Labour Party, but with a greatly reduced majority.
- 17 April – Bangor City Council reveals that it is seeking an additional £600,000 in funding in order to complete the repairs required to make the Garth Pier safe and reopen it to the public.
- 23 April – Brecon and Radnorshire MP Chris Davies is fined and sentenced to 50 hours community service for falsifying expenses.
- 25 April – Welsh actor John Rhys-Davies is widely criticised for his "thuggish and sexist" behaviour while appearing as a panellist on the BBC's Question Time.
- 26 April – Two steelworkers are injured by an explosion at Tata's steelworks plant in Port Talbot.

=== May ===
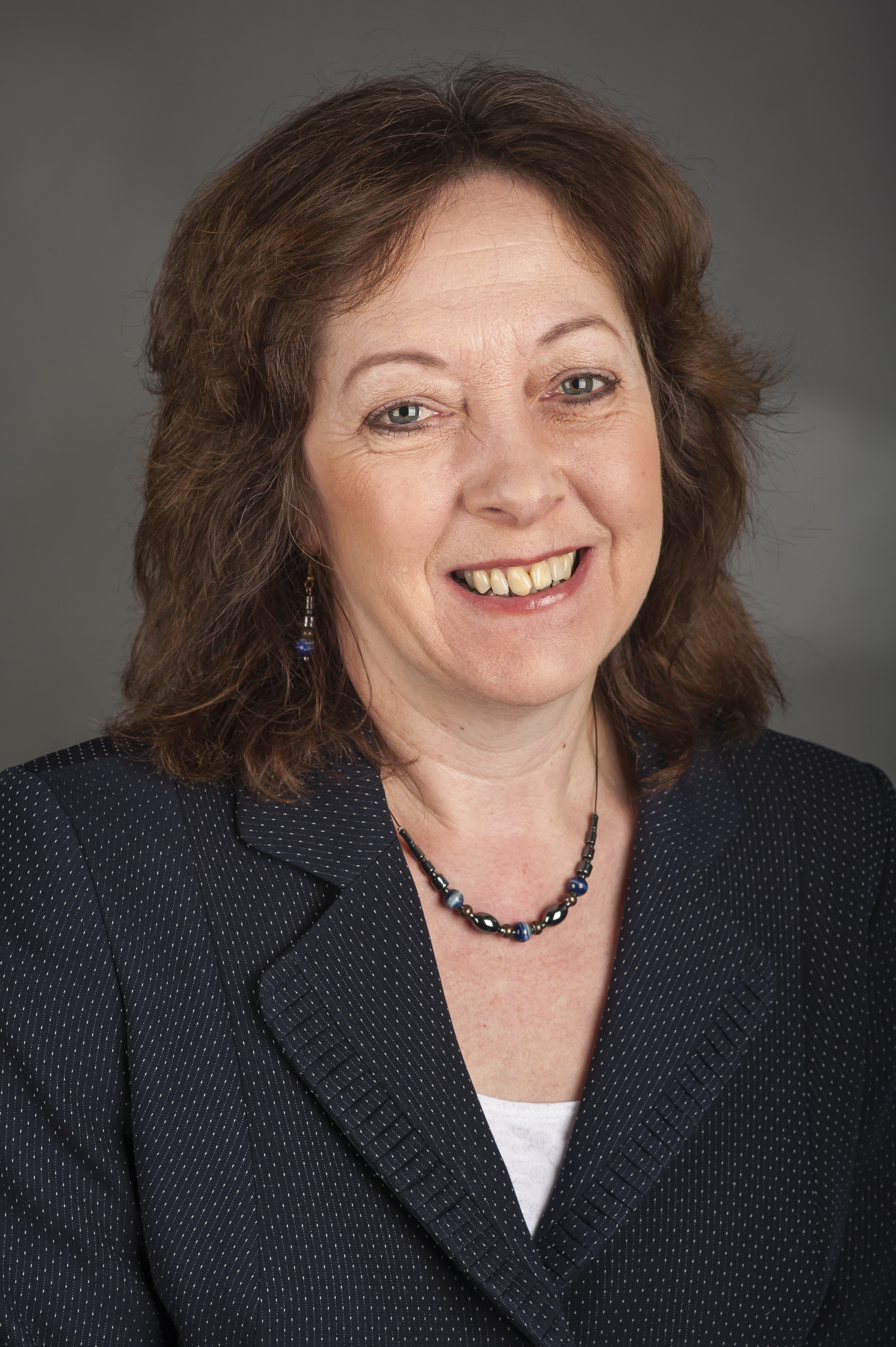
Jill Evans, one of the four incoming European Parliament members for Wales

- 1 May – The Welsh Assembly becomes one of the first governments in the world to declare a national emergency relating to climate change.
- 3 May – At the Welsh Conservative conference in Llangollen, UK prime minister Theresa May is heckled and told to resign by a member who is subsequently ejected from the meeting.
- 14 May – Former MP Mark Reckless, having joined the Welsh Assembly as a UKIP representative in 2016 and joined the Conservative group in 2017, announces he has left the Tories and become an independent AM; now representing the Brexit Party.
- 15 May – Four former UKIP AMs announce that they are joining the Brexit Party.
- 23 May – Former Welsh Government minister Leighton Andrews announces he is leaving the Labour Party and voting for the Green Party in the European elections.
- 26 May – The results of the 2019 European Parliament election in the United Kingdom show a total of 271,404 for the Brexit Party, 163,928 for Plaid Cymru and 127,833 for Labour, giving the Brexit Party two seats, while Plaid and Labour win one each. The Conservative Party loses the only seat it won at the last European election in 2014.
- 27 May - The Cardiff and Vale Urdd National Eisteddfod begins, the first Urdd Eisteddfod without fences.

=== June ===
- 1 June – South Wales Police celebrates the 50th anniversary of its creation.
- 4 June – First Minister Mark Drakeford announces that the M4 relief road project is to be abandoned, citing cost and environmental concerns.
- 6 June – Ford Motor Company announces the closure of its factory in Bridgend, resulting in the loss of around 1,700 jobs.
- 8 June – Welsh people appointed in the 2019 Birthday Honours include Professor Robin Williams (knighthood), Derek Vaughan, MEP (CBE), and Jayne Ludlow (MBE).
- 9 June – Welsh Secretary Alun Cairns announces he is supporting Boris Johnson in the Conservative leadership election.
- 13 June – US President Donald Trump refers to Queen Elizabeth II of the United Kingdom as "the queen of England" and to the Prince of Wales as "Prince of Whales" in a Tweet.

=== July ===
- 3 July
  - Two railway workers are killed by a train near Port Talbot; an investigation is immediately launched by the British Transport Police.
  - St Fagans National Museum of History wins the Museum of the Year award for 2019.
- 11 July – Thomas Burns, S.M., retires as Bishop of Menevia on his 75th birthday. The Roman Catholic Archbishop of Cardiff, George Stack, takes on responsibility for the diocese.
- 14 July – Conservative MP Guto Bebb announces that he will not stand for the party at the next general election because he believes it is dominated by extremists and he supports a second EU referendum.
- 23 July – First Minister Mark Drakeford warns UK Prime Minister-elect Boris Johnson to show "strategic thinking and honesty" in his future conduct, while Plaid Cymru leader Adam Price calls Johnson a "clown".
- 25 July
  - As the UK experiences its hottest day of the year, temperatures at Goggerddan in Mid Wales reach 31.2C.
  - Neil Hamilton, the UKIP leader in the National Assembly, is criticised by Sally Holland, the Children's Commissioner for Wales, for a personal attack on environmental activist Greta Thunberg, whom Hamilton had called "fair game".
- 26 July
  - Professor Richard B Davies is removed from his post as Vice-Chancellor of Swansea University for "gross misconduct". His colleague, Professor Marc Clement, is also dismissed.
  - Mohamad Karkoubi, a Syrian refugee, wins the Welsh Learner award at the Nation of Sanctuary Awards, presented by the Welsh Refugee Council.
  - Sir Bryn Terfel marries harpist Hannah Stone at Caersalem Newydd Baptist Church, Swansea.
- 27 July – Michael Sheen officially opens the 2019 Homeless World Cup in Cardiff.
- 30 July – New UK prime minister Boris Johnson visits Wales and meets First Minister Mark Drakeford in Cardiff. The president of the Farmers' Union of Wales warns that "civil unrest" in rural areas could arise if a "no-deal" Brexit takes place.

=== August ===
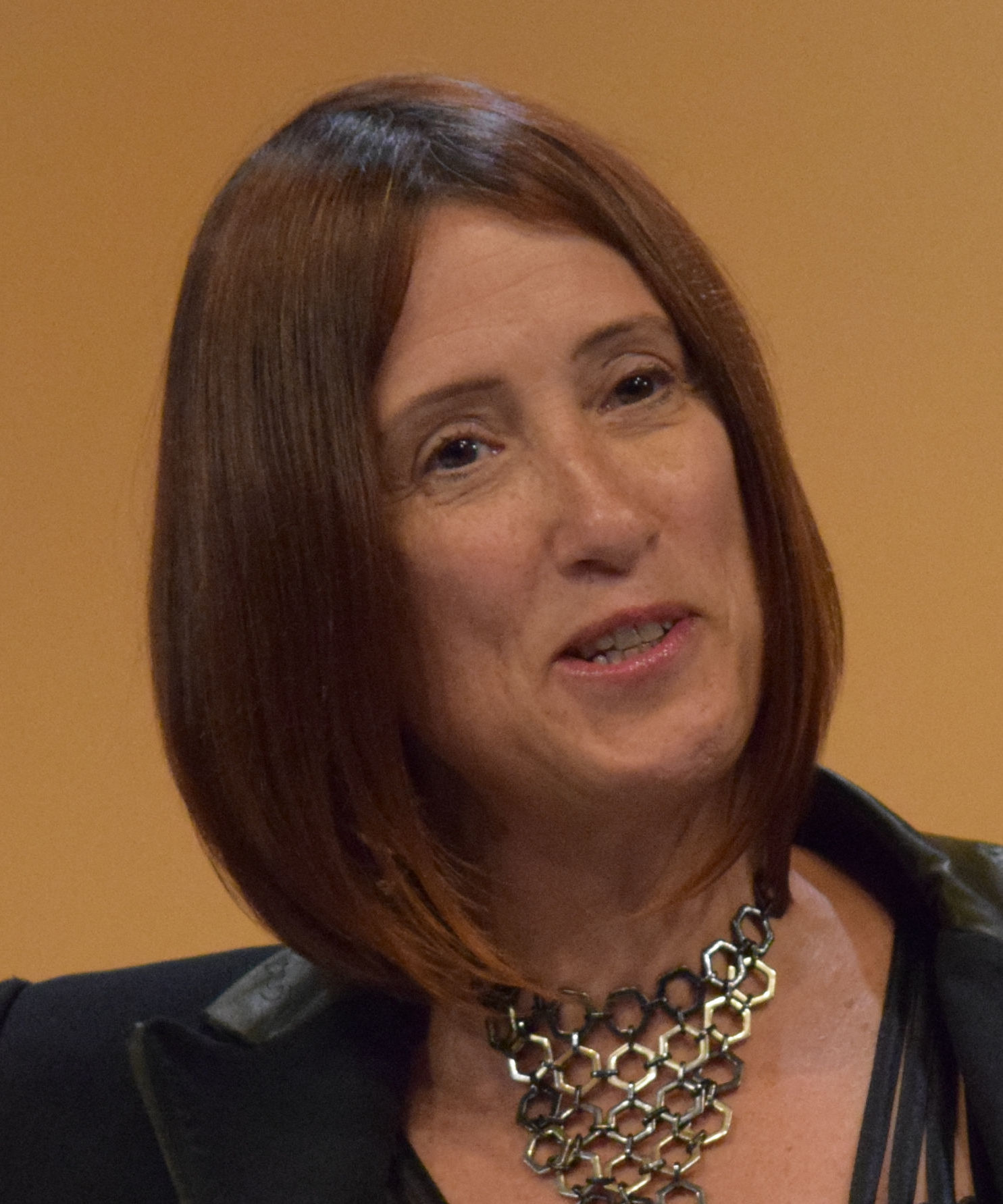
Jane Dodds, Lib Dem MP for Brecon from August until December 2019

- 1 August
  - The Brecon and Radnorshire by-election, caused by the de-selection of sitting MP Chris Davies, is won by Lib Dem candidate Jane Dodds, with a majority of 1,325.
  - Utilities company RWE announces the forthcoming closure of the coal-fired Aberthaw power station, with the loss of 170 jobs.
- 2 August – The 2019 National Eisteddfod of Wales opens at Llanrwst.
- 9 August – On the penultimate day of the National Eisteddfod, a campsite has to be evacuated due to adverse weather conditions, and a planned open-air performance by Dafydd Iwan is moved to the main pavilion.
- 13 August – The director of Swansea developer Enzo's Homes, along with a contractor, is convicted of illegally felling 70 protected trees in the Penllergaer area.
- 16 August – On a visit to Machynlleth, UK Labour Party leader Jeremy Corbyn states that he has "discussed with Mark Drakeford issues of further powers that the Welsh Government or Welsh Parliament would like to have under a Labour Government," adding, "We're open to considering all of that, we're open to considering any future relationship and ideas."
- 28 August – The National Assembly of Wales is recalled from recess at the request of First Minister Mark Drakeford, in order to discuss the actions of the Westminster government with reference to Brexit. The first plenary session is scheduled for 5 September.

=== September ===
- 10 September – In former Prime Minister Theresa May's Resignation Honours, Cllr Debbie Wilcox, leader of Newport City Council, becomes a Labour life peer with the title Debbie Wilcox, Baroness Wilcox, and Byron Davies becomes a Conservative life peer.
- 14 September – Former Welsh rugby international Gareth Thomas announces that he has learned he is HIV positive, with undetectable/untransmittable status, and wants to help break the stigma surrounding his condition.

=== October ===
- 4 October – Plaid Cymru leader Adam Price predicts that a referendum on Welsh independence is likely to be held in the next decade.
- 9 October – Assembly members support a motion to rename the Welsh Assembly; in future it will be called both Senedd Cymru and the Welsh Parliament.
- 10 October – The Welsh Government publishes Reforming Our Union: Shared Governance in the UK, a policy document setting out its proposals for reform of the union.
- 30 October – The Conservative Party suspends former Assembly candidate Ross England after learning of his conduct during a rape trial during 2018.

=== November ===
- 5 November - A leaked e-mail leads to calls for Welsh Secretary Alun Cairns to resign as it is revealed that he was told about the involvement of Conservative Assembly candidate Ross England in "sabotaging" a rape trial in 2018.
- 6 November - Welsh Secretary Alun Cairns resigns from the Cabinet over the Ross England scandal.
- 12 November
  - The remains of a World War II Lockheed P-38 Lightning that crashed into the sea near Harlech, nicknamed the "Maid of Harlech", are given scheduled status by Cadw.
  - Sir Roderick Evans resigns as Commissioner for Standards at the Welsh Assembly, after it is revealed that former AM Neil McEvoy has secretly recorded confidential conversations between Evans and his staff. McEvoy claims that the recordings were made in the public interest.
- 13 November - Former MP Christopher Davies stands down as prospective Conservative candidate for Ynys Môn in the forthcoming UK general election amid complaints about his selection from party members.

=== December ===
- 2 December - Plaid Cymru leader Adam Price reveals the party's election manifesto.
- 3 December - Kizzy Crawford is among those critical of the proposed design of the 2021 census return form, which includes categories for "Black British" and "white Welsh" but not for "Black Welsh".
- 12 December - In the 2019 United Kingdom general election in Wales, the Labour Party loses six seats to the Conservative Party. There is an 8% decrease in Labour's share of the vote, matched by increases in vote share for the Brexit Party and Conservative Party of 5.4% and 2.5%, respectively. The Labour Party receives 40.9% of overall votes, of a total of 1,544,357 votes (representing 66.6% of the electorate). Welsh Liberal leader Jane Dodds loses the seat she won earlier in the year to Conservative Fay Jones.
- 16 December - Simon Hart, MP, is appointed Secretary of State for Wales.
- 20 December - An inquiry into former Welsh Secretary Alun Cairns's conduct over the Ross England rape trial incident finds that it is "unlikely" that Cairns knew nothing about Ross England's role in the trial, but there is no evidence to contradict his statement that he did not know about the details of the case.
- 27 December - The 2020 New Year Honours list is announced. Politician Andrew R. T. Davies receives the CBE and Olympic double gold medallist Jade Jones receives the OBE, while footballer Loren Dykes gets the MBE.

== Arts and culture ==
- Y Gaer (cultural hub) opens in Brecon.

=== National Eisteddfod of Wales ===
- Chair – T. James Jones
- Crown – Guto Dafydd
- Prose Medal – Rhiannon Ifans
- Gwobr Goffa Daniel Owen: Guto Dafydd, Carafanio

=== Welsh Awards ===
- Wales Book of the Year 2019:
  - English language: Ailbhe Darcy, Insistence
  - Welsh language: Manon Steffan Ros, Llyfr Glas Nebo

=== New books ===
==== English language ====
- David Callander – Narrative Progress in Early Welsh and English Poetry (University of Wales Press)
- Phil Carradice – Following in the Footsteps of Henry Tudor (Pen and Sword Books)
- Eric Ngalle Charles – I, Eric Ngalle: One Man's Journey Crossing Continents from Africa to Europe
- Daran Hill - The Public Affairs Guide to Wales - The Handbook of Effective and Ethical Lobbying
- Martin Johnes - Wales: England’s Colony?

==== Welsh language ====
- Guto Dafydd – Carafanio
- Myrddin ap Dafydd – Pentre Du, Pentre Gwyn

=== Music ===
==== New albums ====
- Alffa – Rhyddid o’r Cysgodion Gwenwynig
- Cate Le Bon – Reward
- Catfish and the Bottlemen – The Balance
- Stereophonics – Kind

==== New compositions ====
- Gareth Glyn – Pendramwnwgl

=== Film ===
- Eternal Beauty, written and directed by Craig Roberts, completes filming in Wales; the cast includes Morfydd Clark.
- Mr. Jones stars James Norton as Welsh journalist Gareth Jones.
- The Two Popes stars Anthony Hopkins and Jonathan Pryce in the title roles.

=== Broadcasting ===
==== English language ====
- The 1900 Island
- Funny Nation, presented by Elis James
- Hidden Heroines, presented by Cerys Matthews; the result of the vote is announced on 18 January.
- Tourist Trap
- Tudur's TV Flashback, presented by Tudur Owen

==== Welsh language ====
- Merched Parchus, starring Hanna Jarman, S4C's first production to go straight to streaming.
- Un Bore Mercher, series 2

== Sport ==
=== Cycling ===
- 29 July – Reigning champion Geraint Thomas finishes second in the 2019 Tour de France.

=== Football ===
- 11 November – Cardiff City F.C. manager Neil Warnock leaves the club unexpectedly after just over three years as manager.

=== Horse racing ===
- 27 December – Potters Corner, trained by Christian Williams at Ogmore-by-Sea, ridden by Welsh jockey Jack Tudor and part-owned by Jonathan Davies, becomes the first Welsh Grand National winner trained in Wales since 1965.

=== Rugby union ===
- 1 February – Wales defeat France 24–19 in Paris, in their first match of the 2019 Six Nations Championship, having been 16–0 down at half time.
- 16 March – At the conclusion of the 2019 Six Nations Championship, Wales win the Grand Slam for the third time in eleven years.
- 1 November – Wales are defeated by New Zealand in the Bronze Final of the 2019 Rugby World Cup in Tokyo.
- 10 December – Alun Wyn Jones wins the BBC Cymru Sports Personality of the Year Award.

== Births ==
- 6 May – Archie Mountbatten-Windsor, first child of the Duke and Duchess of Sussex and grandson of the Prince of Wales.

== Deaths ==
- 11 January – Steffan Lewis, AM, Plaid Cymru politician, 34 (bowel cancer)
- 17 January –
  - Windsor Davies, actor, 88
  - Garfield Owen, rugby union and league player, 86 (death announced on this date)
- 21 January – Emiliano Sala, footballer, 28 (assumed date of death)
- 17 February – Paul Flynn, MP for Newport West (since 1987), 84
- 4 March – Garfield Davies, Baron Davies of Coity, trade union leader and politician, 84
- 25 March – Barrie Hole, footballer, 76
- 1 April – Billy Mainwaring, rugby player, 78
- 13 May – Mari Griffith, broadcaster, singer and writer, 79
- 2 June – Barry Hughes, football manager, 81
- 8 June – Noel Lloyd, academic, 72
- 14 June – Kelvin Thomas, singer, composer, conductor and author, 99
- 21 June – William Simons, actor, 79
- 25 June – Eurig Wyn, journalist and politician, MEP (1999–2004), 74
- 30 June – Glyn Houston, actor, 93
- 5 July – Sir Wynn Hugh-Jones, diplomat, administrator and politician, 95
- 13 July – Rod Richards, politician, 72
- 30 July
  - Ron Hughes, footballer and manager, 89
  - Malcolm Nash, cricketer, 74
- 9 August – Huw O. Pritchard, chemist and academic, 91
- 12 August – Robyn Léwis, Welsh author, politician and archdruid, Vice President of Plaid Cymru (1970–1976), 89
- 20 August – Richard Booth, bookseller, 80
- 26 August – Ray Henwood, Welsh-born New Zealand actor, 82
- 3 September – David Evans, Welsh-born Australian politician, 94
- 12 September – Stan Owen, dual-code rugby player, 90
- 25 September – Raymond Roberts, Royal Navy chaplain, 88
- 27 September – Russell Robins, dual-code rugby player, 87
- 4 October – Elmer Rees, mathematician, 77
- 21 October – Richard Gregson, film producer, screenwriter and talent agent, 89
- 1 November
  - Daniel Mullins, Bishop of Menevia 1987–2001, 90
  - Paul Turner, film director, 73
- 21 November – Sir Donald Gordon, South African businessman after whom the main auditorium of the Wales Millennium Centre is named, 89
- 23 December
  - Alan Harrington, international footballer, 86
  - Billy Slade, cricketer, 78
