= 2022 in Wales =

- Centuries: 19th; 20th; 21st
- Decades: 2000s; 2010s; 2020s
- See also: List of years in Wales; Timeline of Welsh history 2022 in The United Kingdom England Scotland Elsewhere Welsh football: • 2022–23

Events from the year 2022 in Wales.

== Incumbents ==
- First Minister – Mark Drakeford
- Secretary of State for Wales – Simon Hart (until 6 July) and Robert Buckland (until 25 October) David T. C. Davies (from 25 October)
- Archbishop of Wales – Andy John, Bishop of Bangor
- Archdruid of the National Eisteddfod of Wales – Myrddin ap Dafydd
- National Poet of Wales – Ifor ap Glyn

== Events ==
=== January ===
- 1 January – The 2022 New Year Honours List includes Olympic sportswomen Hannah Mills (OBE) and Lauren Price (MBE). Chief Medical Officer for Wales Dr Frank Atherton receives a knighthood, and Professor Julie Lydon becomes a Dame.
- 14 January – First Minister Mark Drakeford announces that COVID restrictions in Wales are to be eased, following a fall in case numbers, and the country will move gradually towards level zero.
- 21 January – At a press conference in Cardiff, Mark Drakeford makes an outspoken attack on UK Prime Minister Boris Johnson for failing to take appropriate precautionary measures against COVID-19. Drakeford suggests that Johnson's government is trying to protect Johnson's position by distracting attention from his record.

=== February ===
- 4 February – "Dydd Miswig Cymru" (Welsh Language Music Day) is celebrated.
- 10 February – The Welsh Government announces that social care workers in Wales will receive a one-off £1000 payment in April.
- 14 February – The Future Generations Commissioner for Wales, Sophie Howe, proposes that a four-day working week be trialled by the Welsh Government.
- 16 February – The Welsh Government announces a payment of £1,600 per month for young people leaving care when they turn 18. The Welsh Conservatives say it is "a waste of money".
- 23 February – Two members of the Welsh Parliament, Adam Price and Mick Antoniw are reprimanded by the UK Foreign Office for visiting Ukraine.
- 27 February – Four children are rescued from rocks in the River Rhondda by a coastguard helicopter.

=== March ===
- 12 March – At the start of the Welsh Labour Party conference in Llandudno, Mark Drakeford criticises the UK government's response to the 2022 Russian invasion of Ukraine, saying: "This is a government which worries about the human rights of oligarchs but the Home Secretary sends exhausted refugees on a European hunt for a bureaucrat willing to accept their visa application." It is the first Welsh Labour conference to be attended by Sir Keir Starmer in his role as UK Labour leader.
- 30 March – Bridgend MP Jamie Wallis states that he is suffering from gender dysphoria, and claims that he left the scene of a road accident the previous November because he was "not OK" after being raped two months earlier.

=== April ===
- 4 April – Senedd members Paul Davies, Darren Millar, Nick Ramsay and Alun Davies are cleared of breaking the law by drinking alcohol on the premises, in a report by the Senedd standards commissioner, Douglas Bain.
- 28 April – South Wales Police charge Bridgend MP Jamie Wallis with careless driving, failing to report an accident, and leaving a vehicle in a dangerous position, following the incident in November 2021.

=== May ===
- 5 May – The 2022 Welsh local elections are contested under new boundaries. This was the first time Welsh councils could choose between the current first-past-the-post system and a proportional single transferable vote (STV) system, but councils need to give advance notice of such a change. Overall, Welsh Labour gain control of one council and Plaid Cymru three, whilst the Welsh Conservatives lose one and Independents two.
- 26 May – The Hay Festival opens in Hay-on-Wye, Powys. The festival's guest speakers include Stephen Fry, Sheila Hancock, Benedict Cumberbatch, Damian Lewis and former US Secretary of State, Hillary Clinton.
- 30 May - The Denbighshire Urdd National Eisteddfod starts near Denbigh, without admission charges.

=== June ===
- 2 June – Welsh people receiving awards in the Queen's Platinum Jubilee birthday honours include actor Jonathan Pryce (knighthood), singer Beverley Humphreys (MBE) and rugby player Ryan Jones (MBE). Footballer Gareth Bale and singer Bonnie Tyler also receive the MBE, while weather presenter Derek Brockway gets the BEM.
- 4 June – The 2022 Urdd eisteddfod ends in Denbighshire, having attracted record crowds.
- 22 June – Labour MS Eluned Morgan is censured by the Senedd after being banned from driving for six months for repeated speeding offences. Morgan is formally reprimanded after the censure motion is passed unanimously.
- 29 June – The Queen's Commonwealth Baton Relay arrives in Anglesey, and will stop at 22 locations over the following five days before reaching Swansea. This is in the run up to the 2022 Commonwealth Games in Birmingham.

=== July ===
- 2 July – An estimated 5,000 people march through Wrexham as part of a pro-Welsh independence demonstration organised by All Under One Banner Cymru.
- 11 July – Bridgend MP Jamie Wallis is fined £2,500 and disqualified from driving for six months after being found guilty of motoring offences. District Judge Tan Ikram said he "didn't find the defendant credible".
- 18 July – The Royal Welsh Show opens at its permanent showground in Builth Wells.
- 30 July–6 August – The National Eisteddfod of Wales finally takes place at Tregaron, after a two-year delay because of the COVID-19 pandemic.

=== August ===
- 8 August – Former Wales footballer and manager Ryan Giggs appears at Manchester Crown Court on a charge of assault.
- 19 August – Following a prolonged period of dry weather, a drought is declared in north Ceredigion, Teifi, Pembrokeshire, Carmarthen, Swansea, Llanelli, Neath Port Talbot and Bridgend.
- 31 August – A major fire breaks out at Mumbles Pier.

=== September ===
- 8 September – Following the death of Queen Elizabeth II, her son Charles, Prince of Wales, becomes King Charles III.
- 9 September – William, the elder son of King Charles III, is confirmed as the new Prince of Wales. His wife Catherine becomes Princess of Wales.
- 16 September – King Charles III pays his first visit as monarch to Wales, to meet political leaders and attend a religious service at Llandaff Cathedral.
- 22 September – The Welsh Government introduces a bill to the Senedd to ban single-use plastics, including such items as cups and lids, cutlery, drink-stirrers, takeaway food containers, straws, plates and carrier bags.
- 28 September – The Prince and Princess of Wales pay their first official visit to Wales in their new roles.

=== October ===
- 2 October – 30 bags of cocaine are found, by a dog walker, washed up on a beach south of Aberystwyth. They are estimated to have a street value of up to £90 million.
- 7 October – Gwynedd Council vote in favour of calling for an end to the title Prince of Wales. It also decides there will be no investiture for the new Prince of Wales in Gwynedd.
- 31 October – Aberystwyth (together with the surrounding county of Ceredigion) becomes Wales' first UNESCO City of Literature.

=== November ===
- 10 November – More than 230,000 schoolchildren from more than 1,000 schools in Wales (and two schools in London) sing Yma o Hyd together online. It is to celebrate the Wales men's football team qualifying for the FIFA World Cup.
- 14 November – The Prince of Wales makes a presentation to the England World Cup; his comments are criticised by representatives of the other UK nations. He later responds saying he supports "both England and Wales".

=== December ===
- 21 December – In a survey of house prices, Westbourne Crescent, Cardiff, is named Wales's most expensive street.
- 23 December – An investigation is launched into the finances of Betsi Cadwaladr University Health Board after Audit Wales discover a discrepancy of £122 million.

== Arts and culture ==
=== National Eisteddfod of Wales ===
- Chair: Llŷr Gwyn Lewis
- Crown: Esyllt Maelor
- Prose Medal: Sioned Erin Hughes
- Drama Medal: Gruffydd Siôn Ywain

=== Urdd National Eisteddfod ===
- Chair: Ciarán Eynon
- Crown: Twm Ebbsworth

=== Awards ===
- Wales Book of the Year 2022:
  - English language: Nadifa Mohamed, The Fortune Men
  - Welsh language: Ffion Dafis, Mori

=== New books ===
==== English language ====
- Martin Shipton – Mr Jones – The Man Who Knew Too Much – The Life and Death of Gareth Jones

==== Welsh language ====
- Hywel Gwynfryn – Atgofion drwy Ganeuon: Anfonaf Eiriau

=== Music ===
==== Albums ====
- Adwaith – Bato Mato
- Cate Le Bon – Pompeii
- Novo Amor – Antarctican Dream Machine

=== Film ===
- Save the Cinema, directed by Sara Sugarman, starring Jonathan Pryce and Wynne Evans

=== Broadcasting ===
==== English language radio ====
- Huw Stephens and Aleighcia Scott take over as presenters of the Evening Show on BBC Radio Wales.

==== English language television ====
- Late Night Football Club
- Legends of Welsh Sport
- Slammed (documentary series)
- Together Stronger
- TV Flashback (new series presented by Kiri Pritchard-McLean)

==== Welsh language radio ====
- 3 August – The BBC announces that Radio Cymru 2's broadcasting hours will be increased from 15 hours a week to 60 hours a week.

==== Welsh language television ====
- Bois 58
- Cewri Cwpan y Byd
- Dal y Mellt
- Gogglebocs Cymru
- Y Golau/The Light in The Hall, starring Joanna Scanlan, Alexandra Roach and Iwan Rheon
- Y Goleudy, starring Dewi Wykes

==== Awards ====
- BAFTA Cymru awards:
  - Best actor: Owen Teale
  - Best actress: Emilia Jones
  - Television drama: In My Skin

== Sport ==
- 7 January – Chester F.C., whose ground, the Deva Stadium, is partly in Wales, announce that the club is being investigated for a potential breach of Wales's COVID regulations, after allowing spectators at two matches in the stadium in December 2021 and January 2022.
- 6 March – 2022 Welsh Open snooker championship is won by Joe Perry, the oldest player to win the event.
- 6 June – The Wales national football team qualifies for the FIFA World Cup final rounds, for the first time since 1958, by defeating Ukraine 1-0 in Cardiff.
- 7 August - Callum Shinkwin wins the 2022 Cazoo Wales Open golf tournament at Celtic Manor Resort.
- 13 August – After winning a silver medal for Wales in the mixed triathlon relay at the 2022 Commonwealth Games, Non Stanford goes on to win the Europe Triathlon Championships, and announces her retirement.
- 5 December – Warren Gatland is re-appointed Head Coach of the Wales national rugby union team, following the departure of Wayne Pivac as a result of a review of the team's performance at the 2022 Autumn Nations Series.
- 21 December- Olivia Breen is named BBC Cymru Wales Sports Personality of the Year.
- 27 December – The 2022 Welsh Grand National takes place at Chepstow Racecourse. The race is won by The Two Amigos, trained by Nicky Martin and ridden by Welsh jockey David Prichard.

== Deaths ==
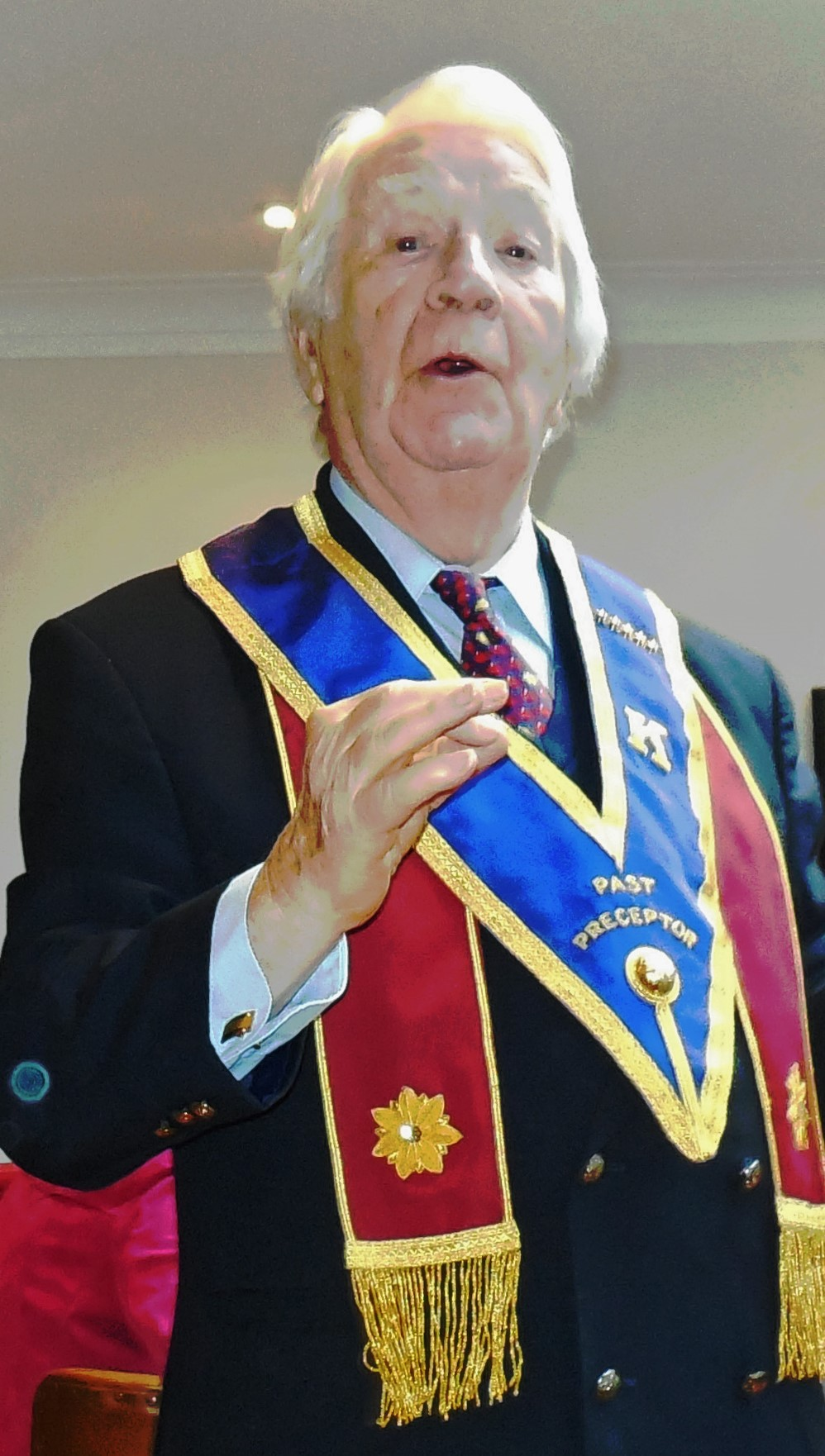
Wyn Calvin

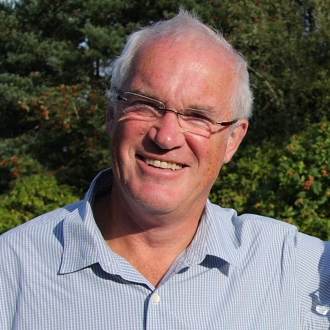
Eddie Butler

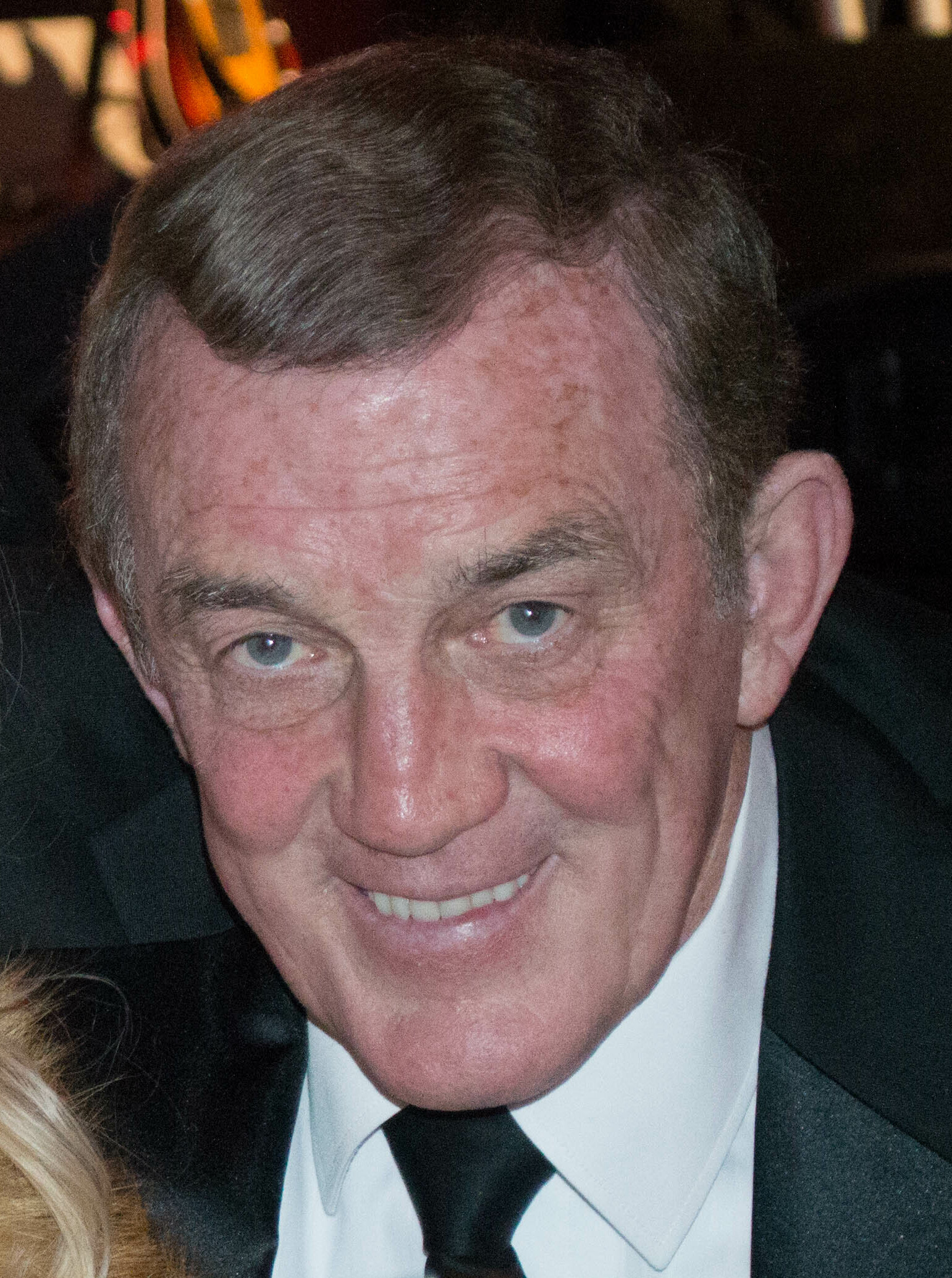
Phil Bennett

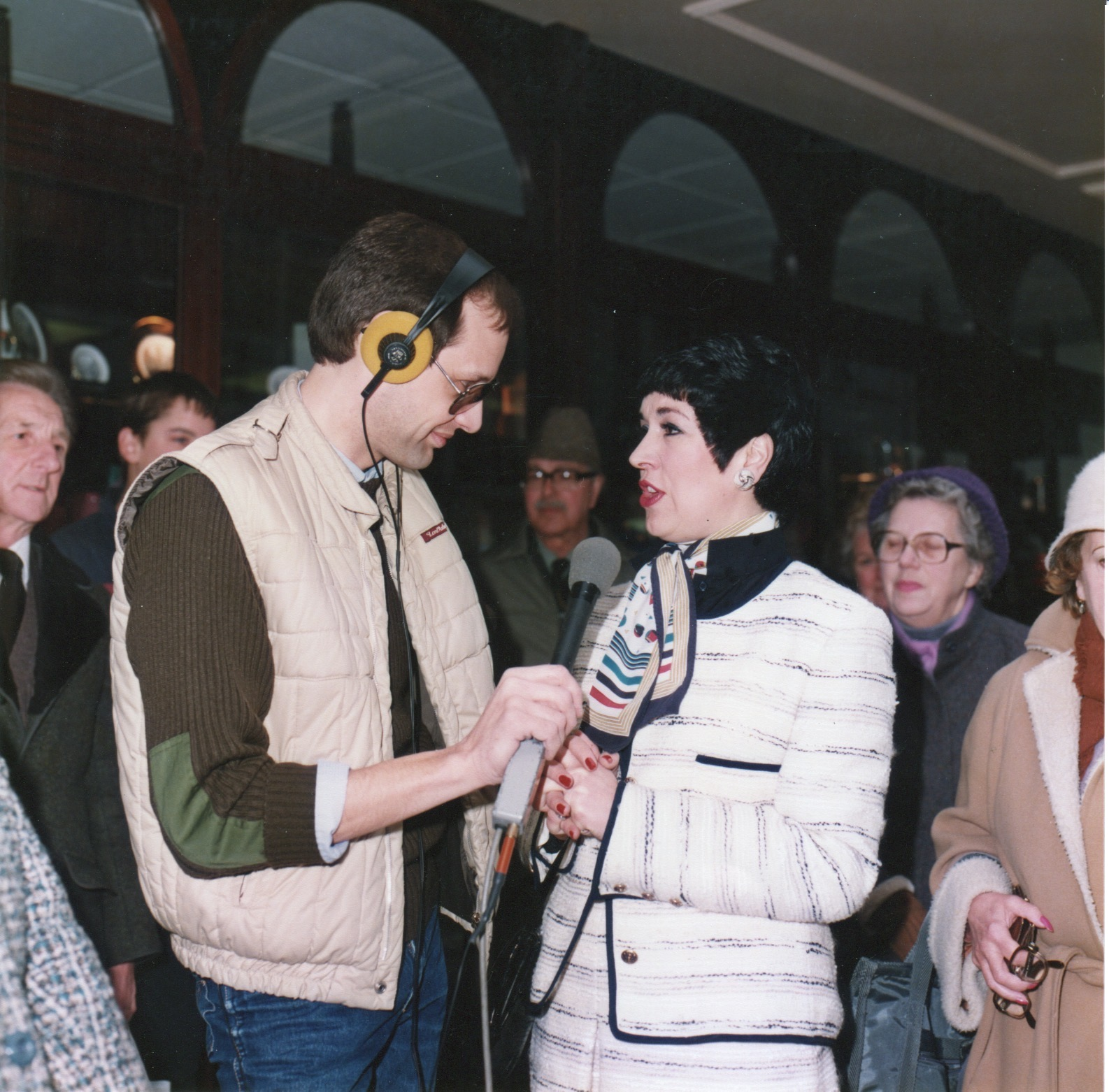
Ruth Madoc (right)

- 8 January – Keith Todd, footballer, 80
- 10 January – Burke Shelley, rock singer, musician and songwriter, 71
- 12 January – Taffy Thomas, jockey, 76
- 21 January – Howard Radford, footballer, 91
- 25 January – Wyn Calvin, entertainer, 96
- 14 February – Aled Roberts, politician, 59
- 20 February – Stewart Bevan, actor, 73
- 4 March
  - Ruth Bidgood, poet, 99
  - Iwan Edwards, Welsh-Canadian choral conductor, 84.
  - Dai Jones, television presenter, singer and radio broadcaster, 78
  - Colin Lewis, cyclist, 79
- 17 March – Alan Rees, rugby player and cricketer, 84
- 1 April – Richard Cyril Hughes, historian and novelist, 89
- 15 April – Peter Swales, historian, 73
- 29 April – Clive Griffiths, footballer, 67
- 10 May – Glyn Shaw, dual-code rugby player, 71
- 18 May – Brian Bedford, footballer, 88
- 8 June – David Lloyd-Jones, English-born conductor of Welsh parentage, 87
- 12 June – Phil Bennett, rugby player, 73
- 13 July – Chris Stuart, journalist, songwriter and radio and television presenter and producer, 73
- 17 July – Billy Davies, Glamorgan cricketer, 86
- 5 August – Aled Owen, footballer, 88
- 24 August – Ken Jones, rugby player, 81
- 27 August – Tony Nelson, footballer, 92
- 29 August – Mick Bates, English-born politician, 74
- 8 September – Mavis Nicholson, writer and broadcaster, 91
- 15 September – Eddie Butler, rugby player, 65
- 8 November – Bobby Wanbon, dual-code rugby player, 78
- 20 November – Frank Rankmore, footballer, 83
- 23 November – Elvey MacDonald, Eisteddfodwr, 81
- 9 December – Ruth Madoc, actress and singer, 79
- 11 December – Mel James, dual code rugby player, 74
- 22 December – Ronan Vibert, Penarth-raised actor, 58
- 29 December – Brian Davies, animal welfare activist, 87
