= 2014 in Wales =

- Centuries: 19th; 20th; 21st
- Decades: 1990s; 2000s; 2010s; 2020s
- See also: List of years in Wales; Timeline of Welsh history 2014 in The United Kingdom England Scotland Elsewhere

This article is about the particular significance of the year 2014 to Wales and its people.

== Incumbents ==
- First Minister – Carwyn Jones
- Secretary of State for Wales – David Jones
- Archbishop of Wales – Barry Morgan, Bishop of Llandaff
- Archdruid of the National Eisteddfod of Wales – Christine James

== Events ==
- 1 January
  - Flooding affects many parts of Wales after several days of heavy rainfall. The worst-affected areas include the Amman Valley and parts of Pembrokeshire.
  - The 30th annual New Year's Day swim at Saundersfoot attracts over a thousand participants.
- 31 January – Ann Clwyd announces that she is to stand down as a parliamentary MP at the 2015 general election.
- February – Caerphilly County Borough Council launches the first dual Welsh/English language Heroes Welcome scheme.
- 2 February – It is announced that the wartime grave of Welsh artist Gwen John has been located in France.
- 18 February – Appeal Court judges rule that the life sentence passed on Mark Bridger for the murder of April Jones is legal and should be allowed to stand. Bridger had already abandoned his appeal against the sentence.
- 25 February – First Minister Carwyn Jones begins an official 5-day visit to the United States, during which he meets members of the recently formed Friends of Wales Caucus, led by Congressman Morgan Griffith.
- 11 March
  - Week In, Week Out reveals that the developers of the proposed Circuit of Wales have asked the Welsh and UK governments to commit up to £50m towards the scheme.
  - Plaid Cymru's Sustainable Communities group publishes its own "Property and Planning Bill" enshrining the six main principles of its Property Act and establishing the Welsh language as a statutory material consideration in the planning system.
- 13 March – Dafydd Elis-Thomas loses his role as transport spokesperson and chair of the assembly's environment committee, as a result of criticisms of party leader Leanne Wood.
- 2 April – Welsh Health Minister Mark Drakeford announces that the Welsh Government is considering a ban on electronic cigarettes in public places.
- 29 to 30 April – Queen Elizabeth II of the United Kingdom makes a 2-day visit to Wales.
- 19 May – Businesses close and hundreds line the streets of Cowbridge for the funeral of a local man killed in an army helicopter crash in Afghanistan.
- 24 May – The Queen's Baton arrives in Wales for a week-long journey, on its way to the Commonwealth Games in Glasgow.
- 26 to 31 May – Urdd National Eisteddfod held in Bala, Gwynedd.
- 6 June – Welsh veterans of the D-Day landings return to Normandy to take part in the 70th anniversary commemoration.
- 7 June – The newly discovered archeological remains of a medieval convent, cemetery and Tudor mansion in Ceredigion are opened to view by the public.
- 24 June – Glyndŵr University loses the right to enrol overseas students as a result of an investigation into the fraudulent use of English language qualifications.
- 1 July – The Prince of Wales and Duchess of Cornwall visit Dyffryn Gardens.
- 14 July – David Jones loses his position as Secretary of State for Wales in a Cabinet reshuffle.
- 15 July – Stephen Crabb is appointed Secretary of State for Wales.
- 21 July – British prime minister David Cameron attends the Royal Welsh Show at Builth Wells.
- 2 to 9 August – National Eisteddfod of Wales held in Llanelli, Carmarthenshire.
- 1 September – Replacement Pont Briwet opens to rail traffic.
- 4-5 September – The 2014 NATO Summit is held at Newport. It is the first time a NATO summit has been held in Britain outside London.
- 22 September – Mark Drakeford announces that Wales is to be the only UK country to date where the cancer drug Abraxane will be available from the NHS.
- November – Milford Haven Refinery decommissioned.
- 28 to 29 December – Wales experiences the coldest night of the year, with temperatures down to −6.7 °C in parts of Carmarthenshire, Ceredigion and Powys.
- 30 December – Welsh recipients of New Year Honours include Mary Quant (DBE), Paul Silk (KCB), Shân Legge-Bourke (DCVO) and Professor Teresa Rees (CBE).

== Arts and culture ==
=== Welsh Awards ===
- Glyndŵr Award - Angharad Price
- National Eisteddfod of Wales: Chair – Ceri Wyn Jones
- National Eisteddfod of Wales: Crown – Guto Dafydd
- National Eisteddfod of Wales: Prose Medal – Lleucu Roberts
- National Eisteddfod of Wales: Drama Medal – Dewi Wyn Williams, La Primera Cena
- Gwobr Goffa Daniel Owen: Lleucu Roberts, Rhwng Edafedd
- Wales Book of the Year:
  - English language:
    - Fiction: Francesca Rhydderch The Rice Paper Diaries
    - Non-fiction: Meic Stephens Rhys Davies: A Writer's Life
    - Poetry - Owen Sheers - Pink Mist (English language Book of the Year)
  - Welsh language:
    - Fiction - Ioan Kidd Dewis (Welsh Language Book of the Year)
    - Non-fiction: Alan Llwyd Bob: Cofiant R. Williams Parry 1884 – 1956
    - Poetry: Christine James Rhwng y Llinellau
- Urdd National Eisteddfod: Chair - Gruffudd Antur

=== New books ===
==== English language ====
- Russell Deacon - The Welsh Liberals: the History of the Liberal and Liberal Democrat Parties in Wales
- Jonathan Edwards - My Family and Other Superheroes (winner of Poetry Award in 2014 Costa Book Awards)
- Griff Rhys Jones - Insufficiently Welsh
- Lonely Planet: Wales

==== Welsh language ====
- Guto Dafydd - Ni Bia'r Awyr
- Jerry Hunter - Ebargofiant
- Euros Lewis - Agor y Llen ar y Ddrama Gymraeg

=== Music ===
==== Awards ====
- Cân i Gymru – Mirain Evans, Galw Amdanat Ti
- Welsh Music Prize – Joanna Gruesome, Weird Sister

==== Albums ====
- Euros Childs - Eilaaig
- Katherine Jenkins - Home Sweet Home
- Manic Street Preachers - Futurology
- Gruff Rhys - American Interior
- Rhydian Roberts - One Day like This

==== New compositions ====
- Karl Jenkins – The Healer - A Cantata for St Luke
- John Metcalf - Under Milk Wood: An Opera

=== Film ===
- Andy Goddard - Set Fire to the Stars
- Lloyd Handley - Third Row Centre (winner of the Best Feature Film award at the 2014 Madrid International Film Festival.
- John Bryan Evans - Cysgod Rhyfel
- Pride

== Sport ==
=== Awards ===
- BBC Cymru Wales Sports Personality of the Year – Geraint Thomas

=== In sports ===
==== Commonwealth Games ====
- 25 July – Athlete Rhys Williams is suspended from competition after failing a drugs test.
- 3 August – Wales finish the 2014 Commonwealth Games with a record medal total of 36. This count included five gold medals, won by Francesca Jones (gymnastics), Geraint Thomas (cycling), Natalie Powell (judo), Jazz Carlin and Georgia Davies (swimming). During the closing ceremony Francesca Jones was awarded the David Dixon Award as the outstanding athlete of the Games.

==== Athletics ====
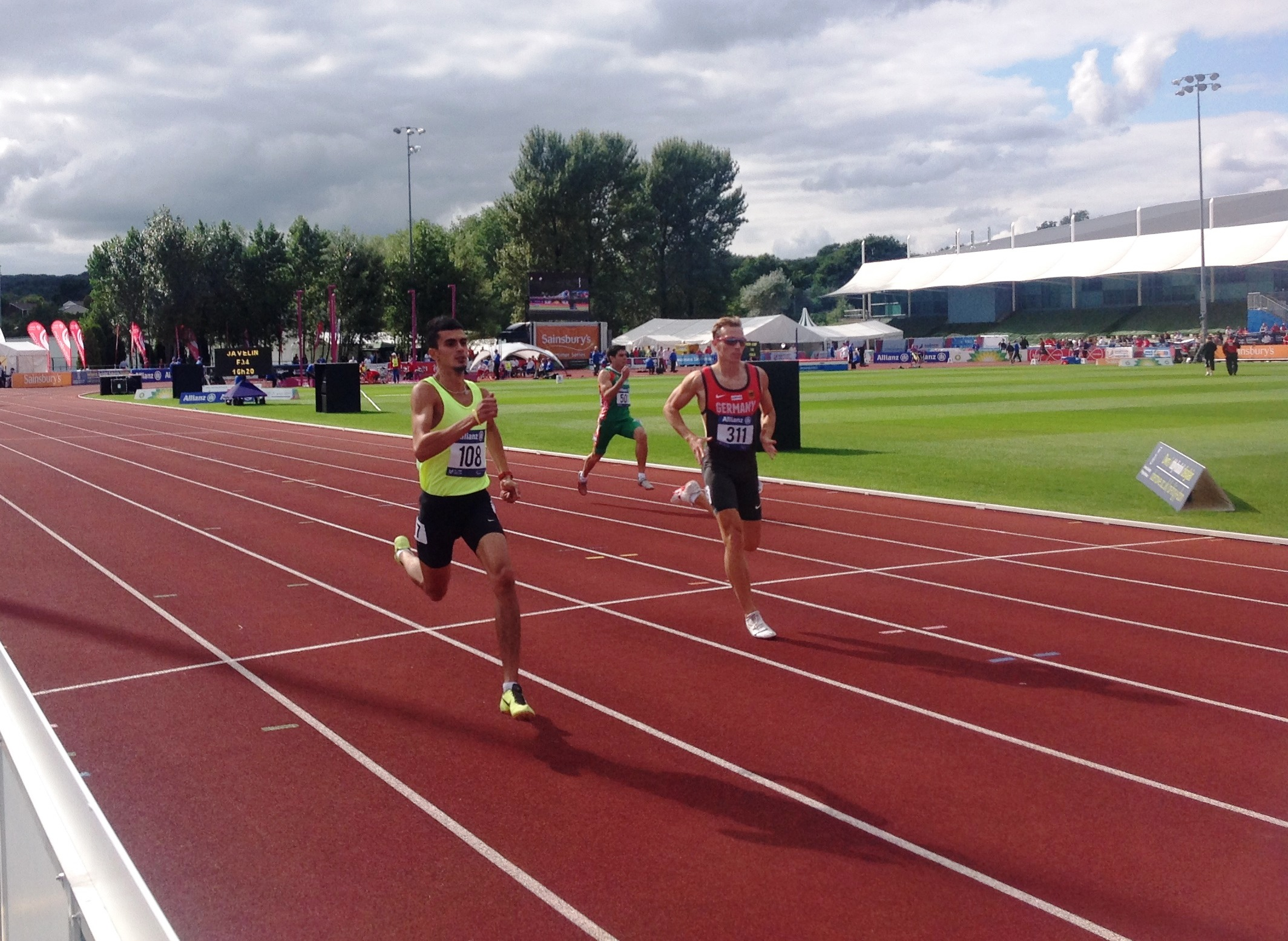
Athletes at the 2014 IPC European Championships in Swansea.

- 18 – 24 August, Swansea hosts the fourth IPC Athletics European Championships, held at Swansea University Stadium.

==== Cycling ====
- 28 February – At the 2014 UCI Track Cycling World Championships, Cardiff's Elinor Barker, along with team members Laura Trott, Katie Archibald and Joanna Rowsell, takes gold in the team pursuit in Cali, Colombia.
- 29 June – The 2014 British National Road Race Championships held in Abergavenny, is won by Laura Trott (women) and Peter Kennaugh (men).

==== Football ====
- 2 January – Ole Gunnar Solskjær becomes manager of Cardiff City F.C.
- 4 January – Swansea City FC defeat Manchester United at Old Trafford for the first time in their history.
- 16 April – Gareth Bale scores the winning goal for Real Madrid in the 2014 Copa del Rey Final.
- 22 April – Ryan Giggs is appointed temporary manager of Manchester United after the sacking of David Moyes.
- 3 May
  - Cardiff City are relegated from the Premier League after a single season.
  - The New Saints complete the Welsh double by beating Aberystwyth Town to win the 2013–14 Welsh Cup.
- 19 May – Ryan Giggs announces his retirement from playing professional football.

==== Golf ====
- 21 September – Joost Luiten of the Netherlands wins the 2014 Wales Open.

==== Horse racing ====
- 27 December – The Welsh Grand National at Chepstow Racecourse is won by Emperor's Choice, trained by Venetia Williams and ridden by Aidan Coleman.

==== Snooker ====
- 2 March – Ronnie O'Sullivan beats Ding Junhui to win the 2014 Welsh Open.

== Broadcasting ==
=== English-language television ===
- Hinterland (English-language version of S4C's Y Gwyll)
- Coming Home (series 9)

=== Welsh-language television ===
- 35 Diwrnod
- Dim Byd
- Fferm Ffactor
- Cysgod Rhyfel

== Deaths ==
- 5 January – Ray Williams, Wales rugby union international, 86
- 28 January – Nigel Jenkins, poet, 64
- 4 February – Keith Bradshaw, Wales rugby union international, 74
- 8 February – Bernard Hedges, cricketer, 86
- 5 March – John Uzzell Edwards, painter, 79
- 24 March – Bryan Orritt, footballer, 77
- 30 March – Fred Stansfield, footballer and manager, 96
- 6 May – Leslie Thomas, novelist, 83
- 14 May – Anthony Christopher, politician, leader of Rhondda Cynon Taf County Borough Council (since 2012), 67 (leukaemia)
- 20 June – Handel Greville, Wales rugby union international, 92
- 23 June – Euros Lewis, cricketer, 72
- 2 July – Errie Ball, Welsh-born American golfer, oldest PGA member, last living player from inaugural Masters Tournament, 103
- 11 July – Danny Canning, footballer, 88
- 15 July – Gerallt Lloyd Owen, poet, 70
- 1 August – Rod de'Ath, musician, 64
- 9 September – Howell Evans, actor, 86
- 28 September – Dannie Abse, poet, 91
- 18 December – Mandy Rice-Davies, model, 70
- 21 December – Alan Williams, MP for Swansea West (1964–2010), Father of the House (2005–2010), 84

== See also ==
- 2014 in Northern Ireland
