= 2016 in Wales =

- Centuries: 19th; 20th; 21st
- Decades: 1990s; 2000s; 2010s; 2020s
- See also: List of years in Wales; Timeline of Welsh history 2016 in The United Kingdom England Scotland Elsewhere

This article is about the particular significance of the year 2016 to Wales and its people.

== Incumbents ==
- First Minister – Carwyn Jones
- Secretary of State for Wales – (to 19 March) Stephen Crabb; (from 19 March) Alun Cairns
- Archbishop of Wales – Barry Morgan, Bishop of Llandaff
- Archdruid of the National Eisteddfod of Wales – Christine James (outgoing); Geraint Llifon (incoming)

== Events ==
=== January ===
- 5 January – First Minister Carwyn Jones visits areas of Wales that have been badly affected by flooding, and promises that a further £2.3 million will be made available to be spent on flood protection.
- 18 January – Tata Steel announces 750 job losses at Port Talbot steelworks.

=== February ===
- 8 February – Wales is badly affected by Storm Imogen: 80 mph winds result in waves high enough to hit first-floor windows along Aberystwyth's seafront.
- 9 February – The Welsh Assembly votes for legislation to protect the historic environment and make the maintenance of records mandatory; this makes Wales the first part of the UK, and one of the first countries in the world, to legislate for the protection of historic environment records.
- 24 February – Aston Martin announces that their new DBX model will be built at a site in St Athan in the Vale of Glamorgan, creating 750 new jobs.

=== March ===
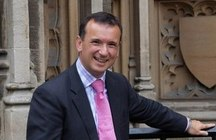
Alun Cairns is made Secretary of State for Wales in March.

- 9 March – Little Haven beach becomes the first in Britain to be declared smoke free.
- 16 March – In the 2016 Budget chancellor George Osborne announces the halving of tolls across both Severn Bridges from 2018.
- 17 March – The review of the Macur Report, a government inquiry into the abuse of children in care in the former county council areas of Gwynedd and Clwyd in North Wales is published. It finds "no evidence" of historical abuse by establishment figures.
- 19 March – Following the resignation of Iain Duncan Smith, Stephen Crabb is appointed as the new Secretary of State for Work and Pensions, while his position as Secretary of State for Wales is filled by Alun Cairns, MP for the Vale of Glamorgan.
- 30 March – Tata Steel announces that it is looking for a buyer for its entire British steel making operations, putting at risk all 5,500 jobs at Port Talbot Steelworks.

=== April ===
- 1 April – As part of a three-day celebration of arts, culture and creativity in Wales, artist Marc Rees unveils a 20 ft tall statue of singer Shirley Bassey on a balcony of Caernarfon Castle.
- 28 April – The skull and antlers of a deer dating back 4,000 years are found on a beach in Borth.
- 29 April – The Harvester, a fishing vessel operating from Milford Haven, carrying a father and son team, sinks off the coast of St David's.

=== May ===
- 5 May – 2016 National Assembly for Wales election. New constituency members elected include Hannah Blythyn (Labour), Siân Gwenllian (Plaid Cymru), Huw Irranca-Davies (Labour) and Lee Waters (Labour). New regional members include UKIP members Neil Hamilton and Mark Reckless. Plaid Cymru leader Leanne Wood takes the Rhondda seat from Labour's Leighton Andrews.
- 18 May
  - Labour leader Carwyn Jones is re-elected First Minister after his party forms a minority government with support from Plaid Cymru.
  - Neil Hamilton, leader of the UKIP contingent in the National Assembly for Wales, is widely criticised for using sexist language in his maiden speech.
- 26 May – The 29th Hay Festival opens, with Sir Tom Jones, Sir Karl Jenkins and director Sam Mendes named among the guest speakers.
- 31 May – Ifor ap Glyn begins his role as the National Poet of Wales taking over the post from Gillian Clarke who had held the position since 2008.

=== June ===
- 9 June – A call by MP Chris Bryant for the ban on speaking Welsh at Westminster to be overturned, is rejected by the House of Commons leader Chris Grayling.
- 23 June – In the 2016 United Kingdom European Union membership referendum, a 52.5% majority of voters in Wales vote to leave the EU, with 47.5% voting to remain.
- 30 June – An overnight vigil is conducted at Llandaff Cathedral to mark the centenary of the Battle of the Somme.

=== July ===
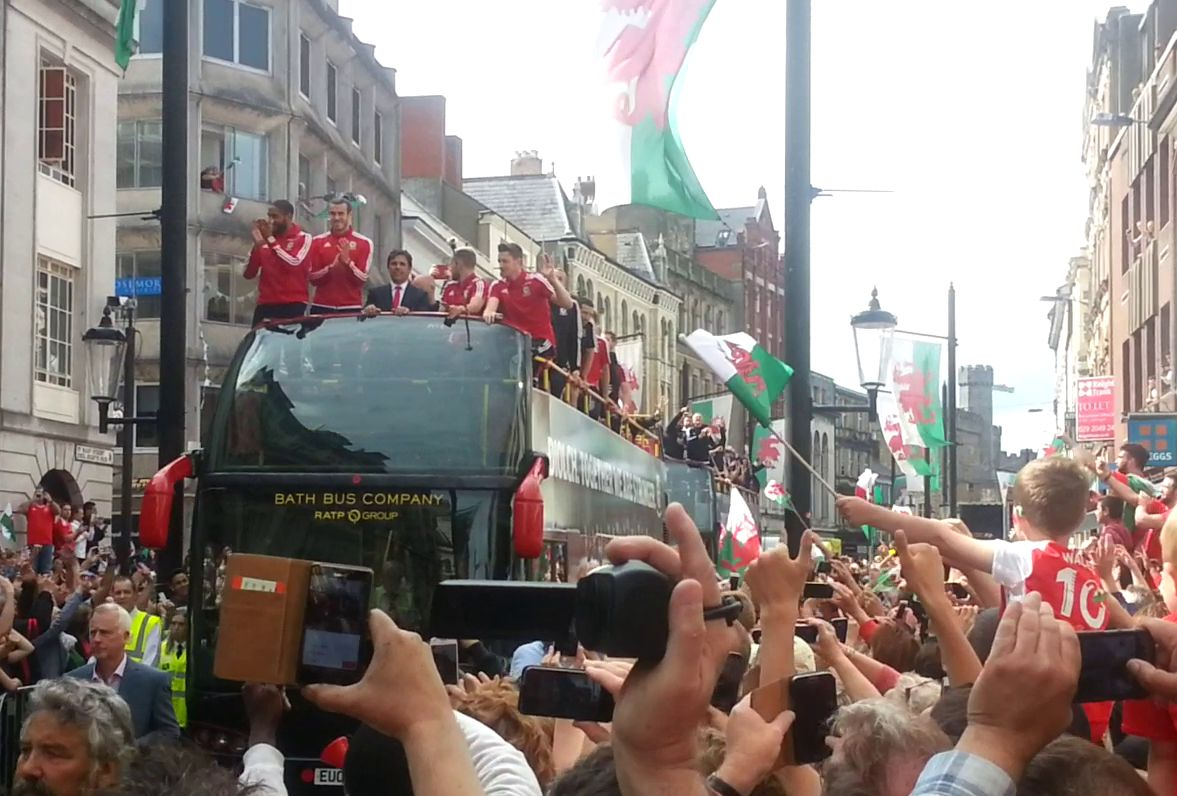
The Wales national football team are given a parade through Cardiff following their Euro 2016 success.

- 7 July – A service of commemoration is held at the Mametz Wood Memorial where members of the 38th (Welsh) Division were killed during the First Battle of the Somme 100 years ago. In attendance are the Archbishop of Wales Dr Barry Morgan and First Minister Carwyn Jones.
- 8 July – The Wales national football team return from France to a welcoming parade in Cardiff city centre. Celebrations include a concert by the Manic Street Preachers.
- 13 July – Owen Smith, MP for Pontypridd, announces that he will stand against Jeremy Corbyn for the position of Labour leader.
- 14 July – Following Theresa May's selection as the Prime Minister of the United Kingdom, Welsh Secretary Alun Cairns is one of only four ministers to retain their positions in the newly announced Cabinet.
- 20 July – Professor Sir John Meurig Thomas is awarded the Royal Medal "for his pioneering work within catalytic chemistry".
- 24 July – Communities in Wales and England celebrate the bicentenary of the opening of the Old Wye Bridge in Chepstow.

=== August ===
- 6 August – 130,000 visitors are recorded attending the 2016 National Eisteddfod in Abergavenny as the festival comes to a close. The iconic pink pavilion was replaced this year by a square-shaped white building in an attempt to improve acoustics.
- 28 August – The final BHS store in Wales, located in Swansea's Princess Way, closes its doors after the company goes into administration.

=== September ===
- 13 September
  - The Wales Bill 2016, which gives new powers and accountability for the Welsh Assembly, is passed by MPs in the House of Commons.
  - A new Boundary Commission plan which would see Welsh Members of Parliament cut from 40 to 29, is published for consultation.
- 17/18 September – A series of events celebrating the works of Roald Dahl are held throughout the streets of Cardiff on the centenary of the author's birth.
- 24 September – Jeremy Corbyn is re-elected as leader of the Labour Party following an unsuccessful challenge by Owen Smith.

=== October ===
- 8 October – Sir Karl Jenkins' Cantata Memoria, composed to mark the 50th anniversary of the Aberfan disaster, receives its premiere at the Wales Millennium Centre, with Sinfonia Cymru and a large choir conducted by the composer.
- 15 October – The Glynn Vivian Art Gallery re-opens after a £6 million renovation, which saw the building closed since 2011.
- 19 October – UK Prime Minister Theresa May and Opposition Leader Jeremy Corbyn support a call by Welsh MP Gerald Jones for a minute's silence throughout the UK to mark the 50th anniversary of the Aberfan disaster on 21 October.
- 21 October – Charles, Prince of Wales, visits Aberfan on the 50th anniversary of the disaster, but the planned minute's silence is largely ignored outside Wales.
- 26 October – The Independent Inquiry into Child Sexual Abuse opens an office in Wales, with the intent of allowing victims and survivors of abuse in Wales to share their experiences and seek justice.

=== November ===
- 2 November – Joanna Penberthy is elected to become the 129th Bishop of St Davids, succeeding Wyn Evans. The election makes her the first woman to become a bishop in Wales.

=== December ===
- 31 December – Wales football manager Chris Coleman is among the Welsh recipients of honours in the Queen's New Year Honours List, receiving the OBE. Singer Bryn Terfel receives a knighthood.

=== Undated ===
- Glyndŵr University, Wrexham, is renamed Wrexham Glyndŵr University.

== Arts and culture ==
=== Welsh Awards ===
- Glyndŵr Award
- National Eisteddfod of Wales: Chair – Aneirin Karadog, "Ffiniau"
- National Eisteddfod of Wales: Crown – Elinor Gwynn, "Llwybrau"
- National Eisteddfod of Wales: Prose Medal – Eurig Salisbury, "Cai"
- National Eisteddfod of Wales: Drama Medal – Hefin Robinson, Estron
- Gwobr Goffa Daniel Owen: Guto Dafydd, Ymbelydredd
- Wales Book of the Year:
  - English language: Thomas Morris, We Don't Know What We're Doing
  - Welsh language: Caryl Lewis, Y Bwthyn

=== New books ===
==== Welsh language ====
- Tony Bianchi – Sol a Lara
- Menna Elfyn – Optimist Absoliwt: Cofiant Eluned Phillips

=== Music ===
- Belle and Sebastian, James Blake and Laura Marling appear at the Green Man Festival.

==== Albums ====
- John Cale – M:FANS
- Aled Jones – One Voice
- Ren – Freckled Angels
- Gruff Rhys – Set Fire to the Stars

==== Compositions ====
- Iain Bell (music), David Antrobus and Emma Jenkins (libretto) – In Parenthesis (opera)

=== Film ===
- The Passing/Yr Ymadawiad, released 8 April 2016

== Sport ==
=== Awards ===
- BBC Cymru Wales Sports Personality of the Year – Jade Jones

=== In sports ===
- Association football
  - 20 March – Gareth Bale becomes the British leading goalscorer in La Liga history, with a tally of 43 goals, surpassing Gary Lineker's record.
  - 11 June – Wales begin their UEFA Euro 2016 campaign with a 2–1 win over Slovakia.
  - 6 July – Wales are beaten in the semi-finals of Euro 2016 by Portugal. The tournament is Wales' most successful campaign, in which two players, Joe Allen and Aaron Ramsey are named in UEFA's team of the tournament. Out of contract striker Hal Robson-Kanu's goal against Belgium in the quarter finals is named by UEFA as the second best goal of the championship.
  - 3 October – Swansea part company with manager Francesco Guidolin seven matches into the 2016–17 Premier League season.
- Athletics
  - 26 March – Kenya's Geoffrey Kamworor wins the Cardiff half-marathon despite slipping and falling at the start of the race.
- Boxing
  - 9 April – Lee Selby successfully defends his IBF World Featherweight title, beating American Eric Hunter on unanimous points decision.
  - 14 May – At the Ice Arena Wales, Andrew Selby defeats Louis Norman to become British Flyweight champion. In winning, Selby became the fastest Welsh fighter to win a Lonsdale Belt, having claimed his division in just five professional fights.
  - 30 October – Scottish boxer Mike Towell dies following his fight with Carmarthen-based boxer Dale Evans.
- Cricket
  - 2 July – England beat Sri Lanka at Sophia Gardens in Cardiff to take an unassailable 3–0 lead in the One Day International series.
- Cycling
  - 24 July – Chris Froome wins the 2016 Tour de France. Welsh cyclists Geraint Thomas and Luke Rowe are part of the Team Sky riders that helped him to victory.
- Golf
  - 24 July – Becky Morgan finishes third in the 2016 Ladies Scottish Open.
- Horse racing
  - 9 January – The Welsh Grand National 2015 is run, having been postponed from 27 December because of continuous heavy rain affecting the Chepstow course. It is won by Mountainous, ridden by jockey Jamie Moore.
- Ice hockey
  - 12 March – The Ice Arena Wales opens in Cardiff, a 3088-seater arena that will be home to the Cardiff Devils.
- Rugby union
  - 8 February – Ireland and Wales draw 16–16 in their first match of the 2016 Six Nations Championship.
  - 19 March – Wales finish the 2016 Six Nations Championship in second place behind England.
  - 25 June – Wales lose their third and final Test against the All Blacks in a 3–0 whitewash during the 2016 Wales rugby union tour of New Zealand.
- Snooker
  - 21 February – Ronnie O'Sullivan beats Neil Robertson to win the Welsh Open. This was O'Sullivan's fourth Open win bringing him level with John Higgins as the tournament's most successful player.

=== 2016 Summer Olympics ===
- On the first day of Olympic competition:
  - Jasmine Joyce becomes the first Welsh rugby player to compete at a Summer Olympics, scoring as a substitute in Team GB's opening match in the women's Rugby sevens against hosts Brazil.
  - Cyclist Geraint Thomas falls on the steep descent towards the finish of the Men's Road Race while in the leading group. Despite injury, he remounts his cycle and finishes the race.
- On day two of the Games
  - Jazmin Carlin takes silver in the women's 400 metre freestyle.
- On day four of the Games:
  - Boxer Joe Cordina loses to Hurshid Tojibaev to go out of the competition.
  - Rower Victoria Thornley and her partner Katherine Grainger progress to the final of the women's double sculls.
- On day six of the Games
  - Victoria Thornley and Katherine Grainger win silver in the women's double sculls.
  - James Davies and Sam Cross win silver as part of the Great Britain men's Rugby sevens team.

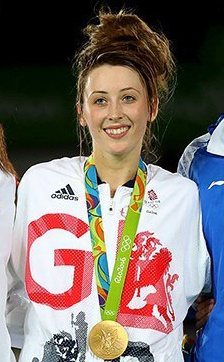
Jade Jones

- On day seven of the Games
  - Owain Doull wins a gold medal as part of the men's team pursuit, along with teammates Steven Burke, Ed Clancy and Bradley Wiggins.
  - Jazmin Carlin wins her second silver of the Games finishing behind the United States' Katie Ledecky in the women's 800 metre freestyle.
- On day eight of the Games
  - Elinor Barker wins a gold medal as part of the women's team pursuit, along with teammates Katie Archibald, Joanna Rowsell and Laura Trott.
  - In the women's keirin, Becky James finishes second to claim a silver medal.
- On day eleven of the Games
  - Becky James wins a second silver medal in the velodrome, in the women's sprint.
- On day thirteen of the Games
  - Jade Jones retains her 57 kg taekwondo title to become the first Welsh athlete to win an individual gold medal at the 2016 Games.
- On day fourteen of the Games
  - Helen Jenkins and Non Stanford compete in the women's triathlon, with Stanford finishing in fourth place.

=== 2016 Summer Paralympic Games ===
- On the third day of the Games
  - Sabrina Fortune throws a personal best of 12.94 to win bronze in the F20 shot put.
- On the fifth day of the Games
  - Aled Davies breaks the Paralympic record to win gold in the Men's shot put F42.
- On the sixth day of the Games
  - Rob Davies takes gold in the men's table tennis individual – class 2 category.
  - Hollie Arnold breaks her own world record twice on her way to winning the women's javelin F36.
- On the seventh day of the Games
  - Aaron Moores wins gold in the Men's 100 m breaststroke SB14.

== Broadcasting ==
=== English-language television ===
- The Green Hollow, a "film poem" by Owen Sheers

=== Welsh-language television ===
- Byw Celwydd
- ‘Run Sbit

== Deaths ==
- 4 January – John Roberts, footballer, 69
- 5 January – Albert Gubay, businessman and philanthropist, founded Kwik Save, 87
- 8 January – Ida Gaskin, Welsh-born New Zealand teacher and quiz show contestant, 96
- 18 January – Terence Cook, dual-code international rugby player, 88
- 21 January – Gerald Williams, journalist and tennis commentator, 86
- 23 January – Grahame Hodgson, rugby union international, 79
- 8 February – John Disley, steeplechase runner, Olympic bronze medallist (1952) and co-founder of the London Marathon, 87
- 9 February – Graham Moore, footballer, 74
- 16 February – Jim Pleass, Cricketer (Glamorgan), 92
- 4 March – John Brooks, Baron Brooks of Tremorfa, politician and boxing executive, President of the British Boxing Board of Control and Welsh Sports Hall of Fame, 88
- 19 March – David Green, cricketer, 76
- 10 April – Howard Marks, cannabis smuggler, writer and legalisation campaigner, 70 (cancer)
- 13 April
  - Gareth Thomas, actor (Blake's 7), 71 (heart failure)
  - Gwyn Thomas, poet and academic, National Poet (2006–2008), 79
- 9 May – Gareth Gwenlan, television producer, 79
- 20 July – Jim Pressdee, cricketer, 83
- 21 July – J. O. Roberts, actor, 84
- 31 July – Gwynn ap Gwilym, author, 61
- 1 August – Dai Dower, British flyweight boxing champion, 83
- 24 September – Mel Charles, Wales international footballer and brother of John Charles, 81
- 3 October – Andrew Vicari, painter, 84
- 8 October – Mervyn Jones, footballer, 85 (death announced on this date)
- 11 October – Peter Reynolds, composer, 58
- 18 October
  - Dave Colclough, poker player, 52 (cancer)
  - Huw Jones, Anglican bishop, 82
- 19 October – Gary Sprake, Welsh international footballer, 71
- 27 October – David Nash, rugby union player and national coach, 77
- 16 November – Len Allchurch, Welsh international footballer, 83
- 1 December – Barry Lloyd, cricketer (Glamorgan), 63
- 8 December
  - Gareth Griffiths, rugby union player, 85
  - Fred Secombe, clergyman and writer, 97
- 14 December – Bernard Fox, Welsh-born American actor, 89
- 21 December – Deddie Davies, actress, 78
- 22 December – John Gwilliam, Welsh international rugby union player, 93 (death announced on this date)

== See also ==
- 2016 in Northern Ireland
