= Hanan Issa =

Welsh–Iraqi poet, film-maker, scriptwriter and artist (born 1986/87)

National Poet of Wales
- Incumbent
- Assumed office July 2022
- Preceded by: Ifor ap Glyn

Personal details
- Born: 1986 or 1987 (age 39–40)
- Education: Cardiff University
- Occupation: Poet, filmmaker, scriptwriter, visual artist
- Website: hananissa.com

Hanan Issa (born 1986/1987) is a Welsh–Iraqi poet, film-maker, scriptwriter and artist. She was appointed National Poet of Wales in 2022, and the first Muslim to hold this title.

== Early life and education ==
Issa grew up in Cardiff, Wales, the eldest of six children. Her mother Karen is white Welsh and her father Ala is Muslim Iraqi. She grew up listening to her Welsh grandparents reciting poetry and absorbing folklore and storytelling from the cultural traditions of both sides of her family. She started to write poems from the age of six and later studied English Literature at Cardiff University.

In 2016, the then Prime Minister David Cameron made comments about Muslim women, which made her angry. Issa shared a poem she had written to express this anger with a friend, who encouraged her to share the poem on Facebook. She received such a positive response that it gave her the confidence to take her poetry into the public domain.

== Poetry ==
Her first solo publication was My Body Can House Two Hearts, a pamphlet of poetry published by Burning Eye Books in 2019. The pamphlet was one of three to win Burning Eye's debut pamphlet competition.

During her writing career, Issa has also worked a film-maker and scriptwriter. In 2017, her winning monologue 'With Her Back Straight' was performed at the Bush Theatre as part of the Hijabi Monologues project. In 2020, Issa was the recipient of a Ffilm Cymru/BBC Wales commission, which resulted in her writing and directing the short film The Golden Apple (2022). She worked on the Channel 4 comedy series We Are Lady Parts, working alongside the show's creator Nida Manzoor.

Alongside Darren Chetty, Grug Muse and Iestyn Tyne, Issa acted as a contributing editor to the essay anthology Welsh (Plural): Essays on the Future of Wales, published by Repeater Books in 2022. with Issa noting that "connections between one loyalty and another flow as easily for me as one body of water running into another." Issa also co-edited (with Durre Shahwar and Özgür Uyanık) the essay anthology Just So You Know: Essays of Experience, published by Parthian Books in 2020.

== National Poet of Wales ==
In July 2022, Issa was appointed as the National Poet of Wales, succeeding Ifor ap Glyn. The announcement was made on 6 July on BBC Radio 4's Front Row, with presenter Samira Ahmed interviewing Issa following the announcement. Following an extensive selection process, Issa was appointed for a period of three years, with her tenure set to run until 2025. She became the first Muslim poet to hold the title. Hanan performed at the Hay Festival's After Hours event at Cabaret in the Wales Millennium Centre, Cardiff in 2024, discussing the importance of acknowledging heritage and cultures.

A poetry reading by Issa at the 2026 official opening of the Senedd was cancelled on the basis her specially written poem, To Grow, was "not the right fit". The poem mentioned Gaza and healthcare for trans people. After a re-write the poem was rejected again. Issa commented that when "a poem that raises political issues is not welcome, that feels quite concerning".

== Publications ==
=== Poetry ===
- My Body Can House Two Hearts (2019)

=== As editor ===
- Just So You Know: Essays of Experience (2020)
- Welsh (Plural): Essays on the Future of Wales (2022)

== Awards ==
She was awarded an Honorary Doctorate by Bangor University in 2025 for contribution to Welsh culture, language, music, and the arts.
