= Cerys Hafana =

Welsh musician

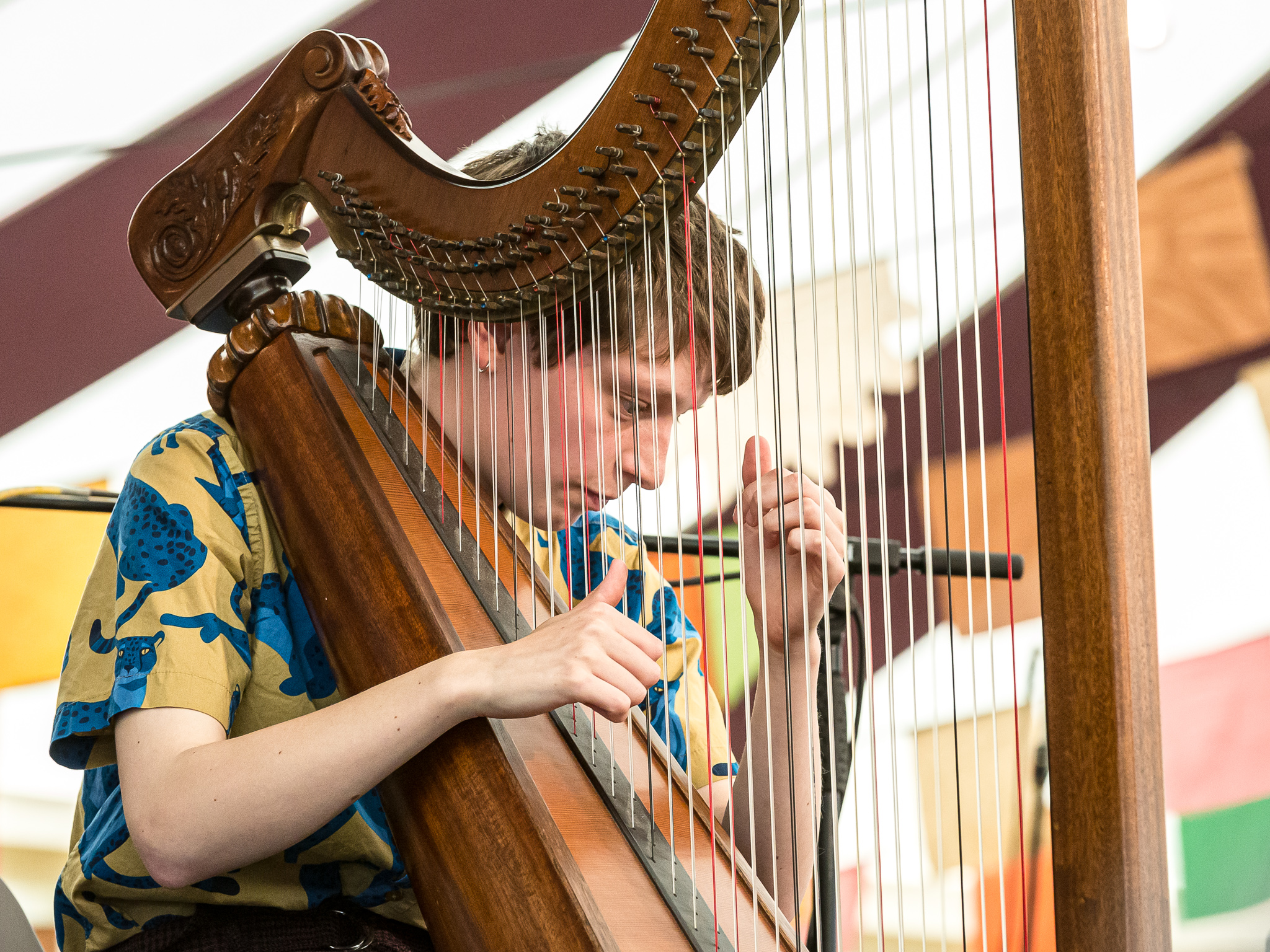
- Hafana at WOMAD in 2024

Background information
- Born: Cerys Havana Hickman
- Origin: Machynlleth, Powys, UK
- Genres: Contemporary folk
- Instruments: Triple harp, piano
- Years active: Since 2019
- Website: ceryshafana.com

Cerys Havana Hickman, known professionally as Cerys Hafana, is a multi-instrumentalist and composer from Machynlleth, Wales.

They are a member of AVANC (Ensemble Gwerin Ieuenctid Cymru (English: The Youth Folk Ensemble of Wales)).

In 2022, they released the album Edyf, based on songs found in the National Library of Wales. The album was shortlisted for the 2022‍–‍2023 Welsh Music Prize and the Welsh-language album of the year. The Guardian named it one of the top ten folk albums of 2022.

They contributed an essay to the 2022 anthology Welsh (Plural). The essay was met with controversy.

== Musical style and reception ==
Hafana describes their harp music as "sad Welsh harp pop" and has produced merchandise featuring this phrase.

Hafana summarized a method they use to source works to adapt during a performance at Showcase Scotland in 2023 [links added]:

I spend a lot of time on the Welsh National Library's online ballads database, like any cool person with lots of friends. And I like going looking for, sort of old folk-songs and ballads and poems, that have pretty much died out, and aren't really sung today. The next [song] I'm gonna do is one of those; it was written by a guy called "Benjamin" in 1858, and it describes his experience of watching Comet Donati – which was the second brightest comet of the 19th-century, for those of you who didn't know – and it's like a 7-page epic about this comet; I've cut it down a bit.

Paul Carr and Robert Smith of the University of South Wales have described Hafana as "one of the most original voices in contemporary Welsh folk music." Jude Rogers of The Guardian has described them as "a master of the Welsh triple harp" who "explores resonances from the past that connect with the modern day."

== Personal life ==
Hafana describes themself as queer, not fitting into the gender binary, and uses they/them pronouns. (Note: Hafana has been using 'they/them' pronouns in their self published website biography since c.14 October 2024.)

== Discography ==
All releases below have been available through Bandcamp.

=== Studio albums ===
- Cwmwl (2020)
- Edyf (2022)
- Difrisg (2025); piano compositions
- Angel (2025)

=== Studio EPs ===
- The Bitter (2024)
- Crwydro (2024)

=== Singles ===
- "The Wife of Usher's Well" (2023)
- "Child Owlet" (2024)
- "Tra Bo Dau" (2025)

== See also ==
- Duo Ruut – Estonian contemporary folk duo
