= Duo Ruut =

Estonian contemporary folk duo

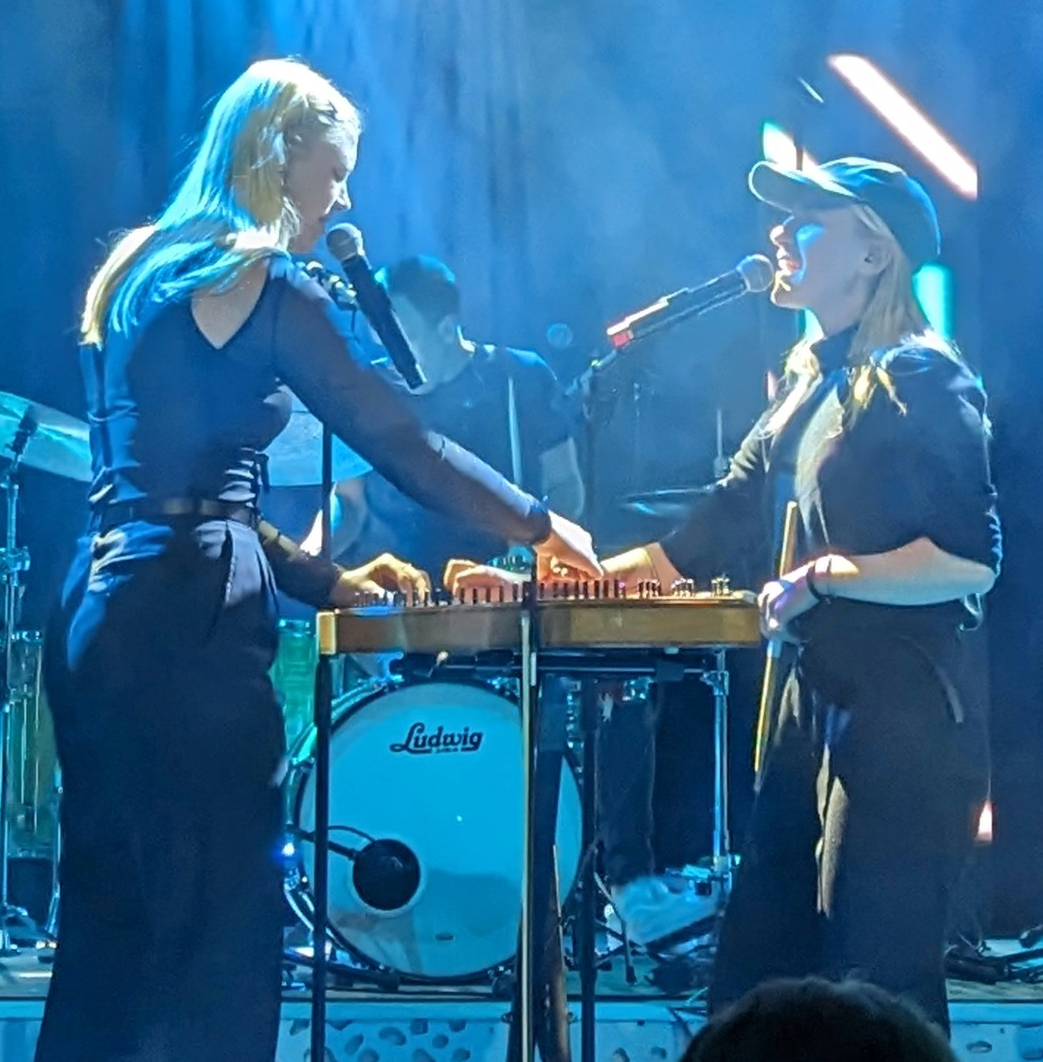
- Duo Ruut (Katariina Kivi front left; Ann-Lisett Rebane front right) in 2023, performing at an Estonian traditional music festival

Background information
- Origin: Estonia
- Genres: Folk
- Years active: Since 2015
- Members: Ann-Lisett Rebane; Katariina Kivi
- Website: www.duoruut.ee

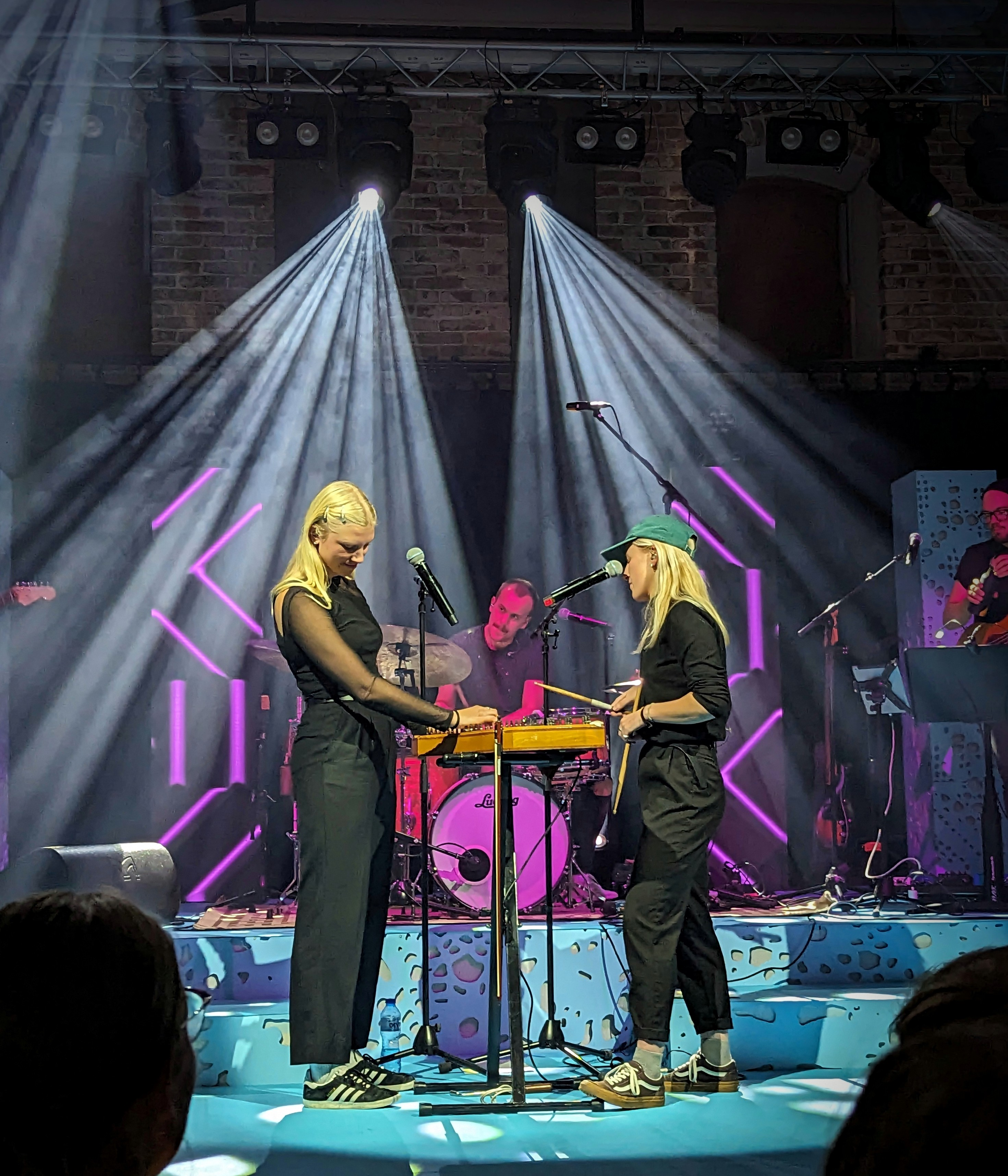
Duo Ruut performing with Jaan Jaago, Tõnu Tubli & Mati Tubli at Pärimusmuusika Lõikuspidu (an Estonian traditional music festival) in 2023

Duo Ruut (English: Duo Square) are an Estonian, contemporary-folk duo formed in 2015 by schoolmates and friends, musicians and songwriters, Ann-Lisett Rebane and Katariina Kivi. While contemporary, their songwriting is inspired by Estonian traditions amongst those of other cultures. They perform their songs by both simultaneously playing a single kannel (an Estonian zither) between them, plucked as traditionally intended, bowed, and also as a percussive instrument, all while singing.

Rebane and Kivi began making music together in the fifth-grade of school, and entered a joint folk project into competition, Noortebänd (English lit.: Youth Band). They both studied composition at school, and have cited Scandinavian and Nordic role-models. Kivi, who also plays the cello and bagpipes, enjoys and is influence by the Danish String Quartet, and also has an interest in Estonian traditional musician Maarja Nuut. Rebane also plays the piano and drums.

The duo was officially formed in 2015 when Rebane and Kivi were on a backpacking trip together, discussing that they wanted a simple name, and discarding one option, Mull ja Pilv (English: Bubble and Cloud). They settled on Ruut (English: Square) because they liked the sound of it. This initially caused some confusion with another Estonian band named Rüüt (English lit.: Robe), but after the word duo was prepended to their name by someone at a folk music band competition, their solution was to adopt it.

== Discography ==
=== Studio albums ===
- Tuule sõnad (English: Words of the Wind) (2021)
- Ilmateade (English: Weather Report) (2025)

=== Extended plays ===
- Kulla kerguseks (English lit.: For the Lightness of Gold) (2019)

=== Singles ===
- "Liisa pehmes süles" (English lit.: "In Liisa's Soft Embrace") (2022)
- "Udu" (English: "Fog") (2025)
- "Kuuse koht" (English: "The Spruce") (2025)
- "Enne ööd" (English: "Nightfall") (2025); featuring EiK

== See also ==
- Buke and Gase – American musical duo
- Bulgarian State Television Female Vocal Choir – Ensemble arranging Bulgarian folk melodies
- Cerys Hafana – Welsh musician
