= Welsh (Plural) =

2022 anthology about Wales

Welsh (Plural): Essays on the Future of Wales
- Editors: Darren Chetty, Hanan Issa, Grug Muse, and Iestyn Tyne
- Language: English
- Genre: Non-fiction
- Publisher: Repeater
- Publication date: March 8, 2022
- Pages: 256
- ISBN: 978-1913462888

Welsh (Plural): Essays on the Future of Wales is a 2022 Welsh non-fiction book. Edited by Darren Chetty, Hanan Issa, Grug Muse, and Iestyn Tyne, the book gathers an anthology of essays about Welsh identity and its future.

== Summary ==
The book contains 19 essays from various Welsh writers, including Hanan Issa, Joe Dunthorne, Mike Parker, Niall Griffiths, Marvin Thompson, Morgan Owen, Iestyn Tyne and Cerys Hafana. In an interview with the BBC, Issa stated that book originated in part from "frustrations of how narrow the perception of Welshness is" while Chetty stated in an interview with The Bookseller that "the three Cs of castles, coal and choirs are all important to thinking about present-day Welshness, but they are far from the whole story."

== Reception ==
Jude Rogers of The Guardian wrote that the essays in the book "stress that Wales is no utopia" and that "reading these voices under the label of Welshness is an energising experience, nevertheless, reminding us of how far the country has come and, also, how far it has to go." Emma Schofield of the Wales Arts Review wrote that the essays "are thoughtful and reflective, but made personal by the honesty of the stories told by the contributors" and that the book "does not dismiss the decades of discussion about Welsh identity which preceded it, but throws down a challenge to anyone still clinging to the idea that outdated notions of identity can still applied to contemporary Wales." Jon Gower of Nation.Cymru described the anthology as "eminently readable and energetic" with "some exceedingly powerful pieces of writing." Kirill Kobrin of Tribune said that the essays "bear witness about Welsh identity of their authors, about their involvement in this identity, about their attitude to it and—of course!—about how they struggle to construct it" and that "these evidences of the experience of belonging to the entity called Wales are priceless."
