= Gwyneth Lewis =

Inaugural National Poet of Wales

Gwyneth Lewis MBE
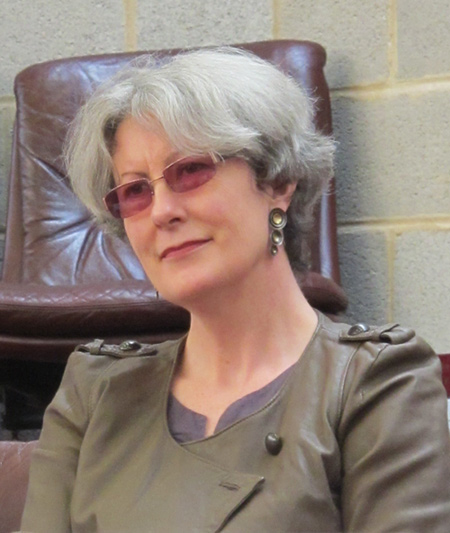

National Poet of Wales
- In office 2005–2006
- Preceded by: Inaugural holder
- Succeeded by: Gwyn Thomas

Personal details
- Born: 1959 (age 66–67)
- Occupation: Writer
- Website: gwynethlewis.com

Gwyneth Denver Davies MBE, FLSW (born 1959), known professionally as Gwyneth Lewis, is a Welsh poet, who was the inaugural National Poet of Wales in 2005. She, along with Menna Elfyn and Grahame Davies, wrote the text that appears over the Wales Millennium Centre.

== Biography ==
Gwyneth Lewis was born into a Welsh-speaking family in Cardiff. Her father started teaching her English when her mother went into hospital to give birth to her sister. Her mother was abusive.

Lewis attended Ysgol Gyfun Rhydfelen, a bilingual school near Pontypridd, and then studied at Girton College, Cambridge, where she was a member of Cymdeithas Y Mabinogi. She was awarded a double first in English literature and the Laurie Hart Prize for outstanding intellectual work. Lewis then studied creative writing at Columbia and Harvard, before receiving a D.Phil. in English from Balliol College, Oxford, for a thesis on 18th-century literary forgery featuring the work of Iolo Morganwg.

Lewis was made a Harkness Fellow and worked as a freelance journalist in New York for three years. She then returned to Cardiff as a documentary producer and director at BBC Wales. She left the BBC in 2001 after receiving a £75,000 grant from the National Endowment for Science, Technology and the Arts to carry out research and sail to ports linked historically with the inhabitants of her native Cardiff.

She was elected a Fellow of the Royal Society of Literature in 1999.

Lewis later wrote the words which appear over the Wales Millennium Centre, which opened in November 2004. The same words form the title of Karl Jenkins's cantata In These Stones Horizons Sing, which is partly set to lyrics by Gwyneth Lewis. In 2005 she was elected Honorary Fellow of Cardiff University. The same year she was made the first National Poet of Wales.

Lewis was a judge for the 2011 Hippocrates Prize for Poetry and Medicine. On 6 August 2012, Gwyneth Lewis won Y Goron (the Crown) at the National Eisteddfod at Llandow for a collection of poems on the set title of Ynys (Island).

In 2013, Lewis was elected as a Fellow of the Learned Society of Wales.

Lewis was appointed Member of the Order of the British Empire (MBE) in the 2022 Birthday Honours for services to literature. She returned to Balliol College to serve as Artist in Residence in 2023 and again in 2024.

=== Music ===
Lewis entered the world of music in partnership with Richard Chew. Redflight/ Barcud was her first libretto, commissioned and presented by Welsh National Opera with pupils from Ysgol Capel y Cynfab, Cynghordy and Ysgol Cil-y-cwm. The Most Beautiful Man from the Sea is an oratorio for 600 voices, with music by Chew and Orlando Gough. It was given its world première at the Wales Millennium Centre by the Chorus of Welsh National Opera and 500 amateur singers.

=== Personal life ===
Married to Leighton, a former boatswain with the Merchant Navy, Lewis has had a well documented battle in the past with clinical depression and alcoholism. Her personal battles inspired her first book, Sunbathing in the Rain: A Cheerful Book on Depression and also a collection of poems, Keeping Mum – Voices from Therapy.

Having agreed to change their lifestyles for their own good, Lewis and her husband bought the small yacht Jameeleh, taught themselves to sail, and set out to cross the Ocean to Africa. The journey inspired her 2005 book Two in a Boat – The True Story of a Marital Rite of Passage.

== Bibliography ==
- Llwybrau bywyd – Urdd Gobaith Cymru, 1977
- Ar y groesffordd – Urdd Gobaith Cymru, 1978
- Sonedau Redsa a Cherddi Eraill – Gomer, 1990
- Parables and Faxes – Bloodaxe, 1995
- Cyfrif Un Ac Un yn Dri – Barddas, 1996
- Zero Gravity – Bloodaxe, 1998. Inspired by an astronaut cousin's voyage to repair the Hubble Space Telescope. The BBC later based a documentary on the poetry.
- Y Llofrudd Iaith – Barddas, 2000: won the Welsh Arts Council Book of the Year Prize.
- Sunbathing in the Rain: A Cheerful Book on Depression – Flamingo, 2002
- Keeping Mum (republished in 2005 as Chaotic Angels) – Bloodaxe, 2003
- Two In A Boat: A Marital Voyage – Fourth Estate, 2005. Recounts a voyage with her husband on a small boat from Cardiff to North Africa, during which her husband was diagnosed with cancer.
- A Hospital Odyssey – Bloodaxe, 2010
- The Meat Tree – Seren, 2010
- Sparrow Tree – Bloodaxe, 2011
- Y Storm, 2012. Lewis's translation of Shakespeare's The Tempest)
- The Book of Taliesin (translation and introductions with Rowan Williams; Penguin, 2019)
- Nightshade Mother: A Disentangling, a memoir – Calon, 2024

== Prizes and awards ==
Current list of prizes and awards:

- 1977 – Literary Medal at the Urdd Gobaith Cymru
- 1978 – Literary Medal at the Urdd Gobaith Cymru
- 1988 – Eric Gregory Award
- 1995 – Aldeburgh Poetry Festival Prize Parables and Faxes
- 1995 – Forward Poetry Prize (Best First Collection) (shortlist) Parables and Faxes
- 1998 – Forward Poetry Prize (Best Poetry Collection of the Year) (shortlist) Zero Gravity
- 2000 – Arts Council of Wales Book of the Year Award Y Llofrudd Iaith
- 2001 – National Endowment for Science, Technology and the Arts (NESTA) Award
