= The Witch of Eye (novel) =

- First edition (publ. Accent Press)
- Author: Mari Griffith
- Language: English
- Publication date: 2016

The Witch of Eye is a 2016 historical novel written by Welsh singer and presenter Mari Griffith. It serves as a sequel to Griffith's 2014 novel, Root of the Tudor Rose.

== Plot ==
The story focuses on three women in 15th century England: Eleanor Cobham, the Duchess of Gloucester and aunt-by-marriage to the young Henry VI of England: Margery Jourdemayne (the titular Witch), a prospering Westminster farmer's wife: and Jenna, a dairymaid who escaped an abusive marriage in Devon to assist Margery as a seller of herbal remedies, and ends up forming an unrequited relationship with Margery's husband.

Eleanor visits Margery hoping she can enable her to conceive a son by her husband Humphrey, Duke of Gloucester to succeed him as an heir to the throne in place of the adolescent and unmarried Henry. Despite having recently dodged accusations of witchcraft, Margery is an ambitious woman, and she agrees to use dubious substances to grant the Duchess' wish: and Jenna has to help with her work. However, Eleanor has a dangerous rival in court in the form of the cardinal Henry Beaufort. And in a society where women are demonised as witches or whores, it doesn't take long before accusations start spreading that the women are planning to kill the king...

== Award ==
This book was awarded the Welsh Books Council's "Book of the Month".
