= Billy Davies (cricketer, born 1936) =

Welsh cricketer (1936–2022)

William George Davies
Personal information
- Full name: William George Davies
- Born: 3 July 1936; Barry, Glamorgan, Wales
- Died: 17 July 2022 (aged 86); Llandough, Penarth, Wales
- Batting: Right-handed
- Bowling: Right-arm medium fast
- Role: Batsman

Domestic team information
- Years: Team
- 1954-1960: Glamorgan

Career statistics
Competition	First-class
Matches	32
Runs scored	674
Batting average	11.62
100s/50s	0/2
Top score	64
Catches/stumpings	14
- Source: Cricinfo, 02 December 2025

William George Davies (3 July 1936 – 17 July 2022) was a Welsh cricketer born in Barry, Glamorgan, who played for Glamorgan from 1954 to 1960. He appeared in 32 first-class matches as a right-handed batsman who bowled right-arm medium fast. He scored 674 runs with a highest score of 64 and took 16 wickets with a best performance of two for 23.

Though primarily a batter, he took a wicket with his first ball in first-class cricket (in his fourth match for Glamorgan, at The Oval in May 1957); coming on as first change, he had Surrey's Tom Clark caught in the gully by Jim Pressdee.

== Death ==
Davies died in Llandough, Penarth on 17 July 2022, at the age of 86.
