= John Bryan Evans =

Welsh film and television producer

John Evans
- Born: John Bryan Casey; 5 May 1980 (age 46); Wrexham, Wales, UK
- Education: Bangor University
- Occupations: Film director, TV producer, Screenwriter, Film producer
- Spouse: (m.2007-????)
- Children: 3
- Military career
- Allegiance: United Kingdom
- Branch: British Army
- Service years: 1996–2005 British Army, 2007-Present British Army Reserve
- Unit: Royal Engineers
- Conflicts: Operation Banner War in Afghanistan (2001–present) Iraq War

John Evans (born John Bryan Casey on 5 May 1980) is a Welsh film and television director, producer, writer and illustrator. He also works as an artist using the name JB Evans. He is a former soldier. He works in the medium of both English and Welsh and produces both factual and fiction productions.

== Early and Pre-career Life ==
Born in Wrexham, North Wales on 5 May 1980, Evans grew up in Bangor, Gwynedd. He went to local schools Ysgol Cae Top and Ysgol Friars. His headmaster at Ysgol Cae Top was John McBryde, father of former Wales international rugby union player Robin McBryde. In 1996 Evans joined the British Army, serving as a Royal Engineer and saw service in Northern Ireland, Bosnia, Kosovo, Afghanistan and Iraq After leaving the armed forces Evans attended Bangor University and studied Film. He was awarded a First Class BA(Hons) and later received a Distinction in a Film making MA.

=== Career ===
Although his undergraduate degree was predominately academic, Evans began making short films while studying at University. He won the 2012 Welsh Royal Television Society Best Fiction award for his graduation film Long I Stood There. His short Welsh Language film NOT was also recognised by the RTS. His step-daughter Ceri and daughter Annabel played the two young children in the film about domestic abuse, which made an allegorical reference to the Welsh Not, with the former winning a number of Best Actress awards. In 2013 he made the documentary Curtains which featured on BBC Three Fresh. It focused on a Women's Aid refuge, the staff and women that had escaped domestic abuse. Evans grew up watching his mother abused by his father. After the break-up of his parents he and his siblings took their mother's surname.

For a BBC interview about the film he stated "I grew up having to watch my mum beaten and bullied by my abusive father. The film as a result became a very personal journey. With Curtains, I think I became as much as a participant as the women and support workers. With some reflexive reverting, perhaps I provided the child's point of view, the only view I have." Evans placed the dedication "For my mum" at the end of the film. In 2014 his short drama Jam Man was nominated at the Celtic Media Festival for Best Short Drama. Evans and the film where then nominated by the Royal Television Society for Best Drama. The Welsh language drama was first broadcast on Sky Arts. He then went on to produce and direct Cysgod Rhyfel (The Shadow of War) which was broadcast on S4C. The film focused on soldiers with Posttraumatic stress disorder and used the talking head accounts of war veterans who had served in Northern Ireland, the Falklands War, Bosnia, Kosovo, Afghanistan and Iraq, along with highly stylised dramatic sequences written by Evans. During the film Maldwyn Jones, a Falklands veteran contributing to the film discussed the suicide of L/Sgt Dan Collins, who had struggled with PTSD after serving in Afghanistan. The film showed the video message Dan left his mother Deana who had contributed to the film. During an interview with Jason Mohammad about the film Evans stated 'The sad thing is, all too often something happens and it goes too far. Dan couldn't cope any more and felt he needed to take his own life. These almost cataclysmic events will raise the subject, but it's just really sad that something like that had to happen first'. Evans went on to make a documentary film for S4C in Afghanistan with former Royal Marine officer and Conspicuous Gallantry Cross recipient Owen Davis.

After this Evans went on to direct on the S4C series Ward Plant and the BBC One series Flint Des Res. His diverse range continued when Evans began directing episodes of the CBS crime drama Elementary, while going on to create the children S4C series Antur Natur Cyw.

Evans is also the writer and illustrated of the Catrin & Abi book series.

=== Personal life ===
Evans lives on Anglesey with his family. He has three children Annabel, Jack and Scarlet. He also has a stepdaughter, Ceri. Despite working and having written in the Welsh language, he does not consider himself a fluent Welsh speaker.

== Books as writer and illustrator ==
Title	ISBN	Notes
My very special dog	ISBN 978-1-7392961-0-0	Catrin & Abi series
Ready to race	ISBN 978-1-7392961-1-7	Catrin & Abi series
The mystery of the missing shoe	ISBN 978-1-7392961-8-6	Catrin & Abi series
I need paint	ISBN 978-1-7392961-5-5	Catrin & Abi series
So many people know me	ISBN 978-1-7392961-7-9	Catrin & Abi series
There is a dinosaur in the garden	ISBN 978-1-7392961-9-3	Catrin & Abi series
Pirates of the Menai Straits	ISBN 978-1-7392961-4-8	Catrin & Abi series
My best friends’s birthday	ISBN 978-1-7392961-3-1	Catrin & Abi series
Moving to the zoo	ISBN 978-1-7392961-6-2	Catrin & Abi series
Trip to the moon	ISBN 978-1-7392961-2-4	Catrin & Abi series
Fy Nghi Arbennig Iawn	ISBN 978-1-7395201-0-6	Cyfres Catrin ac Abi
Barod i rasio	ISBN 978-1-7395201-1-3	Cyfres Catrin ac Abi
Dirgelwch yr esgid goll	ISBN 978-1-7395201-2-0	Cyfres Catrin ac Abi
Dwi angen paent	ISBN 978-1-7395201-3-7	Cyfres Catrin ac Abi
Mae cymaint o bobl yn fy nabod i	ISBN 978-1-7395201-4-4	Cyfres Catrin ac Abi
Mae deinosor yn yr ardd	ISBN 978-1-7395201-5-1	Cyfres Catrin ac Abi
Môr-ladron Y Fenai	ISBN 978-1-7395201-6-8	Cyfres Catrin ac Abi
Penblwydd fy ffrindiau gorau	ISBN 978-1-7395201-7-5	Cyfres Catrin ac Abi
Symud ir sŵ	ISBN 978-1-7395201-8-2	Cyfres Catrin ac Abi
Taith ir Lleuad	ISBN 978-1-7395201-9-9	Cyfres Catrin ac Abi

== Filmography ==
Year	Title	Role			Description	Broadcast	Notes
Year	Title	Director	Writer	Producer	Description	Broadcast	Notes
2011	When Saturday Comes	Yes		Yes	Short Documentary Film		
2012	Luck	Yes		Yes	Short Documentary Film		
2012	NOT	Yes	Yes	Yes	Short Film		Nominated Best Fiction Royal Television Society Wales
2012	Long I Stood There	Yes	Yes	Yes	Short Film		Winner Best Fiction Royal Television Society Wales
2013	Curtains	Yes		Yes	Short Documentary Film	BBC Three	
2013	Amomynus	Yes		Yes	Short Documentary Film		
2014	Cysgod Ryfel (The Shadow of War)	Yes	Yes Dramatic Sequences	Yes	Documentary Film	S4C	
2014	Gohebwyr: Owen Davis- Yn ol i Afganistan (Owen Davis-Back to Afghanistan)	Yes			Documentary Film	S4C	BAFTA Cymru Nominated
2015	Jam Man	Yes	Yes	Yes	Drama	Sky Arts	Nominated Best Short Drama Celtic Media Festival Nominated Best Drama Royal Television Society Wales
2015	Flint Des Res	Yes			Documentary Series	BBC One	Two part series
2015–Present	Ward Plant	Yes			Documentary series	S4C	
2015–Present	Elementary	Yes			Drama series	CBS	
2015-2017	Ysbyty Cyw Bach	Yes	Yes	Yes	Series	S4C	UNESCO Prix Jeunesse Nominated
2017	Antur natur Cyw	Yes	Yes	Yes	Series	S4C	Creator of Series
