= Rough Cut (TV series) =

Welsh television series

Rough Cut (Welsh: Dal y Mellt: translates as "Catch the Lightning") is a Welsh language contemporary thriller series.

== About ==
Dal y Mellt is a six-part series made by Vox Pictures and originally shown on S4C.

The series is based on the contemporary thriller novel written by Iwan ‘Iwcs’ Roberts, from Trawsfynydd and is set in Meirionydd, Cardiff and Soho in London. The novelist Iwan Roberts also wrote the script and co-produced the drama alongside Llŷr Morus and Huw Chiswell.

The series director, Huw Chiswell says that filming was a challenge where 6 hours had to be finished in 50 days.

A second series of the show would return to S4C in 2024.

== Netflix ==
Abacus Media Rights sold the crime drama to Netflix which is set to be the first Welsh language-only drama licensed on Netflix, streaming in the UK from April 2023.

Benjamin King of Netflix said that has said that the content that is made in Wales and about Wales "travels extremely well" to worldwide audiences.

CEO of S4C, Sian Doyle said that "To sell a Welsh-language-only series to a major global streamer like Netflix sets out our ambition to take Welsh talent and language to the world and creates further exciting opportunities for S4C."

Netflix says they could play a role in helping to "promote and preserve the Welsh language". COBA executive Adam Minns said that "We've gone from a situation where there was literally one show being made in Wales 15 years ago to Cardiff being one of the biggest production centres in the UK at the moment."

The director of the series said that subtitles are becoming "second nature" in TV and film which could lead the way for other minority language productions.

A policy advocate for the Welsh Tourism Alliance says that the series could be beneficial to the tourism industry in Wales.

The series was renamed for its Netflix streaming as Rough Cut.

== Cast ==
- Carbo played by Gwïon Morris Jones
- Mici Ffin played by Mark Lewis Jones
- Gronw played by Dyfan Roberts
- Antonia played by Lois Meleri-Jones
- Les played by Graham Land
- Dafydd Aldo played by Owen Arwyn
- Cidw played by Ali Yassine
- Julia played by Siwan Morris
- Terrence played by Jordan Bernarde

== See also ==
- List of Welsh television series
