= Calennig =

Welsh New Year's tradition

Calennig ([kaˈlɛnɪɡ]) is a Welsh word meaning "New Year celebration/gift", although it literally translates to "the first day of the month", deriving from the Latin word kalends. The English word "calendar" also has its root in this word.

It is a tradition where children carry a decorated apple, pierced with three sticks and decorated with a sprig of box and hazelnuts on New Year's Day. Children would sing a verse and were often gifted with money or food.

== Gift giving ==
The tradition of giving gifts and money on New Year's Day is an ancient custom that survives even in modern-day Wales, though nowadays it is customary to give bread and cheese.

Many people give gifts on New Year's morning, with children having skewered apples stuck with raisins and fruit. In some parts of Wales, people must visit all their relatives by midday to collect their Calennig, and celebrations and traditions can vary from area to area. In Stations of the Sun, Ronald Hutton gives the following example of Calennig rhyme from 1950s Aberystwyth,

Dydd calan yw hi heddiw,
Rwy'n dyfod ar eich traws
I 'mofyn am y geiniog,
Neu grwst, a bara a chaws.
O dewch i'r drws yn siriol
Heb newid dim o'ch gwedd;
Cyn daw dydd calan eto
Bydd llawer yn y bedd.
("Today is the start of the new year, and I have come to you to ask for coins, or a crust, and bread and cheese. O come to the door cheerfully without changing your appearance; Before the next arrival of the new year many will be in their graves.")

Ronald Hutton also notes that in the South East Wales and in the Forest of Dean area, the skewered apple itself was known as the Calennig, and in its most elaborate form consisted of "an apple or orange, resting on three sticks like a tripod, smeared with flour, stuck with nuts, oats or wheat, topped with thyme or another fragrant herb and held by a skewer."

Similarly, Fred Hando in his 1944 book The Pleasant Land of Gwent, reproduces an illustration of a Calennig seen at Devauden and quotes his friend Arthur Machen:

When I was a boy in Caerleon-on-Usk, the town children got the biggest and bravest and gayest apple they could find in the loft, deep in the dry bracken. They put bits of gold leaf upon it. They stuck raisins into it. They inserted into the apple little sprigs of box, and they delicately slit the ends of hazel-nuts, and so worked that the nuts appeared to grow from the ends of the holly leaves ... At last, three bits of stick were fixed into the base of the apple tripod-wise; and so it borne round from house to house; and the children got cakes and sweets, and-those were wild days, remember-small cups of ale.

Back in the 1880's, my mother, who came from Tregarth, Bangor, taught us this song, the words which were as follows:

Calennig, Calennig, Bore Dydd Calan,
Dyma'r amser i rannu'r arian,
Blwyddyn newydd dda i chi,
Ac i bawb sydd yn y ty,
Dyma yw ein dymuniad ni,
Ar ddechrau'r flwyddyn hon,
O dyma ni yn ddod,
I ganu'r flwyddyn hon,
I chi a phawb sydd yn y ty
Ar ddechrau'r flwyddyn hon.

We used to sing this song from door to door, hoping to be rewarded with some money from our efforts.

Machen traces the Calennig to the Roman Saturnalia and suggests that the custom was brought to Caerleon by the Romans.
