= Y Goleudy =

Welsh-language television sci-fi drama

Y Goleudy ("The Lighthouse") is an S4C Welsh language sci-fi drama series.

== About ==
The series is a sci-fi drama made up of six episodes of 30 minutes each. The series is aimed at children aged 10 years of age, and set in a seaside surfing village in west Wales. Efa moves with her grandfather to the quiet village of Brynarfor and investigates the local lighthouse.

== Production ==
In May 2021 it was announced that UK Young Audiences Content Fund would provide funding for the series to be produced by Boom Cymru for S4C. The fund is funded by the UK government and is managed by the British Film Institute.

The sci-fi drama series is aimed at older children and was moved into production for the summer of 2022 after being postponed during the covid pandemic.

The series was first aired on 19 December 2022.

== See also ==
- List of Welsh television series
