= Euros Lewis =

Welsh cricketer

Personal information
- Full name: Euros John Lewis
- Born: 31 January 1942; Llanelli, Carmarthenshire, Wales
- Died: 23 June 2014 (aged 72); Llanelli
- Batting: Left-handed
- Bowling: Right-arm off break

Domestic team information
- Years: Team
- 1967–1969: Sussex
- 1966: Marylebone Cricket Club
- 1961–1966: Glamorgan

Career statistics
Competition	First-class	List A
Matches	182	12
Runs scored	3,487	153
Batting average	14.06	23.40
100s/50s	–/11	–/1
Top score	80	78
Balls bowled	20,035	–
Wickets	341	–
Bowling average	27.23	–
5 wickets in innings	13	–
10 wickets in match	2	–
Best bowling	8/89	–
Catches/stumpings	131/–	1/–
- Source: Cricinfo, 18 March 2012

Euros John Lewis (31 January 1942 – 23 June 2014) was a Welsh cricketer. Lewis was a left-handed batsman who bowled right-arm off break. He was born at Llanelli, Carmarthenshire.

== Glamorgan ==
Lewis made his first-class debut for Glamorgan against Somerset at Clarence Park, Weston-super-Mare, in the 1961 County Championship. Early in his career, Lewis played as a hard-hitting opening batsman, before concentrating on his off break bowling, and dropping down the batting order. In his first season, Lewis appeared seven times in first-class cricket for Glamorgan, scoring 450 runs at an average of 34.61, with three half centuries and a high score of 73 not out. By his second season, he had established himself as a semi-regular in the Glamorgan side, playing twelve first-class matches in 1962, though he struggled with the bat in this season, opening the batting early in the season and later in the middle order, scoring 256 runs at a low average of 11.63, with a single half century. This dip in his batting performance also coincided with an increase in his bowling workload, with 15 wickets in 1962, at a bowling average of 30.80. He took his maiden five wicket haul in this season, taking 5/97 against Cambridge University.

In 1963 List A cricket was introduced to English domestic cricket, with Lewis playing in Glamorgan's first match in that format against Worcestershire in the Gillette Cup at The Gnoll, Neath. Despite Glamorgan losing this match, Lewis became the first Glamorgan player to score a one-day half century, making 78.

== Sussex ==
Lewis left Glamorgan after the 1966 season and played for Sussex from 1967 to 1969. He took 85 wickets in 1967, but his form declined, and he retired from first-class cricket at the end of the 1969 season.

== Later life ==
He continued to play club cricket for Dafen Welfare for some years thereafter. He died after a short illness on 23 June 2014.
