= Cysgod Rhyfel =

- English Version of Original Poster
- Written by: John Evans
- Directed by: John Bryan Evans
- Starring: Maldwyn Jones; Roy Rees; Ryan Roberts; Richard Jones
- Country of origin: United Kingdom
- Original languages: Welsh; English

Production
- Producers: John Evans; Gwen Griffith
- Cinematography: Rhys Edwards
- Editor: Llŷr Madog
- Production company: Cwmni Da

Original release
- Network: S4C
- Release: 18 May 2014

Cysgod Rhyfel, also known as The Shadow of War, is a 2014 documentary film which explores the mental effects of conflict on former soldiers and their families. Predominantly in Welsh, the film was first broadcast on S4C on 18 May 2014. It was directed and produced by John Evans.

Commenting in an interview about the film Evans highlighted his motives for making the documentary when he said "I feel a sense of responsibility and an obligation to highlight the issues surrounding the experience of war and mental health issues faced by veterans…it's vital their stories are heard to help address the time bomb of men and women traumatized by war".

The film specifically addresses PTSD. Ifor ap Glyn was the film's executive producer.

== Synopsis ==
After active service in Northern Ireland, the Falklands, Iraq and Afghanistan four veterans openly discuss their experiences of conflict and the psychological effects of war on their lives beyond the battlefield and how they live life after their wars and once they return home. The film uses a mixture of talking head testimony, archive and highly stylised dramatic sequences.

=== People featured in the film ===
==== Interviewed ====
- Maldwyn Jones, former Welsh Guard who saw service in Northern Ireland and the Falklands War. He survived the air assault on the Sir Galahad in 1982.
- Roy Rees, former Royal Corps of Transport soldier who served in Northern Ireland.
- Ryan Roberts, former Royal Army Medical Corps medic who served in Afghanistan and Iraq.
- Richard Jones, former Welsh Guard who served in Afghanistan.
- William Watkins, a veterans' therapist.
- Liza Roberts, Ryan's wife.

==== In photographs and sourced video ====
The film uses the personal photographs of the veterans who were interviewed as well as the last video message recorded by Welsh Guard L/Sgt Dan Collins. Collins had struggled with PTSD after serving in Afghanistan. He took his own life after leaving a video message to his mother Deana Collins.

==== Re-enactors ====
- Iago McGuire
- Jack Evans
- Youssef Alkaddour
- Seth Williams
