= Alan Rees (rugby) =

Welsh rugby union and rugby league footballer (1938–2022)

- Rees in 1964

Personal information
- Full name: Alan Henry Morgan Rees
- Born: 17 February 1938 Neath, Glamorgan, Wales
- Died: 17 March 2022 (aged 84) Morriston, Swansea, Wales

Playing information

Rugby union
- Position: Fly-half
Club
| Years | Team | Pld | T | G | FG | P |
|---|---|---|---|---|---|---|
| | Maesteg RFC |
Representative
| Years | Team | Pld | T | G | FG | P |
| 1962 | Wales | 3 | 0 | 0 | 1 | 3 |

Rugby league
- Position: Wing, Centre
Club
| Years | Team | Pld | T | G | FG | P |
|---|---|---|---|---|---|---|
| 1962–65 | Leeds | 27 | 5 | 3 | 1 | 23 |
- Cricket career

Cricket information
- Batting: Right-handed
- Bowling: Right-arm medium-pace

Domestic team information
- Years: Team
- 1955–1971: Glamorgan

Career statistics
| Competition | First-class | List A |
|---|---|---|
| Matches | 216 | 17 |
| Runs scored | 7681 | 207 |
| Batting average | 24.07 | 14.78 |
| 100s/50s | 2/36 | 0/1 |
| Top score | 111 not out | 50 |
| Balls bowled | 561 | 6 |
| Wickets | 6 | 0 |
| Bowling average | 66.33 | – |
| 5 wickets in innings | 0 | – |
| 10 wickets in match | 0 | – |
| Best bowling | 3/68 | – |
| Catches/stumpings | 113/– | 5/– |
- Source: Cricinfo, 14 June 2014

Alan Henry Morgan Rees (17 February 1938 – 17 March 2022) was a Welsh rugby union and professional rugby league footballer who played in the 1960s. He played representative level rugby union (RU) for Wales, and at club level for Maesteg RFC, as a fly-half. He played club level rugby league (RL) for Leeds. He also played county cricket for Glamorgan from 1955 to 1971.

== Background ==
Alan Rees was born in Neath, Glamorgan, Wales.

== International honours ==
Alan Rees won three caps for Wales (RU) in 1962 against England, Scotland and France.

== Cricket career ==
Rees also played cricket for Glamorgan, making 216 first-class appearances between 1955 and 1968. A fine fielder, he appeared as a substitute in the Third Test Match against Australia at Headingley, taking the catch that dismissed Peter Burge off the bowling of Fred Trueman. This appearance makes him one of the few players to have played on both the rugby and cricket grounds at Headingley. In the match against Middlesex at Lord's in 1965, he became only the second player ever to be given out as "handled the ball" in the County Championship. In 1970 and 1971, he reappeared in Gillette Cup and John Player league matches.

== Later life ==
After his playing career ended, Rees worked as a sports development officer for Afan Borough Council. He died at Morriston Hospital in 2022, aged 84.
