= Huw O. Pritchard =

Welsh-born Canadian chemist (1928–2019)

Huw Owen Pritchard (23 July 1928 – 9 August 2019) was a Welsh-born Canadian chemist who was a Distinguished Research Professor Emeritus at York University.
