= Ifor ap Glyn =

Welsh television presenter and poet (born 1961)

National Poet of Wales
- In office March 2016 – August 2022
- Preceded by: Gillian Clarke
- Succeeded by: Hanan Issa

Personal details
- Born: 1961 (age 64–65) London, England
- Occupation: Writer

Ifor ap Glyn (born 1961) is a Welsh television presenter and Welsh-language poet. From 2016 to 2022 he served as National Poet of Wales.

== Early life and education ==
Ifor ap Glyn was born in London into a Welsh-speaking family, and graduated from Cardiff University. He relocated as an adult to Denbighshire and later to Caernarfon.

== Career ==
As a poet Ifor ap Glyn primarily writes in Welsh, though he has also composed poems in English. In 2018 he published Cuddle Call?, his first collection with English translation in a parallel text. In 1999 Ifor ap Glyn won the Crown at the National Eisteddfod of Wales (a feat he repeated in 2013), and in the same year performed at the celebratory concert that marked the opening of the Welsh National Assembly. In 2008, Ifor ap Glyn was appointed Bardd Plant Cymru (Children's Poet Laureate for Wales), holding the role for a year. He has twice represented Wales at the Smithsonian Folklife Festival in the USA.

Before becoming a poet and dramatist, Ifor ap Glyn worked as a television producer and scriptwriter, and has worked extensively with the theatre company Cwmni Dda. He also served as the executive producer of the documentary film Cysgod Rhyfel (The Shadow of War), a 2014 documentary film that explored the mental effects of conflict on former soldiers and their families.

On 1 March 2016, Ifor ap Glyn was appointed National Poet of Wales, succeeding Gillian Clarke. During his tenure, Ifor ap Glyn wrote in both Welsh and English, with his commissioned work including poems to mark the 20th anniversary of the Senedd, the centenary of the Armistice, Wales qualifying for the Euro 2016 football tournament, the 80th anniversary of Mynydd Epynt eviction, the reopening of the home of poet Hedd Wyn to the public, and the 2017 Champions League Final being held in Cardiff. He also composed poems for patients at Velindre Cancer Centre, to support DEC Cymru's Indonesia Tsunami appeal, and to welcome Syrian refugees to Wales. His time as National Poet of Wales lasted for six years, coming to an end in 2022. He was succeeded by Hanan Issa, who Ifor ap Glyn said was a poet that he admired and would "bring a fresh voice to the national conversation”.

== Books ==
- Ifor ap Glyn (1991). Holl Garthion Pen Cymro Ynghyd. Y Lolfa. ISBN 978-0-86243-238-6.
- Ifor ap Glyn (1998). Golchi Llestri Mewn Bar Mitzvah. Illustrated by Dewi Glyn Jones. Gwasg Carreg Gwalch. ISBN 978-0-86381-534-8.
- Ifor ap Glyn (2001). Cerddi Map yr Underground. Gwasg Carreg Gwalch. ISBN 978-0-86381-754-0.
- Ifor ap Glyn (2008). Lleisiau'r Rhyfel Mawr. Gwasg Carreg Gwalch. ISBN 978-1-84527-210-4.
- Ifor ap Glyn (2011). Waliau'n Canu. Gwasg Carreg Gwalch. ISBN 978-1-84527-340-8.
- Ifor ap Glyn (2016). Tra Bo Dau. Gwasg Carreg Gwalch. ISBN 978-1-84527-560-0.
- Ifor ap Glyn (2018). Hanes yr Iaith Mewn 50 Gair. Gwasg Carreg Gwalch. ISBN 978-1-84527-652-2.
- Ifor ap Glyn (2018). Cuddle Call?. Gwasg Carreg Gwalch. ISBN 978-1-84527-678-2.

== Plays ==
- Branwen
- Frongoch

== Television (as presenter) ==
- Ar Lafar (2011)
- The Toilet: An Unspoken History (2012)
- Pagans and Pilgrims: Britain's Holiest Places (2013)
