= Guto Dafydd =

Welsh poet and author

Guto Dafydd (born c.1990) is a Welsh poet and novelist, who writes in the Welsh language. He has twice won the Crown at the National Eisteddfod of Wales and is twice winner of the Daniel Owen Prize for a novel.

== Background ==
Guto Dafydd was born in Pwllheli and began winning prizes for both poetry and prose in local competitions while he was still a pupil at Ysgol Uwchradd Glan y Mor. In 2013, the year before his first National Eisteddfod win, he won the Urdd National Eisteddfod Crown under the pen name of Yelizaveta.

Guto Dafydd has a wife named Lisa and two children, Casi Mallt and Nedw Lludd. He works for the Welsh Language Commissioner. In 2015 he was diagnosed with fibromatosis, which resulted in his having to undergo radiotherapy; he used this experience in his novel, Ymbelydredd, which won the Daniel Owen Prize (Gwobr Goffa Daniel Owen) in the following year.

When he was awarded the crown at the 2014 National Eisteddfod, he became one of the youngest ever winners. His second win was in 2019, when he performed a double by also winning the Daniel Owen Prize for Carafanio.

== Works ==
=== Poetry ===
- Ni Bia’r Awyr (Cyhoeddiadau Barddas, 2014)

=== Novels ===
- Jac (Y Lolfa, 2014)
- Stad (Y Lolfa, 2015)
- Ymbelydredd (Y Lolfa, 2016)
- Carafanio (Y Lolfa, 2019)
