= National Poet of Wales =

Poet laureate of Wales

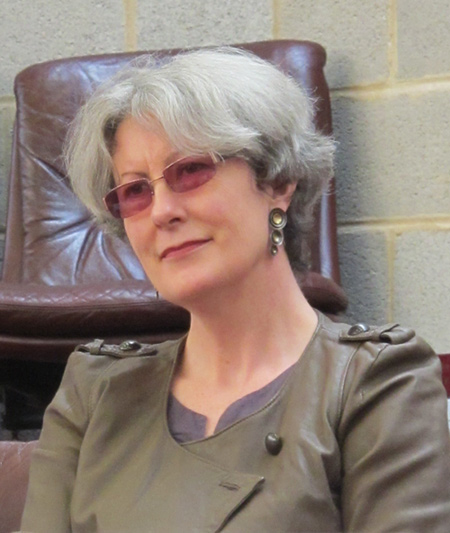
Gwyneth Lewis, the first National Poet of Wales (2005–2006)

The post of National Poet of Wales (Welsh: Bardd Cenedlaethol Cymru) was established in May 2005 by Academi, the Welsh National Literature Promotion Agency and Society for Writers, now known as Literature Wales. The current holder of the position is Hanan Issa, who was appointed for a period of three years in July 2022.

== Background ==
The National Poet of Wales acts as a cultural ambassador for the nation, creating works which promote the image of Wales; works are read at ceremonial and official occasions. The post alternates between poets who write in English, and poets who write mainly in Welsh, and is supported by the Arts Council of Wales’ Lottery fund.

Iestyn Davies, Head of Communications at the Arts Council of Wales, said: "As a country renowned for its literary heritage it is fitting that Wales should have its own national poet, creating new works that celebrate our successes, comment on our failures and raise the profile of Wales through literature."

For this project Peter Finch, the Academi’s Chief Executive, had run a long campaign of fund and awareness raising. He had involved all the major Welsh institutions with an interest in literature. These included the Welsh Assembly, the National Eisteddfod, the Welsh Books Council, The Welsh Arts Council, the Professor of Poetry at the University of South Wales, the National Writers Centre at Ty Newydd, and those writers’ unions still operating.

To date the role has been held by five writers. Initially the role was funded for a single-year tenure, with Gwyneth Lewis becoming the first National Poet in 2005. Gwyn Thomas would succeed Lewis in 2006, remaining as National Poet until 2008. Later the length of tenure expanded, with Gillian Clarke holding the role for 8 years between 2008 and 2016, and Ifor ap Glyn holding the role for 6 years between 2016 and 2022. The current holder is Hanan Issa, who was appointed for a period of three years in July 2022. In a change to the way the National Poet is appointed, the 2022 appointment process began with a public call for nominations before shortlisted poets were interviewed by a selection panel.

== List of office holders ==
| National Poet | Picture | Birth and Death | Dates of Tenure | Length of Tenure (Years) | Ref. |
|---|---|---|---|---|---|
| Gwyneth Lewis | | 1959– | 2005–2006 | 1 | |
| Gwyn Thomas | | 1936–2016 | 2006–2008 | 2 | |
| Gillian Clarke | | 1937– | 2008–2016 | 8 | |
| Ifor ap Glyn | | 1961– | 2016–2022 | 6 | |
| Hanan Issa | | 1986/87– | 2022–present | – | |

== See also ==
- Poet laureate
- Bardd Plant Cymru – Children's Welsh-language national poet
- Children's Laureate Wales – Wales children's national poet
- National poet
