= Neocolonialism =

Dominance of states through indirect means

Neocolonialism is the control by a state (usually, a former colonial power) over another nominally independent state (usually, a former colony) through indirect means. The term neocolonialism was first used after World War II to refer to the continuing dependence of former colonies on foreign countries, but its meaning soon broadened to apply, more generally, to places where it was argued the power of developed countries was used to produce a level of control in some ways comparable to direct colonialism. Some scholars have argued that neocolonialism operates through global economic governance, including international financial institutions and trade regimes, which can influence domestic policy decisions in formally sovereign states through mechanisms such as debt and loan conditionalities.

Neocolonialism is argued to take the form of economic imperialism, cultural imperialism and conditional aid to influence or control a developing country, instead of the previous colonial methods of direct military control or indirect political control (hegemony). Neocolonialism differs from standard globalisation and development aid in that it typically results in a relationship of dependence, subservience, or financial obligation towards the neocolonialist nation.

Coined by the French philosopher Jean-Paul Sartre in 1956, it was first used by Kwame Nkrumah in the context of African countries undergoing decolonisation in the 1960s. Neocolonialism is discussed in Sartre's works such as Colonialism and Neocolonialism and Noam Chomsky's The Washington Connection and Third World Fascism.

== Term ==
=== Origins ===
When first proposed, the term neocolonialism was applied to European countries' continued economic and cultural relationships with their former colonies, particularly those African countries that had been liberated in the aftermath of Second World War. At the 1962 National Union of Popular Forces conference, Mehdi Ben Barka, the Moroccan political organizer and later chair of the Tricontinental Conference 1966, used the term al-isti'mar al-jadid (Arabic: الاستعمار الجديد "the new colonialism") to describe the political trends in Africa in the early sixties.

الاستعمار الجديد عبارة عن سياسة تعمل من جهة على منح الاستقلال السياسي، وعند الاقتضاء إنشاء دول مصطنعة لا حظ لها في وجود ذاتي، ومن جهة أخرى، تعمل على تقديم مساعدات مصحوبة بوعود تحقيق رفاهية تكون قواعدها في الحقيقة خارج القارة الإفريقية.

"Neo-colonialism is a policy that functions on one hand through granting political independence and, when necessary, creating artificial states that have no chance of sovereignty, and on the other hand, through providing 'assistance' accompanied by promises of achieving prosperity, though its bases are in fact outside the African continent."

— Mehdi Ben Barka, The Revolutionary Option in Morocco (May 1963)

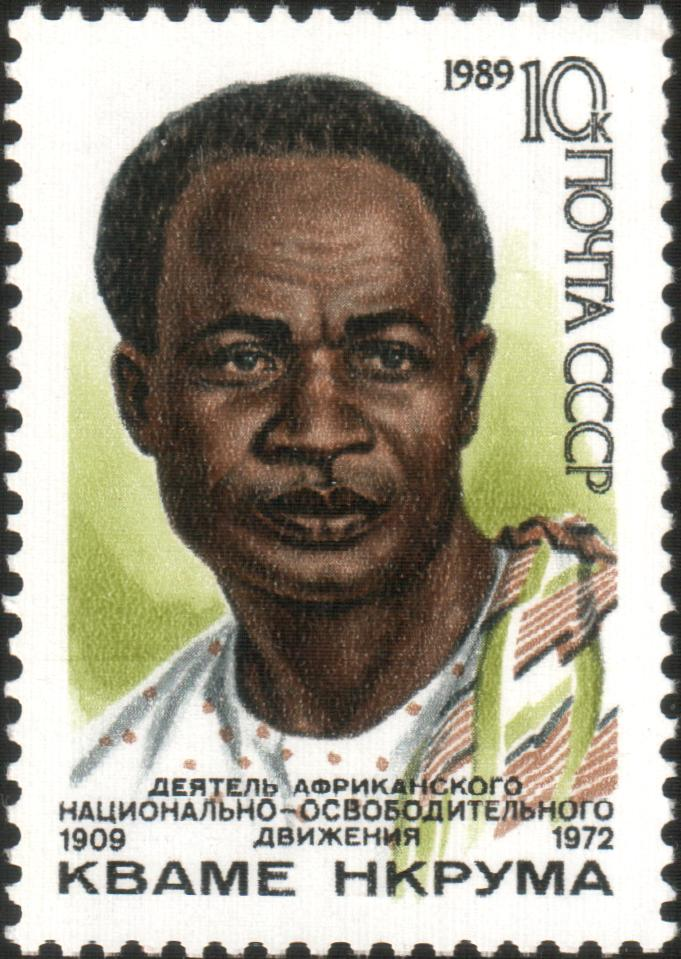
Kwame Nkrumah (pictured on a Soviet postage stamp), president of Ghana (1960–1966), coined the term "neocolonialism".

Kwame Nkrumah, president of Ghana from 1960 to 1966, is credited with coining the term, which appeared in the 1963 preamble of the Organisation of African Unity Charter, and was the title of his 1965 book, Neo-Colonialism, The Last Stage of Imperialism. In his book the President of Ghana exposes the workings of International monopoly capitalism in Africa. For him Neo-colonialism, insidious and complex, is even more dangerous than the old colonialism and shows how meaningless political freedom can be without economic independence. Nkrumah theoretically developed and extended to the post–World War II 20th century the socio-economic and political arguments presented by Lenin in the pamphlet Imperialism, the Highest Stage of Capitalism (1917). The pamphlet frames 19th-century imperialism as the logical extension of geopolitical power, to meet the financial investment needs of the political economy of capitalism.

In Neo-Colonialism, the Last Stage of Imperialism, Kwame Nkrumah wrote:

In place of colonialism, as the main instrument of imperialism, we have today neo-colonialism ... [which] like colonialism, is an attempt to export the social conflicts of the capitalist countries. ...

The result of neo-colonialism is that foreign capital is used for the exploitation of labour, rather than for the development of the less developed parts of the world. Investment, under neo-colonialism, increases, rather than decreases, the gap between the rich and the poor countries of the world. The struggle against neo-colonialism is not aimed at excluding the capital of the developed world from operating in less developed countries. It is also dubious in consideration of the name given being strongly related to the concept of colonialism itself. It is aimed at preventing the financial power of the developed countries being used in such a way as to impoverish the less developed.

The essence of neo-colonialism is that the State which is subject to it is, in theory, independent and has all the outward trappings of international sovereignty. In reality its economic system and thus its political policy is directed from outside.

== Contemporary usage ==
In contemporary scholarship, the term neocolonialism is often used to describe structural inequalities in the global political economy, particularly in relation to trade dependency, global supply chains, and financial governance. Critics argue that institutions such as the International Monetary Fund (IMF) and the World Bank can exert influence over domestic economic policies in developing countries through loan conditionalities, while others contend that such mechanisms are necessary for economic stability and development.

The reliance of smartphones on elements such as cobalt and rare-earth elements has been described as neocolonialism, as miners in least developed countries undergo child labour and other human rights abuses, while the profits go to richer countries (such as both the United States and China).

== Neocolonial economic dominance ==
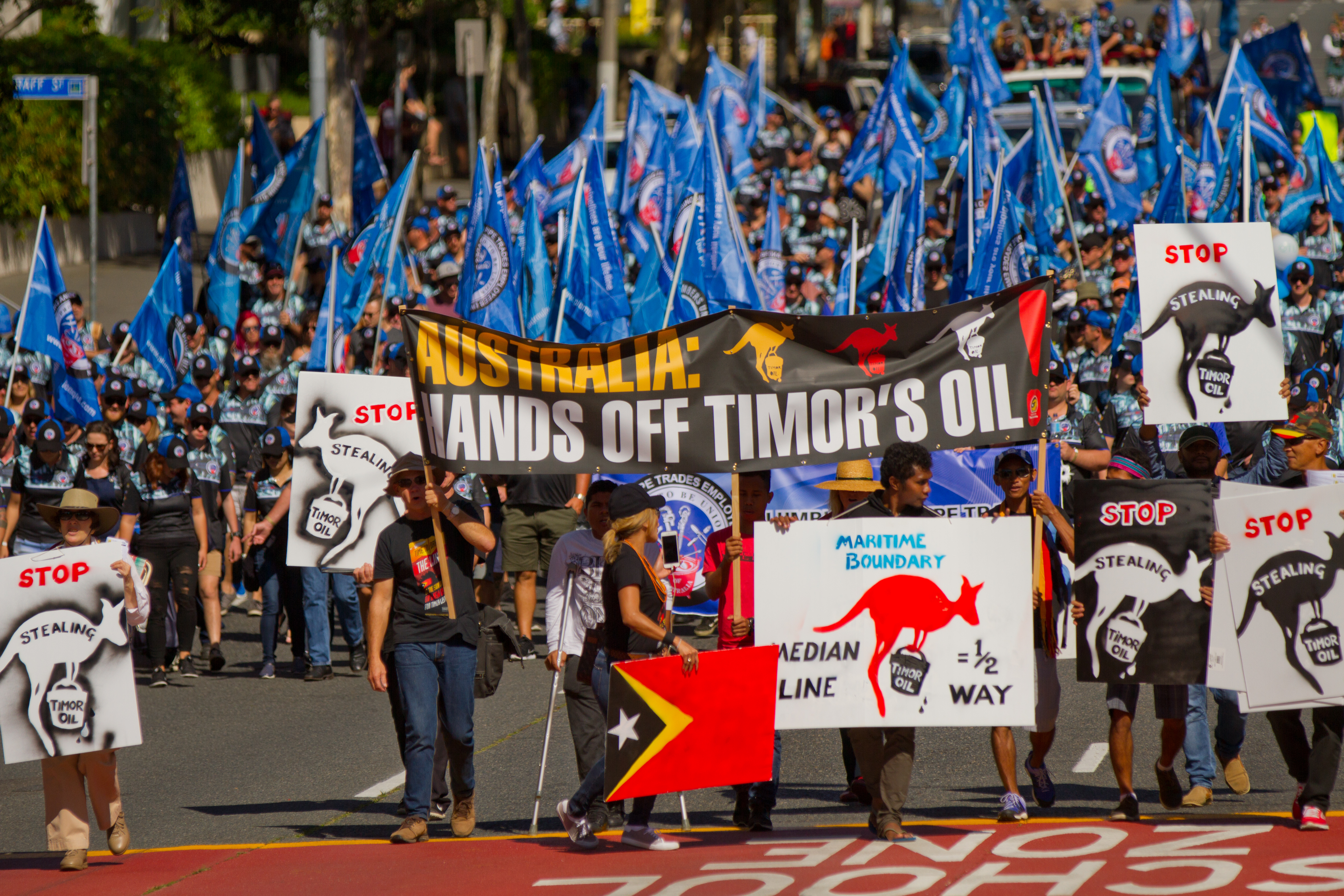
People in Brisbane protesting Australia's claim on East Timorese oil, in May 2017

In 1961, regarding the economic mechanism of neocolonial control, in the speech Cuba: Historical Exception or Vanguard in the Anti-colonial Struggle?, Argentine revolutionary Che Guevara said:

We, politely referred to as "underdeveloped", in truth, are colonial, semi-colonial or dependent countries. We are countries whose economies have been distorted by imperialism, which has abnormally developed those branches of industry or agriculture needed to complement its complex economy. "Underdevelopment", or distorted development, brings a dangerous specialisation in raw materials, inherent in which is the threat of hunger for all our peoples. We, the "underdeveloped", are also those with the single crop, the single product, the single market. A single product whose uncertain sale depends on a single market imposing and fixing conditions. That is the great formula for imperialist economic domination.

=== Dependency theory ===
Dependency theory is the theoretical description of economic neocolonialism. It proposes that the global economic system comprises wealthy countries at the centre, and poor countries at the periphery. Economic neocolonialism extracts the human and natural resources of a poor country to flow to the economies of the wealthy countries. It claims that the poverty of the peripheral countries is the result of how they are integrated in the global economic system. Dependency theory derives from the Marxist analysis of economic inequalities within the world's system of economies, thus, under-development of the periphery is a direct result of development in the centre. It includes the concept of the late 19th century semi-colony.

=== Cold War ===
During the mid-to-late 20th century, in the course of the ideological conflict between the U.S. and the U.S.S.R., each country and its satellite states accused each other of practising neocolonialism in their imperial and hegemonic pursuits. The struggle included proxy wars, fought by client states in the decolonised countries. Cuba, the Warsaw Pact bloc, Egypt under Gamal Abdel Nasser (1956–1970) et al. accused the U.S. of sponsoring anti-democratic governments whose regimes did not represent the interests of their people and of overtthrowing elected governments (African, Asian, Latin American) that did not support U.S. geopolitical interests.

In the 1960s, under the leadership of Chairman Mehdi Ben Barka, the Cuban Tricontinental Conference (Organisation of Solidarity with the People of Asia, Africa and Latin America) recognised and supported the validity of revolutionary anti-colonialism as a means for colonised peoples of the Third World to achieve self-determination, a policy which angered the U.S. and France. Moreover, Chairman Barka headed the Commission on Neocolonialism, which dealt with the work to resolve the neocolonial involvement of colonial powers in decolonised counties; and said that the U.S., as the leading capitalist country of the world, was, in practice, the principal neocolonialist political actor.

=== Multinational corporations ===
Critics of the practice of neocolonialism also argue that investment by multinational corporations enriches few in underdeveloped countries and causes humanitarian, environmental and ecological damage to their populations. They argue that this results in unsustainable development and perpetual underdevelopment. These countries remain reservoirs of cheap labor and raw materials, while restricting access to advanced production techniques to develop their own economies. In some countries, monopolization of natural resources, while initially leading to an influx of investment, is often followed by increases in unemployment, poverty and a decline in per-capita income.

In the West African nations of Guinea-Bissau, Senegal and Mauritania, fishing was historically central to the economy. Beginning in 1979, the European Union began negotiating contracts with governments for fishing off the coast of West Africa. Unsustainable commercial over-fishing by foreign fleets played a significant role in large-scale unemployment and migration of people across the region. This violates the United Nations Convention on the Law of the Sea, which recognises the importance of fishing to local communities and insists that government fishing agreements with foreign companies should target only surplus stocks.

Oxfam's 2024 report "Inequality, Inc" concludes that multinational corporations located in the Global North are "perpetuating a colonial style 'extractivist' model" across the Global South as the economies of the latter "are locked into exporting primary commodities, from copper to coffee" to these multinationals. Scholars have also linked these dynamics to global value chains, in which higher-value production processes are concentrated in developed countries while resource extraction and low-wage labor remain in developing economies.

=== International borrowing ===
American economist Jeffrey Sachs recommended that the entire African debt (c. US$200 billion) be dismissed, and recommended that African nations not repay either the World Bank or the International Monetary Fund (IMF):

The time has come to end this charade. The debts are unaffordable. If they won't cancel the debts, I would suggest obstruction; you do it, yourselves. Africa should say: "Thank you very much, but we need this money to meet the needs of children who are dying, right now, so, we will put the debt-servicing payments into urgent social investment in health, education, drinking water, the control of AIDS, and other needs".

=== Conservation and neocolonialism ===
Wallerstein, and separately Frank, claim that the modern conservation movement, as practiced by international organisations such as the World Wide Fund for Nature, inadvertently developed a neocolonial relationship with underdeveloped nations.

=== Science ===
Neo-colonial research or neo-colonial science, frequently described as helicopter research, parachute science or research, parasitic research, or safari study, is when researchers from wealthier countries go to a developing country, collect information, travel back to their country, analyze the data and samples, and publish the results with little or no involvement of local researchers. A 2003 study by the Hungarian Academy of Sciences found that 70% of articles in a random sample of publications about least-developed countries did not include a local research co-author.

Frequently, during this kind of research, the local colleagues might be used to provide logistics support as fixers but are not engaged for their expertise or given credit for their participation in the research. Scientific publications resulting from parachute science frequently only contribute to the career of the scientists from rich countries, thus limiting the development of local science capacity (such as funded research centers) and the careers of local scientists. This form of "colonial" science has reverberations of 19th century scientific practices of treating non-Western participants as "others" in order to advance colonialism—and critics call for the end of these extractivist practices in order to decolonize knowledge.

This kind of research approach reduces the quality of research because international researchers may not ask the right questions or draw connections to local issues. The result of this approach is that local communities are unable to leverage the research to their own advantage. Ultimately, especially for fields dealing with global issues like conservation biology which rely on local communities to implement solutions, neo-colonial science prevents institutionalization of the findings in local communities in order to address issues being studied by scientists.

== By area ==
=== Africa ===
==== Françafrique ====
Usage of (in 2009): West African CFA franc Central African CFA franc

The representative example of European neocolonialism is Françafrique, the "France-Africa" constituted by the continued close relationships between France and its former African colonies.

In 1955, the initial usage of the term "French Africa", by President Félix Houphouët-Boigny of Ivory Coast, denoted positive social, cultural and economic Franco–African relations. It was later applied by neocolonialism critics to describe an imbalanced international relation.

Neocolonialism was used to describe a type of foreign intervention in countries belonging to the Pan-Africanist movement, as well as the Asian–African Conference of Bandung (1955), which led to the Non-Aligned Movement (1961). Neocolonialism was formally defined by the All-African Peoples' Conference (AAPC) and published in the Resolution on Neo-colonialism. At both the Tunis conference (1960) and the Cairo conference (1961), AAPC described the actions of the French Community of independent states, organised by France, as neocolonial.

The politician Jacques Foccart, the principal adviser for African matters to French presidents Charles de Gaulle (1958–1969) and Georges Pompidou (1969–1974), was the principal proponent of Françafrique.

The works of Verschave and Beti reported a forty-year, post-independence relationship with France's former colonial peoples, which featured colonial garrisons in situ and monopolies by French multinational corporations, usually for the exploitation of mineral resources. It was argued that the African leaders with close ties to France—especially during the Soviet–American Cold War (1945–1992)—acted more as agents of French business and geopolitical interests than as the national leaders of sovereign states. Cited examples are Omar Bongo (Gabon), Félix Houphouët-Boigny (Ivory Coast), Gnassingbé Eyadéma (Togo), Denis Sassou-Nguesso (Republic of the Congo), Idriss Déby (Chad), and Hamani Diori (Niger).

The Defense Agreements between France and French-speaking African countries established close cooperation, particularly in defense and security matters. Often accompanied by secret clauses, they allowed France to intervene militarily: to rescue regimes in order to establish the legitimacy of political powers favorable to its interests, to fight jihadism, particularly in the Sahel, or to put an end to civil wars. The departure of French troops from the African continent signals the end of a world, that of interventions in Chad, Togo, Gabon, Rwanda, Djibouti, Zaire, Somalia, Ivory Coast, Mali, Libya, and Cameroon. It also marks the end of Françafrique.

==== Belgian Congo ====
Belgium's approach to Belgian Congo has been characterized as a quintessential example of neocolonialism, as the Belgians embraced rapid decolonization of the Congo with the expectation that the newly independent state would become dependent on Belgium. This dependence would allow the Belgians to exert control over Congo, even though Congo was formally independent.

After the decolonisation of Belgian Congo, Belgium continued to control, through the Société Générale de Belgique, an estimated 70% of the Congolese economy following the decolonisation process. The most contested part was in the province of Katanga where the Union Minière du Haut Katanga, part of the Société, controlled the mineral-resource-rich province. After a failed attempt to nationalise the mining industry in the 1960s, it was reopened to foreign investment.

==== Uganda ====
Ugandan activists trying to stop the East African Crude Oil Pipeline (EACOP) argue that it is "an example of typical neo-colonial extraction". EACOP is majority owned by the French multinational fossil fuel company TotalEnergies. The pipeline which as of 2025 is half finished is to export crude oil to the coast of the Indian Ocean, from where it will be shipped abroad for oil refining. As with other raw materials like cacao, most accumulation of economic value will occur abroad.

=== United States ===
There is an ongoing debate about whether certain actions by the United States should be considered neocolonialism. Nayna J. Jhaveri, writing in Antipode, views the 2003 invasion of Iraq as a form of "petroimperialism", believing that the U.S. was motivated to go to war to attain vital oil reserves, rather than to pursue the U.S. government's official rationale for the Iraq War.

Noam Chomsky has been a prominent critic of "American imperialism"; he believes that the basic principle of the foreign policy of the United States is the establishment of "open societies" that are economically and politically controlled by the United States and where U.S.-based businesses can prosper. He argues that the U.S. seeks to suppress any movements within these countries that are not compliant with U.S. interests and to ensure that U.S.-friendly governments are placed in power. He believes that official accounts of U.S. operations abroad have consistently whitewashed U.S. actions in order to present them as having benevolent motives in spreading democracy. Examples he regularly cites are the actions of the United States in Vietnam, the Philippines, Latin America, and the Middle East.

Chalmers Johnson argued in 2004 that America's version of the colony is the military base. Johnson wrote numerous books, including three examinations of the consequences of what he called the "American Empire". Chip Pitts argued similarly in 2006 that enduring United States bases in Iraq suggested a vision of "Iraq as a colony".

David Vine, author of Base Nation: How U.S. Military Bases Overseas Harm America and the World (2015), said the US had bases in 45 "less-than-democratic" countries and territories. He quotes political scientist Kent Calder: "The United States tends to support dictators [and other undemocratic regimes] in nations where it enjoys basing facilities".

=== China ===
The People's Republic of China has built increasingly strong ties with some African, Asian, European and Latin American nations which has led to accusations of colonialism, As of August 2007, an estimated 750,000 Chinese nationals were working or living for extended periods in Africa. In the 1980s and 90s, China continued to purchase natural resources—petroleum and minerals—from Africa to fuel the Chinese economy and to finance international business enterprises. In 2006, trade had increased to $50 billion expanding to $500 billion by 2016.

In Africa, China has loaned $95.5 billion to various countries between 2000 and 2015, the majority being spent on power generation and infrastructure. Cases in which this has ended with China acquiring foreign land have led to accusations of "debt-trap diplomacy". Other analysts say that China's activities "are goodwill for later investment opportunities or an effort to stockpile international support for contentious political issues".

In 2018, during a visit to Beijing, Malaysian Prime Minister Mahathir Mohamad cancelled two China-funded projects, while also talking about fears of Malaysia becoming "indebted" and of a "new version of colonialism". He later clarified that he did not refer to the Belt and Road Initiative or China with this.

According to Mark Langan in 2017, China, Western actors, and other emerging powers pursue their own interests at the expense of African interests. Western actors depict China as a threat to Africa, while depicting European and American involvement in Africa as being virtuous.

=== Russia ===
Russia currently occupies parts of neighboring states. These occupied territories are Transnistria (part of Moldova); Abkhazia and South Ossetia (part of Georgia); and five provinces of Ukraine, which it has illegally annexed. Russia has also established effective political domination over Belarus, through the Union State. Historian Timothy Snyder defines Russia's war against Ukraine as "a colonial war, in the sense that Russia meant to conquer, dominate, displace and exploit" the country and its people. Russia has been accused of colonialism in Crimea, which it annexed in 2014, by enforced Russification, passportization, and by settling Russian citizens on the peninsula and forcing out Ukrainians and Crimean Tatars.

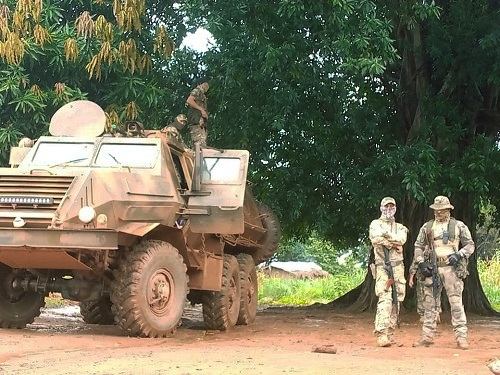
Russian mercenaries standing guard near an armored vehicle in the Central African Republic

The Wagner Group, a Russian state-funded private military company (PMC), has provided military support, security and protection for several autocratic regimes in Africa since 2017. In return, Russian and Wagner-linked companies have been given privileged access to those countries' natural resources, such as rights to gold and diamond mines, while the Russian military has been given access to strategic locations such as airbases and ports. This has been described as a neo-colonial and neo-imperialist kind of state capture, whereby Russia gains sway over countries by helping to keep the ruling regime in power and making them reliant on its protection, while generating economic and political benefits for Russia, without benefitting the local population. Russia has also gained geopolitical influence in Africa through election interference and spreading pro-Russian propaganda and anti-Western disinformation. Russian PMCs have been active in the Central African Republic, Sudan, Libya, Mali, Burkina Faso, Niger and Mozambique, among other countries. They have been accused of human rights abuses and killing civilians. In 2024, the Wagner Group in Africa was merged into a new 'Africa Corps' under the direct control of Russia's Ministry of Defense. Analysts for the Russian government have privately acknowledged the neo-colonial nature of Russia's policy towards Africa.

The "Russian world" is a term used by the Russian government and Russian nationalists for territories and communities with a historical, cultural, or spiritual tie to Russia. The Kremlin meanwhile refers to the Russian diaspora and Russian-speakers in other countries as "Russian compatriots". In her book Beyond Crimea: The New Russian Empire (2016), Agnia Grigas highlights how ideas like the "Russian world" and "Russian compatriots" have become an "instrument of Russian neo-imperial aims". The Kremlin has sought influence over its "compatriots" by offering them Russian citizenship and passports (passportization), and in some cases eventually calling for their military protection. Grigas writes that the Kremlin uses the existence of these "compatriots" to "gain influence over and challenge the sovereignty of foreign states and at times even take over territories".

=== Iran ===
The Iranian government has been called an example of neocolonialism. The motivation for Iran is not economic, but religious. After its establishment in 1979, Iran sought to export Shia Islam globally and position itself as a force in world political structures. Africa's Muslims present a unique opportunity in Iran's dominance in the Muslim world. Iran is able to use these African communities to circumvent economic sanctions and move arms, man power, and nuclear technology.

Iran exerts its influence through humanitarian initiatives, such as those seen in Ghana. Through the building of hospitals, schools, and agricultural projects Iran uses "soft power" to assert its influence in Western Africa.

=== Niue ===
The government of Niue has been trying to get back access to its domain name, .nu. The country signed a deal with a Massachusetts-based non-profit in 1999 that gave away rights to the domain name. Management of the domain name has since shifted to a Swedish organisation. The Niue government is currently fighting on two fronts to get back control on its domain name, including with the ICANN. Toke Talagi, the long-serving Premier of Niue who died in 2020, called it a form of neocolonialism.

=== South Korea ===
To ensure a reliable, long-term supply of food, the South Korean government and powerful Korean multinationals bought farming rights to millions of hectares of agricultural land in under-developed countries.

South Korea's RG Energy Resources Asset Management CEO Park Yong-soo stressed that "the nation does not produce a single drop of crude oil and other key industrial minerals. To power economic growth and support people's livelihoods, we cannot emphasise too much that securing natural resources in foreign countries is a must for our future survival." The head of the Food and Agriculture Organization (FAO), Jacques Diouf, stated that the rise in land deals could create a form of "neocolonialism", with poor states producing food for the rich at the expense of their own hungry people.

In 2008, South Korean multinational Daewoo Logistics secured 1.3 million hectares of farmland in Madagascar to grow maize and crops for biofuels. Roughly half of the country's arable land, as well as rainforests were to be converted into palm and corn monocultures, producing food for export from a country where a third of the population and 50 percent of children under five are malnourished, using South African workers instead of locals. Local residents were not consulted or informed, despite being dependent on the land for food and income. The controversial deal played a major part in prolonged anti-government protests that resulted in over a hundred deaths. This was a source of popular resentment that contributed to the fall of then-President Marc Ravalomanana. The new president, Andry Rajoelina, cancelled the deal. Tanzania later announced that South Korea was in talks to develop 100,000 hectares for food production and processing for 700 to 800 billion won. Scheduled to be completed in 2010, it was to be the largest single piece of overseas South Korean agricultural infrastructure ever built.

In 2009, Hyundai Heavy Industries acquired a majority stake in a company cultivating 10,000 hectares of farmland in the Russian Far East and a South Korean provincial government secured 95,000 hectares of farmland in Oriental Mindoro, central Philippines, to grow corn. The South Jeolla province became the first provincial government to benefit from a new central government fund to develop farmland overseas, receiving a loan of $1.9 million. The project was expected to produce 10,000 tonnes of feed in the first year. South Korean multinationals and provincial governments purchased land in Sulawesi, Indonesia, Cambodia and Bulgan, Mongolia. The national South Korean government announced its intention to invest 30 billion won in land in Paraguay and Uruguay. As of 2009 discussions with Laos, Myanmar and Senegal were underway.

== Cultural approaches ==
Although the concept of neocolonialism was originally developed within a Marxist theoretical framework and is generally employed by the political left, the term "neocolonialism" is found in other theoretical frameworks.

=== Cultural neocolonialism ===
Scholars argue that cultural neocolonialism occurs when ideas, values, and knowledge systems originating from former colonial powers are promoted as universally valid, which ends up marginalising local cultural practices and ways of knowing in the global South. This influence often appears in development programs, humanitarian initiatives, and educational systems that prioritise Euro-American concepts of modernity, rationality, and progress. This cultural dominance can shape how communities understand gender roles, family structures, and social norms, especially when Western NGOs or religious organisations promote gender and sexuality frameworks that do not align with local histories or Indigenous identities.

Critics argue that cultural neocolonialism reinforces global power hierarchies by deciding which identities, languages, and ways of knowing are seen as legitimate or "modern," and by limiting the ability of postcolonial societies to interpret their own cultural, social, and political realities on their own terms.

=== Coloniality ===
"Coloniality" claims that knowledge production is strongly influenced by the context of the person producing the knowledge and that this has further disadvantaged developing countries with limited knowledge production infrastructure. It originated among critics of subaltern theories, which, although strongly de-colonial, are less concerned with the source of knowledge.

=== Cultural theory ===
Map of the European Union in the world, with Overseas Countries and Territories (OCT) in green and Outermost Regions (OMR) in blue

One variant of neocolonialism theory critiques cultural colonialism, the desire of wealthy nations to control other nations' values and perceptions through cultural means such as media, language, education and religion, ultimately for economic reasons.

=== Gender construction ===
Concepts of neocolonialism can be found in theoretical works investigating gender outside the global north. Often these conceptions can be seen as erasing gender norms within communities in the global south to create conceptions of gender that align with the global north. Gerise Herndon argues that feminist and other theoretical approaches to gender need to attend to how individual subjects are positioned between their own cultural contexts and external societies that exercise neocolonial power. In her article "Gender Construction and Neocolonialism", she reads the fiction of Maryse Condé to show how women in newly independent Caribbean and African nations negotiate identities shaped both by local patriarchal norms and by lingering expectations from former colonial powers. Herndon suggests that projects of "modernization" and development can pressure women to adopt new gender roles while still being judged against colonial ideals, making gender identity a key site where neocolonial relations are reproduced.

An example of the construction of gender norms and conceptions by neocolonial interests is made clear in the Ugandan Anti-Homosexuality Act introduced in 2009 and passed in 2014. The act expanded upon previously existing laws against sodomy to make gay relationships punishable by life imprisonment. The call for this bill came from Ugandans who claimed traditional African values that did not include homosexuality. This act faced backlash from western countries, citing human rights violations. The United States imposed economic sanctions against Uganda in June 2014 in response to the law, the World Bank indefinitely postponed a $90 million aid loan to Uganda and the governments of Denmark, the Netherlands, Sweden and Norway halted aid to Uganda in opposition to the law; the Ugandan government defended the bill and rejected condemnation of it, with the country's authorities stating President Museveni wanted "to demonstrate Uganda's independence in the face of Western pressure and provocation". The Ugandan response was to claim that this was a neocolonialist attack on their culture. Kristen Cheney argued that this is a misrepresentation of neocolonialism at work and that this conception of gender and anti-homosexuality erased historically diverse gender identities in Africa. To Cheney, neocolonialism was found in accepting conservative gender identity politics, specifically those of U.S.-based Evangelical Christians. Before the introduction of this act, conservative Christian groups in the United States had put African religious leaders and politicians on their payroll, reflecting the talking points of U.S.-based Christian evangelism. Cheney argues that this adoption and bankrolling of U.S. conservative Christian evangelist thought in Uganda is the real neocolonialism and effectively erodes any historical gender diversity in Africa.

=== Beauty standards ===
Global gender constructions are often inseparable from their Western, Eurocentric influence. As put by feminist sociologist Meeta Rani Jha, Eurocentric beauty ideals, which are often valorized in beauty pageants and classic Disney films, "exercise social control over female bodies generating fantasies, inspiration, injury, and inequality" She suggests that beauty plays a key role in the exercise of power and feminine identifications in a contemporary consumer culture, and describes how racism, sexism, and colorism intersect in the modern world to define feminine identity.

This ideology can be seen in many modern East Asian cultures. South Korea is a unique case of a country heavily influenced by Western beauty standards and culture, even though they lack the traditional Western colonial history. Though hailed as a major leader in beauty products and procedures over the past few decades, much of South Korean beauty standards have historical origins. South Korea headlines in the early 2000s expressed the sentiment that "Americanization is globalization". Nowadays, it is well documented that South Korean beauty brands have faced backlash for their skin tone shade range, with shades often leaning very pale. They are also well-known globally for their minor cosmetic/plastic surgery industry. With operations notably cheaper and clinics easily accessible in local malls, aesthetic surgery has become trivialized as something that "everyone does". South Korea has long been dominated by the Western image of ideal beauty, and their most popular surgeries reflect this dominant influence. The most common procedures, blepharoplasties (double-eyelid surgeries) and rhinoplasties (nose reshaping, typically to get a higher nose bridge), are manifestations of Western beauty standards, and continue the perpetuation of the Western standard as "universal". By undermining local beauty standards and identities, cultural neocolonialism continues to undermine local customs, and assert indirect control on marginalized groups. Jha argues that techniques such as skin-lightening and cosmetic surgery are rooted in desires to "surpass racial and working-class penalties" which leads back to lasting effects of neocolonialism.

== See also ==
- Academic imperialism
- Americanization
- Colonialism
- Cultural hegemony
- Cultural imperialism
- Dependency theory
- Ecological imperialism
- François-Xavier Verschave's book on Françafrique
- Gatekeeper state: the concept of neocolonial "successor states", introduced by the African historian Frederick Cooper in Africa Since 1940: The Past of the Present.
- Global apartheid
- Hegemony
- Human capital flight
- Impact of Western European colonialism and colonisation
- Imperialism
- List of coups d'état and coup attempts
- Modernization theory
- Neocolonial racism
- Neoliberalism
- New imperialism
- Postcolonialism
- Sino-African relations
- Trans-Pacific Partnership
- Washington Consensus
