= Paul Giles (academic) =

Academic, author and researcher

- Born: 13 September 1957 (age 69); London, England
- Occupations: Academic, author and researcher
- Awards: Fellow, Australian Academy for the Humanities

Academic background
- Education: B.A. M.A. D. Phil in English
- Alma mater: Oxford University

Academic work
- Institutions: Institute for Humanities and Social Sciences, Australian Catholic University

Paul Giles FAHA is an English-born academic, author and researcher. He is a Professor of English in the Institute for Humanities and Social Sciences at the Australian Catholic University in Melbourne. He is also an Honorary Professor at the University of Sydney.

Giles’ research interests surround the theory and practice of transnationalism and the American literature and culture. Some of his books include Transnationalism in Practice: Essays on American Studies, Literature and Religion (2010); Transatlantic Insurrections: British Culture and the Formation of American Literature, 1730–1860 (2001); Atlantic Republic: The American Tradition in English Literature (2006); American Catholic Arts and Fictions: Culture, Ideology, Aesthetics (1992); Virtual Americas: Transnational Fictions and the Transatlantic Imaginary (2002); The Global Remapping of American Literature (2011); and Hart Crane: The Contexts of The Bridge (1986). More recently, he has extended this transnational method to Australian literature, in Backgazing: Reverse Time in Modernist Culture (2019) and The Planetary Clock: Antipodean Time and Spherical Postmodern Fictions (2021).

Giles is a Fellow of the Australian Academy for the Humanities and was from 2002 to 2009 a Professorial Fellow at Linacre College, Oxford, where he continued as a Supernumerary Fellow until 2023. He is a series Editor for Anthem Studies in Global English Literatures and has been a co-editor of Australasian Journal of American Studies and was an Editor of American literature, Oxford Handbooks Online. He is a member of the advisory board for the Institute of World Literature.

== Education ==
Giles was educated at Brentwood School in Essex, and then did his B.A in English at Christ Church, Oxford in 1979, graduating with First Class honours. He received his M.A. in 1984 and his D.Phil. in 1985 from Oxford.

== Career ==
After completing his D.Phil., Giles began his academic career as a lecturer in Humanities at the University of Staffordshire from 1985 to 1987. He then worked as an Assistant and subsequently as a tenured Associate Professor of English at Portland State University in Oregon from 1987 to 1994, after which he returned to the UK and was a Lecturer and Reader in American Studies at the University of Nottingham until 1999. He then moved to Cambridge University as a University Lecturer in American Literature and Fellow of Fitzwilliam College till 2002. He then returned to Oxford where he became statutory Reader in American Literature from 2002 to 2009, with the title of Professor. In January 2010 he moved to Australia, where he worked at the University of Sydney as Challis Professor of English until 2022. He is now a Professor of English in the Institute for Humanities and Social Sciences at the Australian Catholic University in Melbourne.

Giles served as the Director of Rothermere American Institute at Oxford from 2003 to 2008. He was also President of the International American Studies Association from 2005 to 2007, and served as President of the International Association of University Professors of English from 2019 to 2023.

== Research ==
Most of Giles's research has been focused upon transnational approaches to American literature and culture. Initially his research interests centered on American modernist poetry, which resulted in his first book on Hart Crane that developed out of his PhD In 1987, his interests developed into a study of secularized transformations of Catholicism and its impact on American culture, and after his return to England he continued to work on transatlantic literary relations and American culture in an international context. After his move to Australia, this comparative perspective was given a specifically transpacific dimension. His most recent work includes a comparative cultural study of temporality in the modernist and postmodernist periods.

=== Theory and Practice of Transnationalism ===
In a 2019 address to the English Language and Literature Association of Korea, Giles suggested that civil wars might be perceived as precursors to transnational understandings of a national body. He had previously written in Transatlantic Insurrections about how the American Revolution might be understood as a civil war, and in Atlantic Republic of how American ideologies of liberty opened up divisions with the British body politic. An article by him argues that historic treatments of romanticism have, more often than not, overlooked the complicated ways in which transpacific space enters into Romantic poetics and how those aesthetic constructions have molded global political imaginaries. He has also discussed the academic institutionalization of English studies as a comparatively recent phenomenon, something that occurred many centuries after the establishment of the Classics, and he explains how the subject's fast expansion happened after World War II. In another article, he suggested a new scholarly direction in the field of American Studies as he outlined the specific challenges and opportunities that come with teaching such a course within an Australian context.

In his book Backgazing: Reverse Time in Modernist Culture, Giles focused on the way time is characterized in reverse forms all through modernist literature and culture. It is specifically concerned with the way in which antipodean reorientations of chronological scale reconfigure the way in which conventional temporal categories of modernism are comprehended. Philip Mead in the Australian Book Review said "Two of the bravura readings at the centre of this study are of Thomas Mann and Eleanor Dark. It's worth reading this book for these alone...There are many fascinating points of difference with Dark. There is also a fascinating interlude about H.G. Wells, his entanglements with Australia, and his The Conquest of Time (1942), with a fitting preface about Douglas Sirk's 1937 film To New Shores (Zu neuen Ufern)" In her review article "Telling Time in Modernism," published in Modernism/Modernity 30.1 (January 2023), Sarah Cole (Columbia University) wrote: "A first dimension of Giles's argument is to add Australian voices (literary voices, of course, but also critical ones) to the discussion of modernism . . . I will confess that up to now, I had no familiarity with any of these authors, and reading about their works was a real joy. Giles is a superb critic, and he brings these works into full literary life, making the case for their interest and value in their own right, and even more in a rich dialogue with modernists who are more widely known . . . Each chapter works through the overarching concepts of backgazing, antipodean modernism, and retrodynamics, offering myriad examples and superb, often brief, readings of its many authors, so that one comes away with a strong sense of the power of this thesis to explain and characterize a huge array of texts and their preoccupations . . . making a good case, over the course of its many readings, for the presence of Australia as a space that carries significant meanings and textual consequences throughout modernist thought." In another book entitled The Planetary Clock, he talks about how time is represented in postmodern culture and how temporality manifests itself as a global phenomenon across an antipodean axis. The earlier book Transatlantic Insurrections: British Culture and the Formation of American Literature details the paradoxical relations between English and American Literature from 1730 to 1860. It describes the way in which literary traditions are formed within each national culture and their deep dependency upon negotiations with each other's transatlantic counterpart. He detailed how going beyond the British culture's conventions were crucial for the making of American literature as a separate entity, and he describes how the consolidation of British cultural identity evolved in part as a response to the need to stifle the memory and consequences of losing the United States in the American revolutionary wars. Lance Newman in his review praised the book and said that “This is the kind of sensitively historicist approach we need to understand the period’s complex and fluid co-evolution of British and American literary cultures and national identities.” In Antipodean America: Australasia and the Constitution of U. S. Literature, Giles talks about how the formation of American literature has been affected by Australia and New Zealand since the eighteenth century. It discusses how the antipodes, as a historical fact and a philosophical idea, influenced American writers in the territory that came to be called Australasia after the British settlement of this South Pacific region. A review by Nicholas Birns in the Journal of the Association for the Study of Australian Literature stated that "Giles possesses an uncanny ability to mount a paradigmatic, discipline-altering argument while giving convincing, interesting close readings of books and careers, a feature that makes this book at once not just an interpretively dazzling performance but a book that teacher and student can have ready at hand, to consult for reference, and, since the book is written with flair and elegance, delight."

=== American Literature and Culture ===
In a 2017 paper, Giles considers the relation between institutional formations of World Literature and International American Studies. Comparisons are made between International American Studies and the American Studies movement that emerged from the United States itself. His book The Global Remapping of American Literature lays out how the cartographies of the field, as an institutional category, have fluctuated across different times and spaces. According to Philip Mead “Giles has done important work reimagining North American literary history as allied rather than isolationist – revisioning American literature not as the definition of landlocked nation or exceptional homeland but as the product of transatlantic and continental traverses of forms and voices.” In Transnationalism in Practice: Essays on American Studies, Literature and Religion, Giles presents a collection of fourteen different essays spanning 1994 to 2004 on the topic of American studies, literature and religion. In his introduction for this book, he outlines the evolution of critical transnationalism as it grew in the 1980s and 1990s. He also discussed secular transformations of religious ideas in American Catholic Arts and Fictions: Culture, Ideology, Aesthetics, as they mold the style and substance of works by American artists, filmmakers, and writers with Catholic backgrounds. He describes how American writers have represented and mythologized Catholicism, often in oblique or indirect ways. According to James T. Fisher in the Modern Language Quarterly, "Students of American Catholic literature and history will read Paul Giles's American Catholic Arts and Fictions: Culture, Ideology, Aesthetics with a deep sense of gratitude for his unprecedented effort to apply the insights of contemporary literary theory to an astonishing variety of Catholic texts....I was moved by the respectful intensity the author brings to his study of artists richly deserving of such elegant treatment. American Catholic Arts and Fictions is a remarkable achievement as well as a historical event." In Contemporary Literature, Jonathan Veitch wrote: “American Catholic Arts and Fictions: Culture, Ideology, Aesthetics is a tour de force, a magisterial study of Catholicism and the American arts. But its subject is not limited to religion . . . Giles handles complex theological questions deftly, and he does so while meeting the highest standards of cultural criticism. But more importantly, Giles has achieved the rare feat of reorienting the cultural landscape in such a way that it will be hard to read the literature of this century in quite the same manner again.”

== Awards and honors ==
- 1999 – Arthur Miller Prize for best article in the field of American Studies by a U.K. citizen, for “Virtual Americas” (American Quarterly)
- 2003 – Honorable Mention for best essay of the year in PMLA, William Riley Parker prize, for “Transnationalism and Classic American Literature”
- 2005 – Hirst Visiting Professor, Washington University in St. Louis
- 2009 – Visiting Fellow, Australian National University, Canberra
- 2012 – Fellow, Australian Academy for the Humanities
- 2014 – Short-listed in General History category, NSW Premier's History Awards, for Antipodean America
- 2021 – Book prize for The Planetary Clock, Australian University Heads of English

== Bibliography ==
=== Books ===
- Hart Crane: The Contexts of "The Bridge" (1986). Cambridge University Press. ISBN 978-0521107006
- American Catholic Arts and Fictions: Culture, Ideology, Aesthetics (1992). Cambridge University Press. ISBN 978-0521417778
- Transatlantic Insurrections: British Culture and the Formation of American Literature, 1730–1860 (2001). University of Pennsylvania Press. ISBN 978-0812236033
- Virtual Americas: Transnational Fictions and the Transatlantic Imaginary (New Americanists) (2002). Duke University Press. ISBN 978-0822329671
- Atlantic Republic: The American Tradition in English Literature (2006). Oxford University Press. ISBN 978-0199206339
- Transpacific Republicanism: American Transcendentalism, John Dunmore and the Gold-Rush Circuit (2010). La Trobe University. ISBN 9781921377938
- Transnationalism in Practice: Essays on American Studies, Literature and Religion (2010). Edinburgh University Press. ISBN 9781474468480
- The Global Remapping of American Literature (2011). Princeton University Press. ISBN 9780691136134
- Antipodean America: Australasia and the Constitution of U.S. Literature (2013). Oxford University Press. ISBN 9780199301577
- Backgazing: Reverse Time in Modernist Culture (2019). Oxford University Press. ISBN 9780192566218
- American World Literature: An Introduction (2019). Wiley-Blackwell. ISBN 9781119431787
- The Planetary Clock: Antipodean Time and Spherical Postmodern Fictions (2021). Oxford University Press. ISBN 9780192599506
- The Global Remapping of American Literature (in Russian translation) (2023). Academic Studies Press. ISBN 9798887194080
- Canonical Network Television: Critical Aesthetics and Cultural History, 1960-1999 (2027). Routledge. ISBN 9781041290766

=== Selected Essays ===
- “Deterritorialization in The Sacred Fount”, The Henry James Review (2003)
- “Transnationalism and Classic American Literature”, PMLA (2003)
- "The Earth reversed her Hemispheres": Dickinson's Global Antipodality.” The Emily Dickinson Journal (2011)
- "Axel's Castle.” Essays in Criticism (2011)
- "The Postcolonial Mainstream." American Literary History (2011)
- "Bernard Smith in Space and Time: 'The Antipodean Manifesto' Fifty Years Later", in Jaynie Anderson, Christopher R. Marshall, Andrew Yip (Eds.), The Legacies of Bernard Smith: Essays on Australian Art, History and Cultural Politics, Sydney: Power Publications. (2016)
- "Transnational Thoreau: Time, Space, and Relativity". In Kristen Case, K. P. Van Anglen (Eds.), Thoreau at 200: Essays and Reassessments, New York: Cambridge University Press. (2016)
- "By Degrees": Jane Austen's Chronometric Style of World Literature, Nineteenth-Century Literature (2020)
- "Irish-Australian Literature: Ghosts, Genealogy, Tradition", Australian Literary Studies (2021)
- "The Crosstemporal Conundrum: Indigenous Specters in Antebellum American Literature", Amerikastudien (2021)
- "Wordsworth's Antipodean Poetics." Studies in Romanticism (2022).
- ″Decolonizing the University,″ in Ato Quayson and Ankhi Mukherjee (Eds.), Decolonizing the English Literary Curriculum, Cambridge University Press (2024)
