= The Global Remapping of American Literature =

2011 book by Paul Giles

- Cover
- Author: Paul Giles
- Language: English
- Subject: American literature, American literary history, cultural geography, literary criticism
- Genre: Non-fiction
- Publisher: Princeton University Press
- Publication date: January 23, 2011
- Publication place: United States
- Media type: Print (Hardcover, Paperback), E-book
- Pages: 344
- ISBN: 9780691136134

The Global Remapping of American Literature is a 2011 book by British-Australian literary scholar and author Paul Giles. Giles studies how conceptions and definitions of American literature have changed over time in response to shifting national boundaries, cultural influences, and global contexts. He argues that American literature emerged distinctly as a national category after the U.S. Civil War, and continued through the late 20th century, but has since been reshaped by globalization. Giles maps the evolution of American literature through his analysis of authors such as Ralph Waldo Emerson, Herman Melville, F. Scott Fitzgerald, Gertrude Stein, Zora Neale Hurston, Elizabeth Bishop, and William Gibson. The book received an honorable mention for the 2012 BAAS Book Prize and was shortlisted for the 2012 American Studies Network Prize. This book also appeared in a Russian translation by Olga Poley, published by Academic Studies Press, in 2023. (Note: ISBN 979-8-88719-408-0)

== Summary ==
Giles studies the evolving relationship between American literature and geographical concepts. He argued that the categorization of American literature as a national entity was primarily consolidated between the end of the U.S. Civil War in 1865 and the early presidency of Ronald Reagan in 1981. Giles suggests that before and after this period, American literature experienced more fluid boundaries influenced by global contexts.

Giles structures the book into three main parts:

1. Part one: Temporal Latitudes
2. Part two: The Boundaries of the Nation
3. Part three: Spatial Longitudes

Giles considers in the first part of the book literary engagements with historical periods distant from contemporary America, and studies Augustan influences in early American writing and medievalism in nineteenth-century literature. He analyzes Cotton Mather, Phillis Wheatley, Ralph Waldo Emerson, and Herman Melville to illustrate how their writing reflected broader temporal and spatial frameworks beyond national boundaries.

In the second part, he investigates modernist and postmodernist authors who grapple with national identity through geographical allegories and media representations. He examines the works of William Dean Howells, Wallace Stevens, Gertrude Stein, Philip Roth, Toni Morrison, John Updike, David Foster Wallace, and Dave Eggers, highlighting how technological advancements such as broadcasting reshaped national consciousness.

In the final parts of the book, Giles focuses on hemispheric and regional perspectives. He analyzed how literary representations of the American South, South America, and the Pacific Northwest illustrate a more global and multidirectional view of American culture, one shaped also by developments in digital technologies. He engages with authors such as William Bartram, William Gilmore Simms, José Martí, Zora Neale Hurston, Elizabeth Bishop, William Faulkner, Donald Barthelme, Gary Snyder, Ursula K. Le Guin, Richard Brautigan, William Gibson, and Douglas Coupland.

== Reviews ==
American historian Anna Brickhouse admired the book, calling it a smart and thought-provoking book. Brickhouse appreciated how Giles moved away from the usual national view of American literature and instead looked at it through a global lens. He showed how American literature has not only shaped the world but has also been shaped by global events and influences. She liked that Giles didn’t just celebrate globalization blindly─ he explored its uneven and complicated effects. While she didn’t agree with everything, like some of his takes on Toni Morrison, she found his research deep and his ideas fresh. She saw the book as an exciting and valuable read for anyone interested in how literature connects with the wider world.

Evan Rhodes thought the book represented a significant scholarly attempt to reassess American literature through a globalized perspective. Rhodes praised Giles for cleverly reinterpreting literary history by proposing that contemporary and early American literature share more in common with each other than either does with the nationalist literature of the nineteenth and early twentieth centuries. Giles was particularly commended for recognizing how American exceptionalism distorted interpretations of early American literature by "foreclos[ing] analysis of the multilateral networks of global exchange that shaped early American life." Rhodes considered Giles's approach noteworthy for effectively synthesizing prior transnational scholarship into cohesive narratives about American literary periods and for challenging the notion of American exceptionalism through careful literary analysis. He described Giles’s method as skillfully blending historical survey with detailed close readings, hence effectively showing how canonical American writers had often been misinterpreted through a nationalist lens. For example, Rhodes quoted Giles’s discussion of Elizabeth Bishop to illustrate how exceptionalist narratives attempted "to repatriate Bishop, to encompass her characteristic obliquity within a U.S. circumference."

Stephen Shapiro called the book one of the best literary studies he read that year and a “bravura work of skilled reorganization of the field of American Studies itself.”. Describing it as “in many ways a twenty-first century replacement for the big beasts that inaugurated modern American Studies, such as Vernon Parrington’s Main Currents in American Thought (1927-1930) and F. O. Matthiessen’s American Renaissance (1941). Shapiro thought the book did something special by rethinking how we understand American literature—not just as something tied to the U.S., but as part of a bigger, global picture. He appreciated how Giles blended detailed analysis with big ideas, covering writers from the 1600s all the way to modern times. He also liked how Giles challenged familiar ideas about American identity and showed how literature moves across borders. For Shapiro, the book didn’t just offer new insights—it pointed the way forward for how people might study American literature in the future.

In his review, Guy Risko acknowledged Giles's ambitious scope and noted that his work offered a compelling reimagining of American literature by critically reassessing traditional narratives and canonical stability. Risko described Giles's methodology as both creative and intellectually rigorous, and praised its innovative use of the concept of "parallax," a term borrowed from Slavoj Žižek, to suggest how perspectives shift the understanding of literary texts and their contexts. However, Risko expressed concerns that Giles's transnational approach risked inadvertently creating new stabilized interpretations rather than continuously destabilizing established ones. In particular, Risko worried that Giles’s critique of previous canonical interpretations, such as those of Sacvan Bercovitch, might be misread as asserting their incorrectness rather than highlighting their incompleteness or limitations.

Christian Moraru found the book both sophisticated, elegant and an essential work for anyone interested in rethinking the boundaries of American literature. By arguing that comparative approach needs to be placed, Moraru found Giles to have criticized American exceptionalism and embraced a globalized view of American literature. With different works discussed and dissected to make his point on the transnational literary landscape of America, Moraru commended Giles' work and noted that Giles being a British Americanist contributed to the case he is making in the book.

In his review, Michael Tavel Clarke commended the author by calling his work an outstanding model and example of a new critical approach which should be “indispensable for scholars interested in the recent transnational turn in U.S. literary studies.” With an argument that the idea of American literature solidified only between 1865 and 1980, Giles argued that the literature before this time was as amorphous in its orientation as the nation's borders, wrote Clarke, so that “American literary histories that seek to project national identity back to the earliest days of colonization” are misleading. Clarke did suggest that with its emphasis on texts written in English and canonical literature, the book stayed in old paths. He concluded, 'If Giles' book is any indication, the transnational turn in U.S. literary studies seems poised not to radicalize the discipline but rather to offer modestly new approaches to a traditional subject; it is a reformist rather than a revolutionary project’.

Jason Arthur noted the “impressive chronological and generic range” of Giles’s book, noting that he is “less interested in the elasticity of the term ‘America’ than he is in the rigidity of the exceptionalism that shores up most literary histories.” Arthur observed how various wars play a key role in Giles’s literary history, with these conflicts being “less a subject matter for literature than . . . a catalyst for the development of technologies to which literature must react.” He concluded that Giles “replaces the literary-historical exceptionalism of American studies with a ‘logic of parallax’ that reveals the American perspective as one of many,” suggesting that “it’s fitting that Giles would use ‘parallax,’ a term from astronomy, to describe his method, as the change in American literary history that could come from a wide-scale adoption of his methodology would indeed be astronomical.”

James D. Bloom described the book as a wide-ranging, occasionally insightful study that, despite Giles's claim to demystify American literary geography, tackled an issue already widely recognized as contested. Bloom remarked that "Giles’s encyclopedic range [...] gets diffused early," critiquing Giles’s tendency to create theoretical complexity around ideas that were already understood. Bloom questioned why Giles presumed scholars ever viewed American literature as unproblematic territory and found certain scientific metaphors "jarring." Despite these criticisms, Bloom acknowledged the value of Giles’s detailed literary connections and historical anecdotes, suggesting the book was most effectively approached as a collection of theoretical provocations rather than a groundbreaking argument.

The book was a subject of a roundtable in the Journal of American Studies:

Hester Blum praised the book’s broad-ranging ambition, stressing its "magisterial command" and provocative ideas but questioned the depth and methodology of Giles’s numerous brief textual analyses, suggesting they risked appearing "opportunistic."

Kirsten Silva Gruesz critiqued the handling of multilingual and hemispheric contexts, particularly the engagement with José Martí, arguing Giles’s approach remained overly Anglo-centric and risked reinforcing the cultural insularity it sought to overcome.

Augusta Rohrbach lauded Giles’s ambitious historical scope and his detailed, careful reading strategies, likening his methodological approach to artistic pointillism, though she acknowledged its demanding nature.

Xiomara Santamarina appreciated the provocative re-periodization of American literary history, seeing value in the challenge to exceptionalist narratives, but criticized the lack of political engagement, arguing Giles did not sufficiently theorize the implications of globalization or address important social conflicts.

In response, Giles acknowledged these critiques and clarified that his intention was not exhaustive theoretical debate but to propose a synthesized vision of transnational literary history. He admitted he deliberately combined "close and distant" readings to unsettle conventional literary mappings. Giles defended his methodological choices and reiterated his broader aim: that is to encourage reconsideration of American literature's global relationships beyond national paradigms. He quoted author Ursula Le Guin, who hoped his book would achieve "a thoroughly unsettling and disorienting effect on the often very outdated maps of American literature used in our universities".
