= Glenda R. Carpio =

Guatemalan-Professor

Glenda R. Carpio is the Powell M. Cabot Professor of American Literature and Professor of African and African American Studies at Harvard University. Her first book, Laughing Fit to Kill: Black Humor in the Fictions of Slavery was published by Oxford University Press in 2008. Her second book, Migrant Aesthetics: Contemporary Fiction, Global Migration, and the Limits of Empathy was published by Columbia University in 2023. It as the co-winner of the 2024 Matei Calinescu Prize given by the Modern Language Association for a distinguished work of scholarship in twentieth- or twenty-first-century literature. Carpio has been named one of the ROOT.com 100 for 2010.

== Education ==
Carpio received her A.B. at Vassar College in 1991 and a Ph.D. in English from the University of California, Berkeley in 2002. She was awarded tenure at Harvard University in both the English and African and African American Studies departments in 2009.

== Career ==
Carpio started her teaching career in Compton, California where she taught 8th grade English and 4th grade through the Teach for America program. She taught at University of California at Berkeley, Pace University, and New York University prior to coming to Harvard University. She has received Harvard University's Abramson Award for Excellence and Sensitivity in Undergraduate Teaching.In

== Books ==
- Carpio, Glenda. Laughing Fit to Kill: Black Humor in the Fictions of Slavery. New York, NY: Oxford University Press, 2008. ISBN 9786611341930. According to WorldCat, the book is held in 1296 libraries
  - Review: Goddu, T.A. 2010. "Laughing Fit to Kill: Black Humor in the Fictions of Slavery by Glenda R. Carpio". American Literature. 82, no. 2: 421-42
  - ZYGMONSKI, AIMEE. 2009. "Book Review: Laughing Fit To Kill: Black Humor In The Fictions Of Slavery". Theatre Journal. 61, no. 3: 498-499.
- Carpio, G. (2019). (ed) The Cambridge companion to Richard Wright. Cambridge; New York : Cambridge University Press, 2019.
- Carpio, Glenda R., Werner Sollors, and Zora Neale Hurston. African American Literary Studies: New Texts, New Approaches, New Challenges. Heidelberg: Universitätsverlag 2010.
  - Review: Fishkin, S.F. 2011. "Glenda R. Carpio and Werner Sollors, Eds., African American Literary Studies: New Texts, New Approaches, New Challenges". African American Review. 44, no. 1/2: 280-282.
  - Review:"Book Review: Glenda R. Carpio and Werner Sollors (eds.), African American Literary Studies: New Texts, New Approaches, New Challenges Journal of American Studies. 46.2 (2012).

== Personal life ==
At 12, Carpio came to America as a Guatemalan immigrant without knowing a word of English. She splits her time between Harvard and Venice, where her husband lives.
