= B.A.A.S. =

B.A.A.S. may refer to:

- British Association for American Studies, founded in 1955
- British Association for the Advancement of Science, founded in 1831 and known as the British Science Association since 2009
