= Late Modernism: Art, Culture, and Politics in Cold War America =

2010 book

- Author: Robert Genter
- Subject: American intellectual history
- Publisher: University of Pennsylvania Press
- Publication date: 2010
- Pages: 375
- ISBN: 978-0-8122-4264-5

Late Modernism: Art, Culture, and Politics in Cold War America is a 2010 intellectual history book by Robert Genter. The author analyzes the history of thought in the postwar United States through prominent scholars, from literary critics and painters to sociologists and public intellectuals.

== Bibliography ==
- Allred, Jeff (December 2012). "Melting-Pot Modernism/Late Modernism: Art, Culture, and Politics in Cold War America". American Literature. 84 (4): 882–884. doi:10.1215/00029831-1901517. ISSN 0002-9831. EBSCOhost 85163659.
- Bonis, Daniel H. (2012). "Renewing American Modernism". Reviews in American History. 40 (3): 506–511. doi:10.1353/rah.2012.0076. ISSN 0048-7511. JSTOR 41678600. S2CID 144366311.
- Cordle, Daniel (August 15, 2012). "Late Modernism: Art, Culture, and Politics in Cold War America". Journal of American Studies. 46 (3): 784. doi:10.1017/S0021875812000941. ISSN 1469-5154. JSTOR 23256537.
- Falk, Andrew J. (September 2011). "Late Modernism: Art, Culture, and Politics in Cold War America". Journal of American History. 98 (2): 577. doi:10.1093/jahist/jar293. ISSN 0021-8723. JSTOR 41510064. EBSCOhost 66695697.
- McCormick, Paul (2012). "Late Modernism: Art, Culture, and Politics in Cold War America". College Literature. 39 (1): 150–152. doi:10.1353/lit.2012.0004. ISSN 0093-3139. JSTOR 23266048. S2CID 155045075. EBSCOhost 70063594.
- Miller, Tyrus (October 2011). "Late Modernism: Art, Culture, and Politics in Cold War America". American Historical Review. 116 (4): 1159–1160. doi:10.1086/ahr.116.4.1159a. ISSN 0002-8762. JSTOR 23307978. EBSCOhost 67091246.
- Muccigrosso, R. (June 2011). "Late Modernism: Art, Culture, and Politics in Cold War America". Choice. 48 (10): 1983. ISSN 0009-4978. ProQuest 870631778.
- Whitfield, Stephen J. (2012). "Late Modernism: Art, Culture, and Politics in Cold War America". Journal of Cold War Studies. 14 (4): 225–227. doi:10.1162/JCWS_r_00283. ISSN 1520-3972. JSTOR 26924157. EBSCOhost 85782824.
