= George Shepperson =

British historian and Africanist (1922–2020)

George Shepperson CBE
- Born: George Albert Shepperson; 7 January 1922; Peterborough, United Kingdom
- Died: 2 April 2020 (aged 98); Peterborough, United Kingdom

Academic background
- Education: St John's College, Cambridge

Academic work
- Discipline: African and North American history
- Sub-discipline: Malawian history African-American history
- Institutions: University of Edinburgh
- Notable works: Independent African: John Chilembwe and the Origins, Setting and Significance of the Nyasaland Native Rising 1915 (1958)

George "Sam" Albert Shepperson CBE (7 January 1922 – 2 April 2020) was a British historian and Africanist, noted particularly for his work on Malawian and African-American history. He was William Robertson Professor of Commonwealth and American History at the University of Edinburgh from 1963 until 1986. He was named Commander of the Order of the British Empire in 1989.

== Early life and career ==
George "Sam" Shepperson was born in Peterborough, then part of Northamptonshire, in 1922, the son of a fitter. He was educated at the King’s School, Peterborough, and read History and English at St John's College, Cambridge. He completed his Certificate of Education after his war service. He was commissioned in the Northamptonshire Regiment in February 1943, with the service number of 264651, and was on secondment to the King's African Rifles from 1943 to 1946 as an officer in the 13th (Nyasaland) Battalion, stationed in Kenya, Tanganyika, Ceylon, India and Burma. While stationed in East Africa, he developed his interest in British imperial history and Africa.

Shepperson began work teaching Imperial and American History at the University of Edinburgh in 1948 and was appointed to the William Robertson Chair in 1963, and retired in 1986. He had been a visiting professor at Roosevelt University and the University of Chicago, Rhode Island College, what is now Makerere University and Dalhousie University. He was awarded an honorary doctorate from the University of York in 1987 and was a visiting scholar at Harvard University 1986–87. In 1990 he was named a Fellow of the Educational Institute of Scotland.

Shepperson was a pathbreaking historian of the African Diaspora, the history of the African peoples and their spread across the world and was awarded the "Distinguished Africanist" award in 2007 from the African Studies Association of the United Kingdom. His research specialism was Malawian history, but he also wrote on African-American history (and was chair of the British Association for American Studies from 1971 to 1974) and black British history (particularly relating to the black presence in Scotland. Many of his writings, including on John Chilembwe and the Chilembwe uprising, are seen as seminal contributions. Independent African: John Chilembwe and the Origins, Setting and Significance of the Nyasaland Native Rising 1915 (1958) was one of the first scholarly works on African history and was widely read by African nationalists after its publication. Shepperson provided an account of his life as an Africanist historian as a contribution to The Emergence of African History at British Universities: An Autobiographical Approach (1995, edited by Anthony Kirk-Greene).

He was appointed Commander of the Order of the British Empire (CBE) in the 1989 Birthday Honours as chairman of the Scottish Committee of the Commonwealth Institute.

== Selected publications ==
- "Education sponsors freedom—the story of African native John Chilembwe", Negro History Bulletin, v. 15, January 1952.
- "Ethiopianism and African nationalism". Phylon, v. 14, (1953)
- "Frederick Douglass and Scotland", The Journal of African American History, 38, 3 (1953).
- Independent African: John Chilembwe and the Origins, Setting and Significance of the Nyasaland Native Rising 1915 (with Thomas Price) (1958; 5th edition 1987)
- "Notes on Negro American Influences on the Emergence of African Nationalism", The Journal of African History, 1, 2 (1960).
- "External factors in the development of African nationalism, with particular reference to British Central Africa". Phylon, v. 22 (1961)
- "Pan-Africanism and 'Pan-Africanism': Some Historical Notes", Phylon, 23, No. 4 (1962).
- "The Negro and the New Frontier", The Political Quarterly, 33, 2 (1962).
- "Abolitionism and African Political Thought", Transition 12 (1964).
- David Livingstone and the Rovuma: A notebook edited with introduction and related documents (1965).
- "The African diaspora: or Africa abroad", African Forum, 2 (1966)
- Myth and reality in Malawi (1966)
- West African Countries and Peoples by Africanus Horton (ed.) (1969)
- "Introduction" to The Negro by W. E. B. Du Bois (Oxford University Press, 1970)
- "Mungo Park and the Scottish Contribution to Africa", African Affairs, 70, (1971)
- Joseph Booth and the African Diaspora (1972)
- "Kipling and the Boer War" in John Goss (ed.), Kipling: The man, his work and his world (1972)
- Scotland, Europe, and the American Revolution (co-edited with Owen Dudley Edwards) (1976)
- "America through Africa and Asia", Journal of American Studies, Vol. 14, No. 1, BAAS Jubilee Issue (April 1980).
- "The Fifth Pan-African Conference, 1945 and the All African Peoples Congress, 1958" (with St. Clair Drake), Contributions in Black Studies, 8, 5 (1986)
- "Malawi and the Poetry of Two World Wars", The Society of Malawi Journal, 43, 2 (1990).
- "African Diaspora: Concept and Context" in Global Dimensions of the African Diaspora, edited by Joseph E. Harris (1993).
- "Paul Robeson in Edinburgh". University of Edinburgh Journal. 37–38 (1998).
- "Memories of Dr Banda", The Society of Malawi Journal 51, 1 (1998).
- "Degree Award Oration", The Society of Malawi Journal, 56, 1 (2003).
- "Islam in Central Africa: A Historiographical Document", The Society of Malawi Journal, 59, 2 (2006).
- "A Major Chilembwe Letter", The Society of Malawi Journal, 68, 1 (2015).
- "Dr John McCracken: A personal tribute", The Society of Malawi Journal, 71, 1 (2018).
