= Rothermere American Institute =

Department of Oxford University

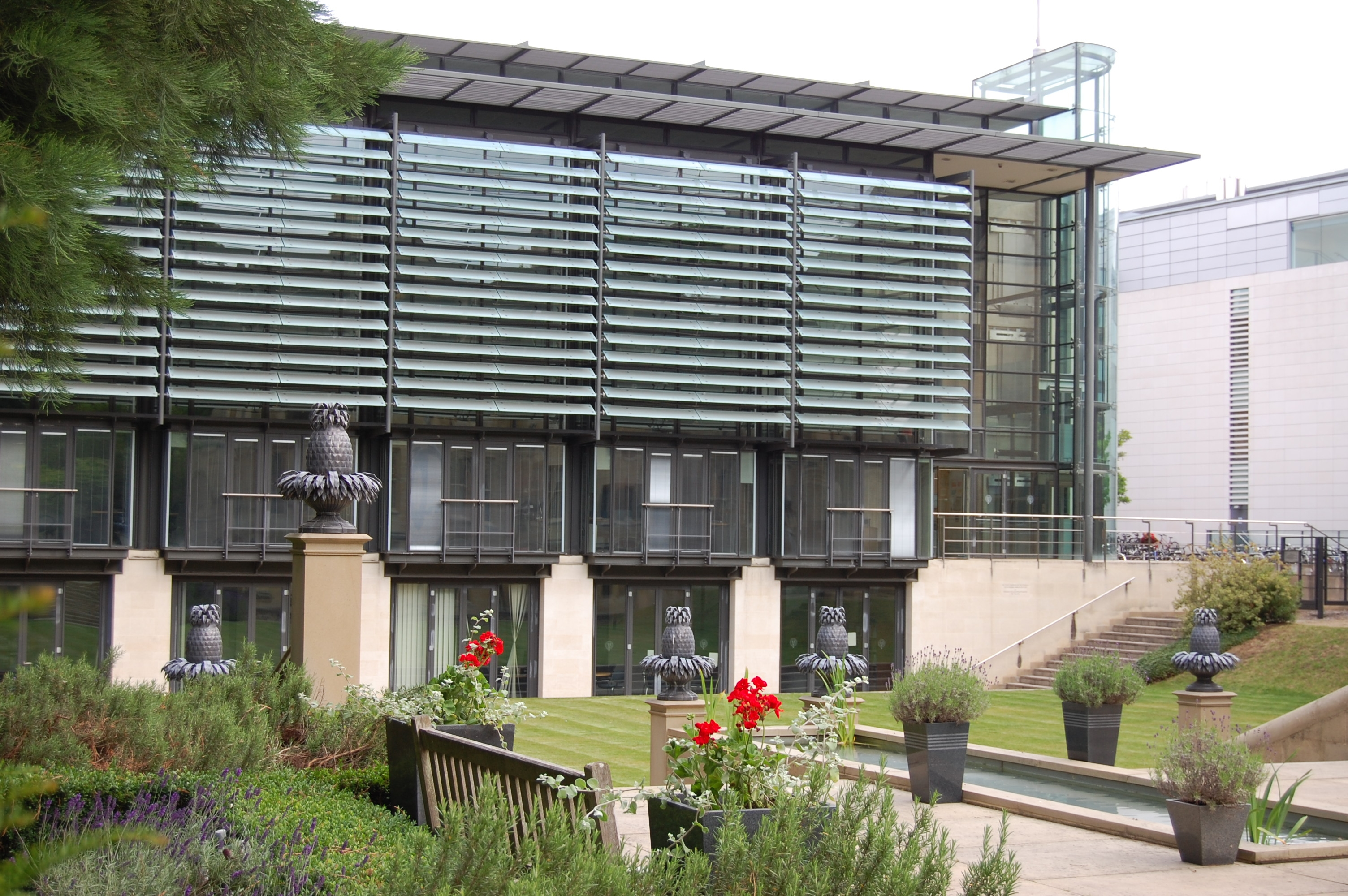
- Location: Oxford, Oxfordshire, United Kingdom; 51.75763°N 1.25385°W
- Operating agency: University of Oxford
- Website: www.rai.ox.ac.uk

Map
- Location within Oxford city centre

The Rothermere American Institute (RAI) is a research institute at the Humanities Division at the University of Oxford in Oxford, England, United Kingdom. It is dedicated to the interdisciplinary and comparative study of the United States of America and its place in the world.

Named after the Harmsworth family, Viscounts Rothermere, it was opened in May 2001 by former US President Bill Clinton. It hosts conferences, lectures and seminars in the fields of American history, politics, foreign relations, and literature. Guests and speakers have included Queen Elizabeth, former US President Jimmy Carter, Jesse Jackson, Justice Sandra Day O'Connor and Chris Patten. The institute hosts four of the university's chairs and two visiting professorships.

The institute's current director is Adam I. P. Smith. It offers visiting fellowships to scholars of American studies, scholarships to study for a doctorate at Oxford in US history or politics, and various travel awards. Oxford University's annual Esmond Harmsworth Lecture in American Arts and Letters is held there.

== See also ==
- American Studies in Britain
