= The Short Oxford History of the Modern World =

Book series published by Oxford University

The Short Oxford History of the Modern World series is a book series published by the Oxford University Press publishing house.

Each book gives a comprehensive introduction to a particular period or theme in history.

The general editor for the series was J.M. Roberts.

== List of Books in the Series ==
Title	Author(s)	Publishing date	Other editions	Ref
Empire to Welfare State: English History, 1906-67	T.O. LLoyd	June 11, 1970	1906-76, 2nd ed. (April 1979); 1906-85, 3rd ed. (October 16, 1986); 1906-92, 4th ed. (July 22, 1993); 1906-2001, 5th ed. (May 2, 2002)	
The Crisis of Parliaments: English History, 1509-1660	Conrad Russell	April 1, 1971		
Endurance and Endeavour: Russian History, 1812-1971	J.N. Westwood	February 15, 1973	1812-1980, 2nd ed. (December 1981; 1812-1986, 3rd ed. (July 16, 1987); 1812-1992, 4th ed. (April 12, 1992); 1812-2001, 5th ed. (October 17, 2002)	
The Old European Order, 1660-1800	William Doyle	November 30, 1978	2nd ed. (November 26, 1992)	
The Limits of Liberty: American History 1607-1980	Maldwyn A. Jones	December 1983	1607-1992 (March 9, 1995)	
The British Empire, 1558-1983	T.O. LLoyd	October 1, 1984	1558-1995, 2nd ed. (November 21, 1996)	
Modern India: The Origins of an Asian Democracy	Judith Brown	February 1985	2nd ed. (May 1, 1994)	
Barricades and Borders: Europe, 1800-1914	Robert Gildea	June 1, 1987	2nd ed. (March 1996); 3rd ed. (March 6, 2003)	
Rebellions and Revolutions: China from the 1800s to the 1980s	Jack Gray	May 1, 1990	1800s to 2000, 2nd ed. (April 3, 2003)	
British History 1815-1914	Norman McCord; Bill Purdue	May 23, 1991	2nd ed. (October 25, 2007)	
The European Dynastic States, 1494-1660	Richard Bonney	December 1, 1991		
Albion Ascendant: English History 1660-1815	Wilfrid Prest	June 4, 1998		
The Pursuit of Power in Modern Japan, 1825-1995	Chushichi Tsuzuki	April 13, 2000		
