= Maldwyn Jones =

Welsh historian

Maldwyn Allen Jones (18 December 1922 – 12 April 2007) was a historian who specialised in American history.

Jones studied at Jesus College, Oxford, from 1946 to 1949, obtaining a first-class degree in history. He was a lecturer at Manchester University before becoming chairman of the British Association for American Studies in 1968 and Commonwealth Professor of American History at University College London in 1971.

His most famous work was the synthesis The Limits of Liberty: American History 1607-1980, a volume in the "Short Oxford History of the Modern World" series, published in 1983. This remains the most comprehensive single-authored book on American history.

== Publications ==
=== Books ===
- American Immigration (University of Chicago Press, 1961)
- Destination America (Weidenfeld Nicolson, 1976) ISBN 9780297770763
- The Limits of Liberty: American History 1607-1980 (Oxford University Press, 1983) ISBN 9780199130740

==== As editor ====
- Maldwyn Jones, Henry Steele Commager and Marcus Cunliffe (eds.), The American Destiny: an Illustrated Bicentennial History of the United States (20 vols., 1976)

=== Articles ===
- "Ulster emigration, 1783—1815". In E. R. R. Green (ed.), Essays in Scotch-Irish History (London: Routledge, 1969)
- "The background to emigration from Great Britain in the nineteenth century". In Donald Fleming and Bernard Bailyn (eds.), Dislocation and Emigration: The Social Background of American Immigration, pp. 3–92 (Cambridge, MA, 1973)
- "From the Old Country to the New: The Welsh in nineteenth-century America", Flintshire Historical Society Publications, 27 (1975–76): 85–100.
- "The Scotch-Irish in British America". In Bernard Bailyn and Philip D. Morgan (eds.), Strangers within the Realm: Cultural Margins of the First British Empire (Chapel Hill: University of North Carolina Press, 1991) ISBN 9780807819524
