= The Limits of Liberty =

The Limits of Liberty: American History 1607-1980
- First edition
- Author: Maldwyn A. Jones
- Language: English
- Series: The Short Oxford History of the Modern World
- Subject: United States History
- Publisher: Oxford University Press
- Publication date: 1983
- Publication place: Great Britain
- Media type: Print (Hardcover and Paperback)
- Pages: 680
- ISBN: 0-19-913130-9
- OCLC: 9393439
- Dewey Decimal: 973 19
- LC Class: E178.1 .J775 1983

The Limits of Liberty: American History 1607-1980 is a book by historian Maldwyn Jones, first published in 1983 in the Short Oxford History of the Modern World series.

It covers 373 years of American history and is the most comprehensive single-authored book on this topic, taking nearly 20 years for the author to complete.

== Contents ==
The book contains 28 chapters, as well as an extensive bibliography, 15 pages of historical maps, population tables, details of presidential elections and a list of justices of the Supreme Court.

== Chapters ==
1. Colonial Foundations, 1607–1760
2. Provincial Expansion, 1700–1763
3. Revolution and Independence, 1763–1783
4. The Revolutionary Transformation, 1776–1789
5. The Federalist Age, 1789–1801
6. Jeffersonian Republicanism, 1801–1824
7. The Expanding Union, 1815–1860
8. The Politics of Egalitarianism, 1824–1844
9. Social and Cultural Ferment, 1820–1860
10. Westward Expansion and Sectional Conflict, 1844–1850
11. The Road to Secession, 1850–1861
12. The Civil War, 1861–1865
13. Reconstruction, 1865–1877
14. The New South and the Negro, 1877–1914
15. Taming the West, 1865–1900
16. The Growth of an Industrial Economy, 1865–1914
17. Society and Culture in the Industrial Era, 1860–1910
18. Politics from Conservatism to Revolt, 1877–1896
19. The Progressive Era, 1900–1917
20. The United States and World Affairs, 1865–1914
21. The United States and the First World War, 1914–1920
22. After the War, 1919–1929
23. The Great Depression 1929-1939
24. Foreign Policy between the Wars, 1921–1941
25. Global War, 1941–1945
26. Cold War Tensions, 1945–1960
27. The Troubled Years, 1960–1980
28. American Society and Culture, 1940–1980
