= American studies in Germany =

Teaching and research in German American studies is mostly done on the level of universities. Many English studies departments have one or more professorships designated as "Amerikanistik" or "Amerikastudien". Some universities offer full American studies programs or even have individual American studies departments consisting of several, specialized professorships and an individual budget.

== Information ==
On a national level, the German Association for American Studies (Deutsche Gesellschaft für Amerikastudien, DGfA) organizes annual conventions and smaller local congresses.

The most important periodical publishing venue is the quarterly Amerikastudien American Studies, the official publication organ of the German Association for American Studies.
