= Arts and Humanities Citation Index =

Citation index

- Producer: Clarivate Analytics (Canada and Hong Kong)

Access
- Providers: Web of Science, Dialog Bluesheets
- Cost: Subscription

Coverage
- Disciplines: Arts, Humanities, Language (including Linguistics), Poetry, Music, Classical works, History, Oriental Studies, Philosophy, Archaeology, Architecture, Religion, Television, Theater, and Radio
- Record depth: Index, abstract, citation indexing, author
- Format coverage: original research articles, reviews, editorials, chronologies, abstracts, scripts, letters, editorials, meeting abstracts, errata, poems, short stories, plays, music scores, excerpts from books, chronologies, bibliographies and filmographies, book reviews, films, music, and theatrical performances
- Temporal coverage: 1975–present
- Geospatial coverage: global

Links
- Website: clarivate.com/webofsciencegroup/solutions/webofscience-arts-and-humanities-citation-index/

The Arts and Humanities Citation Index (AHCI), also known as Arts and Humanities Search, is a citation index, with abstracting and indexing for more than 1,700 arts and humanities academic journals. Part of this database is derived from Current Contents.

Subjects covered are the arts, humanities, language (including linguistics), poetry, music, classical works, history, oriental studies, philosophy, archaeology, architecture, religion, television, theater, and radio.

Coverage includes articles, letters, editorials, meeting abstracts, errata, poems, short stories, plays, music scores, excerpts from books, chronologies, bibliographies and filmographies, as well as citations to reviews of books, films, music, and theatrical performances.

This database can be accessed online through Web of Science. It provides access to current and retrospective bibliographic information and cited references. It also covers individually selected, relevant items from approximately 1,200 titles, mostly arts and humanities journals but with an unspecified number of titles from other disciplines.

As of 2011, the Arts and Humanities Search could be accessed via Dialog, DataStar, and OCLC, with weekly updates and backfiles to 1980.

Scholar Rainer Enrique Hamel has criticized AHCI for its poor reflection of scientific production in languages other than English. Also, while analyzing solely content in Spanish of 2006, Hamel found that there were more Spanish-language publications from authors based in the United States in the index than from any other Spanish-language country.

== History ==
The index was originally developed by the Institute for Scientific Information, which was later acquired by Thomson Scientific. It is now published by Thomson Reuters' IP & Science division.

== See also ==
- Science Citation Index
- Social Sciences Citation Index
- List of academic databases and search engines
