= Neocolonial racism =

Subgroup of racism

Neocolonial racism is a subgroup of racism, inspired by the power dynamics left by the power and wealth disparages of a colonial landscape.

This subgroup of racism is typified by a hierarchy of classes dictated by race or ethnic group whose place in the hierarchy coincides with the level of the ethnic group during time of the foreign control; often colonial racism is seen as a power tool of elites to maintain order. Some qualities of the racism include a mainstream history that is imposed by elites, "willfully accepted false memories" of popular icons who fought the racial ideas, and large disparages between the elite of colonial ruler ethnicity and the poor of the colonized ethnicity. Most often this type of racism lends to continuous and long term violence, but it can also include power dynamics continued by volunteering activities. It does not apply when Native peoples dominate the political landscape after an uprising or forced destruction of the invaders control, nor when the invasion itself was ineffective and never completed.

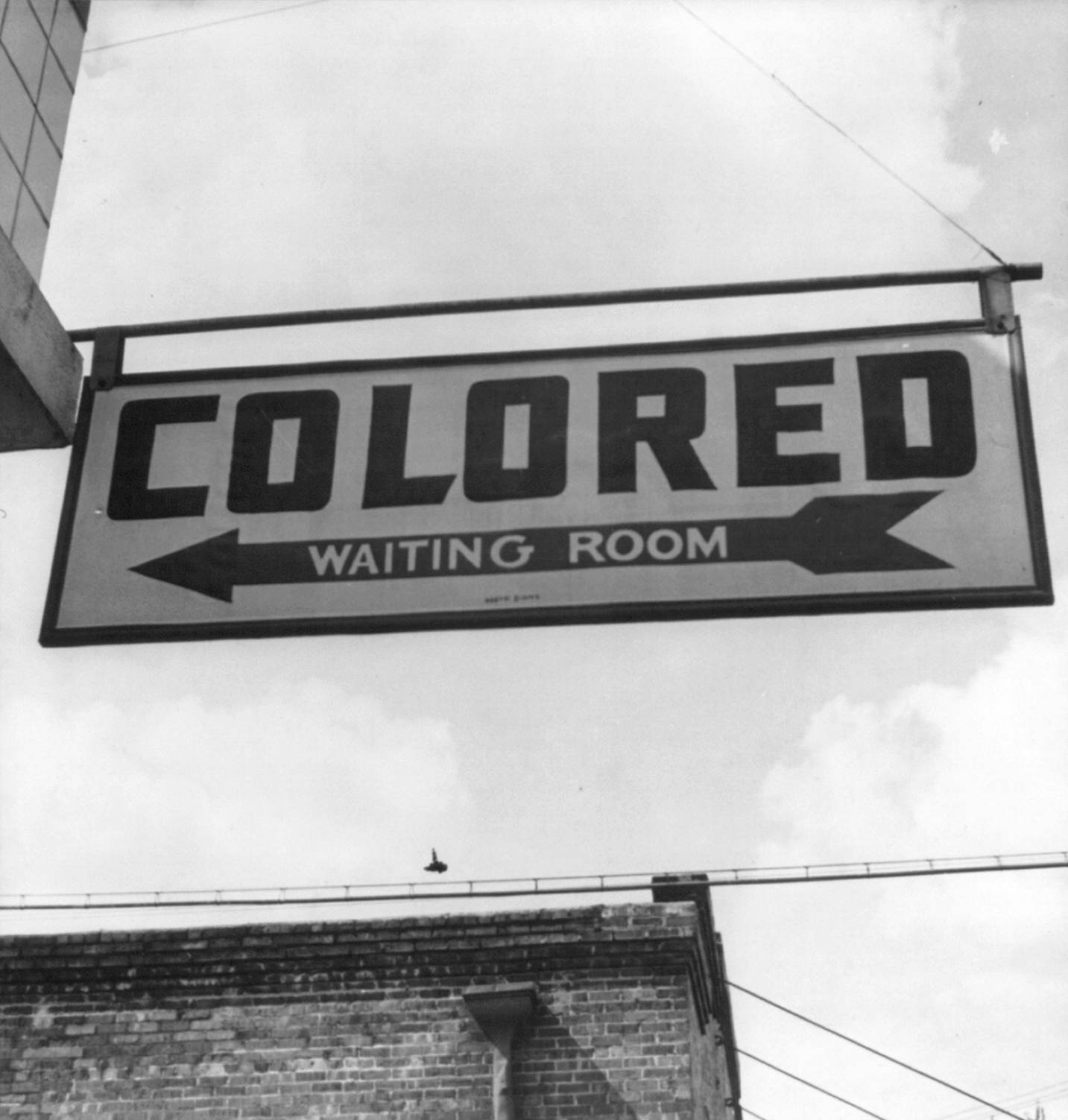
1943 Colored Waiting Room Sign, a display of cultural racism against any colored people including but not limited to: Native Americans, African Americans, Mulatto Americans, Chinese Americans, Japanese Americans, etc. Although not a colony anymore, the same racism exists as during the time it was a colony.

== Types and Forms ==
Volunteer tourism, in which international volunteers seek to aid poorer countries has been critiqued as a practice as teaching neocolonialism and racism among the international community. Proponents cite the power differences between the volunteers and indigenous folk, as well as interactions between the groups being decided on race and gender differences rather than other factors.

Colorblindness, not to be confused with the eye condition, has been critiqued as a practice of hiding racism by eradicating any comment about race from dialogue while still allowing racist sentiments to continue. In this manner, the effects of racism can be denied in legal court due to the non-use of any designated racist comments. Meanwhile, proponents of colorblindness maintain its use in preventing racist beliefs as a different explanation or perspective must be used instead of an overtly racist one.

Increasing needs of investments, as the powerful continue to prevent the poor from learning and moving up in station, there becomes more necessity for foreign investments to aid necessary maintains national functions and to fill in the gaps via imports of what is not made in country. This prevents internal businesses from profiting when imports can be made cheaper and sold via the distribution of the already rich.

== Literature ==
Marlon James' A Brief History of Seven Killings is a critique of neocolonialism in Jamaica after the assassination attempts on Bob Marley.
