= American studies in the United Kingdom =

Academic discipline taught at some British universities

American studies as an academic discipline is taught at some British universities and incorporated in several school subjects, such as history, politics, and literature. While the United States of America is the focus of most study, American Studies can also include the study of all the Americas, including South America and Canada. The methods of study are interdisciplinary, and students and researchers come from many fields, including anthropology, cultural studies, history, literature, film studies, gender studies and economics. Because of Britain's long association with the Americas, there is also a history of comment and analysis of the geography, culture and peoples of America, from Sir Walter Raleigh and Charles Dickens to Rudyard Kipling and Alistair Cooke.

American Studies in Britain is closely related to the discipline in America, and multiple degree programs also involve a period of study in the U.S. or Canada, ranging in time from a month to an academic year. However, an 'outsider's' view of a foreign culture, a variety of intellectual trends, such as the Birmingham school of cultural studies, and institutional arrangements often lead to a different approach to that pursued in the U.S. The support of the U.S. Embassy and other official U.S. bodies and awards also shows that American Studies has also been used to promote closer ties and greater understanding between the two countries.

== History of American Studies in Britain ==
Because of Britain's involvement in North America, American Studies has a long history as an activity in British Higher Education. This history has given American Studies in Britain a different flavour from that pursued in the U.S. The earliest accounts of the British colonization and exploration of North America may be considered as the first contributions to this field, which now incorporates the output of the work of many university departments, scholarly journals, and independent scholars. Many libraries, museums, and archives in the United Kingdom also support such work.

=== The British Association for American Studies ===
American Studies as an academic course of study is generally considered to have begun in the U.S. in the late 1930s, at a time when little research or study was undertaken in Britain. During World War II, the British government encouraged the study of America and the American government began to see the need to support American Studies abroad during the Cold War, in the belief that "the more people knew about the United States, the more they would come to admire its political and economic values, and its foreign policy". In the early 1950s, the Rockefeller Foundation and the United States Education Commission (USEC) organised a series of Anglo-American conferences, which became known as the 'Fulbright Conferences' after the Fulbright Act of 1946. The British Association for American Studies (BAAS) was founded at the fourth conference in 1955; many of its members were influenced by the experiences of exchange programmes with the United States, such as the Commonwealth Fellowships, and contacts with Rhodes Scholars, and realised that much American culture and literature was unknown or misunderstood. The impetus to form the Association came from the Cultural Attaché at the U.S. Embassy in London, Dick Taylor, who wrote to the members of the eventual founding committee that he knew of "concrete interest" from an unnamed American foundation that wished to support the founding of an American Studies association. Taylor also proposed the founding of a center for American Studies at Ditchley Park, with an American school and conference center along the lines of the British School at Athens. The fledgling Association could not support this venture and, concerned with their independence from the U.S. State Department, unsuccessfully sought funding from the Rockefeller Foundation. Taylor's successor at the Embassy, Myron Koenig, offered a $20,000 grant to survey British library resources and $100,000 to establish the society. Membership fees provided a small income, and although BAAS accepted the grant for the library survey, they were able to decline the larger sum in the interests of intellectual and political independence. In 1956, the society received funding from the Rockefeller Foundation. BAAS has continued to provide a focus for American Studies in Britain, organizing a series of conferences and administrating various awards and funds for research. In recent years, BAAS has expanded its activities significantly. From 2022 to 2025, the chair was Lydia Plath, succeeded in 2025 by Michael Collins. The association now publishes the Journal of American Studies, American Studies in Britain, US Studies Online, BAAS Paperbacks, and Resources for American Studies. In 2020, BAAS established the Teaching American Studies Network (TASN), which supports innovation in teaching, outreach to schools, and undergraduate engagement.

=== Political influence ===
American Studies has always been influenced to some degree by contemporary politics. For example, the Special relationship between the two countries has contributed to a long tradition of scholarly exchange and support from U.S. organizations, such as the United States Department of State for the study of America in Britain. During World War II, The British Government also sought to "counter the Hollywood image of America as a land of violence and corruption by a vigorous campaign to develop American studies". As noted above, the development of the British university system and interest in the U.S. as a result of the Cold War and increasingly dominant U.S. popular culture led to the development of several American Studies courses at institutions including the universities of Keele and East Anglia.

More recently, in 2004 the Guardian columnist, Polly Toynbee suggested in an article revealingly called "A degree in bullying and self-interest? No thanks" that the Iraq war and the so-called "War on Terror" had led to a positive resistance to American Studies. Others, such as Shelley Fisher Fishkin argued that American Studies needs more transnational perspectives and that the U.S.'s engagement with the world demands more, not less, study.

=== Expansion, contraction and consolidation ===
University growth allowed the expansion of American Studies in Britain during the 1960s and 1970s. By the 1980s, the European Association for American Studies estimated that there were at least two thousand Americanists employed in Britain and the Continent. Most major British universities could boast a historian of the U.S. or a literature specialist. American Studieshttps://studyabroad-consultancy.com/about-us/ also began to extend its range, incorporating Film Studies and the newer fields of Cultural and Gender Studies. Americanists also began to seek the 'meaning of America' outside the traditional areas of political institutions and dominant social class but in marginalized groups. During the 1980s, as Pells comments, the canon became 'contemporary, ethnic, and feminist'. The decade also witnessed a tranche of retirements from the profession, which, because of financial constraints on universities, were not replaced. Several key figures, such as Marcus Cunliffe, left Britain for American university posts. By the early 1990s, some American Studies departments were closed.

The end of the Cold War in the late 1980s marked a revival in interest in the remaining superpower, and student numbers rose, along with the number of professors. Most notable was the Rothermere Centre at Oxford (established 2001.) This revival was generally maintained until the controversial election of Bush in 2000, then 9/11, the subsequent "war on terror" and the invasion of Iraq which put together encouraged a critical attitude to the United States in the public sphere which eventually had a negative effect on recruitment and caused a number of programmes to close (for instance at Reading) or amalgamate with English, History or other departments (see above reference to Polly Toynbee.)

With the election of Barack Obama in 2008 sparking renewed interest in the United States and its history and culture, the British Association for American Studies reported increasing demand for American-themed modules in many undergraduate degree programmes and a steady rise in applications to American Studies courses. That trend was exemplified when, in 2012, the announcement was made by Northumbria University of the most ambitious new initiative in American Studies for more than a generation, spearheaded by Brian Ward, former professor of American Studies at the University of Manchester. The first cohort of American Studies undergraduates was admitted to Northumbria in September 2013.

== Key figures and works ==
=== Historians and named chairs ===
- 1922, Harold Vyvyan Harmsworth Chair in American History, The Queen's College, Oxford, intended for visiting American scholars.
- 1930, Commonwealth Professorship in American History, University of London.
- Harold Laski, historian and political scientist, published The American Democracy in 1948, which lamented Europe's 'absurd and willful ignorance of American institutions and culture'
- D. W. Brogan, The American Character, 1944.
- Peter J. Parish
- Esmond Wright.

=== Literary critics ===
- Marcus Cunliffe, The Literature of the United States (1954).
- Professor Dennis Welland (1919–2002). Following a 12-month Rockefeller scholarship to the University of Minnesota, he began one of the first American Studies courses at the University of Nottingham in 1953. He helped to found the British Association of American Studies and acted as its first treasurer, secretary, and chair (1980–83). Welland was the founding editor of the Journal of American Studies (1976). His publications include Arthur Miller (1961), Twain in England (1978), and The Life and Times of Mark Twain (1991).
- Malcolm Bradbury, who suggested that America offered an escape from the 'constraining, class-oriented, provincial embrace' of Britain.
- Eric Knowle William Mottram (1924–1995) (Professor of English and American Literature, King's College, London).

=== Anthropologists ===
- Geoffrey Gorer, The American People (1948).

=== Journalists and writers ===
Thomas Paine, William Cobbett, Charles Dickens, Anthony Trollope, Rudyard Kipling, Alistair Cooke and Christopher Hitchens, have written about the political and cultural differences between Britain and America.

=== Publishers ===
- Sheldon Meyer (1926–2006), Oxford University Press (New York). Meyer published influential American studies works such as C. Vann Woodward, The Strange Career of Jim Crow (on segregation in the South), Robert Toll, Blacking Up (a study of blackface minstrelsy), Nathan Huggin's study of the Harlem Renaissance, Edmund Wilson, Patriotic Gore (American Civil War literature), James M. McPherson, Battle Cry of Freedom, 1988 (Civil War). He co-edited, with C. Vann Woodward, the Oxford History of the United States. Meyer also commissioned works on American jazz.

=== U.S. institutional support ===
The Fulbright Program, which began in 1948, has been the backbone of many scholarly exchanges between Britain and the United States

== Schools and movements ==
As a heterodox discipline, American Studies incorporates many fields, from literature to international relations. Various schools, such as that of the Myth and Symbol approach have strongly influenced research. Although these approaches can be seen in [American Studies] in the U.S. and elsewhere, there have been distinctive British contributions.

=== Birmingham School ===
The Centre for Contemporary Cultural Studies was a research center at the University of Birmingham. It was founded in 1964 by Richard Hoggart, its first director. Its object of study was the then-new field of Cultural Studies and it soon became known as the Birmingham School. Although no clear method emerged, the influence of Marxism and other theories, such as post-structuralism informed a politically engaged, sophisticated analysis of contemporary society. Its members included Jorge Larrain, the Chilean sociologist and cultural historian, author of Identity and Modernity in Latin America. The School has influenced many Area Studies scholars, including American Studies specialists.

== American Studies at GCSE and A-Level ==
O-levels and A-levels (AS/A2) in American studies have not been offered since the introduction of GCSEs and the UK National Curriculum however, American Studies is a component of history and politics A-level curricula whilst, the civil rights movement is studied as a unit as part of GCSE History.

== American Studies programmes at UK universities and higher education institutions ==
A list of institutions can be found at the Eccles Centre for American Studies website. Currently (2008) 37 institutions offer an American Studies degree.

== American Studies societies and centers in the UK ==
- British Association for American Studies
- Eccles Centre for American Studies at the British Library
- The Institute of North American Studies at King's College London
  - "The Institute of North American Studies at King's College London offers versatile and diverse academic programmes for the study of the cultures, societies, and arts of the United States and the Americas at graduate levels. It is the only Institute of its kind at the University of London and one of the leading centers in its field in the country. Though established in 2010, in fact, the institute draws upon a long tradition of teaching American culture and literature at King's, a tradition that goes back to the early sixties when the College appointed the very first full-time lecturer in American Literature in the country."
- Cunliffe Centre for the Study of the American South at University of Sussex
  - "Based in the American Studies Department at the University of Sussex, the Cunliffe Centre offers a concentration of scholars of the history of the South unparalleled anywhere outside the United States. The principal purpose of the Cunliffe Centre is to build upon this strength by enhancing research networks between scholars in the United Kingdom, Europe, and the United States, and to provide channels for the transfer of knowledge in the field to the broader public."
- Centre for American Studies at University of Leicester
  - "Voted in the "Top 2" by The Times, The Guardian, and The Independent in 2008, the Centre for American Studies at Leicester is firmly established as one of the UK's most important providers of American Studies degrees."
- Institute for the Study of the Americas at the School of Advanced Study, University of London
  - "The Institute for the Study of the Americas promotes, coordinates and provides a focus for research and postgraduate teaching on the Americas – Canada, the US, Latin America, and the Caribbean – in the University of London"
- School of American & Canadian Studies at University of Nottingham
  - "The School of American and Canadian Studies – which includes the Institute of Film and Television Studies – is the only Five Star Research School in its subject area and is the largest undergraduate and postgraduate center for American Studies in the country. It has a thriving programme at all levels and a teaching and research culture of the highest quality."
- The American Studies Centre at Liverpool John Moores University
  - The Centre provides an educational service to students, teachers, and the general public in the UK on all aspects of American culture. The ASRC is staffed by student research assistants under the directorship of Dr Bella Adams. The ARNet website is fundamental to the Centre's educational service, allowing it to disseminate information about American Studies courses, conferences, and events. ARNet also provides an annotated list of links to American Studies resources on the internet, covering a range of topics from the environment and education to online publications. ARNet also has its own online publication American Studies Today Online, which features scholarly articles and book reviews. American Studies Today is published annually in hard copy form and is free to subscribers and contributors. American Studies Today Online is also free and features additional material, including longer articles and 'Letters from America.'
- School of American Studies at Richmond University
  - As the UK's only American studies programme based in an American Liberal Arts university, Richmond's BA in American Studies aims to develop an understanding of the United States of America from an international perspective. The programme enables students to take courses in American history, politics, and foreign policy alongside courses on film, literature, popular music, globalisation and contemporary popular culture – sharing courses with students majoring in International Relations, Politics, History, Communications, Journalism, and other disciplines. Students studying American Studies will have the opportunity to benefit from the numerous exchange possibilities with universities and colleges in the United States and Canada.
- Rothermere American Institute, University of Oxford
  - "The Rothermere American Institute, which was opened on 25 May 2001 by former US President Bill Clinton, is an international center of excellence dedicated to the interdisciplinary and comparative study of the United States. Bringing together scholars, intellectuals, policy-makers, and public figures from around the world, the Rothermere American Institute will promote a greater public and academic understanding of the history, culture, and politics of the United States. The newly built institute also hosts the finest library of Americana to be found outside the USA."
- The Institute for the Study of the Americas, School of Advanced Study, arranges a series of events and conferences in London

== Hard to find sources for American Studies in the UK ==
Although many collections of materials can be located through the online or automated catalogs of archives and libraries, many resources are not listed in this fashion and may be difficult to locate.

=== Microform collections ===
- Early American Imprints is held by several libraries, including the British Library, the National Library of Scotland, the University of Cambridge Library and the Vere Harmsworth Library in Oxford. Its contents are now listed through COPAC.
- A large body of BAAS material has been selected and microfilmed in the series British Records relating to America, sponsored by BAAS and published by Microform Ltd

=== Manuscript collections ===
- The British Library's Department of Manuscripts holds many collections related to the early history of America and the American Revolution, as does the National Archives (UK)
- Records of the British Association for American Studies at Birmingham University Information Services. A handlist is available online.

=== Newspaper collections ===
Many American newspapers are available in the United Kingdom, either in their original format or in microform. American newspapers often contain reports of events in Britain and details of trans-atlantic relations. A database can be found on the BAAS newspaper database.

A digital collection of Historical American Newspapers is held by the British Library, which complements the extensive paper and microform collections; important collections are also held by the National Library of Scotland.

=== Digital collections ===
United States Congressional Serial Set is part of Readex's Archive of Americana. It is held at the British Library and the University of Oxford. The University of Sussex holds the full set of the Archive of Americana.

== See also ==
- Advanced Level (UK)
- American Studies
- Area Studies
- Cultural Studies

== Sources ==
- L. Billington, "Pioneering American Studies: Ten Years of the Bulletin, 1956–1966", Journal of American Studies, 42 (2008) 2, 167–185.
- "American History in Schools", BAAS Newsletter, 81, Winter, 1999
- P. Thompson, Cassell's Dictionary of American History, Cassell, 2000.
