= Academic imperialism =

Unequal relation between academics

Academic imperialism is an unequal relationship between groups or disciplines of academic study, such that one dominates others, consuming them or leaving them ignored. Early theories of academic imperialism date to the 1960s.

== Definitions ==
Academic imperialism has been defined either in the context of certain disciplines or subdisciplines as oppressing others or (more often) as part of political imperialism that has resulted in inequality between academia in the First World (the West) and Third World.

=== Within disciplines ===
In the intradisciplinary context, an example of imperialistic behavior was the dismissive attitude of the 1920s-1930s adherents of behavioral psychology in the United States towards non-behavioral psychologists.

=== Internationally ===
In the international context, academic imperialism began in the colonial period when the colonial powers designed and implemented a system of academia in their colonial territories. C. K. Raju claims academic imperialism emerged thanks to racism among native colonial elites. Academic imperialism is blamed for "tutelage, conformity, secondary role of dominated intellectuals and scholars, rationalization of the civilizing mission, and the inferior talent of scholars from the home country specializing in studies of the colony." In the modern postcolonial era, academic imperialism has transformed itself into a more indirect form of control, based on Western monopoly on the flow of information in the world of academia. Syed Farid Alatas calls this "academic neo-colonialism".

== Relation to academic dependency ==
International academic imperialism generates academic dependency, or the dependency of non-Western scholars on Western academia. In non-Western countries, science is still dependent on institutions and ideas of Western science, which are often transplanted from Western countries.

Syed Farid Alatas lists the following six aspects of academic dependency:

- Dependence on ideas;
- Dependence on the media of ideas;
- Dependence on the technology of education;
- Dependence on aid for research as well as teaching;
- Dependence on investment in education;
- Dependence of Third World social scientists on demand in the West for their skills.

Specific examples of academic dependency include the fact that most major journals are based in the Western countries and carry works by scholars located at Western universities; and that scholars in the Western countries study the entire world, whereas scholars in the non-Western countries focus on their own societies. Another example is the dominance of English language in the world of international academia.

== See also ==
- Human capital flight
