= American studies =

Interdisciplinary academic field

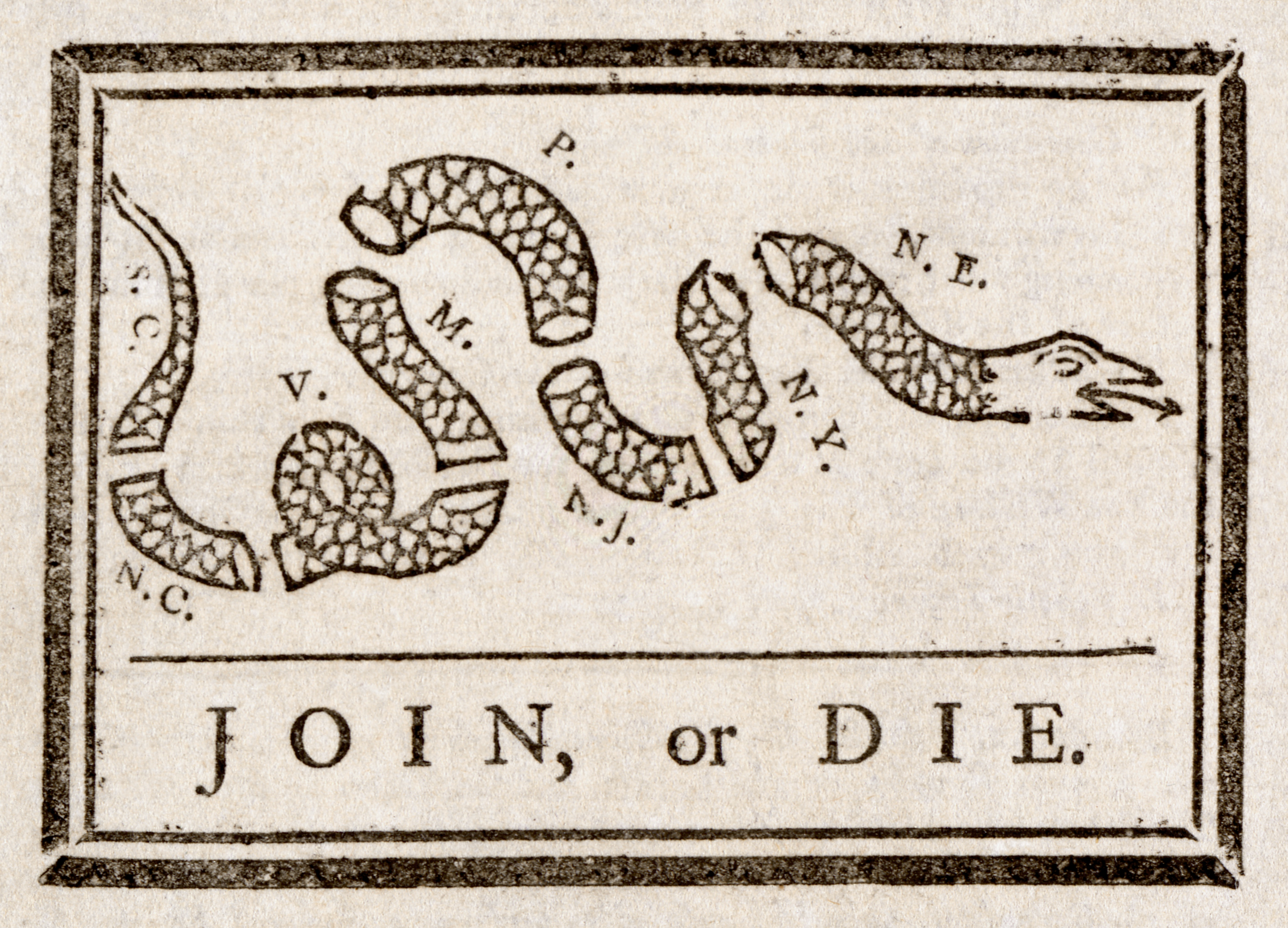
Benjamin Franklin - Join or Die "This political cartoon...originally appeared during the French and Indian War, but was recycled to encourage the American colonies to join the Albany Plan for Union."

American studies or American civilization is an interdisciplinary field of scholarship that examines American literature, history, society, and culture. It traditionally incorporates American historiography, literary criticism, and critical theory.

Scholarship in American studies focuses on the United States and its impact on human history. It has also broadened to include Atlantic history and Americans' interactions with countries across the globe. Subjects studied within the field are varied, but often examine the literary themes, histories of American communities, ideologies, or cultural productions. Examples might include topics in American social movements, literature, media, tourism, folklore, and intellectual history.

Fields studying specific American ethnic or racial groups are considered to be both independent of and included within the broader American studies discipline. This includes African American studies, Asian American studies, Latino studies, Native American studies, and others.

== Founding notions ==
Vernon Louis Parrington is often cited as the founder of American studies for his three-volume Main Currents in American Thought, which combines the methodologies of literary criticism and historical research; it won the 1928 Pulitzer Prize. In the introduction to Main Currents in American Thought, Parrington described his field:

I have undertaken to give some account of the genesis and development in American letters of certain germinal ideas that have come to be reckoned traditionally American—how they came into being here, how they were opposed, and what influence they have exerted in determining the form and scope of our characteristic ideals and institutions. In pursuing such a task, I have chosen to follow the broad path of our political, economic, and social development, rather than the narrower belletristic.

— Vernon Louis Parrington, Main Currents In American Thought Volume One 1620-1800 The Colonial Mind

The "broad path" that Parrington describes formed a scholastic course of study for Henry Nash Smith, who received a PhD from Harvard's interdisciplinary program in history and American civilization in 1940, setting an academic precedent for present-day American studies programs.

The first signature methodology of American studies was the "myth and symbol" approach, developed in such foundational texts as Henry Nash Smith's Virgin Land in 1950, John William Ward's Andrew Jackson: Symbol for an Age in 1955 and Leo Marx's The Machine in the Garden in 1964. Myth and symbol scholars claimed to find certain recurring themes throughout American texts that served to illuminate a unique American culture. Later scholars such as Annette Kolodny and Alan Trachtenberg re-imagined the myth and symbol approach in light of multicultural studies.

Beginning in the 1960s and 1970s, these earlier approaches were criticized for continuing to promote the idea of American exceptionalism—the notion that the US has had a special mission and virtue that makes it unique among nations. Several generations of American studies scholars moved away from purely ethnocentric views, emphasizing transnational issues surrounding race, ethnicity, gender and sexuality, among other topics. But recent studies critique the exceptionalist nature of the transnational turn. "The transnational turn has positioned American Studies in a nationalist rut", observes Jeffrey Herlihy-Mera, in After American Studies: Rethinking the Legacies of Transnational Exceptionalism:

In these transnational turns ... the unhyphenated-American phenomenon tends to have colonial characteristics: English-language texts and their authors are promoted as representative; a piece of cultural material may be understood as unhyphenated—and thus archetypal—only when authors meet certain demographic criteria; any deviation from these demographic or cultural prescriptions are subordinated to hyphenated status.

— Jeffrey Herlihy-Mera, After American Studies: Rethinking the Legacies of Transnational Exceptionalism

Institutionally, in the last decade the American Studies Association has reflected the interdisciplinary nature of the field, creating strong connections to ethnic studies, gender studies, cultural studies and post- or de-colonial studies. Environmental perspectives, in ascendance in related fields, such as literature and history, have not penetrated the mainstream of American studies scholarship. A major theme of the field in recent years has been internationalization—the recognition that much vital scholarship about the US and its relations to the wider global community has been and is being produced outside the United States.

== Debate on use of the term American ==
Until the mid-2000s, the use of American for this multidisciplinary field was widely defended. In 1998, Janice Radway argued, "Does the perpetuation of the particular name, American, in the title of the field ... support the notion that such a whole exists even in the face of powerful work that tends to question its presumed coherence? Does the field need to be reconfigured conceptually?" She concluded, "the name American studies will have to be retained." In 2001, Wai Chee Dimmock argued that the field "is largely founded on this fateful adjective. [American] governs the domain of inquiry we construct, the range of questions we entertain, the kind of evidence we take as significant. The very professionalism of the field rests on the integrity and the legitimacy of this founding concept." In 2002, Heinz Ickstadt argued that American studies "should accept its name as its limitation and its boundary." In 2006, Dimmock affirmed that the field "does stand to be classified apart, as a nameable and adducible unit."

More recently, scholars have questioned American as a categorizing term. "In consideration of the limitations of conventional terms," Jeffrey Herlihy-Mera argued in 2018, instead of American, terms like "spaces claimed by the political body" and "residents of spaces claimed by the political body" would offer a "more sensitive and attuned description ... of the regions, critical artifacts, communities, and individuals in question, one that is less charged with the ambiguities and colonial ties that weigh down the traditional disciplinary nomenclatures." In "the interests of justice and along the lines most suitable to our emergent age," argued Markha Valenta in 2017, scholars should consider "abandoning America as the field identifier."

== Imperial American studies ==
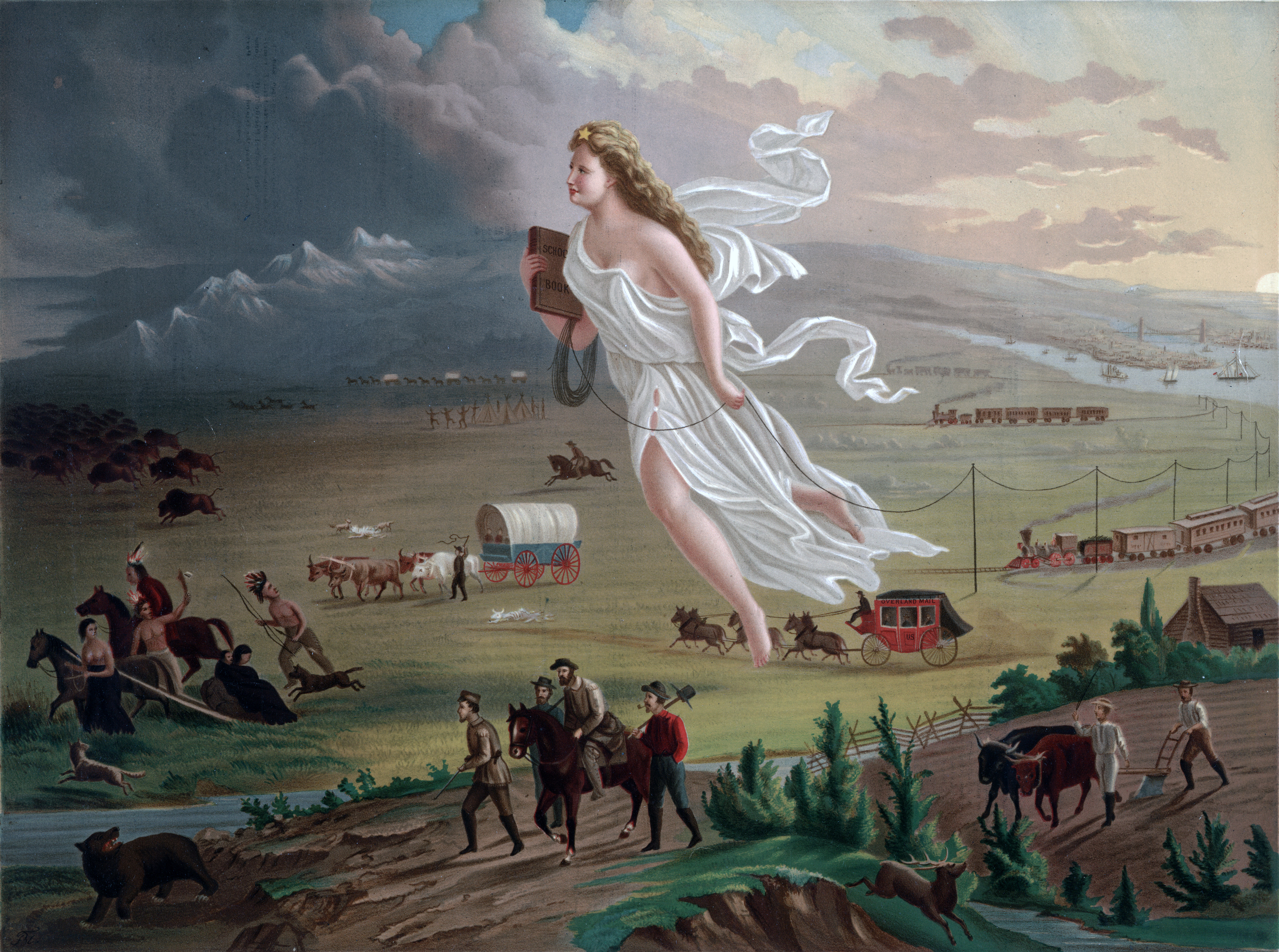
American Progress an oil painting (Q56676227) by John Gast (Q1700176) depicting Manifest Destiny (Q474184).

"One of the central themes of American historiography", argued William Appleman Williams, "is that there is no American Empire". Another central theme is that America is a world power continuously and steadily expanding since 1890 and extending varying degrees of American sovereignty throughout the world. Whatever euphemisms are used to describe the American Empire, it exists.

According to American Studies Association president Janice Radway, one of the main problems has been that American Studies consistently tilted towards "Imperial American Studies." The field consistently becomes politicized, and its representatives find themselves responsible for US foreign policy and for globalization suspected to benefit US citizens disproportionately. The imperial tilt increased following the "unipolar moment" in 1991. The field reacted with a "Transnational Turn" initiated by Amy Kaplan in 1993. Paul Giles joined the campaign with a proposal to elevate the field from the aged patriotic empire-building to the increasingly transnational networks of the 1990s. The volume of scholarship edited by Kaplan inspired a 1998 conference on the theme "American Studies and the Question of Empire." Opening the conference, Radway magnified the anti-imperial push and suggested erasing the adjective "American" from "American Studies" because of the association between "American" and "Imperial."

Frank Kelleter, the chair of the American Studies at the University of Göttingen, writing in the Review of International American Studies, criticized the Transnational Turn in 2007 as "an antipode to US state power". Speaking transnationally became identified with speaking in a counter-hegemonic way. He claimed the Transnational Turn prevents understanding US imperialism and the manifestations of non-US imperialisms in their respective fields. He considered outlining why and how US imperialism is more successful and power than most pre-American forms of dominance as an integral part of American Studies. According to Kelleter, the Transnational Turn is based on wishful thinking caused by US hegemony:

As if hoping to theorize the US out of existence, they dissolve America's truly exceptional global position (Q464148) within any transnational constellation that comes in handy. In this manner, theory promises to do what is impossible to achieve in practice: to rid the world of US power.

In 2026 the Progressive Policy Institute published a report titled The Distortion of American Studies: How the Field’s Leading Journal Has Embraced a Worldview as Slanted as Donald Trump’s with the central claim being that American Studies is too negative. The authors are Richard Kahlenberg, the Director of Housing Policy at the Progressive Policy Institute, and Lief Lin, a Policy Analyst at the Progressive Policy Institute. They looked at American Quarterly articles to see if the academic field is spreading misinformation by not having enough neutral or positive articles.

This appendix includes description of all 96 essays in American Quarterly regular issues for the years 2022-2024, including the month and year the article was published; the article title; the coding we gave the article (critical, neutral or positive); its critique categories (racism, sexism, etc.); its abstract (when provided); and at least one representative quotation

— Richard D. Kahlenberg, Lief Lin, The Distortion of American Studies: How the Field’s Leading Journal Has Embraced a Worldview as Slanted as Donald Trump’s, VI. Appendix

They use Donald Trump as an equivalent example for misinformation, "President Donald Trump has notoriously sought to erase the negative components of American history...On other pages, statements on the historic struggle of Black Americans for their rights were cut or softened.”

Their assessment has been criticized by other members of the American Studies field. In an article in Public Books titled Who Benefits from Distorting American Studies?, Iván Chaar López, Associate Professor in American Studies at The University of Texas at Austin, and Erin McElroy, Associate Professor in Geography at the University of Washington, respond to the claims made in the report. They state the report is "based only on selective and superficial readings" of the field's top journal without "do[ing] the hard work of examining the soundness of the claims made [by American studies scholars] about US history and society." Instead, the authors continue, the report relies on rigid interpretations of the past. Another claim examined is how criticism against American Studies is occurring while there is government pressure to silence the truth.

As Kahlenberg and Lin police what can be written and taught about the past and present US, elected and government officials at the federal and state levels work on silencing uncomfortable yet profound truths.

— Iván Chaar López and Erin McElroy, Who Benefits from Distorting American Studies?

Chaar López and McElroy also took issue with the intent behind Progressive Policy Institute's publishing of the article. They claim this push for accuracy is really about pushing the theory of American Exceptionalism.

In placing the US nation as the central character, as the “study” and many conservative thinkers insist, its peoples are mere plot devices to explain its grandeur. Rather than understand how people live, what they endure, with what, and under what conditions, these thinkers apply a rigid frame that cuts out whatever may trouble the nation’s exceptionalism and persistent improvement. In other words, they imply there is only one objective truth about the past.

— Iván Chaar López and Erin McElroy, Who Benefits from Distorting American Studies?

Scholars have examined how cultural imperialism occurs within the US borders. Jeffrey Herlihy-Mera described the phenomenon as an attempt to transition the "cultural symbols of the invading communities from 'foreign' to 'natural,' 'domestic,'" through three discrete and sequential phases:

People in new space	Objective
(1) Merchants Also termed "explorers" e.g., Lewis and Clark	Encounter resources E.g., minerals, trade routes, spices, furs, communities to tax or conscript, fertile agricultural zones, strategic geography, etc.
(2) Military An invasion force	Control resources Implement martial law so that the metropolitan may exploit resources; establish "Fort" cities, e.g., Fort Lauderdale, Fort Worth etc. that facilitate metropolitan settlement.
(3) Politicians Socialize the space into a new province of the metropolitan	Social engineering Acculturize the space into a region of the metropolitan through saturation of symbol, legend, and myth. Establish laws and norms that promote the metropolitan (invading system) as dominant culture and prohibit or criminalize other systems; offer citizenship to conquered peoples in exchange for submission to metropolitan cultural norms and abandonment of original or other (in the case of immigrants) social tendencies.

(Herlihy-Mera, Jeffrey. 2018. After American Studies: Rethinking the Legacies of Transnational Exceptionalism. Routledge. p. 24)

While the third phase continues "in perpetuity", the imperial appropriation tends to be "gradual, contested (and continues to be contested), and is by nature incomplete." The Americanization of the continent has been described as a cultural engineering project that strives to "isolate residents within constructed spheres of symbols" such that they (eventually, in some cases after several generations) abandon other cultures and identify with the new symbols. "The broader intended outcome of these interventions might be described as a common recognition of possession of the land itself."

== Outside the United States ==
European centers for American studies include the British Association for American Studies, the Center for American Studies in Brussels, Belgium, and most notably the John F. Kennedy-Institute for North American Studies in Berlin, Germany. Other centers for American studies in Germany include the Bavarian America-Academy, LMU Munich, the Heidelberg Center for American Studies (HCA) and the Center for North American Studies (Zentrum für Nordamerikaforschung or ZENAF) at Goethe University Frankfurt. Graduate studies in the field of North American studies can also be undertaken at the University of Cologne, which works together in joint partnership with the North American studies program at the University of Bonn. American Studies Leipzig at Leipzig University is a center for American studies on the territory of former East Germany. Founded in 1992, the Center for American Studies at the University of Southern Denmark now offers a graduate program in American studies. In the Netherlands the University of Groningen and the Radboud Universiteit Nijmegen offer a complete undergraduate and graduate program in American studies. The University of Amsterdam, Leiden University, and Utrecht University only offer a graduate program in American studies. Both the University of Sussex and the University of Nottingham in England offer both a number of postgraduate and undergraduate programs. In Sweden, the Swedish Institute for North American Studies at Uppsala University offers a minor in American studies. In Slovakia, the University of Presov and Pavol Jozef Safarik University offer a complete undergraduate and graduate program in American studies combined with British studies. The Eccles Centre for American Studies at the British Library also offers a range of events and fellowships, as well as promoting the American collections held at the British Library. Russia's main center for American studies is the Institute for US and Canadian Studies of the Russian Academy of Sciences.

In the Middle East, the oldest American Studies program is the American Studies Center at the University of Bahrain in Sakhir, which was founded in 1998. An American studies program is offered at the University of Tehran within the Faculty of World Studies.

In Oceania, the University of Canterbury in Christchurch New Zealand operated a full undergraduate and graduate American studies program until 2012, and in Australia, an undergraduate major in American Studies and a postgraduate specialisation in American Foreign Policy is run by the United States Studies Centre at the University of Sydney.

In Canada, the University of Alberta has the Alberta Institute for American Studies. The University of Western Ontario has a Centre for American Studies that has both an undergraduate and master's program in American studies, with specializations at the graduate level in American Cultural Studies, and Canadian-American Relations. York University offers an undergraduate program in United States Studies.

American studies centers in China include the American Studies Center (Beijing Foreign Studies University) in 1979, the Institute of American Studies (Chinese Academy of Social Science) in 1981, Center for American Studies (Fudan University) in 1985, American Studies Center (Peking University) in 1980, Center for American Studies (Tongji University), American Studies Center (Sichuan University) in 1985, Johns Hopkins University-Nanjing University Center for Chinese and American Studies in 1986, American Social and Cultural Studies Center (China Foreign Affairs University) and Center for American Studies (East China Normal University) in 2004. These centers do not have undergraduate programs. Based on the requirement of the curriculum setup of the China Department of Education, these centers only have graduate programs. In addition, there are also scholarly journals, such as American Studies Quarterly and Fudan American Review.

In the Republic of Korea, Sogang University (Seoul, Korea) is the sole institution that offers regular degree program both in bachelor (BA) and master (MA) degree in American studies, named American culture. The American culture division is run by the Department of English along with English literature and linguistics. Keimyung University (Daegu, Korea), Hansung University (Seoul, Korea), Pyeongtaek University (Pyeongtaek, Gyeonggi-do, Korea), Kyunghee University (Yongin, Gyonggi-do, Korea) also provide a major in American studies. Seoul National University (Seoul, Korea) and Yonsei University (Seoul, Korea) offers undergraduate interdisciplinary courses in American studies. The American Studies Association of Korea (ASAK) is one of the country's foremost research associations devoted to the interdisciplinary study of American culture and society within the Korean context.

== International American Studies Association ==
Founded at Triangolo lariano, Italy, in 2000, the International American Studies Association has held World Congresses at Leyden (2003), Ottawa (2005), Lisbon (2007), Beijing (2009), Rio de Janeiro (2011), The Sixth World Congress of IASA at Szczecin, Poland, August 3–6, 2013, and Alcalá de Henares, Madrid (2019). The IASA is the only worldwide, independent, non-governmental association for Americanists. Furthering the international exchange of ideas and information among scholars from all nations and various disciplines who study and teach America regionally, hemispherically, nationally, and transnationally, IASA is registered in the Netherlands as a non-profit, international, educational organization with members in more than forty countries around the world.

== Associations and scholarly journals ==
The American Studies Association was founded in 1950. It publishes American Quarterly, which has been the primary outlet of American studies scholarship since 1949. The second-largest American studies journal, American Studies, is sponsored by the Mid-America American Studies Association, University of Kansas, and University of Minnesota. Today there are 55 American studies journals in 25 countries.

== See also ==
- American Literature (academic discipline)
- American Studies in Germany
- American studies in the United Kingdom
- Cultural studies
- High School of American Studies at Lehman College
- Outline of academic disciplines
- Public humanities
