= C. K. Raju =

Indian physicist

C. K. Raju (born 7 March 1954) is an Indian computer scientist, statistician, mathematician, and physicist. He also publishes about the history and philosophy of mathematics, including the development of mathematical ideas in India and the relationship between Indian and Western mathematical traditions. He was a contributor to the first Indian supercomputer, PARAM.

== Early life ==
Raju was born on 7 March 1954 in Gwalior, Madhya Pradesh, India. He obtained a B.Sc. degree from the Institute of Science, Mumbai in 1973, an M.Sc. from the University of Mumbai in 1975, and a Ph.D. from the Indian Statistical Institute in 1980.

== Career ==
During the early 1980s, Raju was a faculty member at the Department of Statistics at the University of Pune. He was a contributor to the first Indian supercomputer, PARAM (1988–91). He has also engaged in amateur historical research, including claiming that the Jesuits brought calculus to Europe from India. Certain elements of calculus were developed in India as well as other regions of the world centuries before the notion of calculus was formalized in Europe in the 17th century, but Indian scholars did not formulate a systematic theory of differentiation and integration and there is no direct evidence of their results being transmitted outside Kerala. Raju has also controversially claimed that the Western philosophy of science, including its aspects that pertain to time and the nature of mathematical proof, are rooted in the theocratic needs of the Roman Catholic Church.

Raju built on E. T. Whittaker's controversial claim that Albert Einstein's theories of special and general relativity relied on the earlier work of Henri Poincaré. Raju claimed that they were "remarkably similar" and that Poincaré had published every aspect of special relativity in papers between 1898 and 1905. He also went further, claiming that Einstein's claimed failure to recognize an asserted need for functional differential equations constituted a mistake that underlies subsequent relativistic physics (a claim with which the broader scientific community widely disagrees), and proposed that relativistic physics be reformulated using functional differential equations. He also introduced "retarded gravitation theory", a theory of gravitation which implies that gravity functions based on a value of distance that propagates through space across time rather than the instantaneous distance.

Raju's claims regarding the historical origins of calculus, the origins and functionality of the Western philosophy of science, the priority of Einstein's discovery of special and general relativity versus Poincaré, the mathematical formulation of Einstein's theories, and the retarded gravitation theory are all widely viewed by the scientific community at large as unsupported, unsupportable, or both.

== Bibliography ==
- Raju, C.K. (1994). Time: Towards a Consistent Theory. Kluwer Academic. ISBN 978-0-7923-3103-2.
- Raju, C.K. (2003). The Eleven Pictures of Time. Sage. ISBN 978-0-7619-9624-8.
- Raju, C. K. (2007). Cultural Foundations of Mathematics: The nature of mathematical proof and the transmission of the calculus from India to Europe in the 16th c. CE. Pearson Longman. ISBN 978-81-317-0871-2.
- Raju, C. K. (2009). Is Science Western in Origin?. Multiversity and Citizens International. ASIN B0030EG1FQ.
- Raju, C. K. (2013). Euclid and Jesus: How and why the church changed mathematics and Christianity across two religious wars. Multiversity and Citizens International. ISBN 978-983-3046-17-1.
