= British Association for American Studies =

Learned society

- Abbreviation: BAAS
- Formation: 1955
- Type: Learned society
- Purpose: Promotes the study of American studies.
- Location: United Kingdom
- Fields: American studies
- Publication: Journal of American Studies, American Studies in Britain, US Studies Online, BAAS Paperbacks, Resources for American Studies
- Website: www.baas.ac.uk

The British Association for American Studies is a learned society in the field of American studies. It was founded in 1955. It produces the Journal of American Studies, American Studies in Britain, US Studies Online, BAAS Paperbacks, and Resources for American Studies.

It has produced many of its own publications, as well as many in partnership with Cambridge University Press, Edinburgh University Press, and Microform Academic Publishers.

== BAAS Chairs past and present ==
- Frank Thistlethwaite 1955–59
- Herbert Nicholas 1959–62
- Marcus Cunliffe 1962–65
- Esmond Wright 1965–68
- Maldwyn Jones 1968–71
- George Shepperson 1971–74
- Harry Allen 1974–77
- Peter Parish 1977–80
- Dennis Welland 1980–83
- Charlotte Erickson 1983–86
- Howard Temperley 1986–89
- Bob Burchell 1989–92
- Richard King 1992–95
- Judie Newman 1995–98
- Philip Davies 1998–2004
- Simon Newman 2004–2007
- Heidi Macpherson 2007–2010
- Martin Halliwell 2010–2013
- Susan Currell 2013–2016
- Brian Ward 2016–2019
- Cara Rodway 2019–2022
- Lydia Plath 2022- 2025
- Michael Collins 2025 -

== See also ==
- American studies in the United Kingdom
