= Journal of American Studies =

- Discipline: American studies
- Language: English
- Edited by: Sinéad Moynihan, Nick Witham

Publication details
- History: 1967–present
- Publisher: Cambridge University Press for the British Association for American Studies
- Frequency: Quarterly

Standard abbreviations
- ISO 4: J. Am. Stud.

Indexing
- ISSN: 0021-8758 (print); 1469-5154 (web)
- LCCN: 77009488
- JSTOR: jamerstud
- OCLC no.: 1799967

Links
- Journal homepage; Online access; Online archive

The Journal of American Studies is a quarterly peer-reviewed academic journal covering international perspectives on the history, literature, politics and culture of the United States. It includes a book review section. Though academic in nature, the journal is intended also for general readers with an interest in the United States. It was established in 1967 with Dennis Welland (University of Manchester) as editor-in-chief. The current editors are Sinéad Moynihan (University of Exeter) and Nick Witham (University College London).

The journal is an official journal of the British Association for American Studies and is published by Cambridge University Press.

== Abstracting and indexing ==
The journal is abstracted and indexed in the Arts and Humanities Citation Index, Scopus, and the MLA International Bibliography.
