= 2013 in Wales =

- Centuries: 19th; 20th; 21st
- Decades: 1990s; 2000s; 2010s; 2020s
- See also: List of years in Wales; Timeline of Welsh history 2013 in The United Kingdom England Scotland Elsewhere

This article is about the particular significance of the year 2013 to Wales and its people.

== Incumbents ==
- First Minister – Carwyn Jones
- Secretary of State for Wales – David Jones
- Archbishop of Wales – Barry Morgan, Bishop of Llandaff
- Archdruid of the National Eisteddfod of Wales – Jim Parc Nest

== Events ==
=== January ===
- 1 January – Welsh recipients of New Year Honours include cycling coach Dave Brailsford, Glamorgan cricketer Robert Croft and politician Roger Williams.
- 3 January – The Met Office reports that 2012 was the third wettest year on record for Wales.
- 18 January – Heavy snow brings wide-ranging disruption throughout Wales, especially in Brecon and the Heads of the Valleys.
- 29 January – A deal struck between the BBC and S4C ensures independent Welsh language broadcasting, funded by the BBC licence fee, until 2017.

=== February ===
- 5 February – Welsh Secretary David Jones is criticised by the media and political opponents for taking an official car for a 100-metre journey from the Wales Office to 10 Downing Street.
- 9 February – Over 100 people gather to mark the 50th anniversary of the bombing of an electricity transformer by Mudiad Amddiffyn Cymru at the construction site of the Tryweryn reservoir.
- 12 February – A meat firm in Aberystwyth is raided by police in a wider investigation into the mislabelling of horsemeat in British processed foods.
- 19 February – The sky above the Brecon Beacons National Park is granted the status of international dark sky reserve. The first such area in Wales and only the fifth worldwide.

=== March ===
- 1 March
  - Charles, Prince of Wales and the Duchess of Cornwall visit Cardiff as part of Saint David's Day celebrations, though it is announced that the Queen has been forced to cancel a visit to Swansea the following day due to ill health.
  - Karl Jenkins signs to Deutsche Grammophon and announces a new album, to be called Adiemus Colores.
- 22–23 March – Heavy snow across north and eastern Wales causes over 3,000 homes to suffer power losses.
- 27 March – The Welsh government buys Cardiff Airport for 52 Million pounds. The airport had experienced a reduction in passenger numbers to one million in 2012 after a peak of two million in 2007.

=== April ===
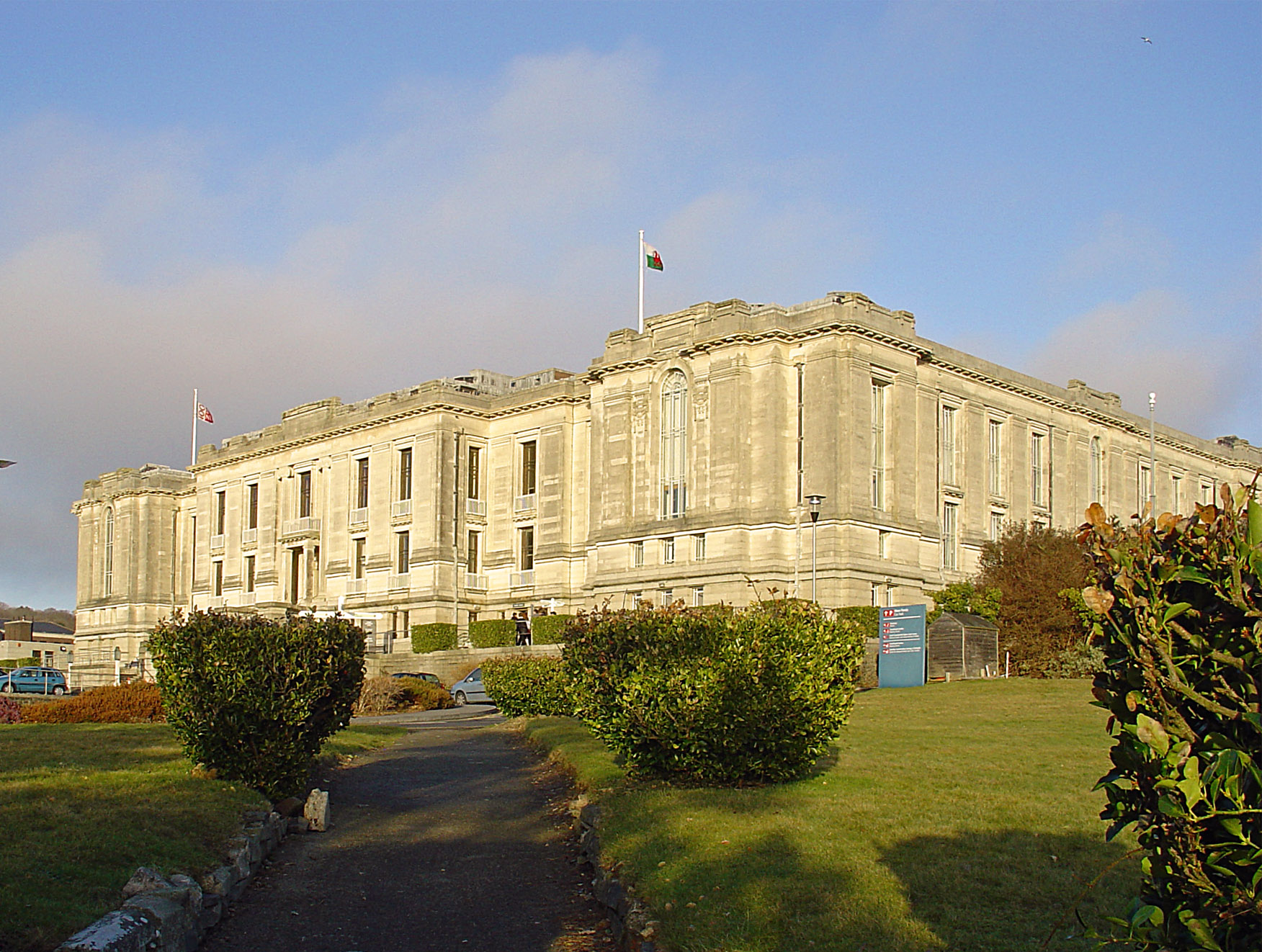
In April a fire at the National Library of Wales saw a portion of its collection damaged.

- 1 April – Natural Resources Wales becomes operational, replacing the Countryside Council for Wales.
- 3 April – 2013 Swansea measles epidemic: The number of measles cases in the Swansea area surpasses 500. The epidemic is believed to be linked to the MMR vaccine controversy.
- 11 April – University of South Wales formed from the merger of the University of Glamorgan and the University of Wales, Newport.
- 26 April – A fire at the National Library of Wales in Aberystwyth results in damage to a portion of its collection.

=== May ===
- 2 May – Anglesey is the only part of Wales to vote in the United Kingdom local elections, the election having been postponed from 2012 by the Welsh Government, in order to allow an electoral review to take place.
- 9 May – Janet Henderson, Llandaff's first female dean, resigns after only two months in the role.
- 18 May – Bonnie Tyler represents the United Kingdom in the 2013 Eurovision Song Contest, singing "Believe in Me", amassing a total of 28 points to finish well down the field.
- 23 May – Charles, Prince of Wales, visits the Hay Festival on the opening day of the 2013 event. Charles and his consort are delayed when the helicopter bringing them from London is forced to land in Buckinghamshire by a "technical fault".
- 27 May – The Urdd eisteddfod opens at Cilwendeg Farm near Boncath, Pembrokeshire.
- 28 May – Paul Mealor's latest work, The Farthest Shore (chorus, boys choir, brass & organ, 2013) receives its première in St David's Cathedral.
- 30 May – Mark Bridger is found guilty of the abduction and murder of five-year-old April Jones. He is given a whole-life sentence.

=== June ===
- 15 June – Welsh recipients of honours in the Queen's 2013 Birthday Honours list include philanthropist Michael Moritz (knighthood), politician Kirsty Williams (CBE), comedian Rob Brydon (MBE), and musicians Aled Jones (MBE) and Tim Rhys-Evans (MBE).
- 16–23 June – BBC Cardiff Singer of the World 30th anniversary competition takes place in St David's Hall, Cardiff.
- 23 June – Christine James takes up her post as Archdruid of the National Eisteddfod of Wales at the Proclamation Ceremony for the 2013 Eisteddfod. James is the first woman to hold the position, as well as the first Welsh learner to do so.
- 25 June – Welsh Education Minister Leighton Andrews resigns from the post after a conflict of interest between his support for a constituent led campaign and government policy. His decision is seen as the first instance of a forced resignation in the history of the Assembly.

=== July ===
- 2 July – Wales becomes the first country in the United Kingdom to bring into law an opt-out organ donation system.
- 3 July – The 2013 Swansea measles epidemic is declared over, eight months after it began. 1,219 people, mainly children, have been diagnosed with the disease during the outbreak.
- 13 July – Wales's highest temperature of the year so far is recorded, at 30.2 degrees C (Llysdinam weather station)
- 13–14 July – Four people die in three separate incidents on the Brecon Beacons. Two Territorial Army reservists die during an army training exercise, while there are two record swimming deaths at Cantref and Ponsticill Reservoirs.

=== August ===
- 1 August – The 2013 Ynys Môn by-election is held for the Welsh Assembly constituency of Ynys Môn, following the resignation on 20 June 2013 of its sitting Assembly Member, Ieuan Wyn Jones. Plaid Cymru's Rhun ap Iorwerth retains the seat for the party.
- 25 August – It is confirmed that North Wales Police and Crime Commissioner Winston Roddick is being investigated by the Independent Police Complaints Commission after being suspected of having breached the terms of his election to the position.
- 27 August – Helen Mary Jones announces that she will not stand again as Chair of Plaid Cymru.

=== September ===
- 12 September – The Church in Wales passes a bill that will allow women to be consecrated as bishops.
- 26 September – Almost a year after her disappearance, a funeral is held in Machynlleth for April Jones.
- 28 September – Only Men Aloud! begin rehearsing with their new 8-man line-up.

=== October ===
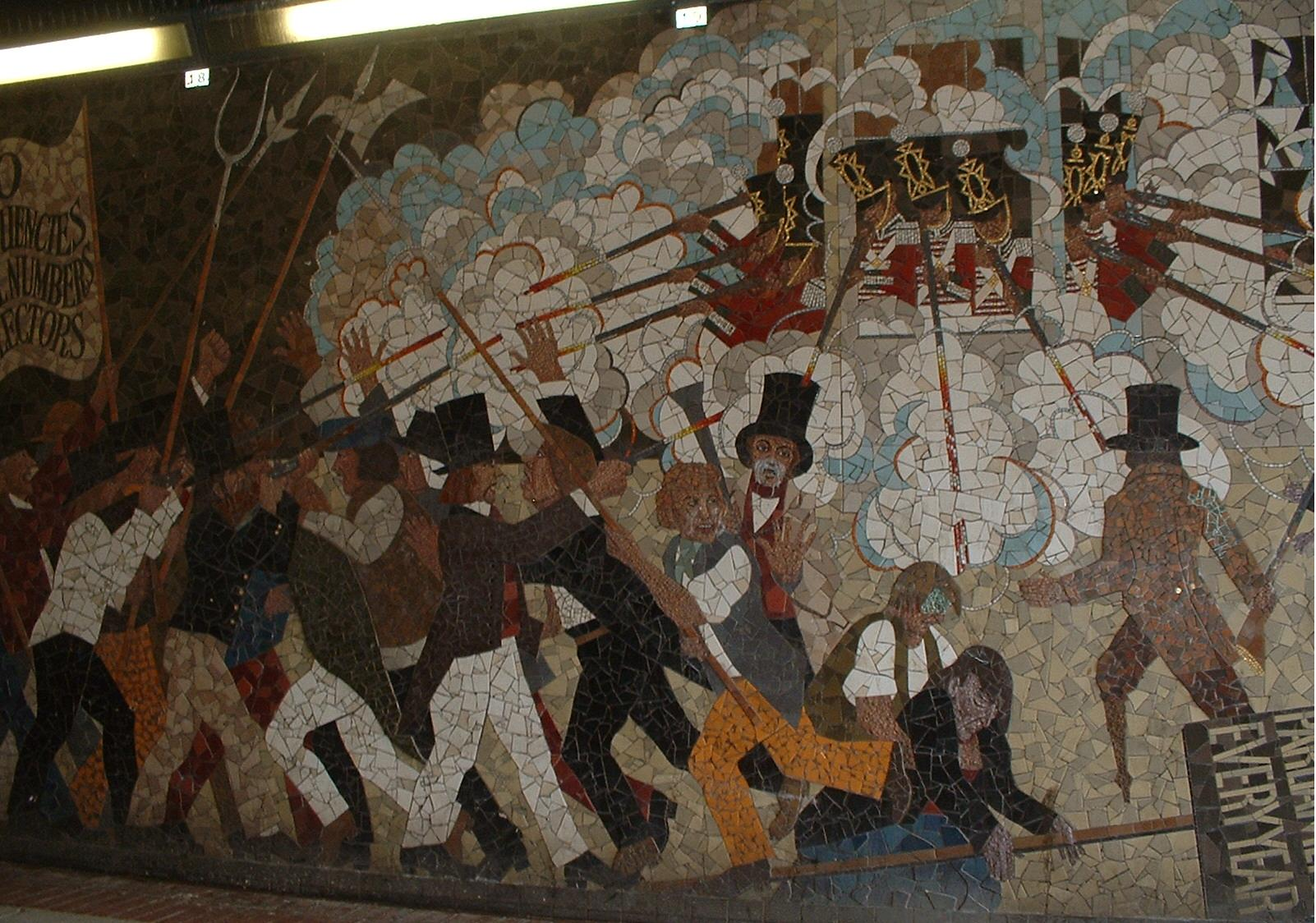
The Newport Chartist mural which was demolished by the City Council in October this year

- 1 October – Sir John Thomas is appointed as Lord Chief Justice of England and Wales.
- 4 October – Despite some opposition from residents, the Newport Chartist Mural off John Frost Square is demolished to make way for a new shopping centre development.
- 11 October – In her speech at the end of Plaid Cymru's annual conference, party leader Leanne Wood pledges to reduce energy bills.
- 14 October – The new Wales National Mining Memorial is unveiled at Senghenydd, on the 100th anniversary of Britain's worst-ever mining disaster.
- 15 October – the 300th anniversary of John Wesley's first sermon in Wales is commemorated with the unveiling of a bronze bust in Devauden, Monmouthshire.

=== November ===
- 1 November – In a joint statement issued by David Cameron and Nick Clegg at the Senedd, the Welsh government is to be offered some control over income tax subject to a referendum.
- 10 November – Troops from the 3rd Battalion of the Royal Welsh make their final appearance at a Remembrance Day service in Wrexham, prior to vacating Hightown Barracks.
- 23 November – British pop artist Sir Peter Blake sees his collection of work based on Dylan Thomas' Under Milk Wood exhibited at the National Museum Cardiff. The collection of watercolours, illustrations and collages had taken Sir Peter 28 years to complete.
- 26 November – Former Archbishop of Canterbury Rowan Williams give the annual TS Eliot Lecture at Clare College, Cambridge; his speech is entitled Eliot’s Christian Society and the current political crisis.

=== December ===
- December – Old wooden Pont Briwet, found in November to have been affected by the piling work for the new bridge alongside, is declared structurally unsafe and closed completely to road and rail traffic.
- 18 December – At Cardiff Crown Court, rock star Ian Watkins receives a sentence of 29 years imprisonment plus an extended licence period of 6 years for sexual offences against the children of two women convicted with him who receive sentences of 14 years and 17 years imprisonment.
- 26 December – Boxing Day gales affect North and Mid Wales, with a total of 20,000 homes losing their electricity supply over a 3-day period.
- 27 December – Maria Leijerstam from the Vale of Glamorgan becomes the first person to cycle to the South Pole.
- 30 December – Katherine Jenkins says she feels "humbled" by receiving the OBE in the 2014 New Year Honours. Other Welsh awardees include Rosemary Butler and Ruth Jones.
- 31 December – A record number of competitors take part in the annual Nos Galan road race in Mountain Ash. The 'mystery' runner is revealed to be Wales and British & Irish Lions rugby player Alun Wyn Jones.

== Arts and culture ==
=== Welsh Awards ===
- Glyndŵr Award
- National Eisteddfod of Wales: Chair – withheld
- National Eisteddfod of Wales: Crown – Ifor ap Glyn
- National Eisteddfod of Wales: Prose Medal – Jane Jones Owen
- National Eisteddfod of Wales: Drama Medal – Glesni Haf Jones
- Gwobr Goffa Daniel Owen: Bet Jones, Craciau
- Wales Book of the Year:
  - English language: Rhian Edwards Clueless Dogs
  - Welsh language: Heini Gruffudd, Yr Erlid
- Dylan Thomas Prize: Battleborn – Claire Vaye Watkins
- Kyffin Art Prize:

=== New books ===
==== English language ====
- Mark Baker, Dewi Gregory & Siân Price – Y Plas – The Story Of The Welsh Country House
- Jonathan Hicks – The Dead of Mametz
- Roger Williams – Tir Sir Gâr (play)

==== Welsh language ====
- Christine James – Rhwng y Llinellau
- Alan Llwyd – Bob – Cofiant R. Williams Parry

=== Film ===
- Y Syrcas, starring Saran Morgan

=== Music ===
==== Awards ====
- Cân i Gymru – Jessop a'r Sgweiri, Mynd I Gorwen Hefo Alys
- Welsh Music Prize – Georgia Ruth, Week of Pines

==== Albums ====
- Euros Childs – Situation Comedy
- Mark Llywelyn Evans – This Guy's In Love
- Wynne Evans – Wynne
- Future of the Left – How to Stop Your Brain in an Accident
- Cate Le Bon – Mug Museum
- Neon Neon – Praxis Makes Perfect
- Georgia Ruth – Week of Pines
- Sweet Baboo – Ships
- Bryn Terfel – Homeward Bound (with the Mormon Tabernacle Choir)
- Zervas and Pepper – Lifebringer

==== New Works ====
- Paul Mealor – The Farthest Shore

==== Groups ====
- Alternative rock band Trampolene forms in Swansea.

== Sport ==
=== Awards ===
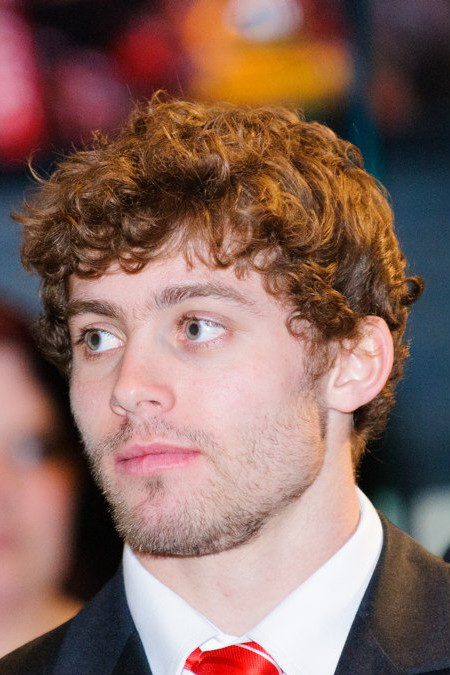
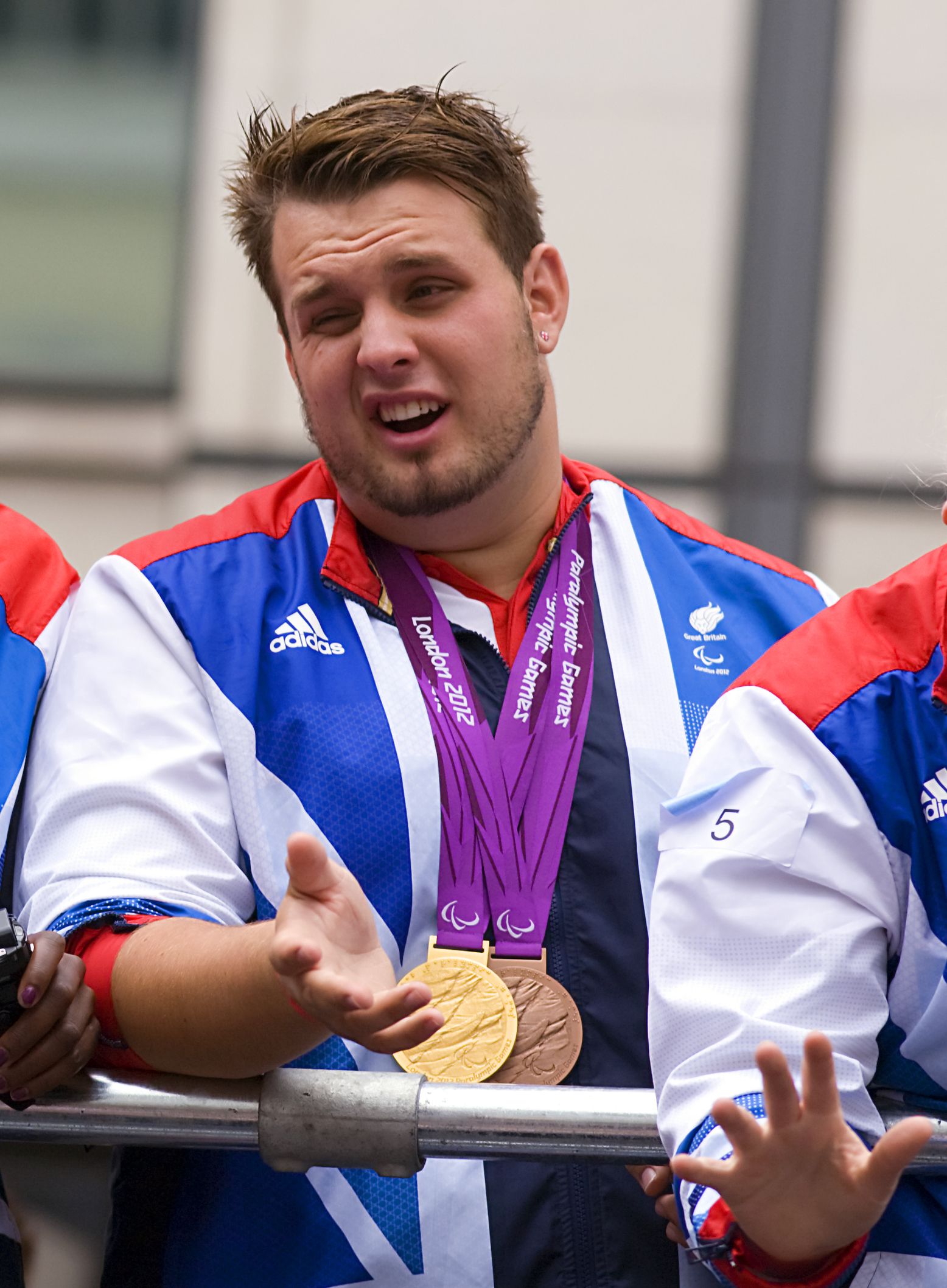
Leigh Halfpenny (rugby union) and Aled Davies (athletics) were both recognized nationally for their sporting achievements in 2013.
- Rugby union fullback Leigh Halfpenny wins BBC Wales Sports Personality of the Year for 2013. The other four nominees were footballer Gareth Bale, cyclist Becky James and athletes Aled Davies and Non Stanford.
- Leigh Halfpenny comes second to Andy Murray in the 2013 BBC Sports Personality of the Year Award.
- Aled Davies is named Paralympic Sportsman of the Year at the 2013 Sports Journalists' Association Awards.

=== In sports ===
- Athletics
  - 22 March – It is announced that Swansea will host the 2014 IPC Athletics European Championships, the first time the event will be held in the United Kingdom.
  - 7 April – Non Stanford wins her first senior triathlon, taking the European Cup in Portugal.
  - 21 July – In the 2013 IPC Athletics World Championships medals are won by Aled Davies (gold in the shot put – F42), Kyron Duke (bronze in the shot put – F41) and Josie Pearson (gold in the discus F51/52/53).
  - 14 September – Non Stanford becomes ITU World Triathlon champion after winning the Triathlon Grand Final in London.
- Baseball
  - 13 July – Wales beat England to retain the annual Gladstone Rose Bowl in the 88th meeting between the teams.
- Boxing
  - 16 February – Gavin Rees is stopped in the fifth round in his WBC lightweight bout against American champion Adrien Broner.
  - 20 April – Nathan Cleverly successfully defends his WBO Light-heavyweight belt against Robin Krasniqi with a unanimous decision after the bout goes the full twelve rounds.
  - 17 August – Nathan Cleverly loses his WBO light-heavyweight title to Russian Sergey Kovalev in Cardiff. On the undercard of the same fight Enzo Maccarinelli became the Commonwealth light-heavyweight champion after stopping Ovil McKenzie in the 11th round.
  - 25 October – Andrew Selby wins bronze in the flyweight class at the 2013 AIBA World Boxing Championships.
- Cricket
  - 21 September – In the final of the 2013 Yorkshire Bank 40, held at Lords, Glamorgan lose to Nottinghamshire by 87 runs.
- Cycling
  - 27 January – Geraint Thomas finishes third in the 2013 Tour Down Under.
  - 20–24 February – Welsh cyclists win six medals as part of the Great Britain team at the 2013 UCI Track Cycling World Championships. Becky James, making her debut at the championships, takes four medals: gold in the Women's sprint and Women's keirin and bronze in both the Women's 500 m time trial and Women's team sprint, while team-mates Sam Harrison takes silver as part of the men's team pursuit and Elinor Barker wins the gold medal as part of the British women's team pursuit.
  - 2 November – Elinor Barker is part of the women's Team Pursuit team that twice broke the world record during the first round of the UCI Track Cycling World Cup in Manchester.
  - 7 December – Owain Doull wins gold in the scratch race in the second leg of the 2013–14 UCI Track Cycling World Cup in Aguascalientes, Mexico.
- Football
  - 24 February – Swansea City beat Bradford City 5–0 to win the 2012–13 Football League Cup.
  - 24 March – Wrexham beat Grimsby Town on penalties in the 2013 FA Trophy Final after the encounter finished 1–1 after extra time. It is the first time Wrexham had played at Wembley in their 149-year history.
  - 20 April – Cardiff City are promoted to the Premier League as champions, with two games left of the season.
  - 2 May – Gareth Bale is named the Football Writers' Association Footballer of the Year, adding to his awards gained the previous week when he was also made Professional Footballers' Association Player of the Year and Young Player of the Year.
  - 5 May – Newport County are promoted back into The Football League after beating fellow Welsh side Wrexham in the play-off final of the Football Conference.
  - 6 May – Prestatyn Town beat Bangor City 3–1 after extra time to win the 2013 Welsh Cup.
  - 9 August – Barry Town United win a court battle over the Football Association of Wales, allowing the team to rejoin the Welsh League after being illegally withdrawn from the competition in May.
  - 1 September – Gareth Bale is transferred from Tottenham Hotspur to Real Madrid in a world transfer record of £85.3m (100m euros).
  - 25 September – Cliff Jones, former Wales international and Tottenham Hotspur winger, becomes only the sixth Welsh player to be inducted into the English Football Hall of Fame.
  - 3 November – The first Premier League meeting between Cardiff City and Swansea City ends in a 1–0 victory to Cardiff.
- Golf
  - 20 January – Jamie Donaldson wins the 2013 Abu Dhabi HSBC Golf Championship.
  - 1 September – France's Grégory Bourdy wins the 2013 Wales Open.
- Horse racing
  - 5 January – The postponed 2012 Welsh National is won by Paul Carberry on Monbeg Dude.
  - 6 April – At the 2013 Grand National, two of the placed horses were trained at Welsh stables. Cappa Bleu trained by Evan Williams finishes second while Teaforthree, trained by Rebecca Curtis was third.
  - 28 December – The 2013 Welsh National is won by 20–1 shot Mountainous, ridden by Paul Moloney.
- Netball
  - 25 May – Celtic Dragons are beaten by Team Bath in the 2013 Netball Superleague Grand Final.
  - 1 June – The Wales national netball team win the 2013 Europe Netball Open held in Aberdeen, with victories over England, Northern Ireland and Scotland.
- Rugby league
  - 27 October – The Millennium Stadium in Cardiff hosts the opening ceremony and the first two matches of the 2013 Rugby League World Cup.
  - 3 November – Wales are knocked out of the group stages of the 2013 Rugby League World Cup after losing to the United States at the Racecourse Ground in Wrexham.
- Rugby union
  - 16 March – Despite losing the opening match against Ireland, in the final game of the tournament Wales beat England by a record 30–3 margin to retain the Six Nations Championship.
  - 24 March – Wales reach their very first Hong Kong Sevens final, but despite being 19–0 ahead at half time, they lose 26–19 to Fiji.
  - 30 April – 15 Welsh international players are picked by British & Irish Lions head coach Warren Gatland for the Summer tour of Australia. Sam Warburton is named as the Lions' captain.
  - 4 May – Pontypridd come from behind to beat Neath to lift the 2013 Swalec Cup. The competition also saw Heol y Cyw RFC win the Challenge Plate final while Wattstown RFC won the Challenge Bowl.
  - 18 May – Pontypridd beat Llanelli in the 2013 Welsh Premiership Play-off Final to secure their first League and cup double.
  - 23 June – Sam Davies becomes the first Welsh player to win the IRB Junior Player of the Year.
  - 6 July – A record number of ten Welsh players are selected to start for the third and final Test of the 2013 British & Irish Lions tour to Australia. The Lions won the third Test 16–41, taking the series 2–1. Leigh Halfpenny is named the player of the tournament.
- Sailing
  - 31 August – Edward Wright wins silver in the 2013 Finn Gold Cup.
- Snooker
  - 17 February – Stephen Maguire beats Stuart Bingham in the final of the 2013 Welsh Open.
  - 21 April – in his first appearance at the World Snooker Championship Michael White beats fellow Welshman and two-time world champion Mark Williams in the first round.
- Speedway
  - 1 June – Russia's Emil Sayfutdinov wins the 2013 Speedway Grand Prix of Great Britain held at the Millennium Stadium in Cardiff.
- Table tennis
  - 30 September – Para table tennis player Rob Davies beats fellow Welsh-man Paul Davies in the final of the 2013 European Open. The result sees Rob Davies become the world number 1 in the class one category.

== Broadcasting ==
=== English-language television ===
- Doctor Who (series 7) and the 50th anniversary special Day of the Doctor for BBC television.
- Stella (series 2) – a comedy drama written by and starring Ruth Jones filmed on location in the Rhondda Valley.
- Wizards vs Aliens (series 2) – CBBC programme produced by BBC Cymru Wales and FremantleMedia Enterprises.

=== Welsh-language television ===
- Gwaith/Cartref
- Y Gwyll

== Deaths ==
- 11 January – Tom Parry Jones, inventor of the electronic breathalyser, 77
- 13 January – Geoff Thomas, footballer, 64
- 14 January – Tony Conran, poet, 81
- 18 January – Ken Jones, footballer, 77
- 20 January – Freddie Williams, world champion speedway rider, 86
- 7 February – Glyn Davies, footballer, 80
- 7 March – Sybil Christopher, actress and director, 83
- 10 March – Princess Lilian, Duchess of Halland, 97
- 12 March
  - Harry Greene, TV DIY expert, 89
  - Gordon Pembery, footballer, 86
- 22 March – Fred Jones, footballer, 75
- 12 April – Dennis John, footballer, 78
- 24 May – Ron Davies, footballer, 70
- 19 June – John Hughes, founder of The Grogg Shop, 78
- 2 July – Anthony Llewellyn, scientist and NASA astronaut.
- 4 July – Onllwyn Brace, international rugby union player, 80
- 12 July – Elaine Morgan, writer, 92
- 13 July – George Paget, 7th Marquess of Anglesey, 90
- 21 July – Phil Woosnam, international footballer, manager and sports administrator, 80
- 31 July – Jon Manchip White, novelist,
- 6 August – Steve Aizlewood, footballer, 60
- 7 August – Roy Davies, former Bishop of Llandaff, 79
- 16 August
  - Chris Hallam, Paralympic athlete, 50
  - David Rees, mathematician and academic, 95
- 21 August – Pat Roberts, golfer, 92
- 27 August – Dave Thomas, golfer and golf course designer, 79
- 29 August – Cliff Morgan, rugby union player and TV personality, 83
- 21 August – Huw Jenkins, cricketer, 68
- 26 September – Ellis Evans, Celtic scholar, 83
- 3 October – Ian Skidmore, writer and broadcaster, 84
- 21 October – Stuart Williams, rugby union player, 33
- 26 October – Ron Davies, photographer, 91
- 30 October – Ray Mielczarek, footballer, 67
- 4 November – Elfed Morris, footballer, 71
- 21 November – Tony Summers, Olympic swimmer
- 26 November – Stan Stennett, all-round entertainer, 88
- 13 December – Wyn Roberts, Baron Roberts of Conwy, politician, 83
- 24 December – Gwynfor Pierce Jones, historian, 60

== See also ==
- 2013 in Northern Ireland
