= 2013 Swansea measles epidemic =

Measles epidemic in Wales

2012–2013 Swansea measles epidemic
- Disease: Measles
- Dates: November 2012 – 3 July 2013
- Confirmed cases: 1,219
- Deaths: 1

The 2012–2013 Swansea measles epidemic began in November 2012 and was declared over on 3 July 2013. There were a total of 1,219 measles notifications (suspected cases) in Swansea, Neath Port Talbot, Bridgend, Carmarthenshire, Ceredigion, Pembrokeshire and Powys, with 1,455 measles notifications for the whole of Wales, 664 of which were in Swansea alone. A total of 88 people were hospitalised for measles infection during the epidemic. One death was reported: a 25-year-old man with giant cell pneumonia brought on by measles infection died on 18 April 2013. The cost associated with treating the sick and controlling the outbreak exceeded £470,000 ($701,898).

== History ==
Some sources linked the outbreak with the MMR vaccine controversy and a campaign in the South Wales Evening Post in the 1990s against the MMR vaccine, as the majority of those who became infected were not immunised as infants during the MMR scare. Uptake of the MMR vaccine fell from 94% of two-year-olds in Wales in 1995 to 78% by 2003. In the Swansea area the uptake fell to 67.5%. The South Wales Evening Post was also criticised for appearing to exaggerate the number of confirmed measles cases that occurred during the epidemic.

In the wake of the outbreak MMR clinics were set up in four hospitals in Swansea and Neath-Port Talbot and vaccinated over 35,000 people. Several politicians, including Welsh First Minister Carwyn Jones, urged the public to make sure their children were vaccinated. Politicians and vaccine experts also called for mandatory vaccinations to be implemented. The Welsh Government opposed mandatory vaccination, believing that trust in the MMR vaccine had been regained and could be damaged if it were mandatory.

Hywel Dda Health Board offered the vaccine in April 2013 in the surrounding counties of Carmarthen, Ceredigion and Pembrokeshire in a bid to contain the outbreak. Vaccinations were held in all comprehensive schools in Powys. There were concerns that the epidemic could spread to London and infect many more people, prompting the Department of Health to set up a mass vaccination campaign targeted at one million school children throughout England.

The following table shows measles notifications by the Local Health Board.

Health Board	Nov 2012	Dec	Jan 2013	Feb	Mar	Apr	May	June	July	Total
Abertawe Bro Morgannwg	15	37	39	66	239	440	98	26	0	960
Hwyel Dda	17	24	8	9	14	43	28	13	2	158
Powys	2	0	3	0	36	46	12	2	0	101
Total	34	61	50	75	289	529	138	41	2	1219

Reported notifications tend to exceed confirmed cases. Public Health Wales issued a statement saying, "Measles is one of a number of notifiable diseases. Doctors in Wales have a statutory duty to notify a 'Proper Officer' of the Local Authority of suspected cases of measles based on clinical symptoms, usually before diagnosis has been confirmed by laboratory testing. Reported notifications of measles usually far exceed the actual numbers of confirmed cases. Other rashes are often mistaken for measles".

== See also ==
- Outbreak
- Pulse vaccination strategy
- Vaccine-naive
