= Neath Guardian =

- Type: Weekly newspaper
- Format: Tabloid
- Owner(s): Reach plc
- Publisher: Media Wales
- Founded: 1925
- Political alignment: None
- Language: English
- Ceased publication: 1 October 2009
- Circulation: 4,815 (August 2007)
- Price: £0.60

The Neath Guardian was a local weekly newspaper published between 1925 and 2009 covering Neath, Wales, and the surrounding area. At the time of its closure, it was published weekly, on a Wednesday, in the tabloid format by Media Wales (formerly Western Mail and Echo), part of the Trinity Mirror group.

The newspaper had two editions: the Neath Guardian, which covered the town itself, as well as Briton Ferry, Skewen, and the communities of the Neath and Dulais valleys, and the Port Talbot Guardian, which covered Port Talbot, Baglan, Margam and the Afan Valley.

Both titles were part of the Celtic Weekly Newspapers series, which still publishes seven other weekly titles across South Wales. Neither edition covered the communities of the Swansea Valley, even though some are within the boundaries of the Neath Port Talbot county borough.

Simon Kelner, former editor-in-chief of The Independent, began his career on the Neath Guardian, as did BBC World Service business correspondent Steve Evans, who reported live from the World Trade Center during the September 11 terrorist attacks, and Daily Express rugby writer Steve Bale.

== See also ==
- List of newspapers in Wales
