= Mike Castro de Maria =

Swiss musician (born 1972)

- Birth name: Mike Castro Demaria
- Born: Geneva, Switzerland
- Genres: Downtempo; Lounge music Deep house Lo-fi music
- Instrument(s): Keyboard; Guitar bass Saxophone; Percussion
- Labels: Ultrasonique; Twiggy Records

Mike Castro de Maria (Mike Castro Demaria) is an electronic music composer from Cannes, France. He was born in Geneva in 1972 to a Galician father who had fled from Francoist Spain and a Franco-Italian mother. His street name is a combination of his origins and he decided to use it as his stage name.

At fifteen, he started on the bass, which led him to appear with different bands on the Côte d'Azur. In 1991 he formed the band "Loi 91-32", a venture that was to last more than a year.

In 1994 at the Blitz nightclub, he met Charlotte & Max, the future founders of Twiggy Records. Max, a DJ on the Riviera, introduced him to electronic music and artists such as Lady B, Scan X, Didier Sinclair, Adolphe, and Green Velvet, etc.

In 2005 Mike Castro de Maria released So sweet lounge, his first lounge and cocooning album. In 2006 he met Anne Moreau who wrote the lyrics for "Live goes". Sweet Sugar Lounge, the second work in this series, has been available since June 2007.

In December 2010, after two years of work on different tracks, the "Winter games" Single was released. This is an electronic drum & bass track.

In February 2011, he released "Tempus fugit" the first opus of the Ultrasonique series.

== Discography ==
=== Albums ===
- 2002 : Dream Time
- 2003 : Electronic Home Session
- 2005 : So sweet lounge Distributor
- 2007 : Sweet Sugar Lounge Distributor
- 2011 : Tempus Fugit Distributor
- 2025 : Gone Gel - EP Distributor

=== Singles ===
- 2011 : Winter Games Distributor
- 2025 : Gum Gun Distributor
- 2025 : My Buddy'll Always Be Late ... Distributor
- 2025 : Poppy the Pug Distributor
- 2025 : Pug, What Else? Distributor
- 2025 : Pug Hug Symphony Distributor
- 2025 : Riding High ... ( In the Sky ) Distributor
- 2025 : Ritmo Do Agora Distributor
- 2025 : Sleeping Pug Distributor

== Sources ==
- distributor : "Mike Castro de Maria BIO".
