= Celtic Weekly Newspapers =

Celtic Weekly Newspapers is a series of seven weekly newspapers published in south Wales by Media Wales Ltd (formerly Western Mail & Echo Ltd), part of Reach plc.

The titles in the series are:

- Cynon Valley Leader
- Glamorgan Gazette
- Gwent Gazette
- Merthyr Express
- Pontypridd & Llantrisant Observer
- Rhondda Leader
- Rhymney Valley Express

The Neath Guardian – which also had a Port Talbot edition – was part of the series until its closure in October 2009.

== See also ==
- List of newspapers in Wales
