= Polio v/s Polio victims =

Polio v/s Polio Victims
- Directed by: Aman Sachdeva
- Written by: Samrat Rane
- Release date: 2008
- Country: India

Polio v/s Polio Victims is the National Award Winning Documentary film. The documentary won "Best Motivational/ Educational Film" at the 56th National Film Awards. The documentary follows a group of polio victims who took to the streets in 2008 to spread the message of the Pulse Polio Campaign. The film follows them as they go door to door, in various slums in Mumbai, to spread awareness about the upcoming "Pulse Polio Day". The film is written by Samrat Rane and directed by Aman Sachdeva.
