= Rhondda Leader =

- Type: Weekly newspaper
- Format: Tabloid
- Owner: Trinity Mirror
- Publisher: Media Wales
- Editor-in-chief: Simon Farrington
- Editor: Wayne Nowaczyk
- Founded: 1899
- Political alignment: Labour
- Language: English
- Headquarters: 10, Market Street, Pontypridd, Mid Glamorgan, CF37 2ST
- Circulation: 331 (as of 2023)
- Price: £0.75
- Website: rhonddaleader.co.uk

The Rhondda Leader is a weekly newspaper distributed in the Rhondda Valleys, South Wales. The tabloid newspaper is published on a Wednesday by Media Wales which is owned by the UK's largest newspaper corporation, Trinity Mirror. Part of the Celtic Weekly Newspapers series, which publishes eight other titles in South Wales, the Leader was founded in 1899.

== History ==
The Rhondda Leader was first published in 1899 and nine years later became the Rhondda Leader, Maesteg, Garw and Ogmore Telegraph.

The Porth Gazette was published from 1900 to 1944 and during that period there was a newspaper called the Rhondda Socialist. The Rhondda Gazette was also in circulation from 1913 to 1919 while the Rhondda Clarion was being read in the late 1930s.

The Porth Gazette and Rhondda Leader was published from 1944 to 1967 while also published in Pontypridd during those years was the Rhondda Fach Leader and Gazette.

In more recent years the Rhondda Leader and Pontypridd & Llantrisant Observer combined before the Rhondda Leader again became a separate edition.
