= Ring vaccination =

Strategy to inhibit the spread of a disease

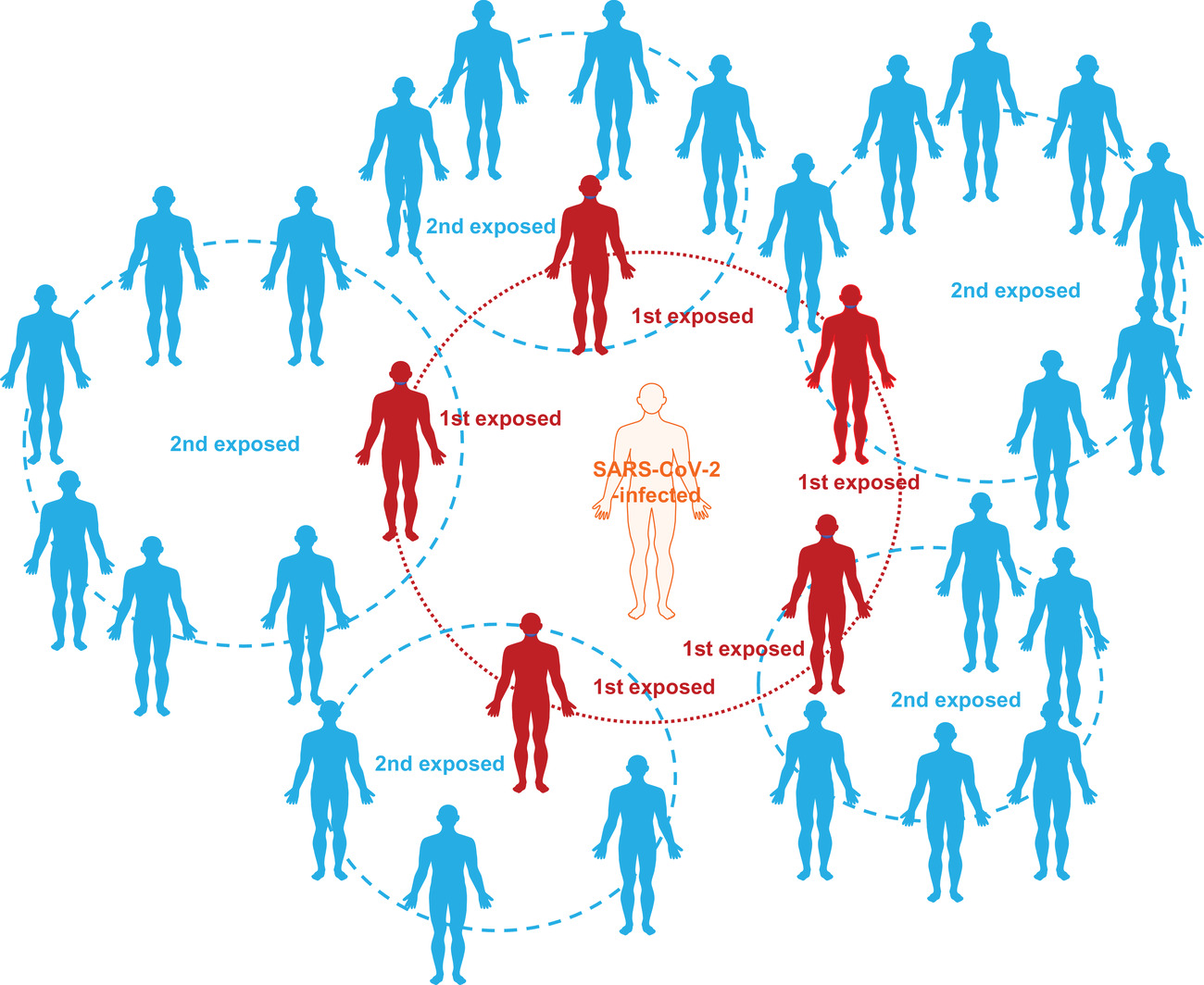
- Schematic diagram of ring vaccination strategy
- Specialty: Immunology

Ring vaccination is a strategy to inhibit the spread of a disease by vaccinating those who are most likely to be infected.

This strategy vaccinates the contacts of confirmed patients, and people who are in close contact with those contacts. This way, everyone who has been, or could have been, exposed to a patient receives the vaccine, creating a 'ring' of protection that can limit the spread of a pathogen.

Ring vaccination requires thorough and rapid surveillance and epidemiologic case investigation. The Intensified Smallpox Eradication Program used this strategy with great success in its efforts to eradicate smallpox in the latter half of the 20th century.

== Medical use ==
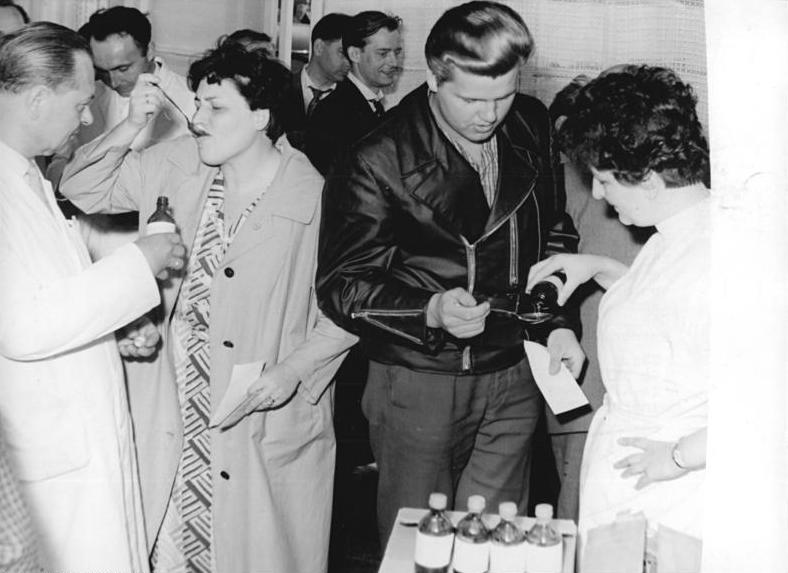
Ring vaccination was part of this response to a diphtheria epidemic, Berlin, 1962

When someone falls ill, people they might have infected should be vaccinated. Contacts who might have been infected typically include family, neighbours, and friends. Several layers of contacts may be vaccinated (the contacts, the contacts' contacts, the contact's contacts' contacts, etc.).

Ring vaccination relies on contact tracing to determine possible infections. However, this can be difficult. In some cases, it is preferable to vaccinate as many people as possible within the geographic area of known infection (geographically-targeted reactive vaccination). If the infections occur within a defined geographic boundary, it may be preferable to vaccinate the entire community in which the illness has appeared, rather than explicitly tracing contacts.

Many vaccines take several weeks to induce immunity, and thus do not provide immediate protection. However, even if some of the ill person's contacts are already infected, ring vaccination can prevent the virus from being transmitted again, to the ill contacts' contacts. A few vaccines can protect even if they are given just after infection; ring vaccination is somewhat more effective for vaccines providing this post-exposure prophylaxis.

== Advantages ==
When responding to a possible outbreak, health officials should consider which is best, ring vaccination or mass vaccination. In some outbreaks, it might be better to only vaccinate those directly exposed; variable factors (such as demographics and the vaccine that is available) can make one method or the other safer, with fewer people experiencing side-effects when the same number are protected from the disease.

== History ==
Ring vaccination was used in Leicester, England in the late 19th-century. It was also used in the mid-20th century in the eradication of smallpox.

It was used experimentally in the Ebola virus epidemic in West Africa.

In 2018, health authorities used a ring vaccination strategy to try to suppress the 2018 Équateur province Ebola outbreak. This involved vaccinating only those most likely to be infected; direct contacts of infected individuals, and contacts of those contacts. The vaccine used was rVSV-ZEBOV.

Ring vaccination has been used extensively in the 2018 Kivu Ebola outbreak, with over 90,000 people vaccinated. In April 2019, the WHO published the preliminary results of the research by its research, in association with the DRC's Institut National pour la Recherche Biomedicale, into the effectiveness of the ring vaccination program, stating that the rVSV-ZEBOV-GP vaccine had been 97.5% effective at stopping Ebola transmission, relative to no vaccination.

== See also ==
- Cocooning (immunization)
- Herd immunity
- Pulse vaccination strategy
- Targeted immunization strategies
- Vaccination
