= Media Wales =

Publishing company based in Cardiff, Wales

Media Wales Ltd.
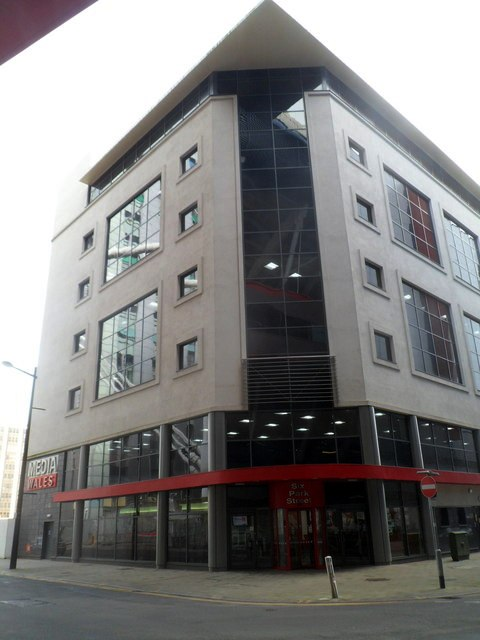
- Park Street and Scott Road, 2012
- Founded: 1869
- Headquarters: Six Park Street, Cardiff, Wales
- Products: National and regional newspapers
- Website: www.walesonline.co.uk

Media Wales Ltd. is a publishing company based in Cardiff, Wales. As of 2009 it was owned by Reach plc (formerly known as the Trinity Mirror Group). It was previously known as the Western Mail & Echo Ltd.

== History ==
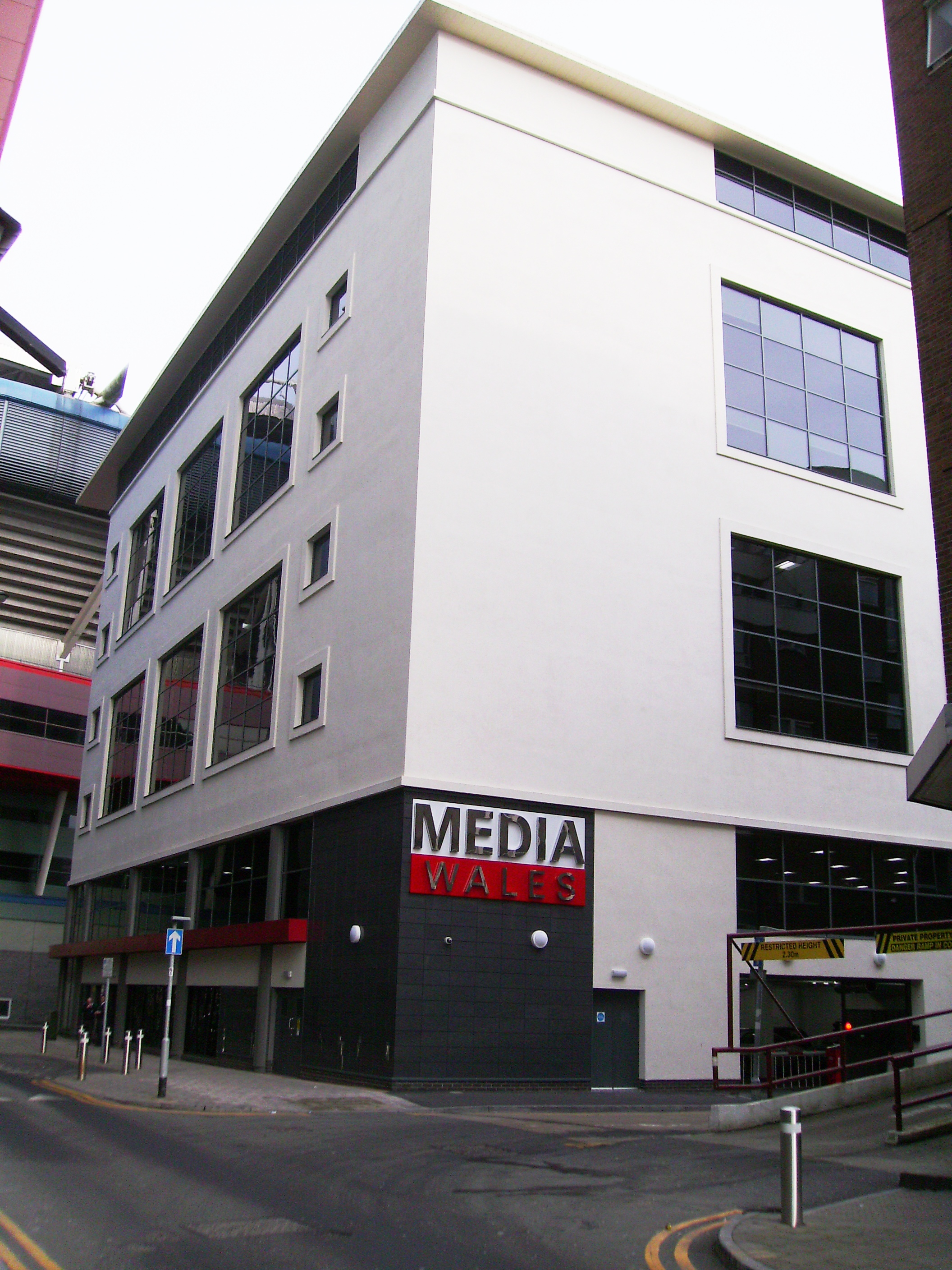
Scott Road view, Media Wales offices, Cardiff, Wales, 2009

The Western Mail was founded in 1869 by the 3rd Marquess of Bute as a Conservative newspaper. In 1893, the original building in St. Mary Street was destroyed by fire and a new building was opened also in St Mary Street two years later.

In 1928 the Western Mail Ltd amalgamated with David Duncan & Sons, who published the South Wales Daily News and the South Wales Echo, which was established in 1884. The merged company became Western Mail and Echo Ltd. and because of the merger Evening Express and South Wales Daily News closed. In 1960, the newspapers left St Mary Street and moved to Thomson House, Cardiff.

On 1 October 2007 Western Mail and Echo Ltd changed its name to Media Wales, and in 2008 Media Wales moved from Thomson House in Havelock Street to a newly built office block, named Six Park Street, next to the old building.

The printing plant relocated to Portmanmoor Road, where it printed the Western Mail, South Wales Echo, South Wales Evening Post and the Llanelli Star. It also printed other independently owned titles, including the Pembrokeshire Herald. In November 2016, the parent company Trinity Mirror (Reach plc), announced its plans to close the printing plant and transfer all printing to either its printing plants in Birmingham or Watford.

== WalesOnline ==
WalesOnline is the Media Wales website for Welsh news. Its editor is Steffan Rhys.

=== CardiffOnline ===
Cardiff Online is Media Wales' portal for news from the country's capital. The different sections include information on local community news, yourCardiff, lifestyle, Parklife (local sport), Cardiff Blues, Cardiff City F.C. and Cardiff Devils.

=== Pizzaman ===
Pizzaman is Wales' first online drama series, broadcast by WalesOnline. The mini-series was created by former film students Teilo Trimble and James Robson, who took inspiration from Robson's stint as a takeaway driver following graduation.

It featured 15 short films ranging between four and eight minutes, all shot in different locations around Cardiff, which follow student deliveryman Taj. Each episode is named after a district of Cardiff.

== Publications ==
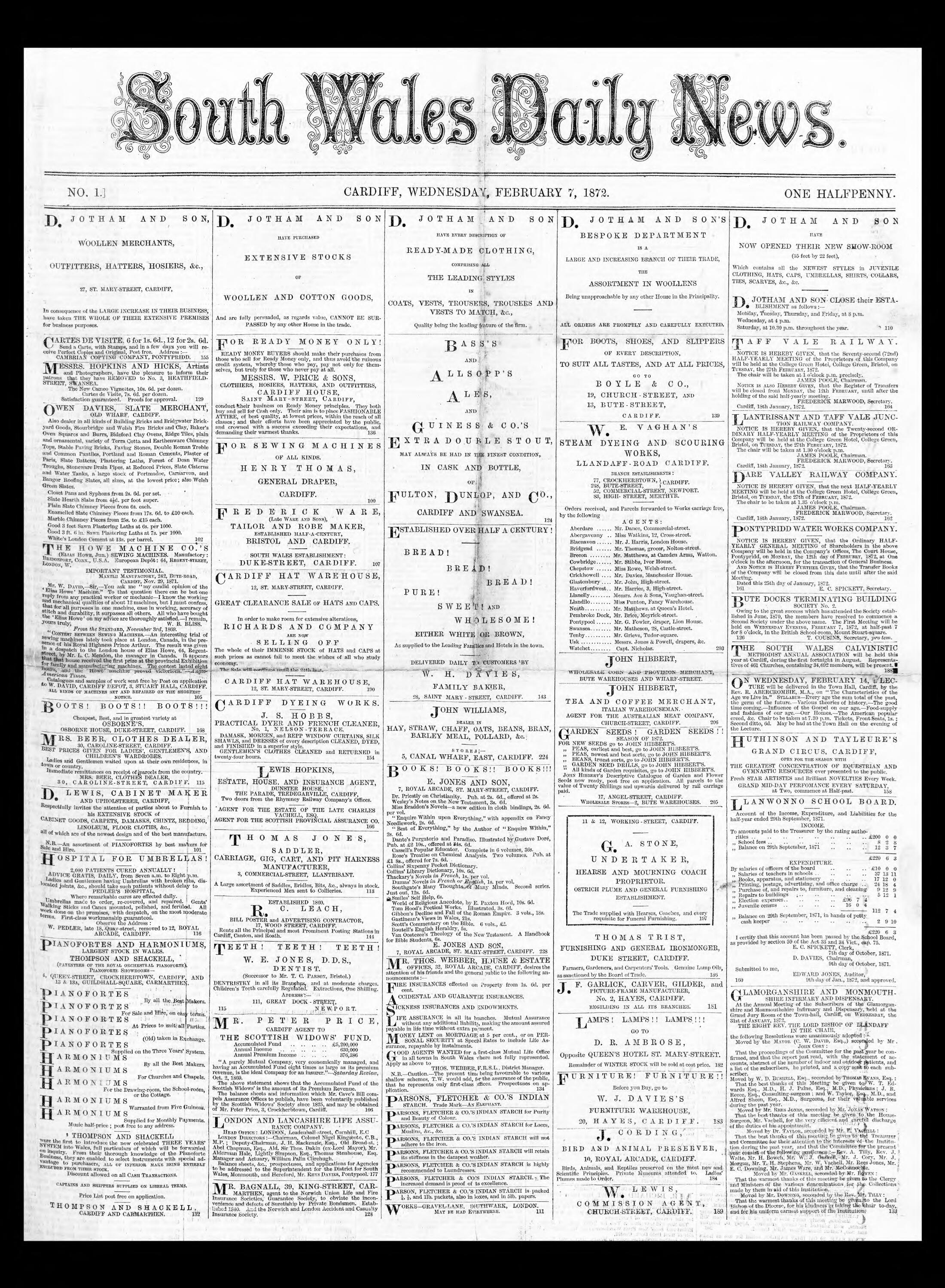
Front page of the earliest surviving copy of the Welsh newspaper South Wales Daily News; 7 February 1872

The company also operates several news websites focused on Welsh news and classified advertising.

Media Wales titles are published by Trinity Mirror North West & North Wales, part of Reach plc and include:

- Monday to Saturday:
  - Western Mail
  - South Wales Echo
  - South Wales Evening Post
- Weekly:
  - Wales on Sunday
  - Llanelli Star
  - Carmarthen Journal
  - Echo Extra formerly Cardiff Post
- Celtic Weekly Newspapers:
  - Cynon Valley Leader
  - Glamorgan Gazette
  - Gwent Gazette
  - Merthyr Express
  - Pontypridd & Llantrisant Observer
  - Rhondda Leader
  - Rhymney Valley Express
- JobsWales

== Gallery ==
Former offices and plants

Western Mail and South Wales Echo head offices, St Mary Street, 1958

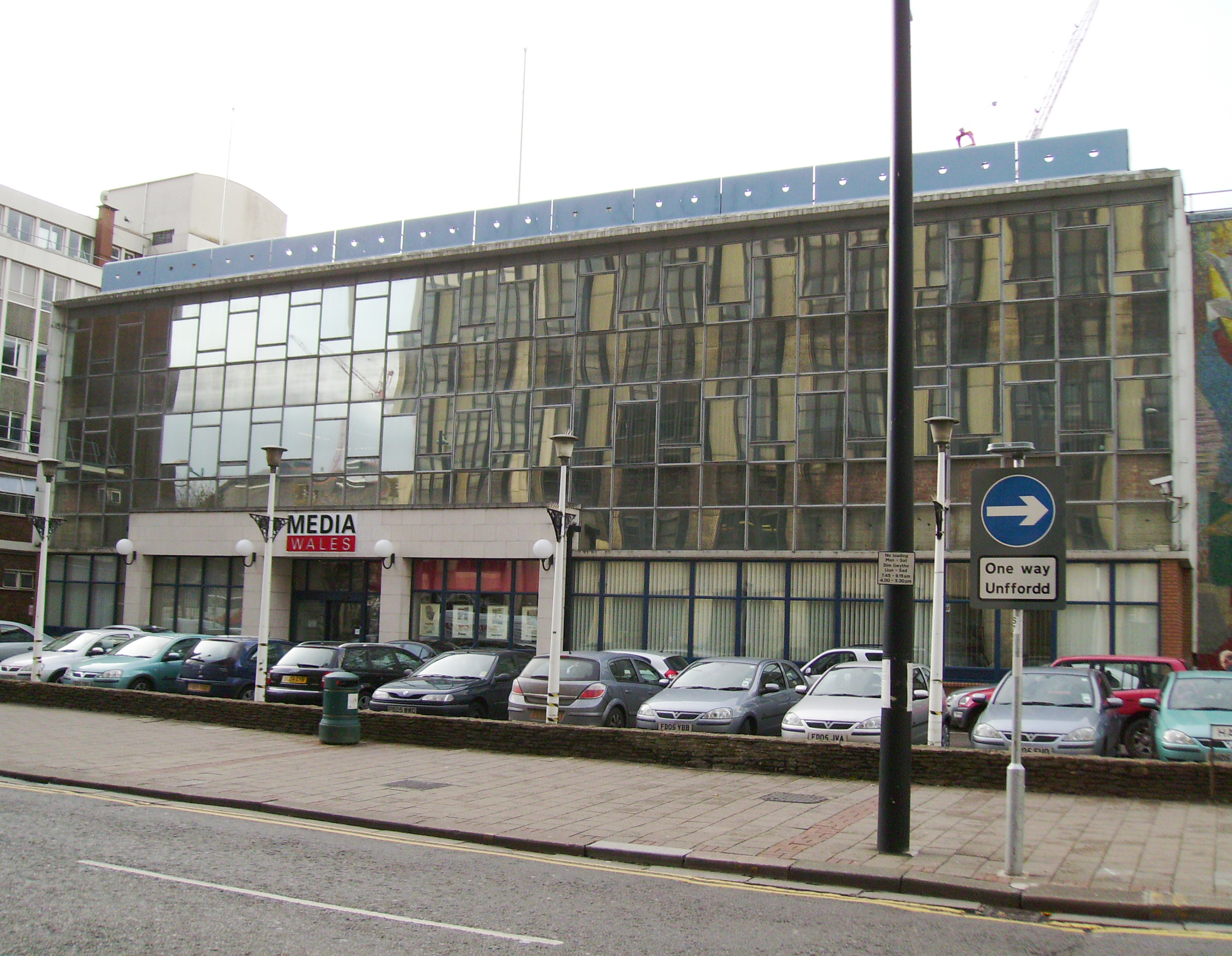
Media Wales, printing plant and main offices, Thomson House, Havelock Street, Cardiff, Wales 2007

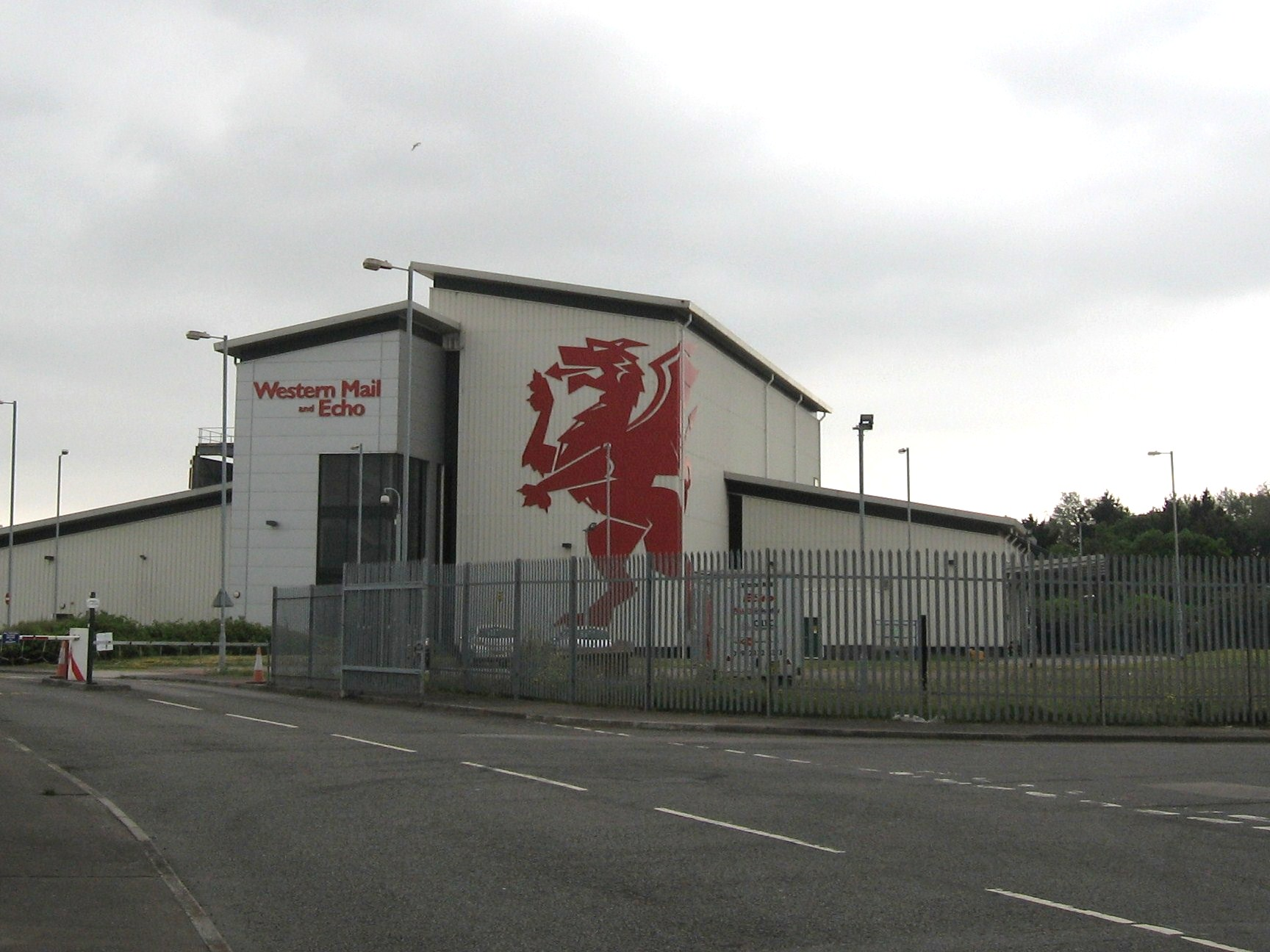
Western Mail and Echo printing plant, Portmanmoor Road, 2012
