= South Wales Evening Post =

Welsh newspaper

- Type: Daily newspaper
- Format: Tabloid
- Owner: Reach plc
- Editor: Jonathan Roberts
- Founded: 1893 as the South Wales Daily Post
- Language: English / Welsh
- Headquarters: Swansea, United Kingdom
- Circulation: 5,471 (as of 2023)
- ISSN: 0307-5672
- Website: walesonline.co.uk

The South Wales Evening Post is a tabloid daily newspaper distributed in the South West region of Wales. The paper has three daily editions – Swansea; Neath and Port Talbot; and Carmarthenshire – and is published by Media Wales, part of the Reach plc group. The current editor is Jonathan Roberts. As the name suggests, it had previously been an evening paper, but later became a morning daily.

== History ==
Founded in 1893 as the South Wales Daily Post, the paper changed its name in 1932 to the current title. Former journalists included poet Dylan Thomas, who joined from school in 1930 but left 18 months later to become freelance.

In August 2006, according to the ABC figures, the South Wales Evening Post overtook the Cardiff-based South Wales Echo as the biggest-selling evening newspaper in Wales.

Presently the Post is published six days a week by Media Wales, which also publishes the Carmarthen Journal, Neath Port Talbot Courier, and Llanelli Star. The Evening Post produces a range of special features and supplements on entertainment, TV, motoring, property, employment and sport.

In 2012, Local World acquired owner Northcliffe Media from Daily Mail and General Trust.

In 2013 the paper gained national attention during the 2013 Swansea measles epidemic as it had previously led a campaign against the vaccine after misunderstanding Andrew Wakefield's research.

== See also ==
- List of newspapers in Wales
- 2013 Swansea measles epidemic
