= Pulse Polio =

Indian governmental immunisation campaign

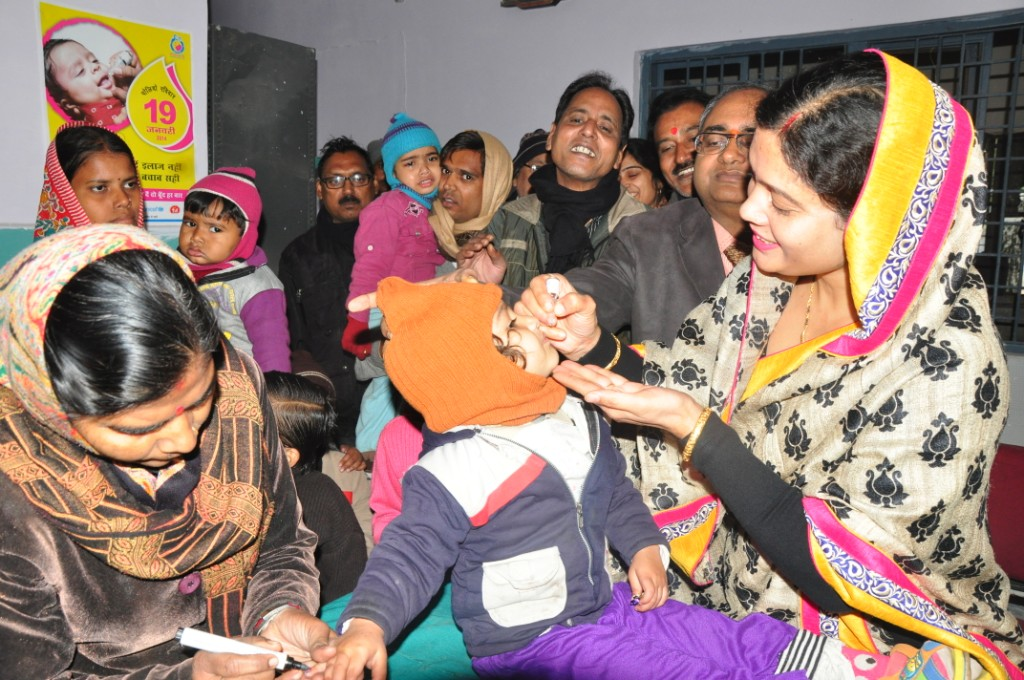
A child is vaccinated on Pulse Polio Day in Gwalior.

Pulse Polio is an immunisation campaign established by the government of India to eliminate poliomyelitis (polio) in India by vaccinating all children under the age of five years against the polio virus. The project fights polio through a large-scale, pulse vaccination programme and monitoring for poliomyelitis cases.

== History ==
In India, vaccination against polio started in around 1972 with Expanded Programme on Immunization (EPI). By 1999, it covered around 60% of infants, giving three doses of OPV to each.

In 1985, the Universal Immunization Programme (UIP) was launched to cover all the districts of the country. UIP became a part of child survival and safe motherhood program (CSSM) in 1992 and Reproductive and Child Health Program (RCH) in 1997 . This program led to a significant increase in coverage, up to 5%. The number of reported cases of polio also declined from thousands during 1987 to 42 in 2010.

In 1995, following the Global Polio Eradication Initiative of the World Health Organization (1988), India launched Pulse Polio immunization program with Universal Immunization Program which aimed at 100% coverage.

The last reported cases of wild polio in India were in West Bengal and Gujarat on 13 January 2011. On 27 March 2014, the World Health Organization (WHO) declared India a polio free country, since no cases of wild polio had been reported in India for five years.

== Preventive Pulse Polio ==
The Pulse Polio Immunization (PPI) aims at covering every individual in India. It aspires to reach even children in remote communities through an improved social mobilisation plan.

- Not a single child should miss the immunization and leaving no chance of polio occurrence.
- Cases of acute flaccid paralysis (AFP) to be reported in time and stool specimens of them to be collected within 14 days. Outbreak response immunisation (ORI) to be conducted as early as possible.
- Maintaining a high level of surveillance.
- Performance of good mop-up operations where polio has disappeared.

== Steps involved ==
- Set up of booths in all parts of India.
- Initialising walk-in cold rooms, freezer rooms, deep freezers, ice-lined refrigerators and cold boxes for a steady supply of vaccine to booths.
- Arranging employees, volunteers, and vaccines.
- Ensuring vaccine vial monitor on each vaccine vial.
- Immunising children with OPV on national immunisation days.
- Identifying missing children from immunisation process.
- Surveillance of efficiency.

Publicity was extensive and included replacing the national telecoms' authority ringtone with a vaccination day awareness message, posters, TV and cinema spots, parades, rallies, and one-to-one communication from volunteers. Vaccination booths were set up, with a house-to-house campaign for remote communities.

== Difficulties ==
Testing showed that three doses of vaccine was enough to protect children in developed countries, but it became obvious that this was not enough in some areas of India. The Ministry of Health and Family Welfare recommended eight to ten doses for each child.

Children in some areas of India are weaker and often had diarrhea, which reduced the efficiency of the vaccine. Open defecation, monsoon flooding, and a lack of water treatment made it easier for a child to swallow more polio virus. As a result, children with too few doses of vaccine were not fully protected and sometimes got polio.

The eradication program therefore gave drops over and over again, to boost children's immunity higher and as a precaution against missed children. Few parents initially knew that the vaccination campaign was trying to eradicate the disease, so they did not understand the reasons for the increasing intensity of vaccination. The increasing frequency of the drops and cases of polio among partially vaccinated children, caused rumours that the drops did not work.

On July 30, 2013 a nine-month-old boy from Navi Mumbai tested positive for vaccine-derived poliovirus (VDPV) type 2. This was the fourth such case recorded in the country in 2013.

Many parts of India are remote and hard to access. People in some areas had had poor and caste-discriminatory treatment by government health authorities, which made them less willing to assist in the vaccination programme. The time demands of polio vaccination sometimes left health care workers with less time for other services. The absence of any free health services other than polio vaccination and contraception lead to rumours that the drops caused infertility.

Rumours about vaccinations varied by area, but were clustered, so that there was a greater risk of a cluster of unvaccinated children. Some believed that vaccinating newborns, children who are ill, or previously vaccinated children was not safe; the last polio case in India was a girl who had not been vaccinated because she was sick. There were also rumours that the polio drops were made from the blood of pigs, dogs, or mice, or from pig fat.

Poor participation of doctors and nurses, difficulty in maintaining and procuring vaccine, difficulty in procuring vehicles, and a lack of support from community members have caused problems in the program, as has fatigue at the length of the anti-polio campaign.

== Support ==
The campaign was supported by organisations including the Indian federal and state governments, international institutions, and non-governmental organisations. It is part of the Global Polio Eradication Initiative, spearheaded by Rotary International, the World Health Organization, UNICEF, and the U.S. Centers for Disease Control and Prevention.

Actor Amitabh Bachchan volunteered with the campaign, filming TV and radio spots urging against complacency and personally vaccinating children.

The Indian and Afghan cricket teams have supported their national and international polio eradication efforts.

The Pulse Polio Vaccination Campaign in Jharkhand set up 24,334 polio booths across the state. A total of 48,669 polio teams are working towards this goal.

== Correlation between non-polio acute flaccid paralysis rates with pulse polio frequency in India ==
A study observing data till the end of 2017 correlates non-polio acute flaccid paralysis (AFP) rates with pulse polio frequency in India. To cast a wider net for poliovirus detection and to maximize sensitivity so that every poliomyelitis case is detected, in 2005, the Global Poliomyelitis Eradication Initiative adapted AFP as a surveillance tool and broadened the case definition of AFP in India. The expanded case definition of AFP encompasses causes of nonpolio AFP (NP-AFP), including Guillian-Barré syndrome, transverse myelitis and traumatic neuritis, and ambiguous cases. The WHO is attempting to phase out the use of live oral polio vaccine to eliminate the risk that the active virus in the vaccine could mutate into a form that can harm unvaccinated children.

== See also ==
- Polio
- Eradication of polio
- Healthcare in India
- Vaccination
- Polio Vaccine
- Pulse vaccination strategy
- Polio v/s Polio victims, documentary about the campaign
