= Cocooning =

Cocooning may refer to:

- Cocooning (behaviour), staying inside one's home
- Cocooning (immunization), vaccination strategy
- Cocooning (aircraft), practice of coating stored equipment or machinery
