= Llanelli Star =

Welsh regional newspaper

- Type: Weekly newspaper
- Format: Tabloid
- Owner(s): Trinity Mirror
- Editor: Jonathan Roberts
- Founded: 9/10/1909
- Political alignment: None
- Circulation: 1,923 (as of 2023)
- Website: walesonline.co.uk/all-about/llanelli

The Llanelli Star is a Welsh regional newspaper covering the areas of Llanelli and Carmarthen in the county of Carmarthenshire, Wales. It is published on a weekly basis in a tabloid form. The newspaper is published by Trinity Mirror, the same company behind the South Wales Evening Post. In 2012, Local World acquired South West Wales Publications owner Northcliffe Media from Daily Mail and General Trust. Geoffrey Lloyd was the editor from 1965 to his death in 1986.

== Office closure ==
In December 2017, it was announced that the Llanelli Star office in Cowell Street, Llanelli was to close down.

== Editions ==
The Llanelli Star has a sister paper, the Carmarthen Journal. The Star was originally published on a Thursday, but both are now published on Wednesdays. The two papers have different formats and news content which varies by area.

The Llanelli Star covers the district of Llanelli and the Gwendraeth Valley where the Carmarthen Journal covers the town of Carmarthen and also the Gwendraeth Valley.

== Sub-Editions ==
=== of the Llanelli Star ===
- There are three editions of the Llanelli Star, the main Llanelli edition, the Burry Port edition and the Gwendraeth Valley edition which was re-launched in late 2011.

=== of the Carmarthen Journal ===
- Town
- Gwendraeth
- Cardigan
- Llandeilo
- Lampeter
- Whitland
