= Ron Davies (photographer) =

Welsh photographer

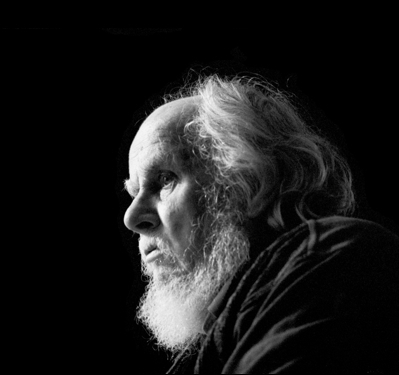
- Ron Davies
- Born: 17 December 1921; Aberaeron, Wales, United Kingdom
- Died: 26 October 2013 (aged 91)
- Occupation: Photographer

Ron Davies, OBE (17 December 1921 – 26 October 2013) was a Welsh photographer.

== Life and work ==
Davies was born in Aberaeron, Wales. He developed an interest in photography at the age of 8, while working as an errand boy for a chemist shop in his home town.

During WWII, Davies became an official war photographer on the staff of Air Information with the South East Asia command of the Royal Air Force, stationed in India, the Dutch East Indies and British Malaya. In 1950, Davies was injured in an accident on his motorcycle combination, and consequently used a wheelchair for the rest of his life, though this didn't prevent him pursuing his chosen career.

He worked as a still and cine press photographer for HTV, the BBC, the Western Mail, Y Cymro and various national newspapers, and produced much private work and mounted many exhibitions. He also took a keen and active interest in teaching photography, and was the driving force behind the first mobile disabled darkroom, operated by Arts Care/Gofal Celf.

In 2003, Davies was awarded the OBE for his services to photography, and the year before he was accepted into the Welsh National Eisteddfod's Bardic Circle.

Davies died on 26 October 2013, aged 91.

== Publications ==
- Llun A Chân, 1983, ISBN 0-85088-539-6
- 24 Awr Bronglais: Bywyd mewn diwrnod, Bronglais: 24 hours – A life in the day of, 1988, exhibition catalogue
- Delweddau O Gymru/Images Of Wales, 1990, ISBN 0-86243-226-X
- The Seven Wonders of Wales, 1993, ISBN 0-86243-292-8
- Byd Ron/Ron's World, 2001, ISBN 1-86225-032-4
