= Fred Jones (footballer, born 1938) =

Welsh footballer

Personal information
- Full name: Frederick George Jones
- Date of birth: 11 January 1938
- Place of birth: Gelligaer, Wales
- Date of death: 22 March 2013 (aged 75)
- Height: 5 ft 8 in (1.73 m)
- Position: Outside left

Youth career
- 1955–1956: Pontllanfraith

Senior career*
Years	Team	Apps	(Gls)
1956–1958	Hereford United		
1958	Arsenal	0	(0)
1958–1960	Brighton	69	(14)
1960–1961	Swindon Town	18	(1)
1961–1963	Grimsby Town	58	(9)
1963–1964	Reading	30	(5)
1964–????	Hereford United		
???–1973	Stafford Rangers		

International career
1960	Wales U23	2	
- * Club domestic league appearances and goals

Fred Jones (11 January 1938 – 22 March 2013) was a Welsh professional footballer who played as an outside left in the 1950s and early 1960s, and won two caps for his country's under-23 side. After developing in the youth team at Hereford United, he left to join Arsenal in January 1958. He made no first-team competitive appearances for the London club in his nine months there, although he did play in a friendly against Eintracht Frankfurt in February 1958.

In September 1958 he moved on to Brighton & Hove Albion. Spells at Swindon Town and Grimsby Town followed and he finished his League career at Reading.
