= Vaccine-naive =

Resistance of vaccination

The time-course of an immune response begins with the initial pathogen encounter (or initial vaccination) and leads to the formation and maintenance of active immunological memory.

Vaccine-naive is a lack of immunity, or immunologic memory, to a disease because the person has not been vaccinated. There are a variety of reasons why a person may not have received a vaccination, including contraindications due to preexisting medical conditions, lack of resources, previous vaccination failure, religious beliefs, personal beliefs, fear of side-effects, phobias to needles, lack of information, vaccine shortages, physician knowledge and beliefs, social pressure, and natural resistance.

== Effect on herd immunity ==
Communicable diseases, such as measles and influenza, are more readily spread in vaccine-naive populations, causing frequent outbreaks. Vaccine-naive persons threaten what epidemiologists call herd immunity. This is because vaccinations provide not just protection to those who receive them, but also provide indirect protection to those who remain susceptible because of the reduced prevalence of infectious diseases. Fewer individuals available to transmit the disease reduce the incidence of it, creating herd immunity.

== See also ==
- Immune system
- Outbreak
- Pulse vaccination strategy
- Vaccine
