= Cocooning (immunization) =

Vaccination strategy

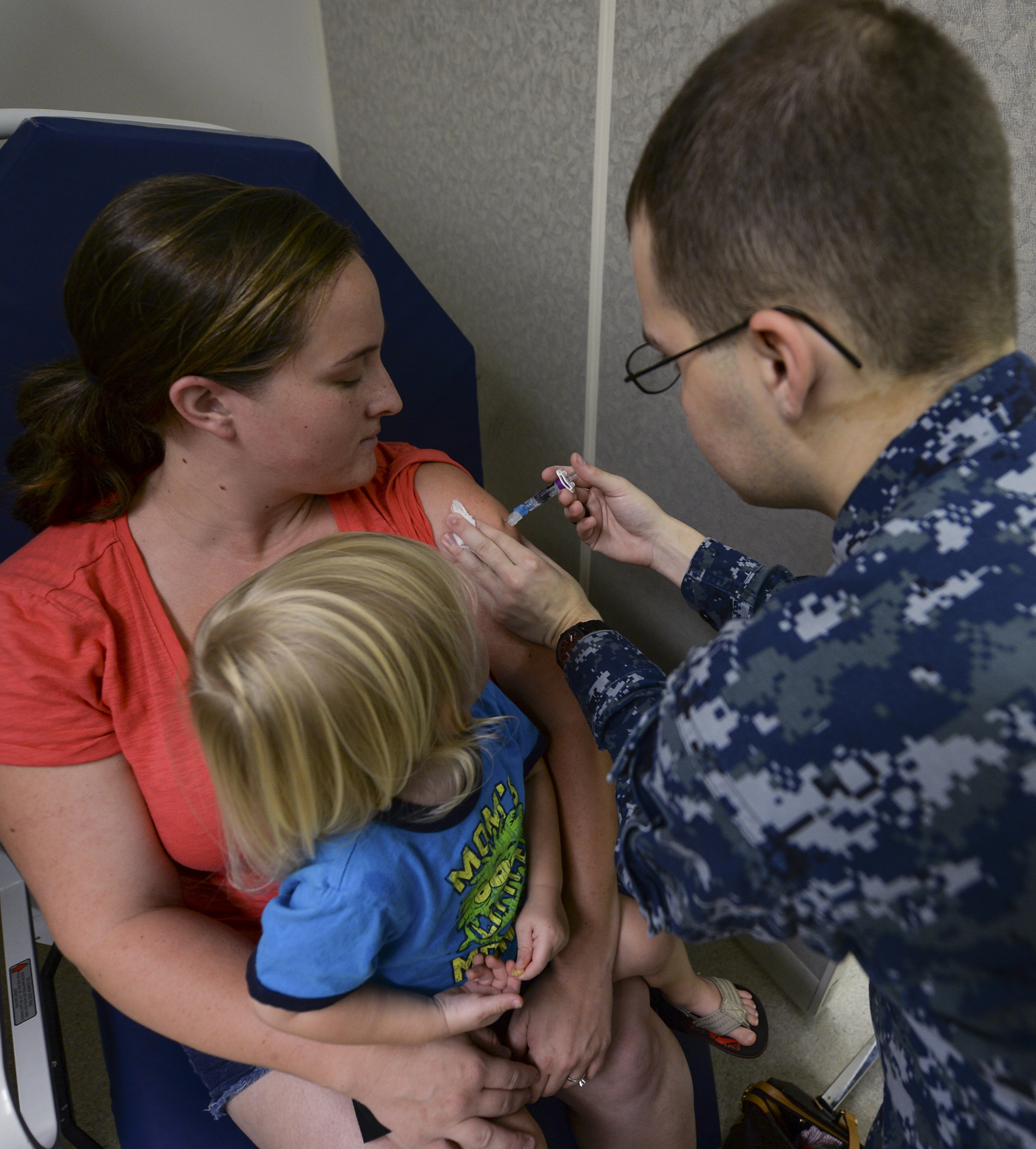
Children generally have close contact with their parents, so children often catch diseases from their parents. This mother's vaccination therefore reduces the risk of infection for the child on her lap.

Cocooning, also known as the Cocoon Strategy, is a vaccination strategy to protect infants and other vulnerable individuals from infectious diseases by vaccinating those in close contact with them. If the people most likely to transmit an infection are immune, their immunity creates a "cocoon" of protection around the newborn (or other vulnerable person).

Cocooning is especially commonly used for pertussis. It aims to protect newborn infants from becoming infected with pertussis by administering DTaP/Tdap (tetanus, diphtheria and acellular pertussis) booster vaccine to parents, family members and any individuals who would come into regular contact with the newborn infant. By vaccinating these individuals with a pertussis booster, a pool of persons is established around the newborn who are themselves protected from getting pertussis and passing it on to the infant, thereby creating a "cocoon" of protection around the newborn. Young infants have the highest rate of pertussis; in 87–100% of all deaths caused by pertussis, the victim is an infant of less than 6 months of age, too young to have finished acquiring vaccine-induced immunity. Adolescents and young adults whose immunity has just worn off are often infected, but very unlikely to die. They can, however, infect others. 35% to 68% of infants infected with pertussis are infected by a close contact, most commonly the mother. Cocooning prevents about 20% of infant pertussis cases; vaccination during pregnancy prevents more (33%).

== Rationale ==
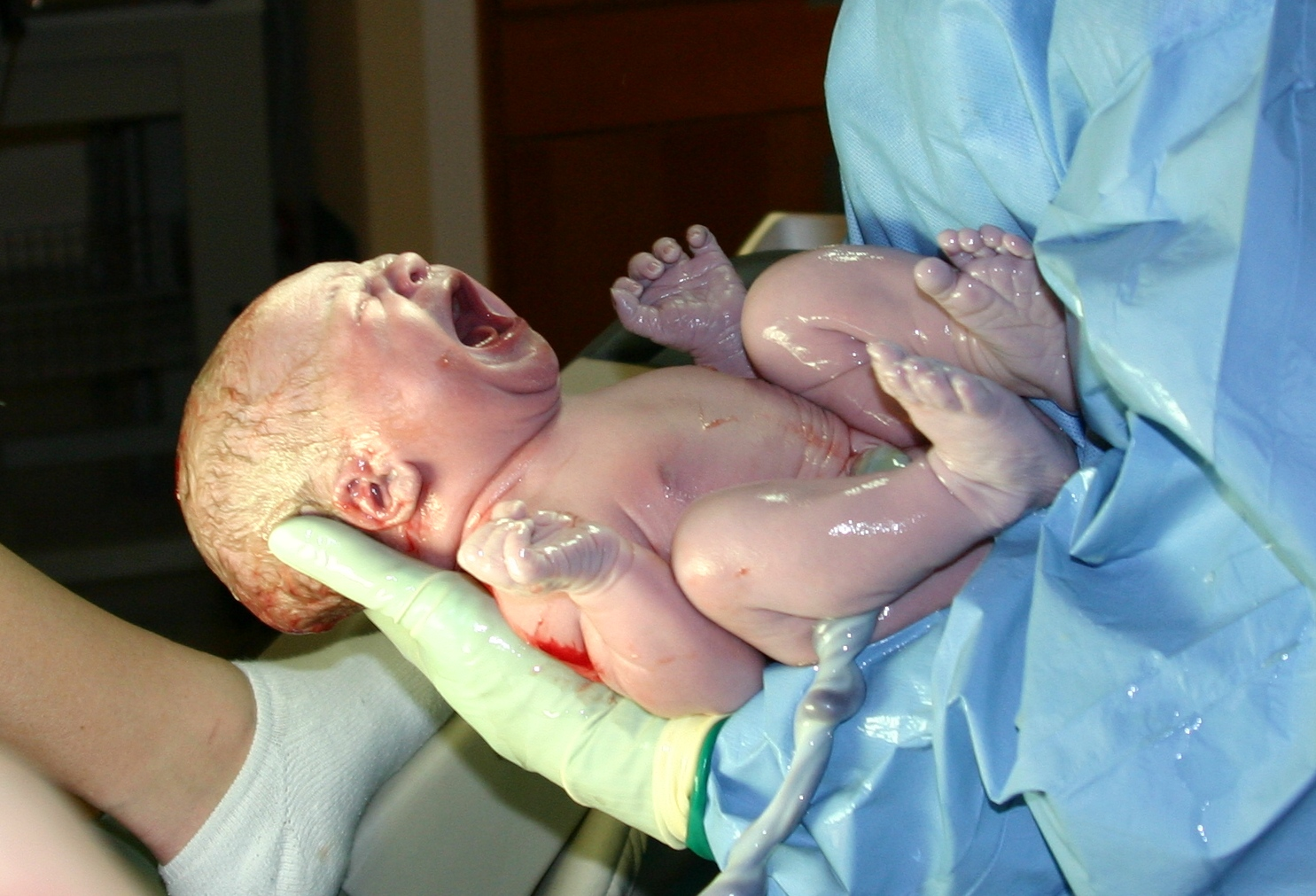
A newborn has very little immunity to viruses

Some people cannot be fully protected from vaccine-preventable diseases by direct vaccination. These are often people with weak immune systems, who are more likely to get seriously ill. Their risk of infection can be significantly reduced if those who are most likely to infect them get the appropriate vaccines.

Vaccination works by training the immune system to react promptly to an infection, warding off illness (acquired immunity). People with weak immune systems may have difficulty acquiring and retaining immunity.

A baby's immune system is not yet fully developed. Babies are more likely to have serious complications or die from diseases, even diseases that have milder effects in adults. A baby can use some antibodies from the mother, transmitted in the womb. For this reason, it is recommended that people who are expecting to become pregnant get some vaccines, and those who are pregnant get others. However, this maternal protection wears off after a few months. Breastfeeding also offers protection, but is not as effective as vaccination at preventing some diseases.

Some people have compromised immune systems. The immune system can be compromised by congenital medical conditions, infectious diseases, non-infectious conditions such as cancer, and immunosuppressive medications or treatments (for instance, people with organ transplants take drugs to prevent their immune system from killing the transplant). People who are severely immuno-compromised may not be able to take some vaccines; on the other hand, they may be much more severely affected by an infection. If the people they share a house with are immune, this provides them with significant protection. They benefit when their housemates get all the recommended inactivated vaccines. They also benefit if their housemates get many attenuated vaccines. However, some attenuated vaccines are not recommended for people living with immuno-compromised people, depending on the vaccine and cause of immune suppression.

Some vaccines require multiple doses, spaced over time, to be effective. Those who have not yet received all the doses (including all young babies) are not yet fully immune, and rely on the immunity of those around them. Some vaccines also require booster doses in later life; those who have not received their booster doses can be infected and infect others.

Some people are also unable to take some vaccines due to an allergic reaction.

== Recommendations and use ==
Cocooning is widely recommended. Cocooning for pertussis has been recommended by the Centers for Disease Control and Prevention (CDC) in the United States since 2006. The World Health Organization, the US Centers for Disease Control and Prevention (CDC), the Global Pertussis Initiative, and the Public Health Agency of Canada all recommend cocooning against pertussis. The Advisory Committee on Immunization Practices (ACIP) has recommended cocooning with Tdap vaccine since 2005 and has continued to recommend this strategy for all those with expected close contact with infants. ACIP states that cocooning provides maximum protection to the infant beyond what is provided by maternal vaccination. ACIP is recommending that all relatives and caregivers get vaccinated against pertussis at least two weeks before coming into contact with infants. While acceptance of cocooning is high, implementation in not yet widespread as of 2012.

== See also ==
- Ring vaccination
- Herd immunity
