= John Hughes (ceramicist) =

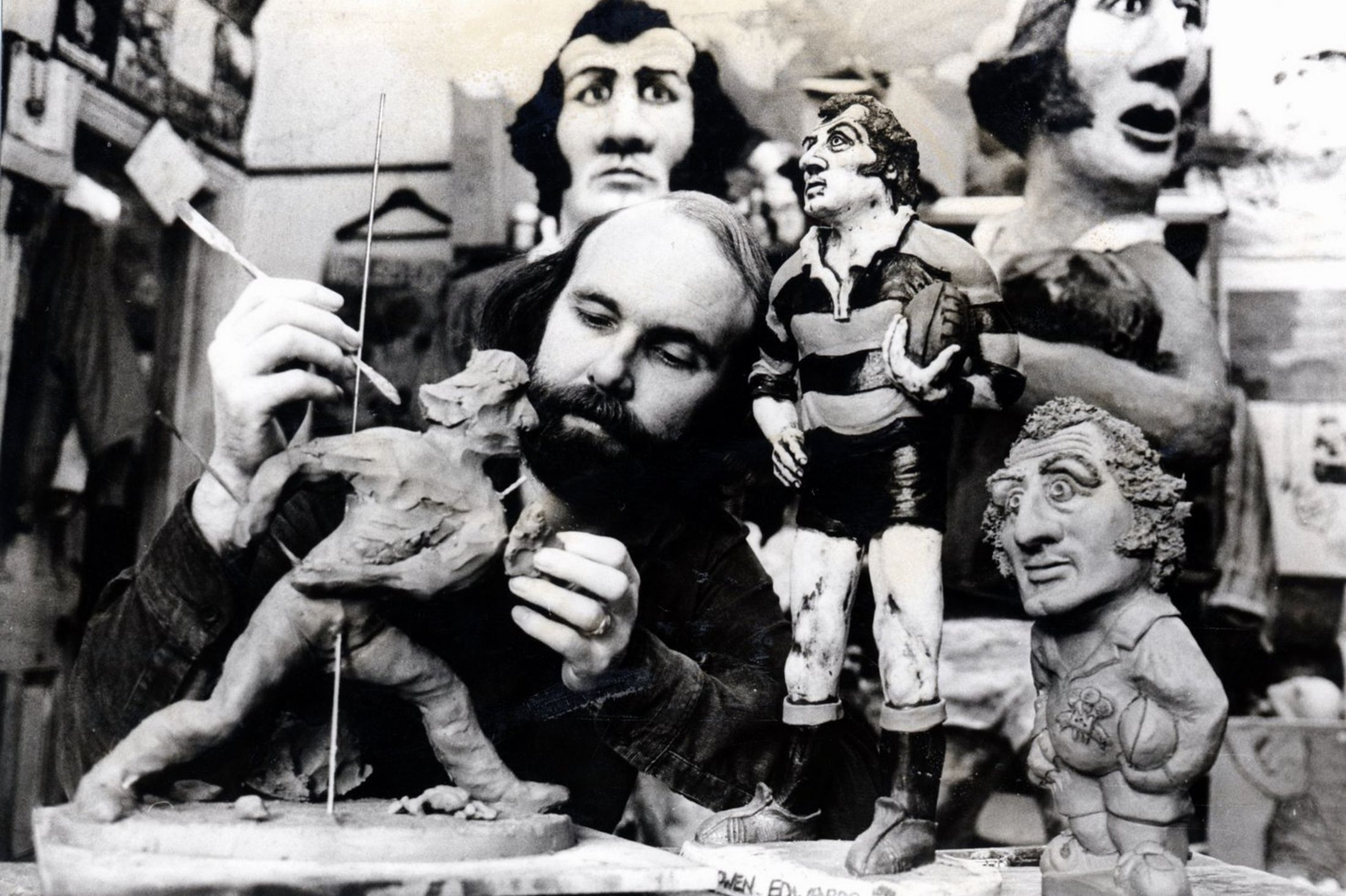
Hughes at work during the 1970s

John Percival Hughes, MBE (23rd February 1934 – 18th June 2013) was a Welsh ceramicist, known for devising and marketing the "Grogg", a range of collectible figurines representing well-known public figures, mostly rugby union players.

Hughes came from Pontypridd and launched his Groggs during the early 1970s when the Wales national rugby union team was at the height of its success and popularity. After operating from his garden shed, making figures of mythical creatures such as dragons and giants of the Mabinogion, he set up in shop in the former Danygraig Arms pub, Broadway, Treforest, and later described his business as "a 45-year overnight success story". He was awarded a MBE by Queen Elizabeth II in the 2010 Birthday Honours. for his services to ceramics in Wales and charitable donations.
