= Grogg =

Caricature figure

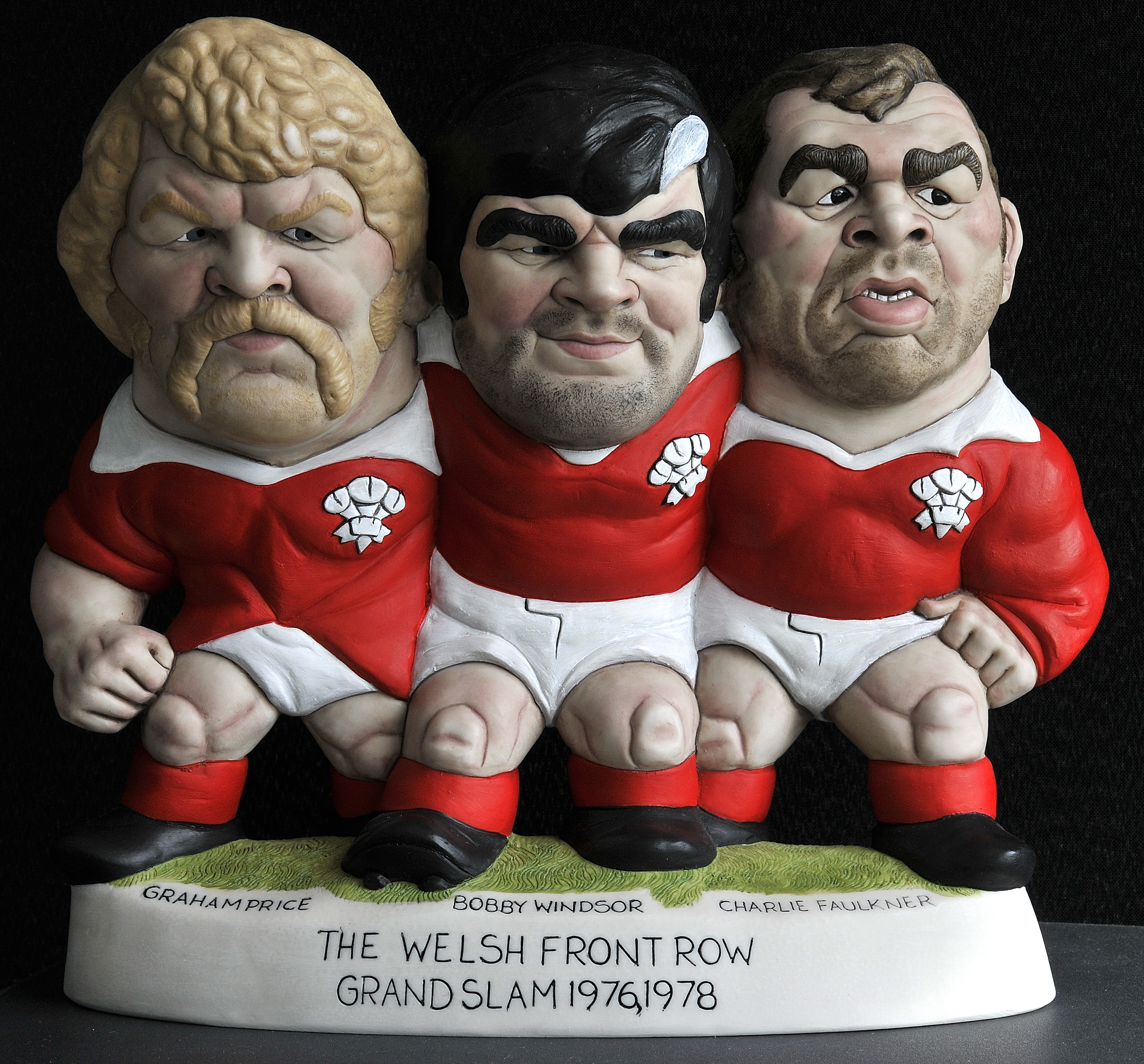
78 Front Row

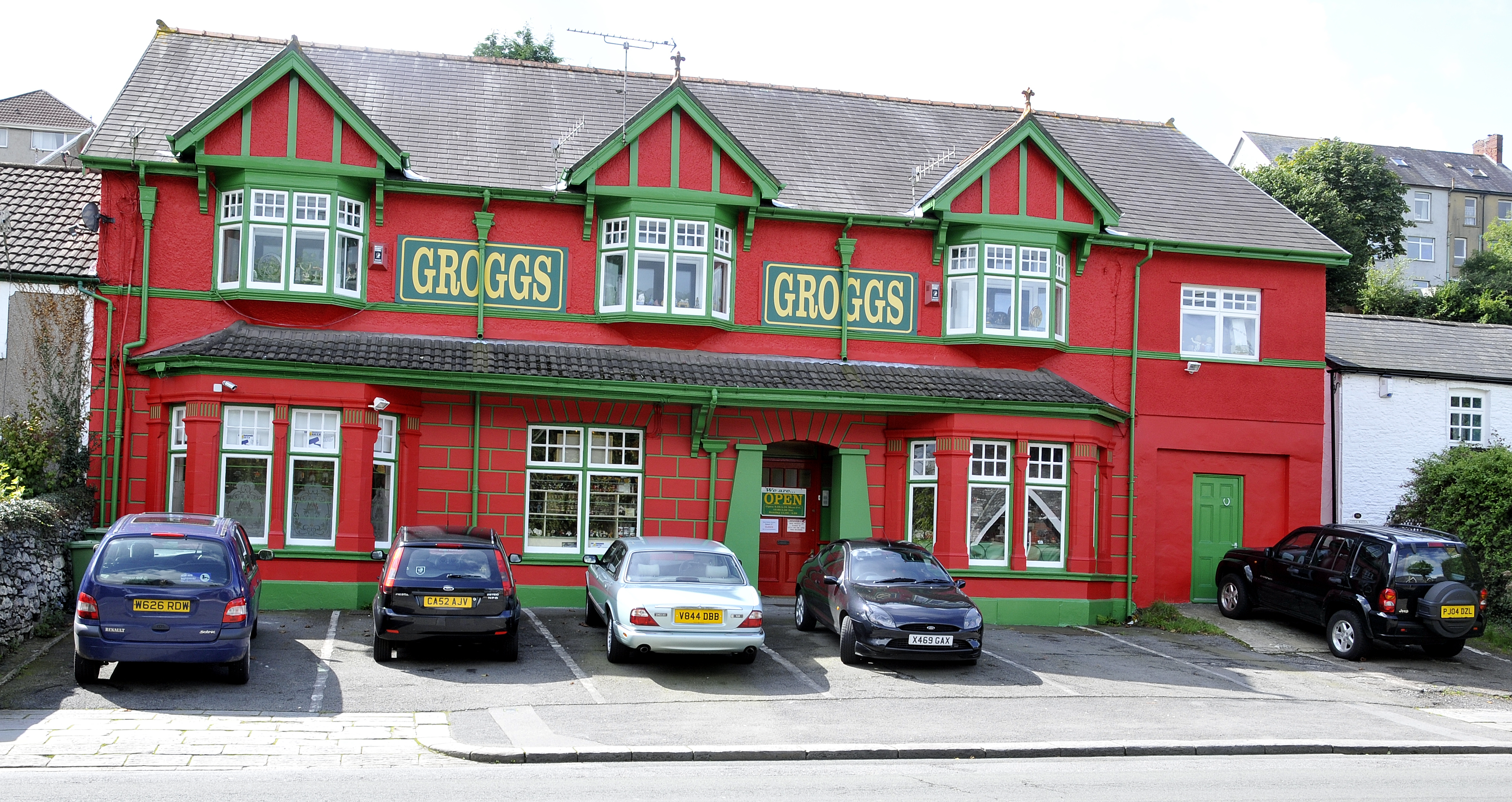
The Groggshop, Treforest

A Grogg is a caricature figure made by the World of Groggs, a ceramics company established by John Hughes in 1965, in Trefforest near Pontypridd, Wales. Most Groggs are 9 inches (230 mm) tall or less and are made of a type of clay called grog. Groggs are usually made of popular Welsh rugby players, Welsh celebrities and the occasional non-Welsh celebrity. Whenever possible the person who is "grogged" is presented with the first Grogg produced. They are moulded and painted by hand and a Grogg can take many weeks from the master copy being made to the first one being painted.

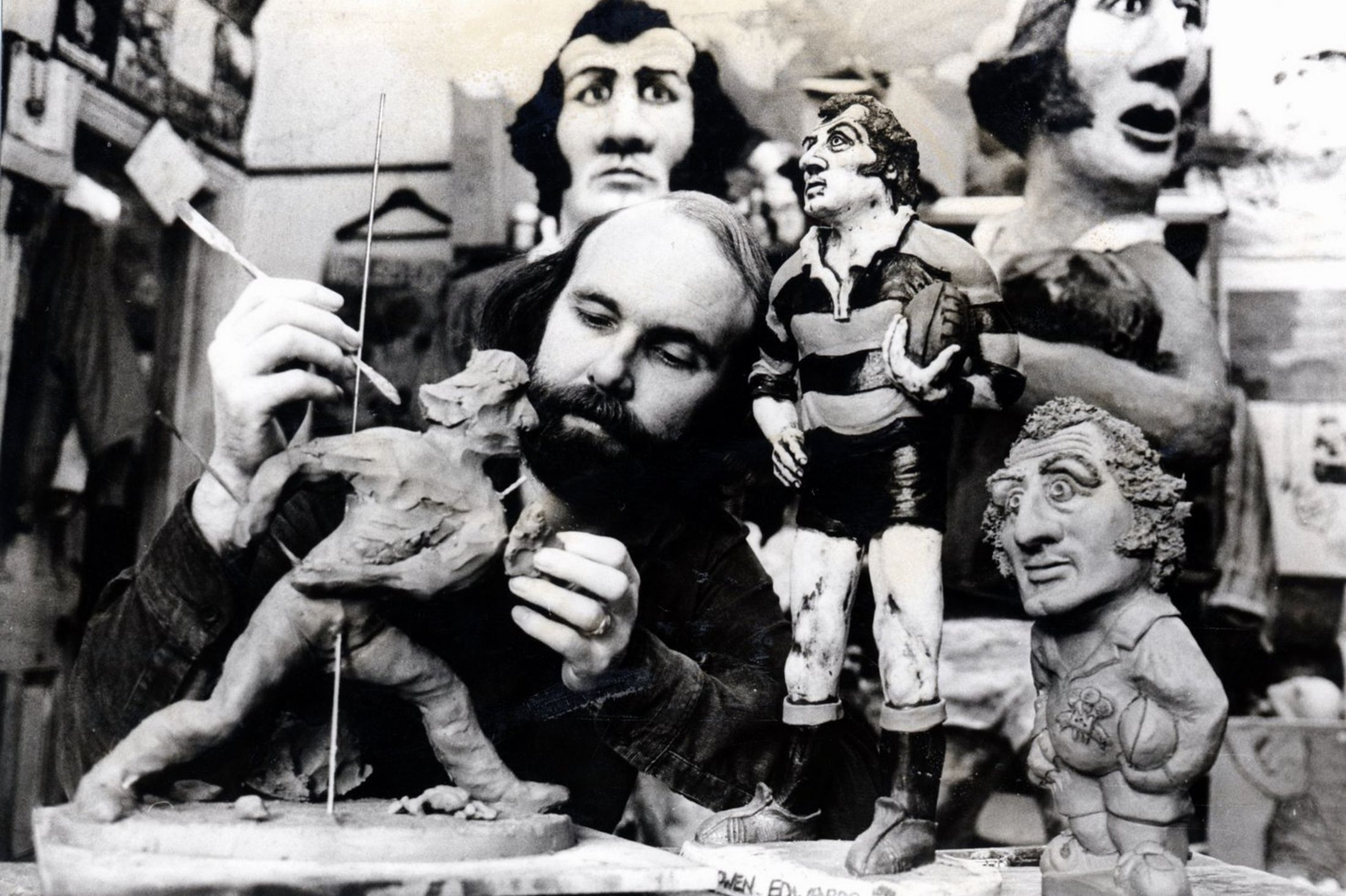
Hughes working during the 70s

== History ==
John Hughes started flirting with ceramics and pottery as early as 1965 with a kiln in his garden shed in the family home on Llantwit Road, Treforest. But it was not till 1967 that his rugby figures were born. In 1971 the family purchased the derelict Dan-y-Graig pub in Treforest near Pontypridd and opened the Groggshop as it was then called. The business remains there to this day. The figures are called Groggs after the type of clay that was originally used to make them.

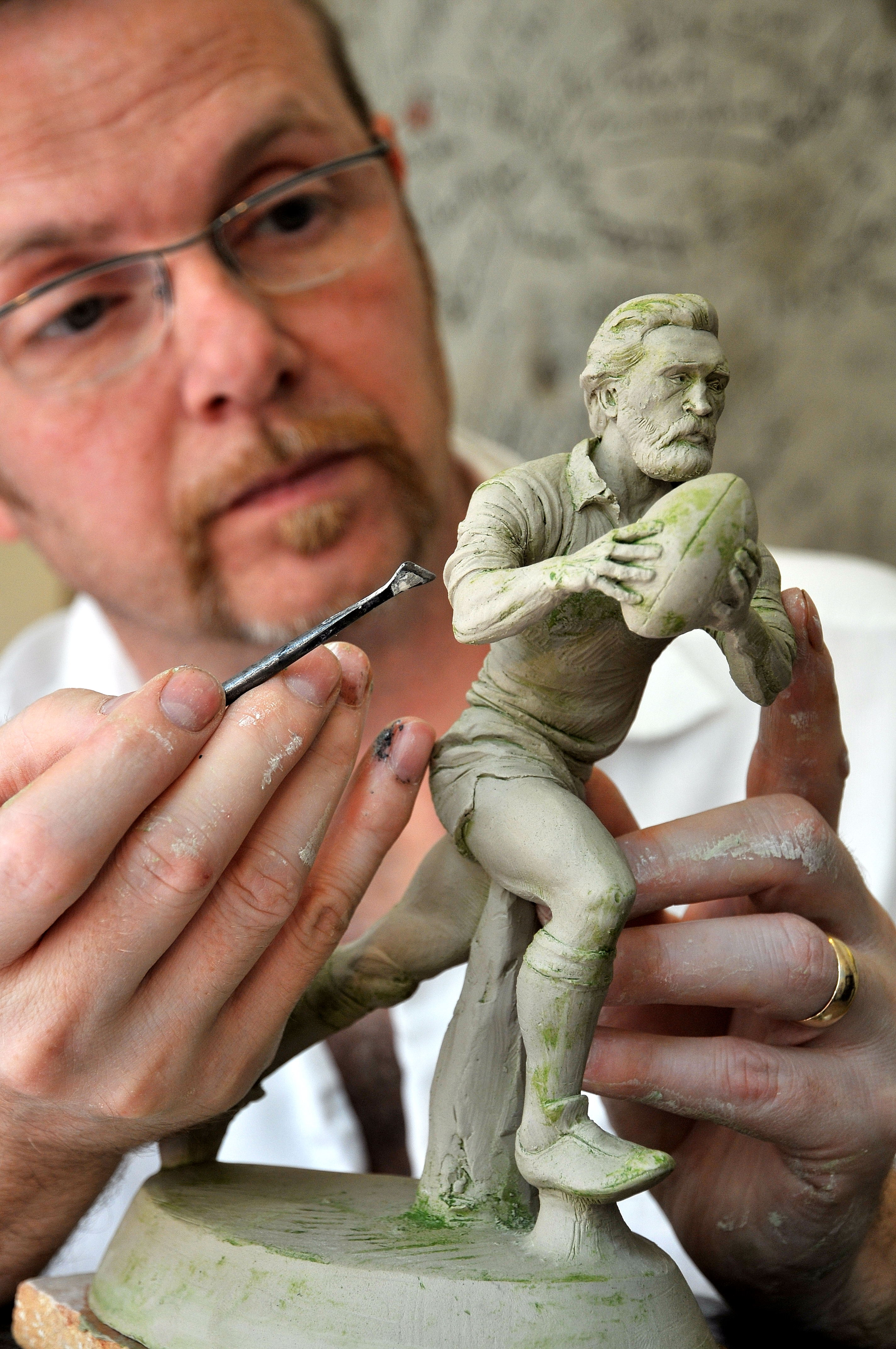
Richard working on Action Ray Gravell

== Production numbers ==
Groggs are usually limited to 300 or 500 pieces, after which the mould is destroyed. In 2005, following Wales' rugby union victory in the six nations by winning the grand slam, a limited edition Grogg was produced to commemorate the event. The production run was limited to 151 pieces, being the number of points Wales scored during the competition. The Grand Slam Grogg sold out within 2 days of going on sale.

== Sponsorship ==
The Hughes family are well-known supporters of Principality Premiership club, Pontypridd RFC, and in 2009, the World of Groggs became official sponsors of the club's website.

== Awards ==
In 2001 the founder of the business and the inventor of the Groggs, John Hughes, was presented with the Chancellor's medal from the University of Glamorgan in recognition of his contribution to Welsh life. He was awarded the MBE in June 2010 for his services to UK ceramics.
