= Pulse vaccination strategy =

Method to eradicate an epidemic by repeatedly vaccinating a group at risk

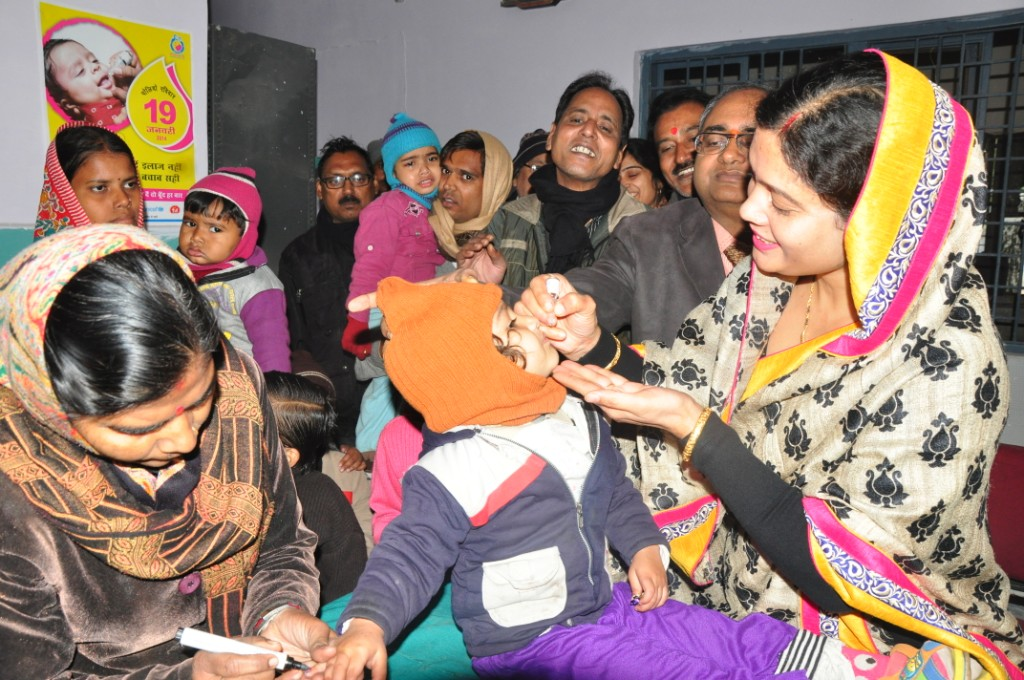
On Pulse Polio Day, a child swallows vaccine drops and is marked as vaccinated (felt-nib pen on finger). The Pulse Polio immunisation campaign eliminated polio from India.

The pulse vaccination strategy is a method used to eradicate an epidemic by repeatedly vaccinating a group at risk, over a defined age range, until the spread of the pathogen has been stopped. It is most commonly used during measles and polio epidemics to quickly stop the spread and contain the outbreak.

== Mathematical model ==
Where T= time units is a constant fraction p of susceptible subjects vaccinated in a relatively short time. This yields the differential equations for the susceptible and vaccinated subjects as

$$\frac{dS}{dt} = \mu N  - \mu S - \beta \frac{I}{N} S, S(n T^+) = (1-p) S(n T^-) n=0,1,2,\dots$$

$$\frac{dV}{dt} = - \mu V,   V(n T^+) = V(n T^-) + p S(n T^-) n=0,1,2,\dots$$

Further, by setting I = 0, one obtains that the dynamics of the susceptible subjects is given by:

$$S^*(t) = 1- \frac{p}{1-(1-p)E^{-\mu T}}E^{-\mu MOD(t,T)}$$

and that the eradication condition is:

$$R_0 \int_{0}^{T}{S^*(t)dt} < 1$$

== See also ==
- Critical community size
- Epidemic model
- Herd immunity
- Pulse Polio
- Ring vaccination
- Vaccine-naive
