= List of quarries served by the Ffestiniog Railway =

The Festiniog Railway served a cluster of quarries around the town of Blaenau Ffestiniog, Wales. Most of these were slate quarries, although granite quarries and zinc mines were also connected by narrow gauge tramways to the railway.

== Map ==
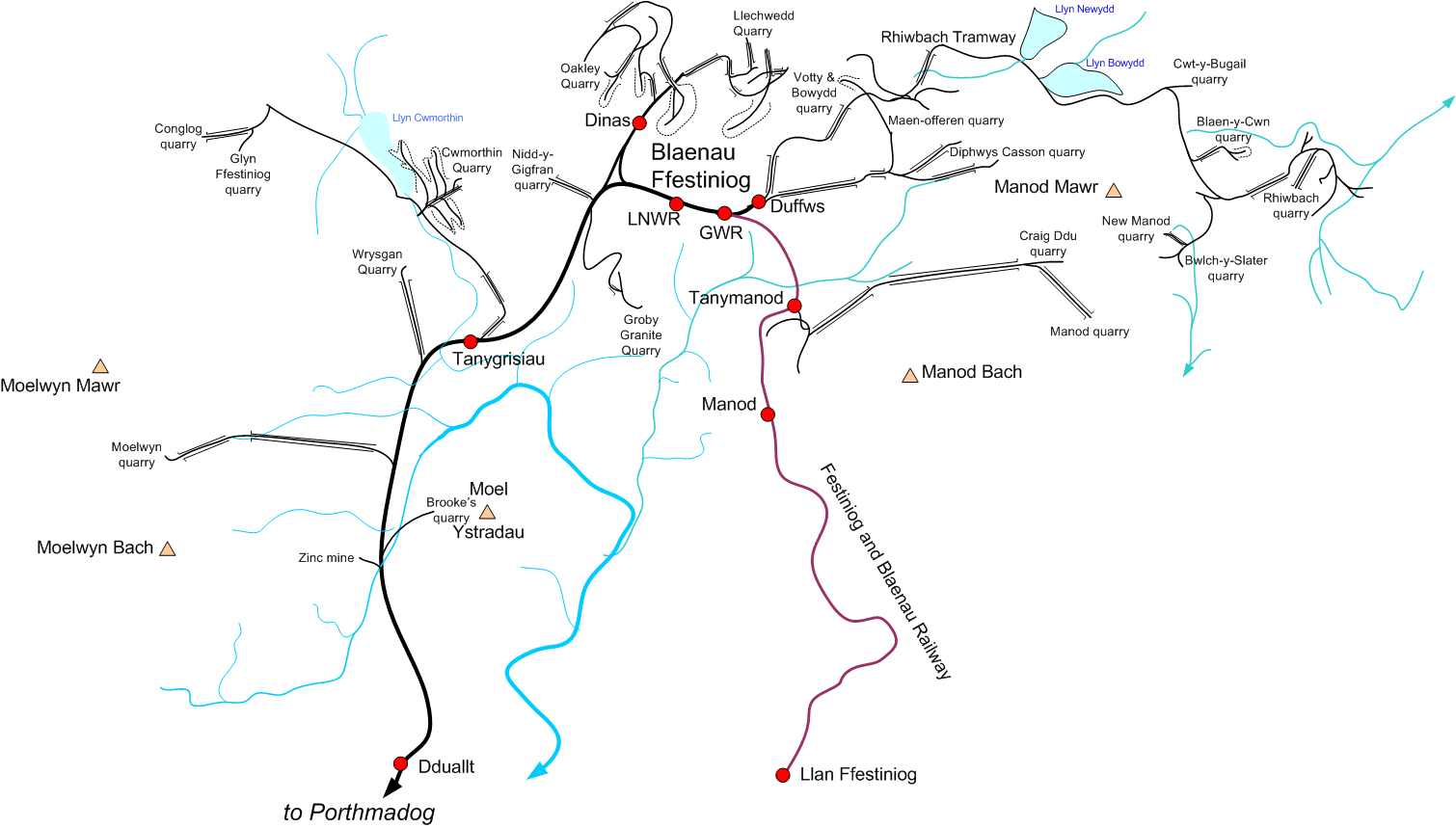
Narrow gauge quarry tramways around Blaenau Ffestiniog. Not all lines shown, not all lines existed at the same time

== The quarries ==
Name	Mineral	Opened	Closed	Years connected	Notes
Blaen y Cwm	Slate	1820	1911	1876–1911	Connected to the FfR via the Rhiwbach Tramway
Bowydd	Slate	1800	1870	1854–1870	Merged with Votty to form Votty & Bowydd quarry
Brooke's	Granite	1919	?	?	Connected by a tramway branching off at the north portal of Moelwyn Tunnel
Bwlch-y-Slater	Slate	1824	1960	1866–1956	Connected via the Rhiwbach Tramway
Cesail	Slate	1827	1877	1836–1877	Became part of the Oakeley Quarry
Conglog	Slate	1872	1920?	1874–1920	Remote quarry connected by the Cwmorthin Tramway
Cwmorthin	Slate	1810	1937	1850–1937	Connected via the Cwmorthin Tramway; became part of the Oakeley quarry in 1900, the two quarries were connected underground
Cwt-y-Bugail	Slate	1835	1972	1867–1961	Last quarry using the (by then partly lifted) Rhiwbach Tramway
Diphwys Casson	Slate	1760	1972	1860–1955	Last of the major quarries to be connected to the Ffestiniog Railway
Graig Ddu	Slate	1840	1946		Connected via the Festiniog and Blaenau Railway
Groby Granite	Granite	1901	Circa 1932	1914-c.1932	Connected by a short, steeply graded branch worked by FfR locomotives.
Hafodty (Votty)	Slate	1801	1870	1851–1870	Joined with Bowydd quarry to form Votty & Bowydd
Llechwedd	Slate	1846	Present	1848-1980s	Currently worked on a small scale and the site of the Llechwedd Slate Caverns tourist attraction
Maenofferen	Slate	1848	1999	1848–1975	Became the major owner of quarries connected via inclines at Duffws station, continued to use the stub of the FfR through Blaenau into the mid 1970s. Untopping operations continue in 2007.
Nyth-y-Gigfran	Slate	1840s	1882	1867–1882	Sometimes known as Glan-y-Pwll quarry. Became part of the Oakeley Quarry
Matthews (Rhiwbryfdir)	Slate	1825	1871	1842–1871	Became part of the Oakeley quarry
Manod	Slate	c1850	Present	1866-1930s	Sometimes known as Bwlch y Slaters and now given the name Cwt y Bugail. Connected to the Festiniog by the Rhiwbach Tramway
Moelwyn Slate	Slate	1826	c 1900	1867–c 1900	Remote quarry connected to the FfR by a series of seven inclines; worked intermittently and never successfully.
Moelwyn Zinc	Zinc, Manganese and Silver	c1892	by 1919	1892-by 1919	Zinc mine just west of the north portal of the old Moelwyn Tunnel.
Oakeley	Slate	1878	2010	1878-1950s	Formed by the amalgamation of the Cesail, Matthews and Glan-y-Pwll quarries. Was the largest single quarry in Blaenau Ffestiniog. Was the home of the Gloddfa Ganol tourist attraction in the 1980s and 1990s. Now worked as an open pit by Alfred McAlpine Ltd.
Rhiwbach	Slate	1812	1953	1860–1953	Remote quarry situated 4 miles (6.4 km) east of Duffws station and connected via the Rhiwbach Tramway
Syenite Setts	Granite	1874	1916	?	Quarry later worked as Brooke's
Votty & Bowydd	Slate	1870	1964	1870–1962	Formed by the amalgamation of the Hafodty and Bowydd quarries.
Wrysgan	Slate	1830s	1946	1844–1946	Connected to the railway near Tanygrisiau via a single long incline ending in a tunnel.

== Images ==
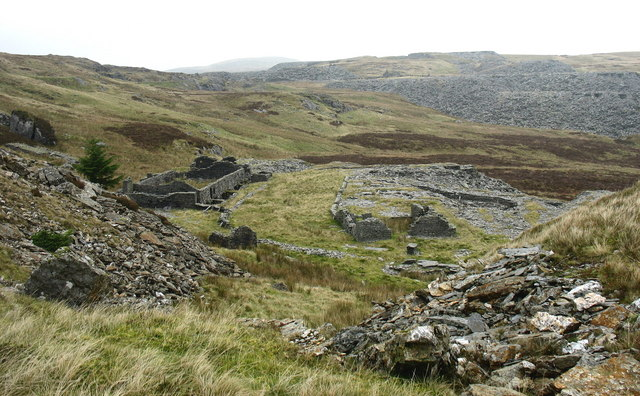
The ruined mill at Blaen-y-Cwm, in 2005

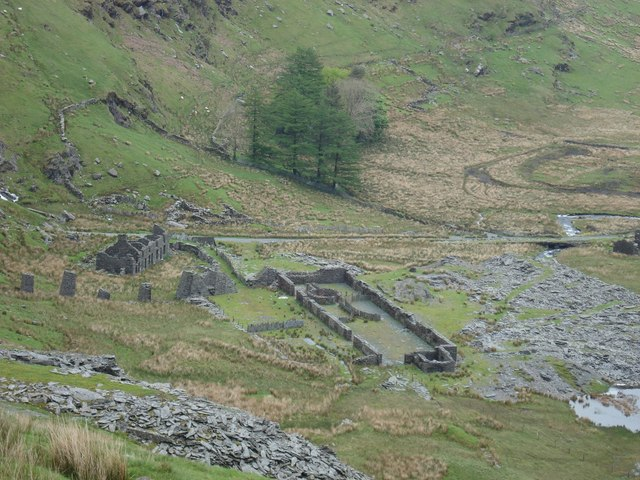
The remains of Conglog mill

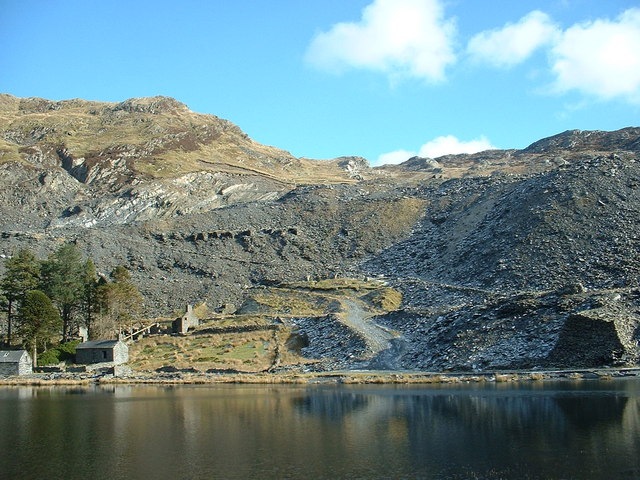
Cwmorthin Quarry seen from across the lake

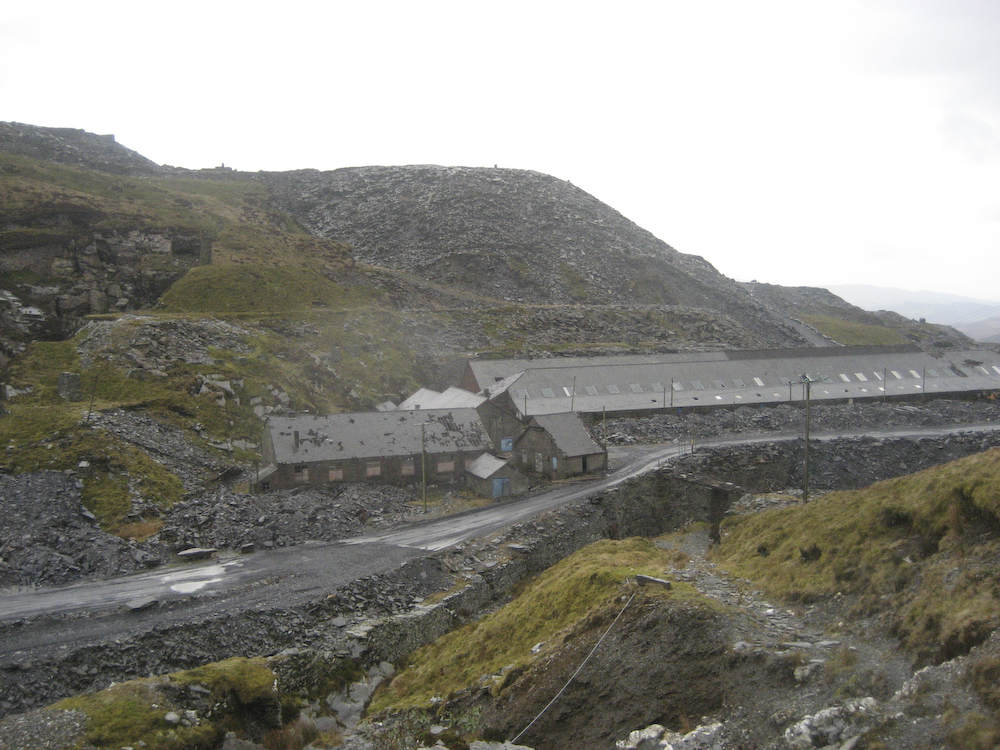
Maenofferen adit and mill

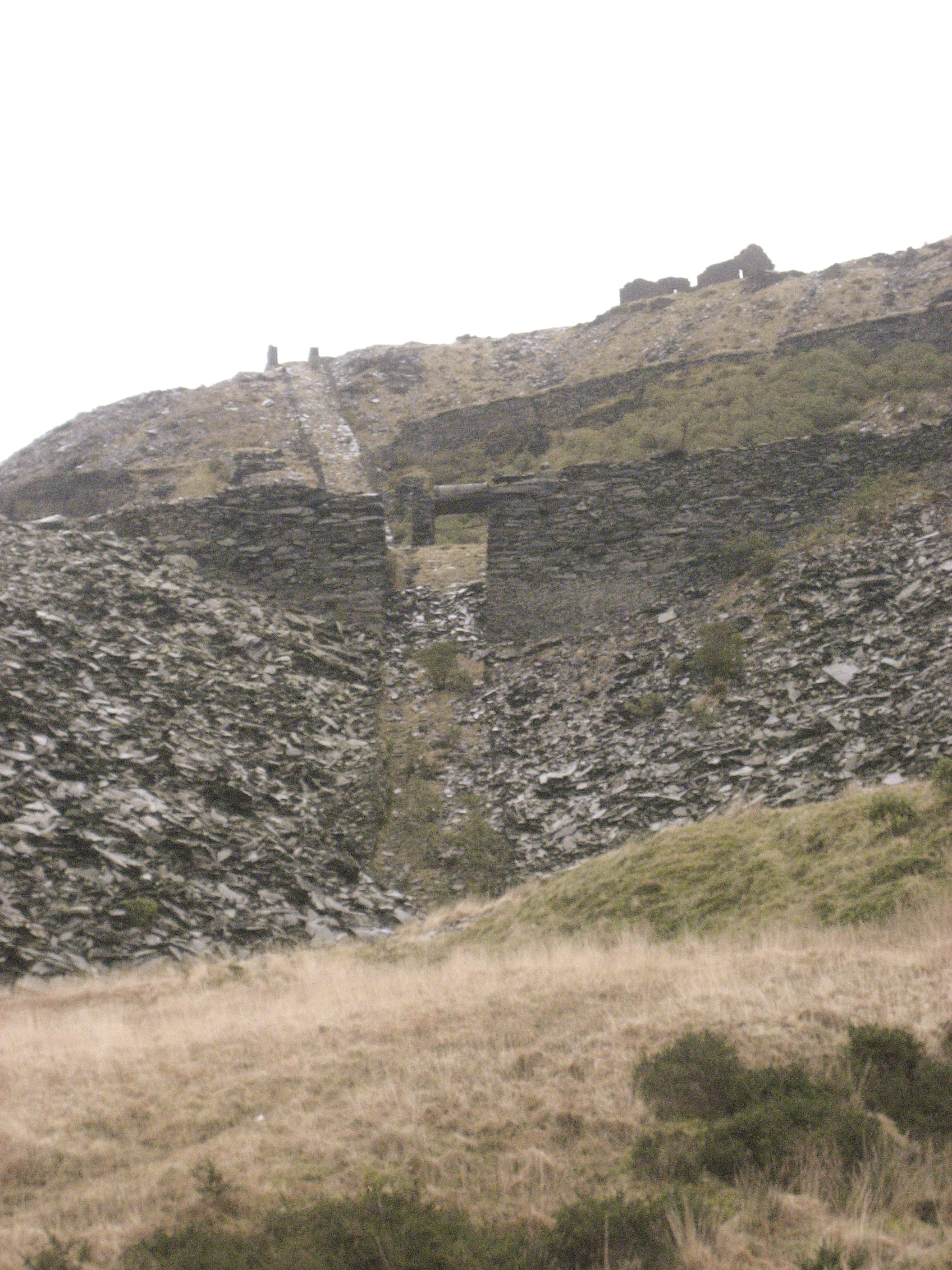
The inclines leading down from Diphwys Casson into Votty & Bowydd

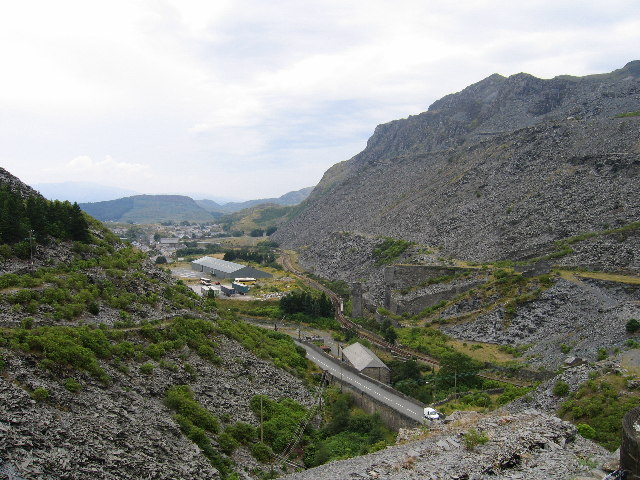
Llechwedd and Oakeley from the north. Llechwedd is on the left, the slate tips on the right are Oakeley

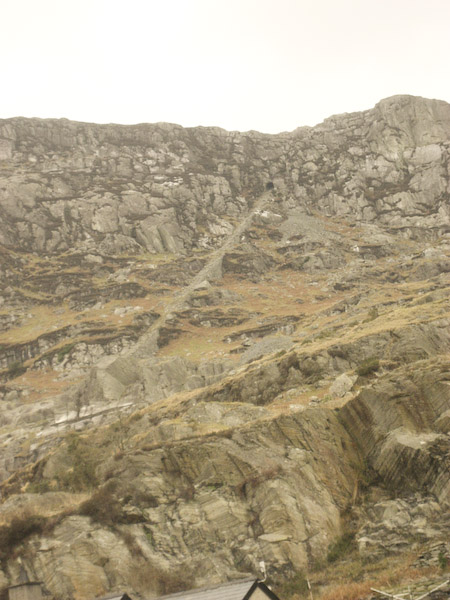
The incline connecting the Wrysgan quarry to the Festiniog Railway at Tanygrisiau

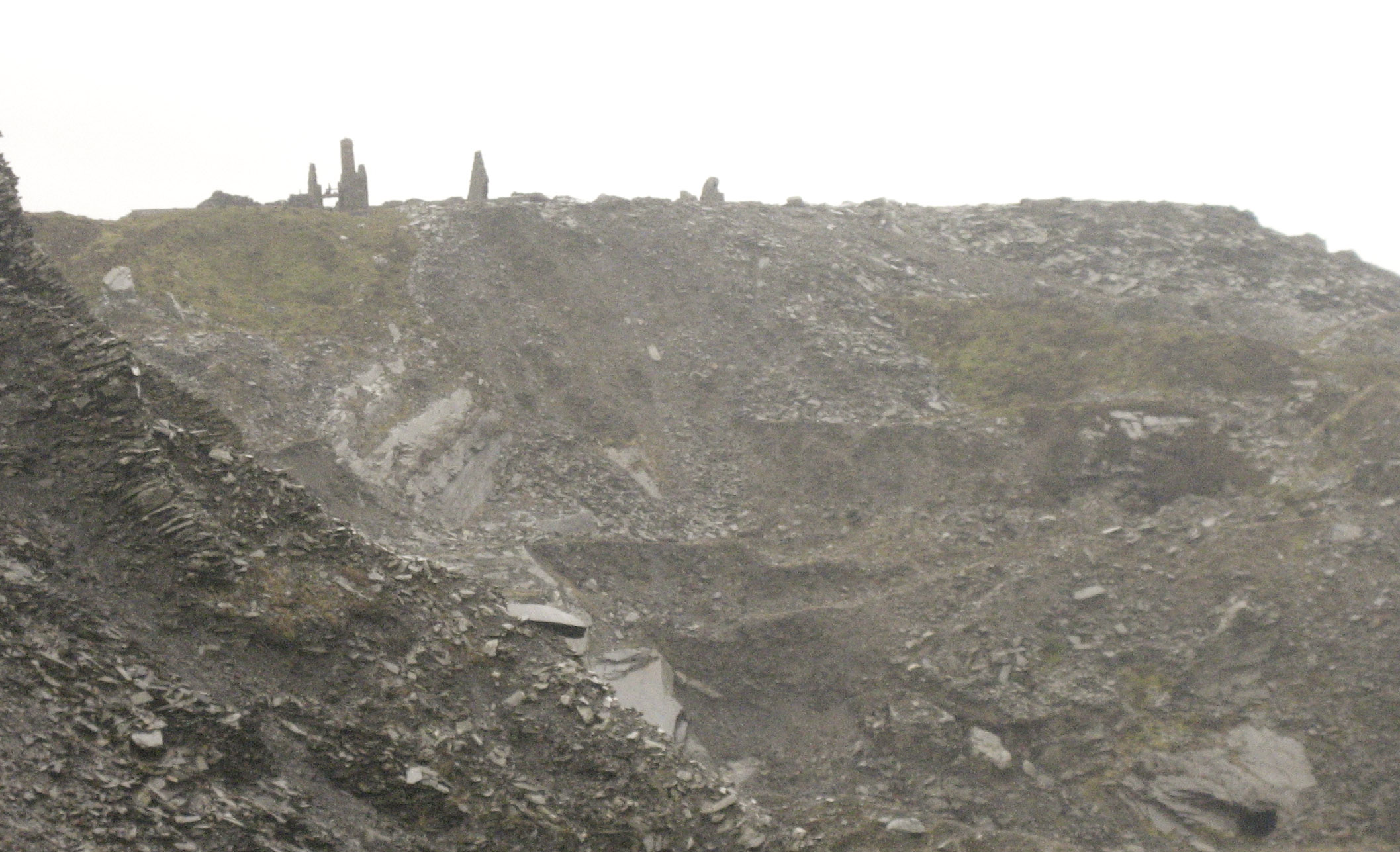
The remains of Diphwys Casson mill above the Votty & Bowydd pit

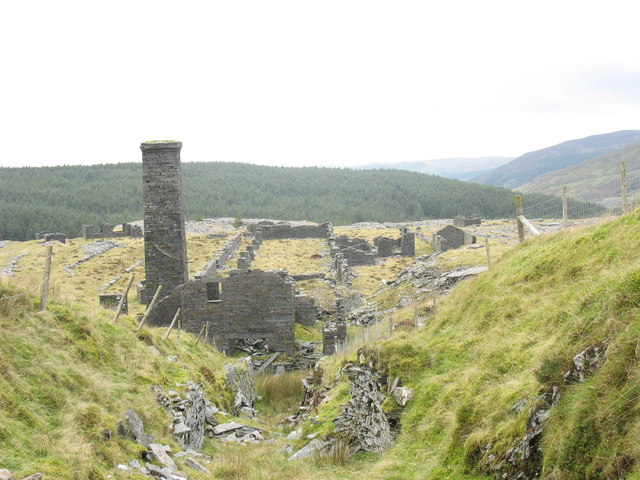
The Rhiwbach engine house

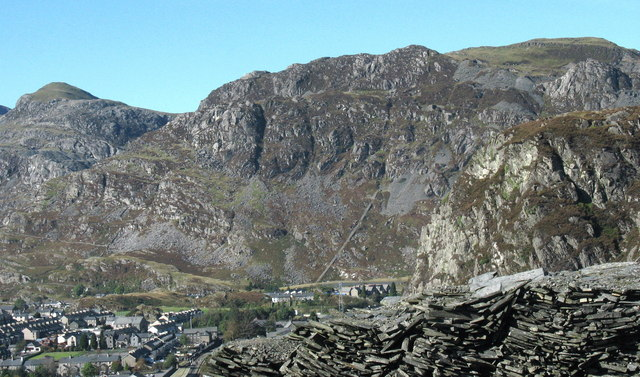
The cliffs of Nyth-y-Gigfran

== See also ==
- Conwy Valley Line
- British narrow gauge railways
- Slate industry in Wales
- Ffestiniog railway
