= Nyth-y-Gigfran quarry =

Disused slate quarry in Wales

Nyth-y-Gigfran
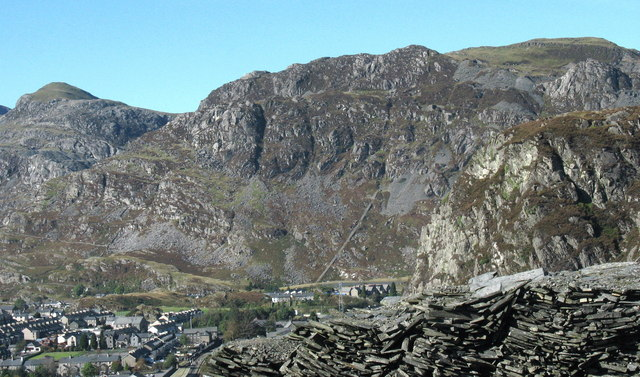
- The cliffs of Nyth-y-Gigfran with the quarry incline and waste tips visible

- Location in Gwynedd
- Location: Blaenau Ffestiniog, Gwynedd, Wales, UK; 52°59′47.87″N 3°57′12.53″W grid reference SH6891046186
- Products: Slate
- Type: Underground Quarry
- Opened: c.1840

Nyth-y-Gigfran quarry (sometimes spelt: Nith-y-Gigfran or Nidd-y-Gigfran; sometimes known as Glan-y-Pwll quarry) was a slate quarry in the town of Blaenau Ffestiniog, North Wales. It was located about 300 feet (91 m) above the settlement of Glan y Pwll, south of what was to become Blaenau Ffestiniog. The quarry was sited on the steep cliffs that form the eastern edge of Allt-fawr and was entirely underground. The quarry opened around 1840 and became part of the Oakeley quarry in the 1880s; this in turn closed in 1969.

== History ==
Nyth-y-Gigfran opened around 1840, operated by Thomas James. Working was stopped when the Tan-y-Bwlch estate claimed it was working on their land.

In 1861 the Glan-y-Pwll Slate & Slab Company Ltd. was incorporated to work the quarry. In 1867 the incline was constructed to connect to the Ffestiniog Railway. Two small open pits were developed on the south side of Allt-fawr, at the top of the cliffs, and adits led to several underground chambers, including a 500 yard trial adit to the west of the main pit. Oakeley claimed that the Glan-y-pwll underground workings were encroaching onto their land, and obtained an injunction to stop the company. The quarry closed in 1870, with the company going into liquidation two years later.

After this failure the owning company was acquired by the owners of the neighbouring Oakeley quarry which was mining the north slopes of Allt-fawr. In 1922, Nyth-y-Gigran was inspected by Thomas Jones of Oakeley who said there was "the prospect of a considerable quarry being opened out there". The Oakeley manager proposed driving a tunnel from their upper quarry to meet the Nyth-y-Gigfran chambers and thus work the rock from the east. The two quarries were connected underground by 1924, and the Nyth-y-gigfran chambers were producing slate for the first time in 50 years. Thus Nyth-y-Gigfran became part of the largest underground slate mine in the world, and was worked until Oakeley closed in 1969.

Between 1974 and 1997, the Gloddfa Ganol tourist attraction, based in Oakeley quarry, offered underground tours into the Nyth-y-Gigfran workings.

== Geology ==
Nyth-y-Gigfran worked the Glan y Pwll slate vein, which produced rock of a distinctive green colour - which led to it sometimes being called the Olive Vein.

== Transportation ==
In 1867, a long, single pitch incline was constructed to connect the quarry with the Ffestiniog Railway at Groesffordd. Slate from Nyth-y-Gigfran was shipped via the railway to the Maenofferen quarry's wharf at Porthmadog Harbour. The incline fell out of use when the quarry closed in the 1880s.

The incline was unusual because it did not connect to the adits of the quarry; it stopped about 100 feet (30 m) below that level because the mountain was too steep above this point. A steeper wooden sledway was used to lower slate down from the adit to the incline winding house. There, on a narrow platform built on the mountain slope, it was loaded onto slate waggons which were lowered to the Ffestiniog Railway.
