= Cwt y Bugail quarry =

Disused slate quarry in north Wales

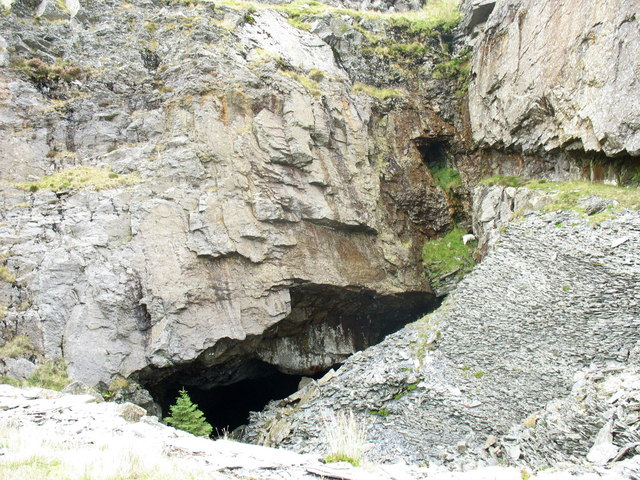
- The top of a chamber in the south pit (centre), with the adit linking the north and south pits (upper right)

- Location in Gwynedd

Location
- Location: near Blaenau Ffestiniog, Gwynedd, Wales, UK; 53.0033°N 3.88903°W grid reference SH7325446812

Production
- Products: Slate
- Type: Quarry

History
- Opened: 1863
- Closed: 1961

Owner
- Company: Welsh Slate Ltd.
- Website: www.welshslate.com

The Cwt y Bugail quarry is a former slate quarry located east of Blaenau Ffestiniog in Wales. It was first worked as a trial pit around 1840. Continuous production began in 1863 and continued until closure in 1961. The quarry was connected to the Ffestiniog Railway at Duffws Station via the Rhiwbach Tramway.

== History ==
Cwt y Bugail means "Shepherd's Hut", and was probably the only notable feature in the vicinity, and hence was used for the name of the quarry.

Adam Gregory leased the Blaen y Cwm quarry above Blaenau Ffestiniog from 1838 to 1849. During this time he made several trial workings at Cwt y Bugail. In 1863 Hugh Beaver Roberts sold half his interest in the Cwt y Bugail land to a consortium who formed the New Cwt y Bugail Slate Company Ltd. to begin production on the site. This company worked the quarry until 1875 when the quarry was sold to the Bugail Slate Quarry Company Ltd. under the chairmanship of Thomas Scott of Edinburgh; during this period the quarry was known locally as 'y cwmni Ysgottiad' ("the Scottish Enterprise").

Around 1877 the quarry was taken over by Owen Williams from the nearby village of Penmachno. He ran Cwt y Bugail for the next thirty years and was the great-grandfather of Owen Glyn Williams who managed the quarry in the 1980s.

Production of slate peaked in 1877 and began dwindling significantly from 1884 onwards. By 1887 the quarry was closed, but Owen Williams formed a worker's cooperative and began working the quarry in 1888. The cooperative purchased the quarry from the Bugail Slate Quarry Co. for a nominal fee in 1892 Modest production with 60 men employed continued until 1898 when another gradual decline set in. In 1908 a rock fall in the quarry caused the company to fall into debt and it went into receivership in 1899. The receiver sold the quarry to Cadwalader Owen Roberts of Betws-y-Coed for a nominal sum.

The quarry continued operating under the name the New Welsh Slate Quarry. Cadwalader Pierce took over as manager in 1911 repairing some of the damage from the rock fall. The quarry continued producing until 1912 but after that only already worked slate was dispatched and the quarry closed again in April 1914. Roberts reopened Cwt y Bugail in 1919 after the end of the First World War and worked it for three more years, but again the enterprise failed and the quarry closed.

In 1923 Tudor Roberts of Glanypwll set up the Cwt y Bugail Slate Quarries Ltd. to purchase and work the quarry. This company owned the quarry until 1961, though from 1946 it was sub-leased to the nearby Maenofferen quarry to which it was connected by the Rhiwbach Tramway. From 1956 onwards the quarry was sub-leased to Manod Slate Quarries Ltd. which operated the Graig Ddu quarry to the south.

In 1961 the Cwt y Bugail company was taken over by a consortium led by Dafydd Price, who also purchased Graig Ddu which at this time was a much more productive quarry. Some sporadic slate extraction continued at Cwt y Bugail until 1972.

A subsidiary of Ffestiniog Slate Quarry Ltd. purchased the land and mineral rights to Cwt y Bugail in 1985. Ffestiniog Slate Quarries also owned the Oakeley quarry in Blaenau Ffestiniog and in 1997 was taken over by the McAlpines group. McAlpine's slate interests were subsequently taken over by Welsh Slate Ltd., the owners of the Penrhyn quarry. The nearby Manod quarry has been renamed 'Cwt-y-Bugail' since Cwt y Bugail quarry's closure.

== Transport ==
=== Connection to the Rhiwbach Tramway ===
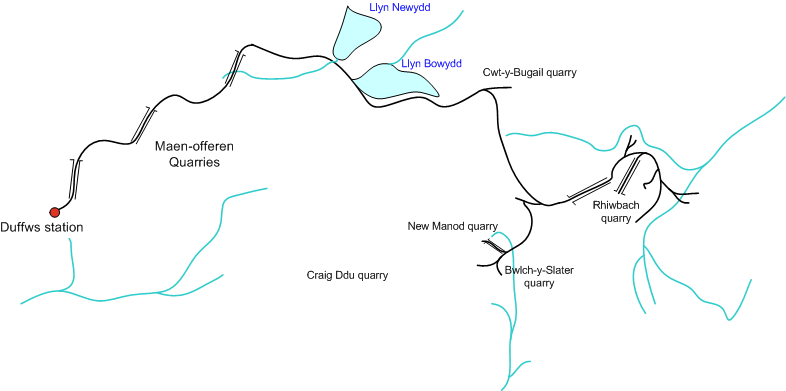
Map of the Rhiwbach Tramway showing the location of Cwt y Bugail

Despite its remote location, Cwt y Bugail was able to transport its production via the Rhiwbach Tramway which fed the Ffestiniog Railway at Blaenau Ffestiniog. The tramway was built by the Festiniog Slate Quarry Co. Ltd. in 1863 to connect its Rhiwbach quarry with the Ffestiniog Railway. As part of the agreement that allowed the construction of the tramway over private land, Cwt y Bugail was allowed to use the tramway for its slate output.

The tramway continued to be the primary transport link for the quarry for nearly a hundred years. When the Rhiwbach quarry closed in 1953, Cwt y Bugail became the sole remaining user of the upper portion of the tramway, continuing until the quarry closure of 1961.

=== Internal tramways ===
Internally the quarry connected to the tramway via a cable hauled incline that lifted the loaded slate wagons approximately 10 feet (3 m) from the quarry's mill level to the junction with the tramway. This was operational by 1888, and initially got its power from the portable steam engine which powered the mill. Later it was powered by an air winch, supplied with compressed air by an Ingersoll Rand single cylinder compressor. After 1912, when the quarry was not operating, but slates were still being exported from the stackyard, the haulier on the Rhiwbach Tramway was paid 3 pence per waggon to haul them up to the tramway with his horse. From the 1930s, waggons were removed by the Tramway locomotive. This was limited to two waggons at a time, as the gradient from the stackyard to the tramway was roughly 1 in 50.

Within the quarry were eleven or twelve inclines used at various periods to access the slate workings and tipping areas. These were connected to the mill via lightly laid tramways using bridge and flat bottom rail. Although the majority of this track was laid to 1 ft 11 1/2 in (597 mm) narrow gauge to match the Rhiwbach Tramway, there is some evidence that the earliest tramways in the quarry were laid to 2 ft 2 in (660 mm) gauge.

==== Locomotives ====
For most of the quarry's existence, the internal tramways were worked by hand or horse power. From the late 1940s a series of internal combustion locomotives are known to have worked in the quarry:

Builder	Type	Works Number	Built	Notes
Ruston and Hornsby	4wDM 20HP	223687	1944	Purchased before 1949 from the Ministry of Supply, used on the Rhiwbach Tramway from 1953 to 1961, scrapped between 1974 and 1977
Hibberd	4wDM 10HP		c. 1925	Scrapped in 1960
Lister	4wDM 6HP	3742	1931	Purchased from Groesyddwyafon Quarry before 1953. Scrapped, gearbox reused in a winch
Hunslet	4wDM 20HP	2024	1940	Purchased from the Trefor granite quarry between 1962 and 1964, but too large for the adit and not used at Cwt y Bugail. Purchased by Gloddfa Ganol. Now at the Bala Lake Railway

== Geology ==
Of the five main slate veins that can be found at Blaenau Ffestiniog, only two stretch as far eastwards as the Cwt y Bugail quarry. These are the veins known, in Blaenau, as the Back Vein, and the North Vein; in this quarry they were called the Front Vein (or Red Vein, or Small Vein), and the Back Vein, respectively. This was because of positioning of the workings which worked on it. The slate beds dip to the north at an angle of about 35 degrees. The back vein is around 90 feet (27 m) thick at the surface, and increases in thickness to around 180 feet (55 m) at the level of floor D. To the south of it is a layer of hard rock called "whinstone", and another layer of hard rock, some 72 feet (22 m) separates it from the North Vein, which continues past the northern edge of the quarry. The Dolwyddelan fault crosses the site from north to south immediately to the east of the main adits, and the veins end abruptly at its location.

== Description ==
There were two main areas where the slate was extracted. One was called the Front Quarry, which was worked on the Front Vein and southwards; the other was called the Back Quarry, and worked the Back vein, further to the north. Both veins were worked initially as open quarries, but were then worked in chambers underground.

All of the mine's chambers were west of the adits, because of the Dolwyddelan fault. The slate was of poor quality close to the fault (it was generally shattered), but improved westwards. Floors in the quarry were lettered from A to E, working downwards, with the main mill at level B. Floors were created at vertical intervals of 30 feet (9.1 m).

=== Bibliography ===
- Boyd, J.I.C. (1975). The Festiniog Railway. Vol. 2. Oakwood Press. ISBN 085361-168-8.
- Lewis, M.J.T. (2003). Blaen y Cwm and Cwt y Bugail Slate Quarries. Adit Publications. ISBN 978-0-9522979-3-2.
