= Blaen y Cwm quarry =

Disused slate quarry in north Wales

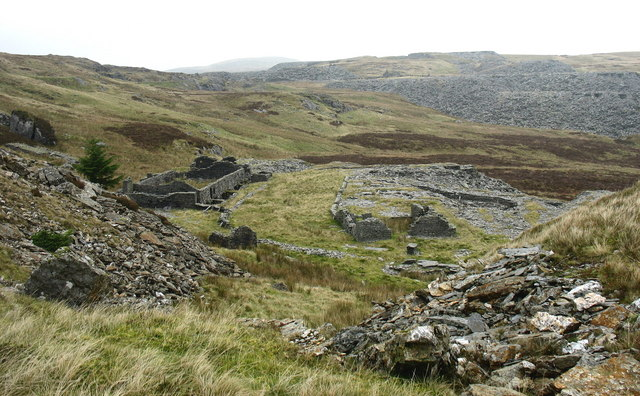
- The ruined mill at Blaen y Cwm in 2005

- Location in Gwynedd

Location
- Location: near Blaenau Ffestiniog, Conwy County Borough, Wales, UK; 52.9988°N 3.8884°W grid reference SH7328346310

Production
- Products: Slate
- Type: Quarry

History
- Opened: c.1813
- Closed: 1914

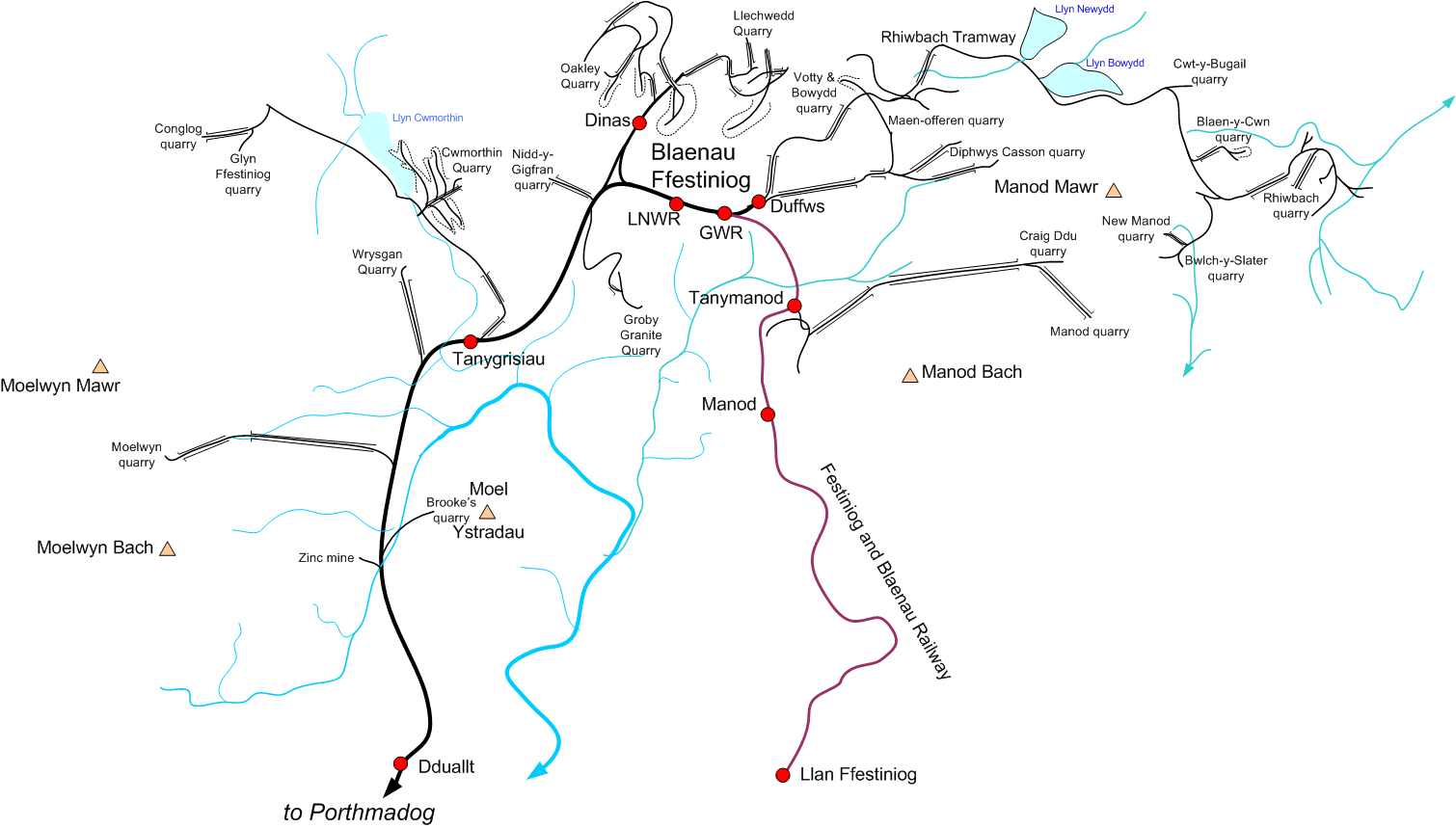
Map showing the quarry feeder lines of the Ffestiniog Railway, with the Rhiwbach Tramway and Blaen y Cwm at upper right

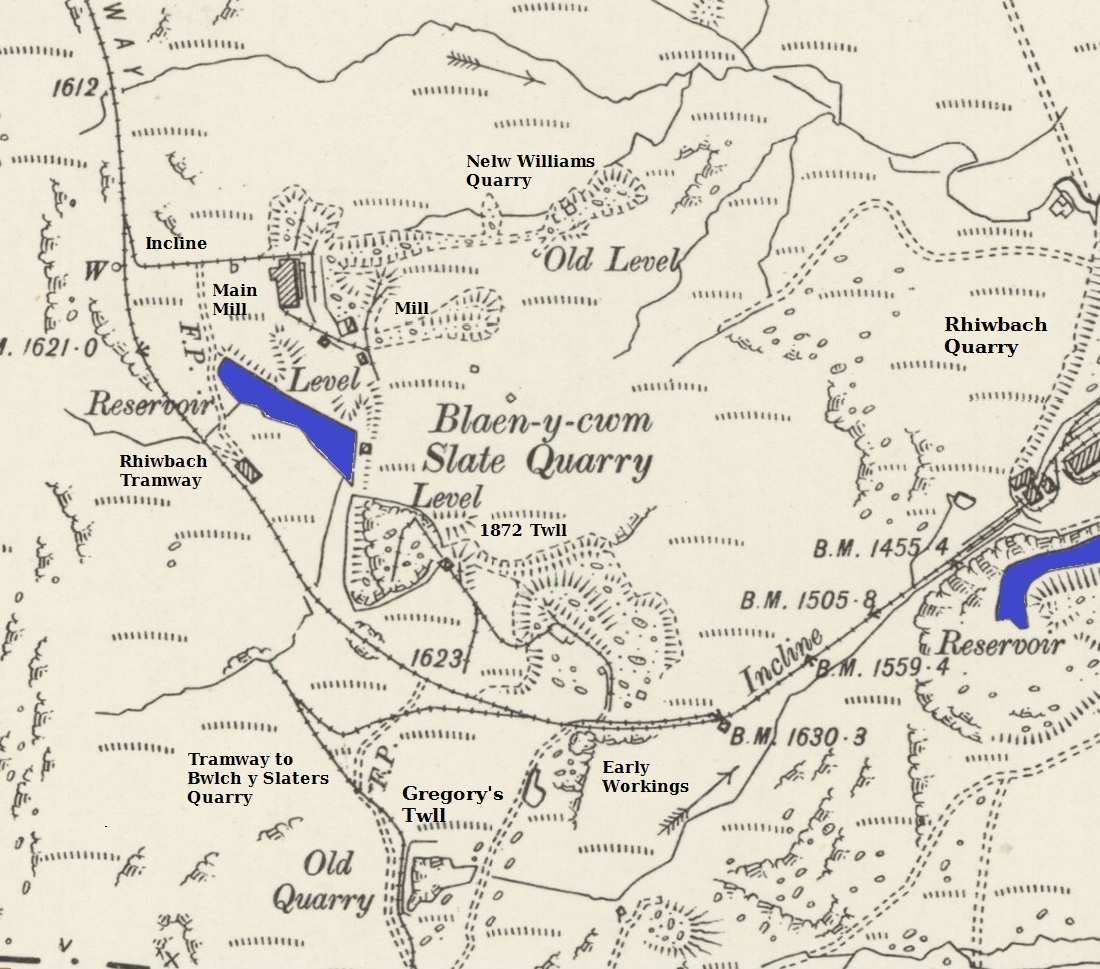
Map of Blaen y Cwm slate quarry around 1899

The Blaen y Cwm quarry was a slate quarry located east of Blaenau Ffestiniog in Wales. It was first worked in some time between 1813 and 1818 and sporadically after that until 1914. The quarry was connected to the Ffestiniog Railway at Duffws Station via the Rhiwbach Tramway.

== History ==
Blaen y Cwm and the nearby Cwt y Bugail quarry are both situated on Blaen y Cwm farm, an area of around 500 acres (200 ha) in Penmachno which was owned until the 1860s by the Wynne family of Peniarth. The Wynne family attempted to sell the farm in 1813 by auction, and the sale document mentioned that veins of slate ran through the property. The farm did not sell, but quarrying probably began shortly afterwards and the first indication of quarrying activity on the Blaen y Cwm site is a map from 1818 that shows a modest quarry there. These early workings continued for some years on a small scale, for the farm was again offered for auction in 1826, when it was noted that a 'valuable slate quarry has been opened', but again a sale did not occur. Thomas Roberts, who lived at Betws-y-Coed but later moved to Penmachno, was the first person known to have worked the quarry, creating one of the upper levels, which was probably the quarry site later known as Gregory's Twll, close to the route of the tramway branch which later served Bwlch y Slaters quarry.

After a period when there is no evidence that any activity took place, with part of the quarry being abandoned in 1834, the quarry was leased for 21 years to Captain Adam Gregory in 1838. Gregory originally came from Tal-y-cafn, but by 1838 was living in Worksop, north Nottinghamshire, and he also held the lease for Cwt y Bugail as well as a number of other Welsh mines and quarries. Despite spending considerable sums of money on developing the site, Gregory's operations were not a financial success and in 1849 he surrendered the lease to Blaen y Cwm, after he fell behind with the rent payments.

In 1853, brothers Thomas and James Swinton Spooner, both sons of the Ffestiniog Railway's engineer James Spooner, leased the mineral rights of Blaen y Cwm for two years. The renewed the lease in 1855 but surrendered it in 1857. The Spooner family planned to extend the Ffestiniog Railway to the nearby Rhiwfachnoquarry, with branches to serve the local cluster of quarries at Blaen y Cwm, Cwt y Bugail and Rhiwbach. Despite a bill being put before Parliament in 1854, the scheme was dropped. The quarry does not appear to have been worked at all during this period.

In 1861 a new takenote for Blaen y Cwm was granted by Wynne to Hugh Beaver Roberts of Bangor. Roberts was a solicitor, although he was also involved in many slate quarrying enterprises throughout the region, including the construction and ownership of the Croesor Tramway serving quarries to the west of Blaenau Ffestiniog, and was chairman of the George Hotel Company in Bangor. The takenote allowed him to extract minerals for three years. Roberts then sold half of the rights to an engineer from Bangor called Joseph Haywood, another engineer from London called Robert Lecky, and a London-based sharebroker called John Taylor. For the half share, he received £2,500 together with shares in a company proposed to run Cwt y Bugail quarry nominally worth another £2,500. In 1866, Wynne granted two leases to Roberts and his associates, backdated to when the takenote ran out in 1864, and lasting for 42 years. One covered the northern half of the area, on which the Cwt y Bugail quarry developed, and the other covered Ffridd Nant, some 260 acres (110 ha) on which the existing and future development of Blaen y Cwm quarry took place. In a series of dubious transactions, the Ffidd Nant lease was sold on for £3,000 within a month, to Edwin Dixon and Richard Morris Griffith, a slate merchant and bank manager, both of whom resided in Bangor. After failing to sell the lease for £15,000 almost immediately, and for £7,000 a year later, Dixon and Griffith finally sold it for £6,000 to William Henry Gatty of Market Harborough in 1869. Gatty had married a rich lady, and it was her money that financed the venture.

He began to work the quarry under the title the Blaenycwm Slate Company, employing a mining engineer from Penrhyn quarry as his manager, who was replaced by a slate inspector from the same quarry shortly afterwards. The new manager was William Griffiths, and he developed a third site during the four years that he was employed there. No legal documents have been found for the period after 1869, and so the history becomes a little sketchy. The Rhiwbach Tramway had been built by the Ffestiniog Railway in 1861, funded by the owners of the Rhiwbach quarry, and passed around the western and southern edges of Blaen y Cwm. However, access to the tramway was not straight forward, as the workings were located some 100 feet (30 m) below the level of the tracks. An incline from the main mill site up to the tramway was constructed some time after 1871 and before 1876, as the Ffestiniog Railway has traffic receipts from 1876. The incline was 285 feet (87 m) long, rising at a gradient of 22 degrees, raising the wagons by 107 feet (33 m). The top half followed the ground surface, but lower down, stone was used to construct the embankment on which it ran. Whereas many quarries used gravity inclines, Blaen y Cwm required a powered incline, as the loaded wagons passed uphill. A haulage engine was installed at the bottom of the slope, which was an unusual arrangement, although it was also employed at the nearby Rhiwbach incline, which was considerably larger.

Production continued on a relatively small scale through the 1870s, with Griffiths still the manager until at least 1876, but Gatty was joined by Edwin Dixon, who had sold the lease to Gatty, and another man called Wright in a partnership. The quarry was briefly known as Pen-y-ffridd, although trade directories from 1879 and 1883 mentioned the Blaen y Cwm Slate Quarry Co. The quarry was abandoned by 1888, after many of the assets had been removed. In 1889 the quarry was surveyed by E.P. Jones the manager of Diffwys quarry, with a view to selling it, and William Lewis of Tan-y-Grisiau Foundry subsequently bought it. He carried out some work in 1889 and 1890, but the quarry was idle again from 1891 to 1897.

Another attempt to work Blaen y Cwm started in 1898 under the ownership of George Watson, who lived at Llanrwst, but soon afterwards moved to Plas Meini, Ffestiniog. He employed 16 men in that year, and in 1899 formed the new Blaenycwm Slate Quarry Co. Ltd., the first limited company to own the quarry. 487 tons of slates were shipped in 1900 and 398 tons in 1901, but any success was short lived, as the company was voluntarily wound up in 1903. The final attempt to make a success of the quarry began in 1904 with a new company, the Blaen-y-Cwm Slate Quarry Co. This worked on a limited scale until 1906, followed by a hiatus until revived in 1910. The quarry finally closed on 8 May 1914, when the last load of slate was sent out. Apart from some surface extraction of "rustic slates" by a local man called George Budski in the 1960s, Blaen y Cwm did not operate again.

== Transport ==
Until the early 1820s the output of Blaen y Cwm was, like that of Rhiwbach quarry, taken northwards down Cwm Machno and the Conwy Valley, to be loaded onto boats at Trefriw, sometimes into sea-going ships, and at others into river craft, to be taken to Conwy where it was transhipped. It was some 14 miles (23 km) from Rhiwbach to the quay at Trefriw, with another 10 miles (16 km) down the river to Conwy, and the Blaen y Cwm slates followed a track north-eastwards and then south-eastwards from the quarry to just below Rhiwbach. The slates may have been transported by packhorse, although the roads were wide enough for carts to have been used.

In about 1820, changes to the local road system led to the route following the Roman Sarn Helen falling into disrepair, and the route following Cwm Teigl via Bwlch Carreg y Fran being re-established. A new road heading south from Blaen y Cwm replaced the former northern route. Shortly afterwards, William Madocks decided to move his harbour eastwards from the unsuitable Ynys Cyngar to a new site to be known as Portmadoc, now Porthmadog, at the western end of his Traeth Mawr embankment enclosing the estuary of the Afon Glaslyn. From about 1825, the southern route over the mountain to Ffestiniog and on to Porthmadog became more attractive, although it involved an ascent of about 50 feet (15 m) from the quarry site before heading downhill to a quay of the Afon Dwyryd, from where river craft took the produce to Porthmadog. It was around 7 miles (11 km) by road from the quarry to the quay on the Dwyryd below Maentwrog. When a fresh attempt to extract slate from the old workings to the east of Gregory's Twll was made, a well-engineered road was constructed from there to the Bwlch in 1825, blasted into the rocks on one side, and supported by a retaining wall on the other.

From 1869 the quarry used the Rhiwbach Tramway to connect with the Ffestiniog Railway at Blaenau Ffestiniog. Initially the slate was carried by hand or wheelbarrow uphill to the tramway. An incline was constructed between 1872 and 1876 that allowed a less manually intensive direct connection between the internal quarry tramways and the Rhiwbach Tramway above. The incline was unusual in that the haulage engine was located at the bottom. A second incline, in line with the first, continued eastwards falling around 88 feet (27 m) at an angle of 10 degrees, to serve the Nelw Williams quarry. It was some 508 feet (155 m) long, and was probably built in the 1880s. Because none of the Ordnance Survey maps of the period show it with track in position, it is not clear when it was in use, nor how it was powered.

The internal quarry tramways were laid in very light rail suitable for hand working of single wagons. They were laid to a nominal 1 ft 11 1/2 in (597 mm) narrow gauge throughout, matching the gauge of the Rhiwbach Tramway. There is no evidence that locomotives were ever used within the quarry. One curiosity is that some Thomas Hughes rail sleepers have been found on the site. The system was invented by Hughes around 1845, and consisted of circular bars with elbows at both ends, which fitted into holes in the cast iron sleepers. Hughes worked at Penrhyn quarry, and these are the only known use of this system in the Ffestiniog region.

== Geology ==
Blaen y Cwm quarry is located on a vein of slate which is known as the Back Vein in Blaenau Ffestiniog and at Cwt y Bugail quarry. At both places, the vein could be worked reasonably profitably, because the slate was of good quality, but at Blaen y Cwm, the vein is very close to the igneous instrusion that forms the mountain Manod Mawr. The workings at Blaen y Cwm covered a large area, as the search for good rock continued, but there were only a few thin veins where the slate was good enough to produce finished slates, and most of the rock found was cracked, distorted and discoloured, with large and small faults, making it only suitable for the rubbish tips.

== Bibliography ==
- Boyd, J I C (1972). Narrow Gauge Railways in South Caernarvonshire. Oakwood Press. ISBN 978-0-85361-115-8. OCLC 636874685.
- Boyd, J I C (1975a). The Festiniog Railway; Vol. 1 - History and Route. Oakwood Press. ISBN 978-0-85361-167-7. OCLC 2074549.
- Boyd, J I C (1975b). The Festiniog Railway 1800 - 1974; Vol. 2 - Locomotives and Rolling Stock; Quarries and Branches: Rebirth 1954-74. Oakwood Press. ISBN 978-0-85361-168-4. OCLC 874117875.
- Lewis, M J T (2003). Blaen y Cwm and Cwt y Bugail Slate Quarries. Adit Publications. ISBN 978-0-9522979-3-2.
- Lindsay, Jean (1974). A History of the North Wales Slate Industry. David and Charles. ISBN 978-0-7153-6265-5.
- Richards, Alun John (1991). A Gazeteer of the Welsh Slate Industry. Gwasg Carreg Gwalch. ISBN 978-0-86381-196-8.
- Richards, Alun John (1999). The Slate Regions of North and Mid Wales. Gwasg Carreg Gwalch. ISBN 978-0-86381-552-2.
