= Rhiwbach Tramway =

Railway in north Wales (1861–1961)

Coordinates: 53.0022°N 3.9035°W

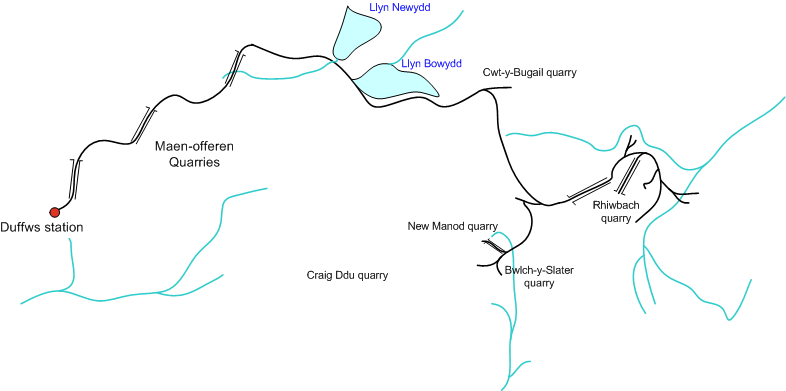
- The route of the Rhiwbach Tramway

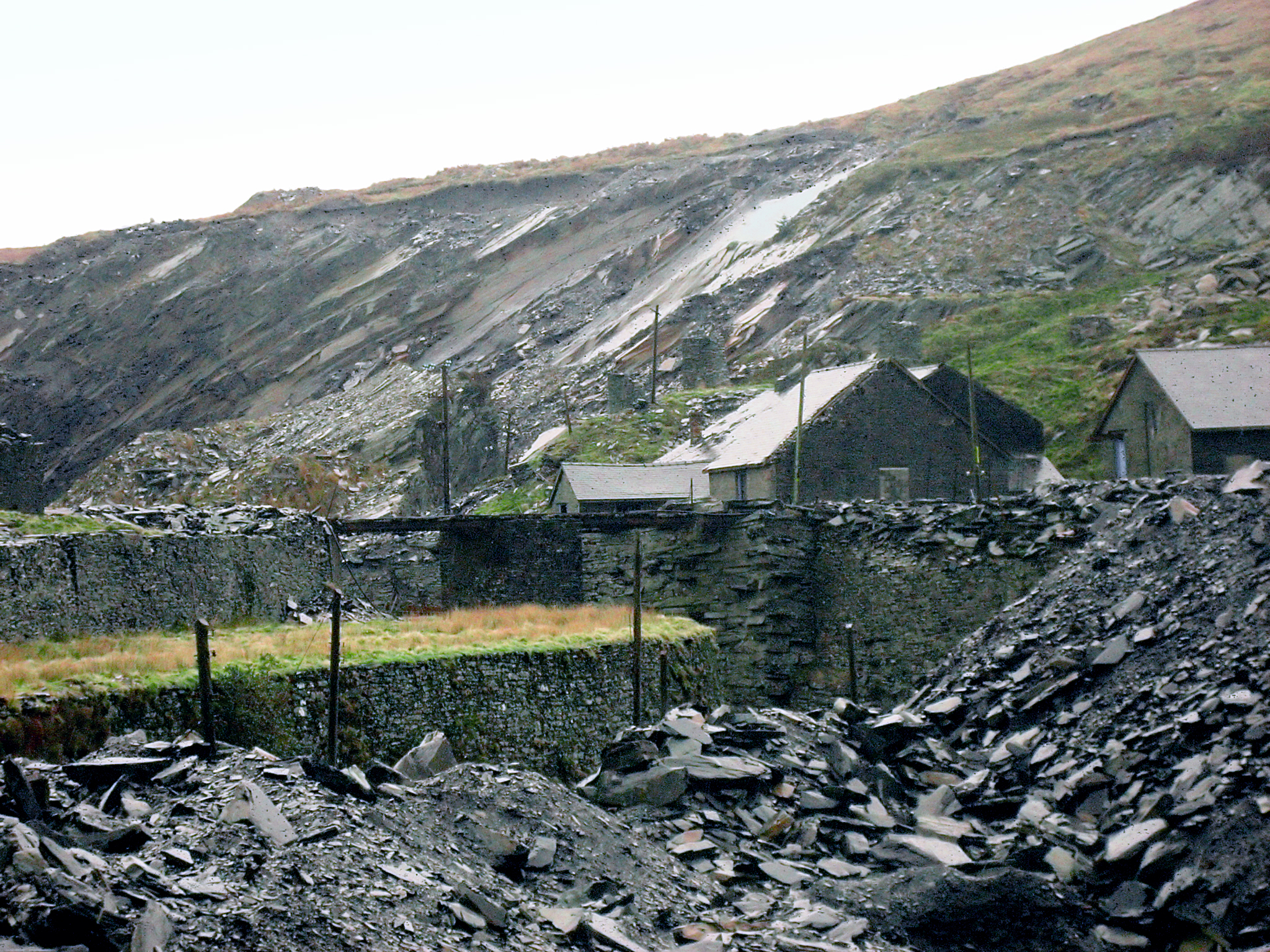
- The Rhiwbach Tramway passing to the left and below the main Maen Offeren mill level

Overview
- Headquarters: Blaenau Ffestiniog
- Locale: Wales
- Dates of operation: 1861–1961
- Successor: Abandoned

Technical
- Track gauge: 1 ft 11 1/2 in (597 mm)
- Length: 3 miles (4.8 km)

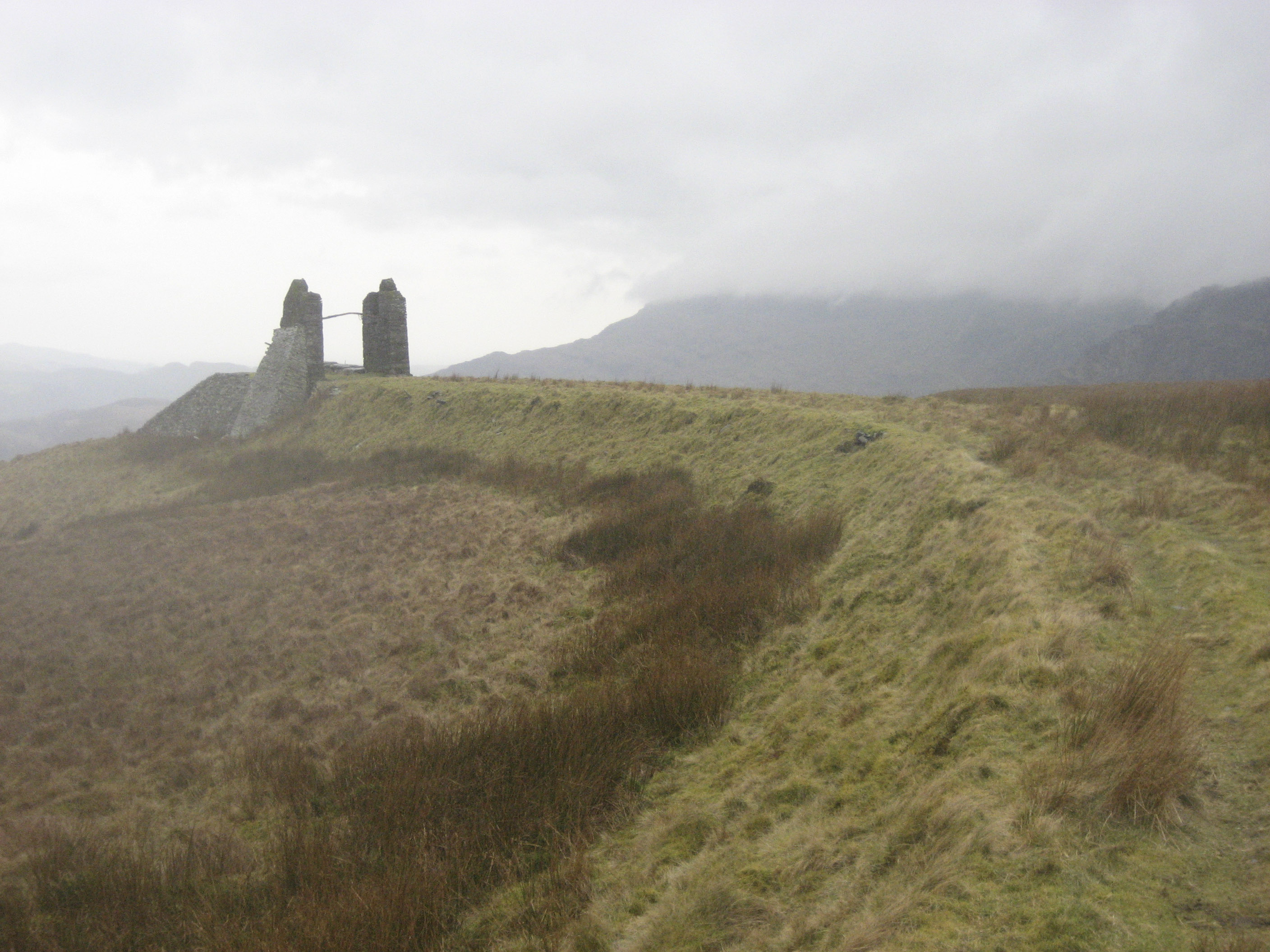
The head of the No. 3 incline of the Rhiwbach Tramway in 2007

The Rhiwbach Tramway was a Welsh industrial, 1 ft 11 1/2 in (597 mm) narrow gauge railway connecting the remote slate quarries east of Blaenau Ffestiniog with the Ffestiniog Railway. It was in use by 1862, and remained so until progressively closed between 1956 and 1976. The route included three inclines, one of which became the last operational gravity incline in the North Wales slate industry. The tramway was worked by horses and gravity for much of its existence, but a diesel locomotive was used to haul wagons on the top section between 1953 and its closure in 1961.

== History ==
The first attempts to build a tramway to connect to quarries east of Blaenau Ffestiniog were made in 1854, when a petition to build the Ffestiniog and Machno Railway was presented to Parliament. This would 'authorise the construction of a new line of railway from Duffws to the Machno Slate Quarries and other purposes'. The intent was that this would be quite separate from the Ffestiniog Railway. The bill was promoted by Thomas Spooner, but was abandoned at the committee stage. One factor may have been the Ffestiniog Railway's insistence that all products produced by the quarries served should be exported via the railway, and this caused disagreement among the quarry owners. A second scheme was promoted in the late 1850s, to connect to the Rhiwbach Quarry, missing out the Penmachno Quarry. It was this scheme that was subsequently built.

The Ffestiniog Railway built an extension beyond Duffws in 1860, to connect to the end of the tramway. Between 1861 and 1863, they contracted the construction of the Rhiwbach Tramway to Owen Gethin Jones of Penmachno, although it was financed by the Festiniog Slate Company Ltd, owners of the Rhiwbach Quarry. It was in use by two quarries in early 1862, but was not finally finished until early 1863. Quarries which used the tramway paid tolls to the Festiniog Slate Company.

The tramway remained in operation over its full length for close to a century. The section between Cwt y Bugail and Rhiwbach was lifted in 1956 and the section from Cwt y Bugail to Maenofferen was closed in 1961 and lifted in 1964. The first incline was replaced by a road, but a short section remained in use between the mills at Maenofferen and the foot of No 2 Incline, which became the last remaining gravity incline in the North Wales slate industry. This section was finally closed in 1976 after a new quarry road was built connecting the upper levels of Llechwedd with the mills at Maenofferen. Most of the track was lifted, although short sections of track remained intact as late as 2013.

== Route ==
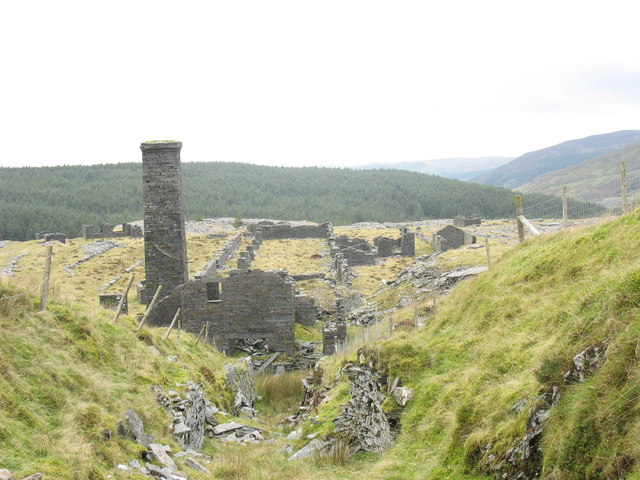
The bottom of the incline down from the end of the tramway into Rhiwbach quarry

The quarries connected to the tramway had no practical road access as they lay at a high altitude in a remote moorland. Rhiwbach Quarry was about 1,560 ft (475 m) above sea level, while the main tramway was higher still, at around 1,625 ft (495 m). The tramway rose by three inclines through Maen Offeren quarry to reach the plateau. The first incline, Rhiwbach No. 1, which was sometimes known as Bowydd incline or Dolgarregddu incline, climbed from a junction at the east end of the Ffestiniog Railway's Duffws station approximately 300 feet (91 m) along the base of Garreg Ddu mountain. The line then skirted the western edge of Votty & Bowydd Quarry. Rhiwbach No. 2 incline then rose a further 350 feet (110 m) to reach the level of the Maenofferen quarry mills. The tramway ran a quarter of a mile south to pass the Maenofferen mills and the foot of the last incline. Rhiwbach No. 3 incline climbed a further 300 feet (91 m) to reach the plateau above Blaenau Ffestiniog, passing the main pit of the David and Jones Quarry.

From the head of No. 3 incline, the tramway ran on an approximately level course east towards Cwt y Bugail Quarry. It skirted the edge of Llyn Bowydd, a reservoir constructed to supply water to power the equipment in the quarries below. From Cwt y Bugail, the line turned south, passing Blaen y Cwm Quarry to the head of the incline down to the Rhiwbach quarry which lay below the plateau in the Machno valley. A further branch ran south from Blaen y Cwm, via a switchback, to Manod and Bwlch y Slaters quarries.

== Operations ==
The tramway was originally designed to be worked by horses and gravity. During busy periods, two or three horses were required to work the summit section between the top of No. 3 incline and the Rhiwbach incline. Sometime in the 1920s petrol locomotives were introduced to work this section and a small shed was built in which the locomotive was kept. The practice was not entirely successful, as the locomotive was too heavy for the track materials used, and parts of the tramway were relaid in light section flat-bottomed rail or heavier section bridge rail. In 1953 the Rhiwbach Quarry closed, leaving the Cwt y Bugail Quarry as the only user of the main section of the tramway.

== Locomotives ==
This table shows locomotives known to have worked the Rhiwbach Tramway.

Builder	Type	Works Number	Built	Notes
Ruston and Hornsby	4wDM	223687	1944	Purchased before 1949 by the Cwt y Bugail Quarry, used on the Rhiwbach Tramway from 1953 to 1961, scrapped at Cwt y Bugail 1974-1977
Motor Rail	4wPM	1904		Operating on the tramway in 1951.

== See also ==
- British industrial narrow gauge railways
- Industrial railway

=== Bibliography ===
- Boyd, James I.C. (1975a). The Festiniog Railway. Vol. 1. Oakwood Press.
- Boyd, James I.C. (1975b). The Festiniog Railway. Vol. 2. Oakwood Press. ISBN 085361-168-8.
- Lewis, M.J.T. (2003). Blaen y Cwm and Cwt y Bugail Slate Quarries. Adit Publications. ISBN 978-0-9522979-3-2.
- Richards, Alun John (2006). Slate Quarrying in Wales. Gwasg Carreg Gwalch. ISBN 978-1-84527-026-1.
