= Llechwedd quarry =

Disused slate mine in North Wales

Llechwedd
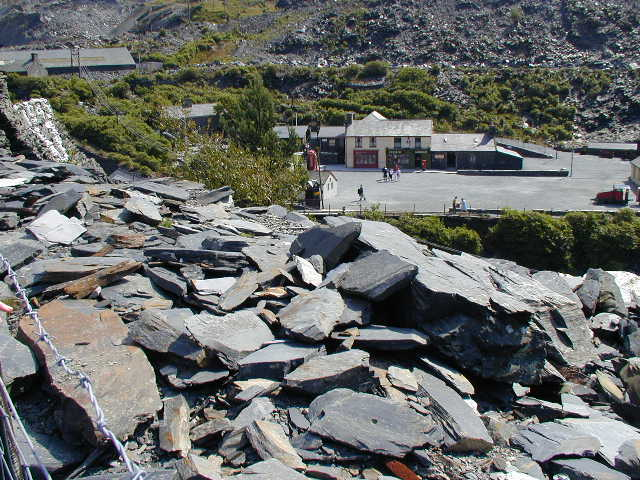
- Tips at the quarry in 2000

- Location in Gwynedd
- Location: Blaenau Ffestiniog, Gwynedd, Wales, UK; 53.0021°N 3.9347°W
- Products: Slate
- Type: Quarry
- Opened: 1846

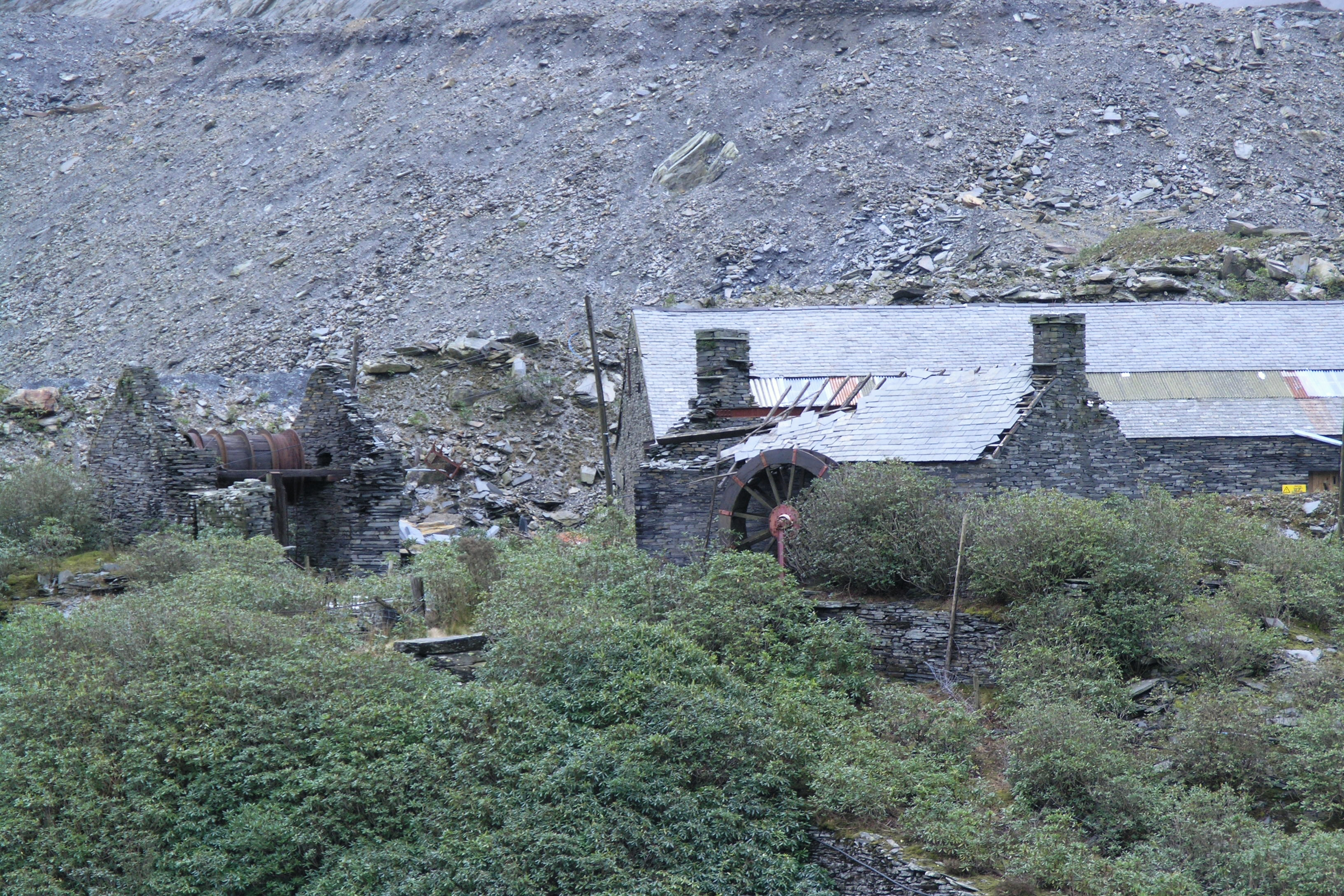
Quarry buildings at Llechwedd

Llechwedd quarry (Welsh pronunciation: [ɬɛχˈwɛð]) is a major slate quarry in the town of Blaenau Ffestiniog, north Wales. At its peak in 1884 it produced 23,788 tons of finished slate per year and had 513 employees. It continues to produce slate on a limited scale and is the location of the Llechwedd Slate Caverns tourist attraction.

== History ==
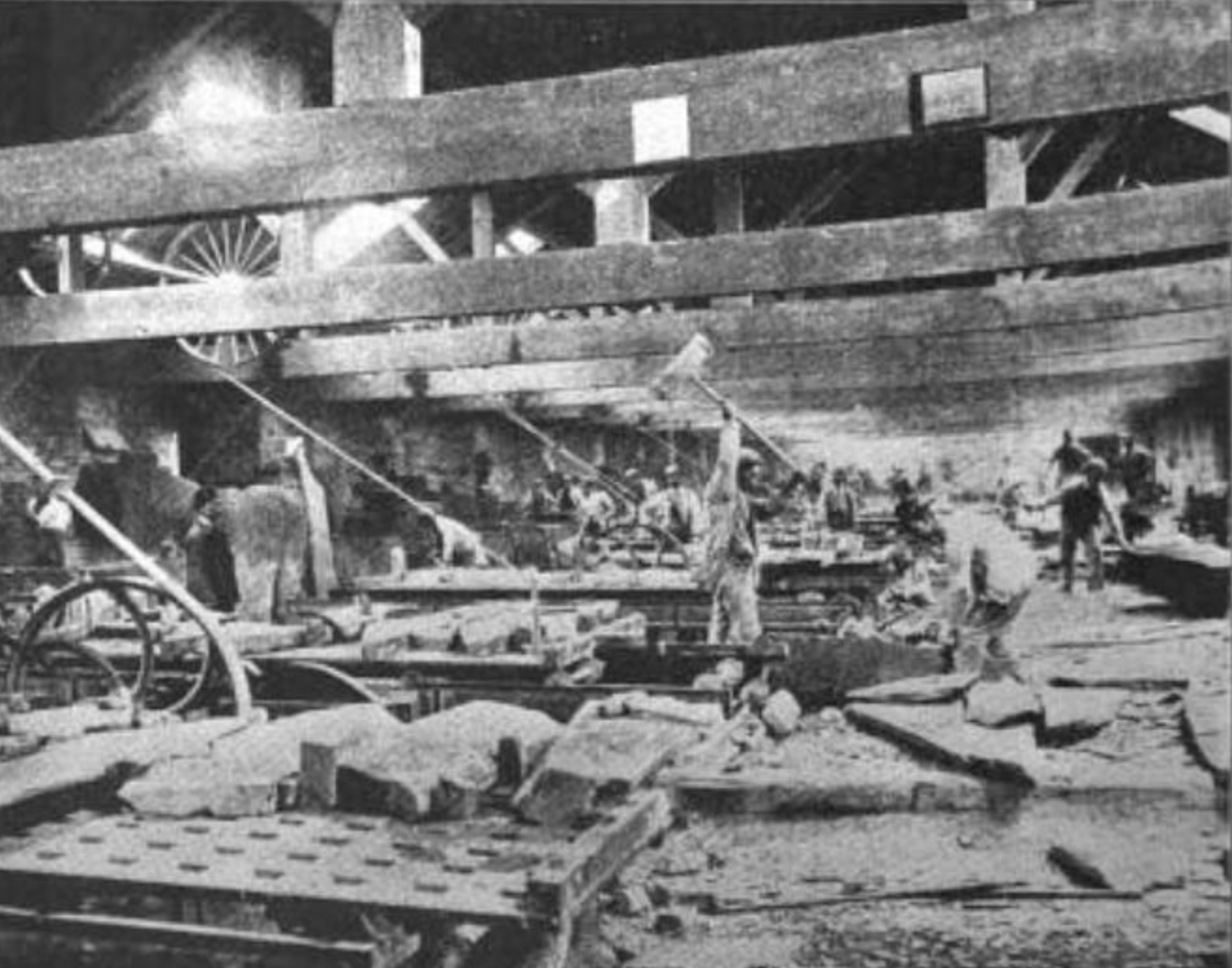
Inside the Llechwedd slate mill in the 1890s

As early as 1831, permission was sought to begin quarrying near Llechwedd Farm, however this came to nothing.

The Llechwedd slate quarry was opened in 1846 by John Whitehead Greaves, a successful quarry owner. Greaves had a history with the slate quarries at Blaenau Ffestiniog, and had proposed a railway to link the quarries with the river wharf at Dwyryd as early as 1836. When the Ffestiniog Railway was opened in 1836, connecting Blaenau Ffestiniog with the sea at Porthmadog, Greaves travelled on the historic first train.

In 1843 Greaves was elected the treasurer of the Ffestiniog Railway and in 1844 he became its chairman. This began a long association between the railway and the Greaves family.

By this time Greaves was running the Diffwys and Bowydd quarries under leases from their landowners. In 1846 Greaves and his partner Edwin Shelton leased pasture land nearby at Llechwedd and began prospecting for slate. They gave up their rent of Bowydd at this time. By 1847 miners located the "Old Vein" at Llechwedd and development of the quarry began under the management of John's son John Ernest Greaves. An incline was built to connect the quarry with the Ffestiniog Railway (FfR) which was extended from its terminus at Dinas to meet the incline. This work was completed on 30 June 1848.

In 1851 2,900 tons of finished slate was produced by Llechwedd and shipped over the FfR and the company moved its offices to Porthmadog, the terminus of the railway. There a slate wharf dedicated to Llechwedd was built in 1853 where the quarry's products were trans-shipped to a fleet of sailing boats for transport to their markets. The quarry continued to increase production in the 1850s and 1860s, with 7,620 tons shipping in 1863.

In 1890 Llechwedd began to introduce electrical power, becoming the first quarry in the Ffestiniog area to do so. Because of the high rainfall in Blaenau Ffestiniog the quarry used its own hydro-electric generating station to provide this power.

In 1909 Richard Greaves, the son of John Ernest, became chairman of the Ffestiniog Railway.

In 1932 a Blondin aerial ropeway was installed at Llechwedd and three years later a major new mill was built. Work at the quarry continued during World War II with production increasing temporarily after the conflict. In 1957, Llechwedd started shipping out finished slates by lorry to the wharves at the LMS station at Blaenau Ffestiniog, though this practice only lasted until 1962.

The 1960s saw a steep fall in the demand for slate. Llechwedd turned their attention to other potential sources of revenue, and in 1972 opened the Llechwedd Slate Caverns tourist attraction. The same year the quarry owners purchased Diphwys Casson Quarry to the south. In 1975, further consolidation occurred when Llechwedd also purchased Votty & Bowydd Quarry, Maenofferen Quarry and Rhiwbach Quarry.

Quarry operations continue at Llechwedd in 2013, though on a limited scale and using open cast mining techniques. The owners are also untopping Votty & Bowydd and Maneofferen quarries.

== Hydro-Electric Plant ==
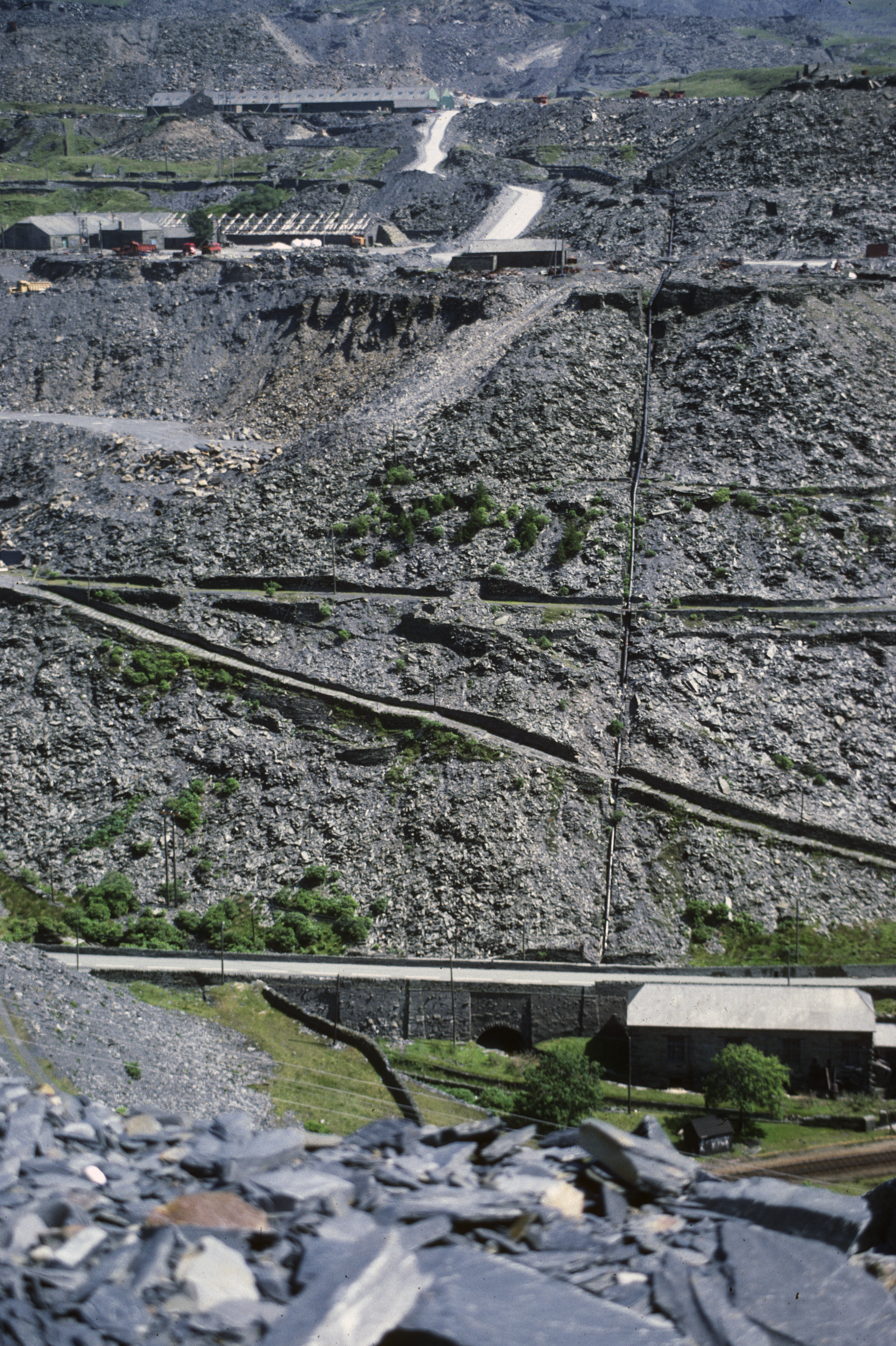
Pant yr Afon hydro electric plant: penstock and powerhouse in the lower right corner

Llechwedd slate quarry has two hydro electric plants, the first opened in April 1904 at Pant yr Afon, and the second at Maenofferen in 1911. They both generate power today having been shut down in 1998 and equipped with new generators reopening in 2010, with surplus now going to the national grid. Power output is 400 kW.

The early adoption of electric power at Llechwedd was down to Warren Roberts who was promoted to quarry manager in the late 1880s. The first hydro-electric power was generated at the quarry in 1891, and although Warren died before the full scheme could be realised, the owners of the quarry saw the plans through and built the Pant Yr Afon plant with two D.C. turbines producing 500 Volts. The original Gilbert Gilkes & Co turbines and 175kw DC Johnson and Philips generators have been preserved out of use.

The investment in generating their own electric power led to the adoption of overhead electric power for the quarry railway, with two of the Bagnall steam locomotives being converted to electric in 1927 and 1930.

== Transport ==
=== Locomotives ===
| Name | Type | Builder | Date | Works number | Notes |
|---|---|---|---|---|---|
| Freda | 0-4-0VB | De Winton | 1874 | | Sold to Tonfananu quarry 1898; scrapped about 1906 |
| | 0-4-0VB | De Winton | 1879 | | Sold or scrapped around 1898 |
| Edith | 0-4-0IST | W.G. Bagnall | 1890 | 1278 | Converted to The Coalition, 1931 |
| Margaret | 0-4-0IST | W.G. Bagnall | 1895 | 1445 | Converted to The Eclipse |
| Dorothy | 0-4-0ST | W.G. Bagnall | 1899 | 1568 | Dismantled to be converted to overhead electric in the 1930s. Remains purchased by Rich Morris in 1973 and moved to Gloddfa Ganol, later at Bala Lake Railway. |
| No. 1 | 4wBE | British Electric Vehicles | 1921 | 302 | Preserved at Llechwedd Slate Caverns |
| No. 2 | 4wBE | British Electric Vehicles | 1921 | 323 | Preserved Alan Keef |
| Welsh Pony | 4wBE | British Electric Vehicles | 1926 | 640 | Out of use 1964. Preserved West Lancashire Light Railway |
| The Eclipse | 0-4-0OE | Llechwedd | 1927 | | Electric locomotive built on the chassis of Margaret at the quarry. Supplied from overhead electrical wires |
| The Coalition | 0-4-0OE | Llechwedd | 1931 | | Electric locomotive built on the chassis of Edith at the quarry. Supplied from overhead electrical wires |
| No. 3 | 4wBE | Wingrove & Rogers | 1935 | | |
| | 4wPM | Llechwedd | 1936 | | Built at the quarry from a Morris road lorry; out of use by 1964 |
| | 4wBE | Wingrove & Rogers | 1936 | 918 | Ex Maenofferen Quarry 1947 Later returned to, and now out of use at, Maenofferen |
