= Votty & Bowydd quarry =

Slate quarry in North Wales

Votty & Bowydd
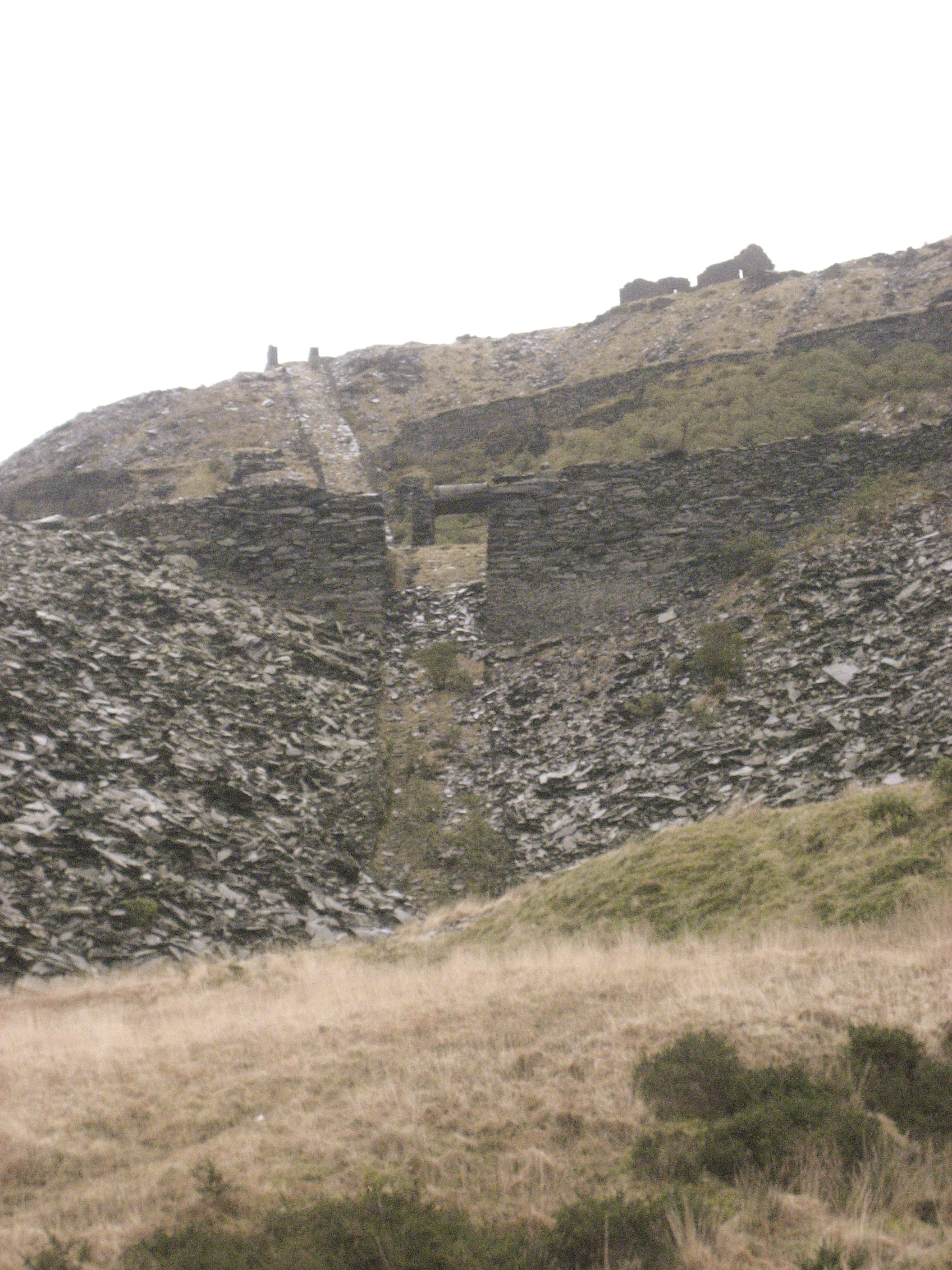
- The remains of the main cable-worked-incline flight through Votty & Bowydd quarry
- Interactive map of Votty & Bowydd
- Location: near Blaenau Ffestiniog, Gwynedd, Wales, UK
- Products: Slate
- Type: Quarry
- Opened: 1870
- Active: 1870 - 1962; 1980s - present
- Company: Greaves family

Votty & Bowydd quarry (also known as Lord quarry) is a major slate quarry in the town of Blaenau Ffestiniog, North Wales. It was one of the major users of the Ffestiniog Railway. It opened in 1870 In the quarry's peak years around 1900, the quarry produced around 17,000 tons-per-annum (15,000 tonnes-per-annum) of slate, employing 500 men. It continues to produce crushed slate on a limited scale under the ownership of the nearby Llechwedd quarry.

== History ==
=== Early Workings ===
To the north east of the town of Blaenau Ffestiniog is the valley of Cenunant y Diphwys. The land was owned by Lord Newborough, Glynllyfon (this is why Bowydd quarry is sometimes called Lord quarry). In the 1760s men from the long established Cilgwyn quarry near Nantlle started quarrying in this area, which was known for its slate beds. The exact location of this original quarry has been obliterated by subsequent mining activity, but it is likely that it was on the site of Diphwys Casson quarry, near the boundary with Votty & Bowydd.

=== Bowydd quarry ===
The Bowydd quarry was first commercially worked by John Whitehead Greaves of Barford, Warwickshire, in 1833; it had previously been worked on a small scale from c.1800s, but not commercially. Greaves also later founded the nearby Llechwedd quarry, in 1846.

=== Votty quarry ===
The Votty quarry was first commercially worked in the 1850s, by the Percival family, from Northampton; it also had previously been worked on a small scale since the c.1800s.

=== Votty & Bowydd (merged) ===
In 1870, the Votty and Bowydd quarries merged. The new (merged) Votty & Bowydd quarry was owned by the Percival family, who continued to own it, latterly with others, until 1933. By 1882, the merged quarry was producing nearly 12,100 tons of slate and employing nearly 350 men. Its peak output, at the end of the nineteenth century, was over 17,000 tons annually and employing 500 men.

In 1899, a major roof collapse occurred at the quarry, on floors A, B, and C, in the Old Vein and Back Vein workings beyond chamber 6.

In 1899–1900, Votty & Bowydd became the first quarry in North Wales to undertake a significant electrification scheme, building a hydro-electric power station at Dolwen.

After the First World War, the slate industry declined. Votty & Bowydd was acquired in 1933 by the owners of nearby Oakeley quarry. It continued to be worked until 5 October 1962 when it was closed down. The company was liquidated in 1964.

The workings were sold to the owners of the adjacent Maenofferen quarry, which in turn was acquired by the Greaves family, owners of Llechwedd quarry. Since the mid-1980s, Llechwedd has been untopping the Votty & Bowydd underground chambers.

== Description ==
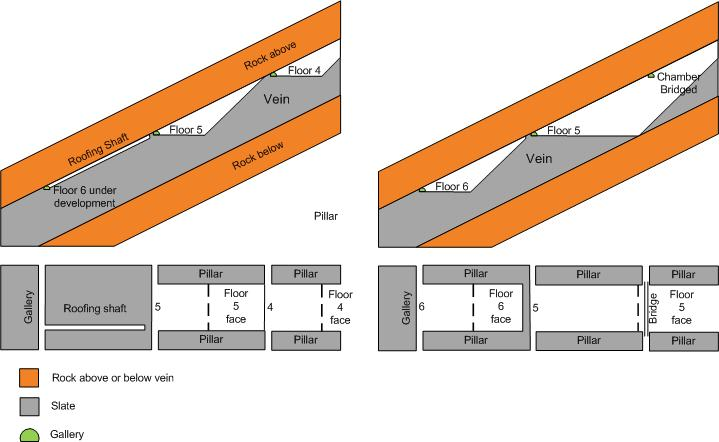
Method used for underground slate quarrying in the Blaenau Ffestiniog region

The Bowydd quarry was primarily an open-cast quarry. The Votty quarry was further east and considerably lower, and was an underground mine. After the upper Votty chambers reached the lower workings of the Bowydd quarry the quarries were combined and further working was primarily underground. The main adit was on the office level at the top of an incline from Duffws station. The adits on the higher levels were mostly abandoned before the Second World War.

== Transport ==
Votty quarry, which operated from 1830, never had any direct rail access, the slate being brought out via Bowydd. In 1854 a direct connection from Bowydd quarry to the Festiniog Railway was made by an incline, though in 1863 this was replaced by the Rhiwbach No. 1 incline of the newly constructed Rhiwbach Tramway. By 1880 most slate was going out by a connection made part-way down the Diffwys incline.

The following locomotives are known to have worked at Votty & Bowydd:

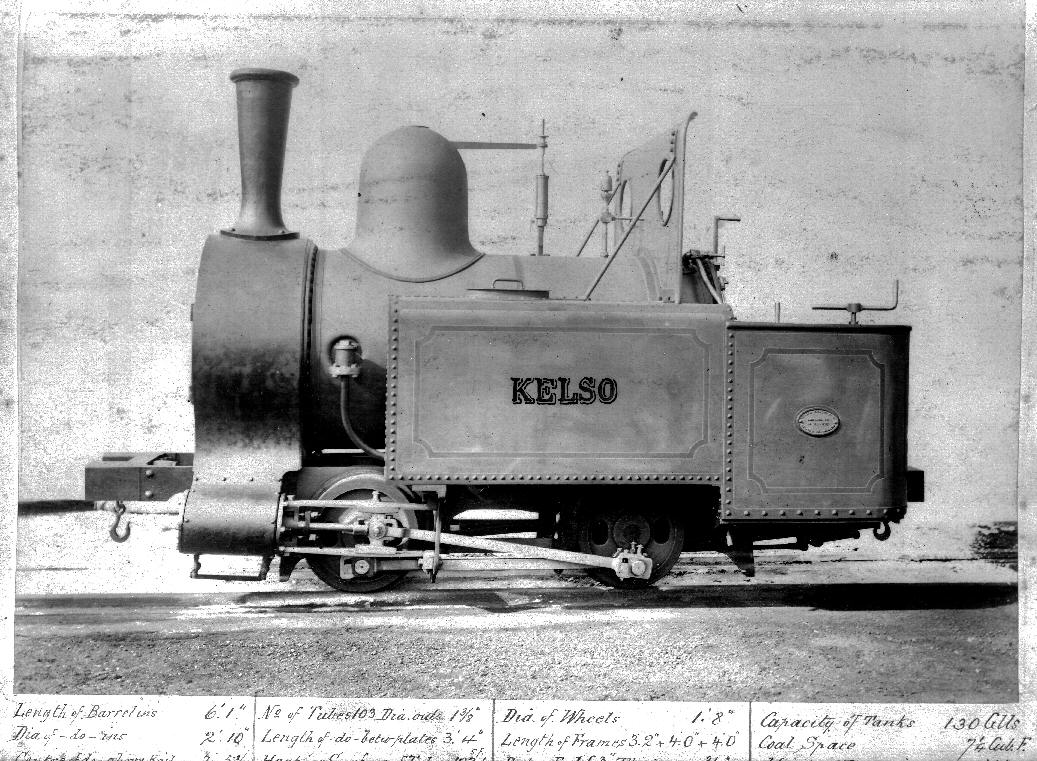
Vulcan Foundry 0-4-0T locomotive "Kelso" of 1878, later renamed "Taffy"

| Name | Type | Builder | Date | Works number | Notes |
|---|---|---|---|---|---|
| Taffy | 0-4-0T | Vulcan Foundry | c.1878 | possibly 810 | Worked at the quarry from about 1880. Was repaired at Boston Lodge in 1913. Scrapped, but frames re-used to create No. 8. |
| Meirion | 0-4-0ST | Manning Wardle | 1874 | 487 | ex-Locke & Co. Normanton. Out of use by 1916 and then scrapped. |
| | 0-4-0ST | Bagnall | 1919 | 2091 | Sold to Dorothea quarry in March 1930. Preserved at the Statfold Barn Railway. |
| Janet Jones | 4wBE | - | - | - | Worked underground. |
| | 4wPM | Deutz | | 1926 | Sold to Dorothea quarry in March 1930. Believed scrapped. |
| | 4wDM | Ruston (engine builder) | 1936 | 177638 | Transferred from Oakeley quarry |
| | 4wDM | Ruston & Hornsby | 1952 | 264252 | Transferred to Oakeley Quarry in 1962. |
