= Oakeley quarry =

Slate quarry in North Wales

Oakeley
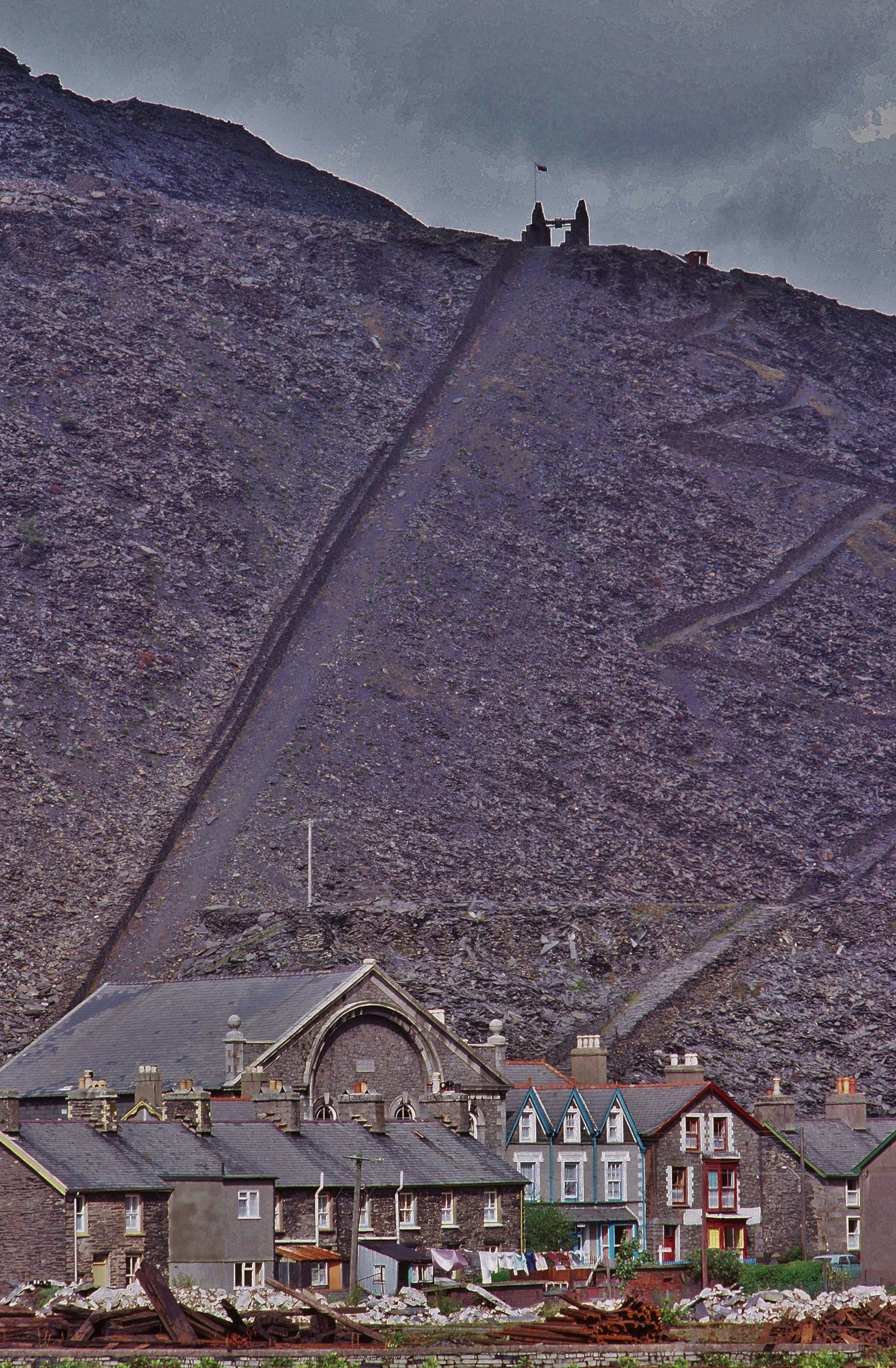
- The disused main incline from Oakeley quarry to the Ffestiniog Railway in 1977

- Location in Gwynedd
- Location: Blaenau Ffestiniog, Gwynedd, Wales; 53.0032°N 3.9483°W
- Products: Slate
- Type: Quarry
- Opened: 1818
- Closed: March 2010

Oakeley quarry is a slate quarry in the town of Blaenau Ffestiniog, north Wales. It was the largest underground slate mine in the world, and had 26 floors spanning a vertical height of nearly 1,500 feet (460 m).

== History ==
=== The early quarries ===
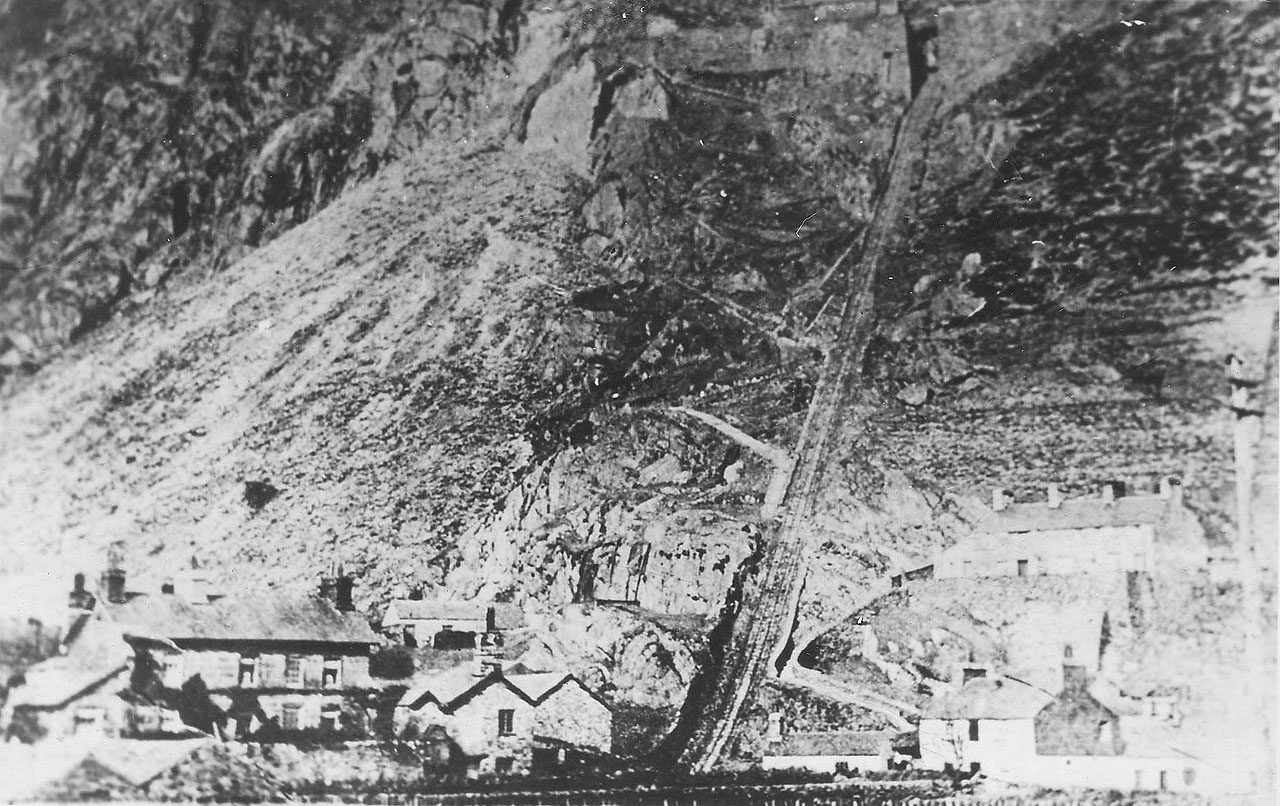
The 1839 incline connecting Holland's Quarry with the Festiniog Railway at Dinas

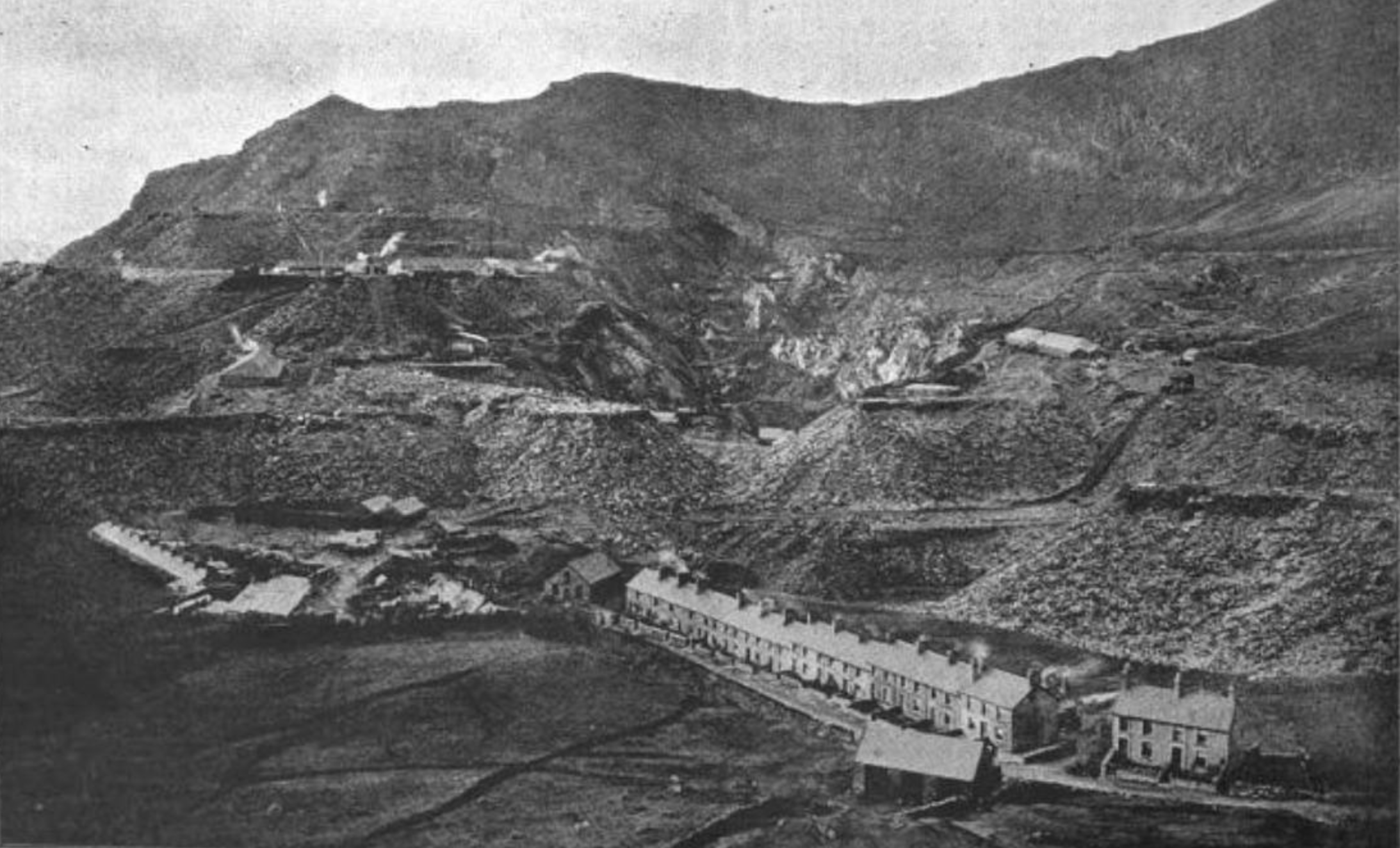
A view of Oakeley Slate Quarries in the 1890s

The first slate quarry on the site of what was to become Oakeley, was begun in 1818 when Samuel Holland, a Liverpool merchant, leased land near Rhiwbryfdir farm. The landlords, the Oakeley family of Tan y Bwlch took a 10% royalty for the three-year lease. In 1821, at the end of the initial three years, Holland took a further 21-year lease on the site, but he sold this in 1825 to the Welsh Slate Company which considerably extended the quarry. The Welsh Slate Co.'s undertaking was the lowest on the mountain it became known as Lower Quarry - also known as Lord Palmerston's Quarry.

Holland opened a new quarry above Lower Quarry at Cesail. In 1827, Holland gave over control of this company to his son, also called Samuel Holland. This quarry was variously known as Hollands Quarry, Gloddfa'r Gesail and finally Upper Quarry. In 1839 Holland's Upper Quarry became one of the first to send slate on the newly opened Ffestiniog Railway. In 1842 as the original 21-year lease expired, Holland and the Welsh Slate Company negotiated a new lease from the Oakeley family. The new lease was granted provided some land was given up by both enterprises to allow a third quarry to be opened. This was Middle Quarry also known as Gloddfa Ganol and was operated by the Rhiwbryfdir Slate Company.

The younger Holland was known as a reasonable employer, although in the early years he frequently had trouble with the workforce. But he managed to avoid the significant industrial action that was interrupting production at other Welsh slate quarries in this period.

By 1840 the slate that could be easily accessed by surface quarrying with contemporary methods was exhausted, so the quarries began underground mining. Complex arrangements were written into the leases to ensure that the underground workings did not conflict. Production at all three quarries continued to expand and during the early 1870s the production and profits hit their peaks.

=== The formation and expansion of Oakeley ===
The leaseholds for the Upper and Middle quarries expired in 1878 and the landowner, W.E. Oakeley refused to renew them, instead consolidating the two quarries into a single operation, the Oakeley quarry. The Welsh Slate Company had negotiated a lease extension some years before expiry, so it continued to work Lower Quarry as a separate operation.

Problems caused by the complex but separate workings had arisen as early as the 1860s. The Welsh Slate Company's Lower Quarry mine extended directly beneath that of the Middle Quarry, its progress was limited by the speed with which the Middle Quarry progressed, because both were working the same vein of slate. But the Middle Quarry was mining more slowly than the Welsh Slate Company desired, so the latter had taken the dangerous decision to remove slate from the walls that supported the workings above. This literally undermined the Middle Quarry workings and during the 1870s underground rockfalls became an increasing concern.

On 6 December 1882 a major rockfall forced the Welsh Slate Company to shut down all operations. The instability in the mine continued, culminating in a much larger fall on 16 February 1883. This Great Fall saw 6.25 million tons of rock fall in a single event, severely damaging the workings. As well as the physical damage to the quarries, the fall triggered a lawsuit between the Oakeley Company and the Welsh Slate Company which the Welsh Slate Company lost. Unable to pay the resulting fine, the Welsh Slate Company gave up its lease and the Oakeley was finally amalgamated into a single operation.

Oakeley was located on the north side of Allt-fawr. On the south side lay Cwmorthin quarry had by the 1880s developed into a significant operation. There was also the smaller Nyth-y-Gigfran quarry working on the eastern cliffs of Allt Fawr. Oakeley took over Nyth-y-Gigfran in the late 1880s, connecting with the mine underground. At the same time, Cwmorthin suffered its own rockfall and in 1900 it too was taken over by and connected to Oakeley. At their peak these combined quarries produced 60,000 tons of slate annually and were the third largest in the United Kingdom.

In 1906, Oakeley began using electricity generated at the Cwm Dyli power plant. The plant generated the equivalent of 1,930 hp, which was claimed to make it the largest hydro-electric power supply in Great Britain at the time. Power from the plant was carried to the quarry using an overhead transmission line via Roman Bridge and the Crimea Pass.

=== 20th century ===
Despite modernisation efforts, the first decade of the twentieth century saw a sharp decline in the Welsh slate industry. This was caused by a combination of a slump in the British building industry, competition from foreign slate producers, particularly France, and an increase in the use of roofing tiles instead of slate. Oakeley was no exception to this, and by 1908 it had more than a year's worth of output stockpiled awaiting buyers.

The Oakeley Slate Quarries Company also took over the nearby Votty & Bowydd quarry in 1933 and Diphwys Casson Quarry in 1936. Oakeley continued to produce significant tonnages of slate through World War II, but experienced a rapid decline in the 1960s, along with the remainder of the British slate industry. The quarry closed in 1969, and the company was liquidated and wound down in 1972.

=== Gloddfa Ganol ===
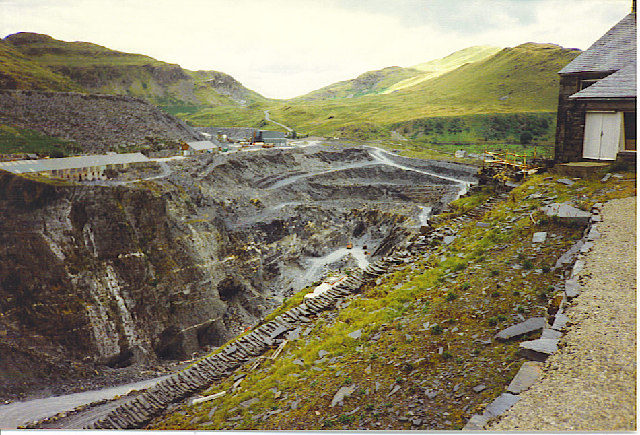
A 1990 view of Gloddfa Ganol showing the modern open-cast working

The quarry re-opened as a working quarry and tourist attraction in 1978 under the name Gloddfa Ganol. The tourist operation included an extensive collection of narrow gauge locomotives, many connected to the Welsh slate industry. Two parts of the Oakeley underground workings were opened to visitors and the working mill could also be viewed. The commercial operation, under the name Ffestiniog Slate Co. reworked parts of the previously underground mine as an opencast quarry.

=== McAlpine ===
The Ffestiniog Slate Co. was sold to McAlpine in 1998 and the tourist side of the business was closed. The quarry continued to operate using heavy earth moving equipment to continue and expand the previous open-cast operation.

=== Final Closure ===
In March 2010 Welsh Slate announced the quarry's closure, due to the discovery of subsidence. The remaining workers would be transferred to another of the company's quarries.

== Transportation ==
=== Connection to Festiniog Railway ===
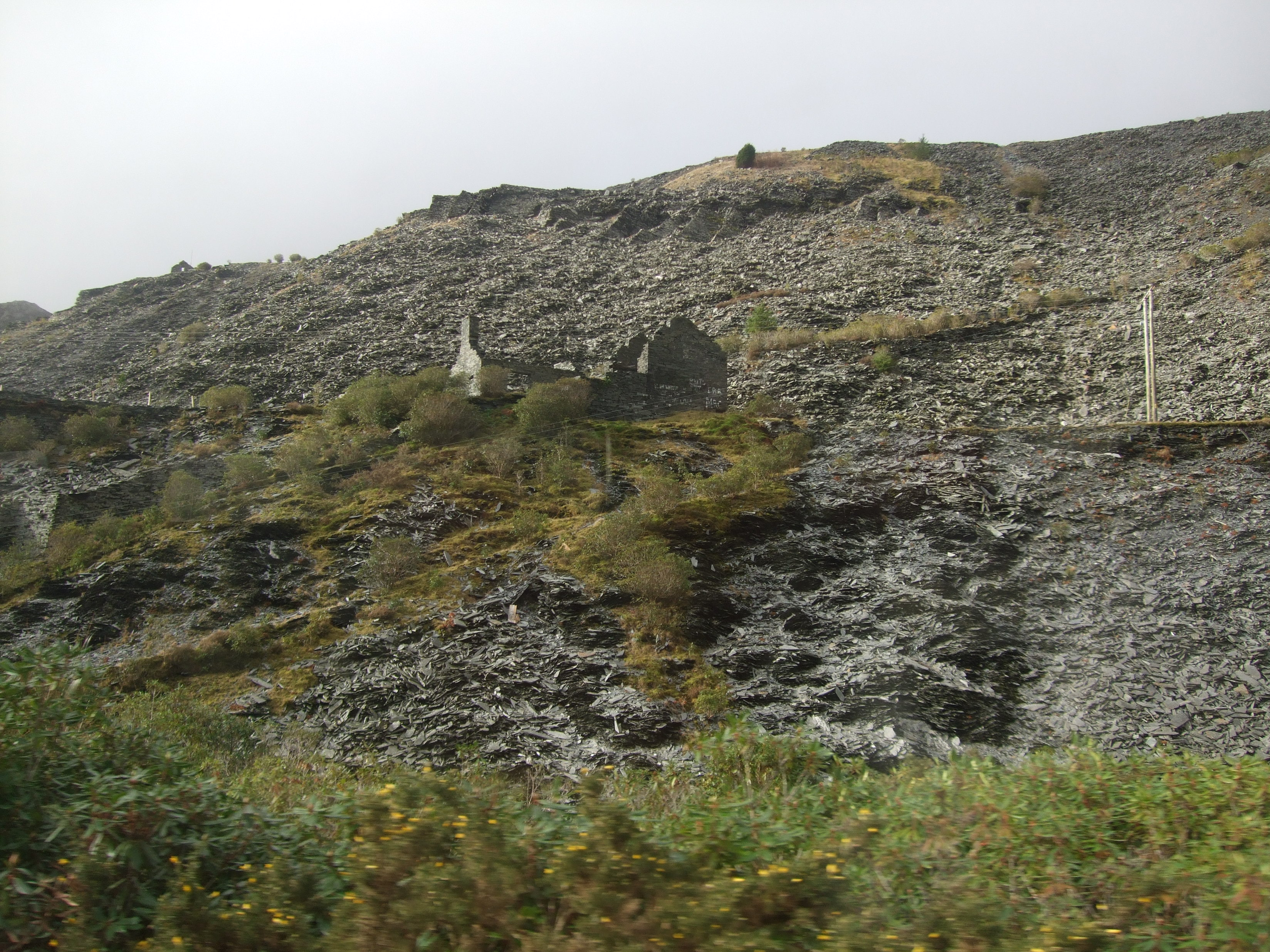
The remains of the Welsh Slate Company's incline connection with the Ffestiniog Railway

The Festiniog Railway arrived in the slate region of what is now Blaenau Ffestiniog in 1836. It provided a cheap and efficient connection with the wharves at Porthmadog and therefore with the wider British and world markets. The quarries which made use of the railway were able to substantially reduce their overall costs and therefore increase their profits. The first quarry to use the railway was Holland's Lower Quarry. Initially Holland's slates had to be carted to the railway's terminus at Rhiwbryfdir as the Welsh Slate Company had successfully blocked his attempt to complete a direct connection via an incline. By 1839 agreement had been reached over the route of an incline to the Festiniog Railway, and slates from Holland's quarry were now sent directly onto the railway.

Oakeley continued to send slate over the Ffestiniog Railway until the closure of the railway in August 1946. But there were constant disputes between the Ffestiniog and Oakeley over the rates for slate shipment. In 1930 the quarry built an incline down from their Pen y Bont mill to connect to the LNWR exchange yard in Blaenau Ffestiniog. Significant tonnages of slate were sent over this link until the closure of the quarry in 1970.

=== Internal tramways ===
Oakeley made extensive use of internal tramways, with more than 50 mi (80 km) of track underground alone. The track throughout was approximately 2 ft (610 mm) gauge, small enough for workers to move loaded wagons by hand and the same as the Ffestiniog Railway. Underground the tramways were almost exclusively worked by hand, on the surface extensive use of steam and internal combustion locomotives was made. The great depth of the mine meant that extensive use of inclines was made to move slate to the mills on the surface for processing. Inclines were also used to lower finished slates down to the Ffestiniog and London and North Western Railways.

The main entry point to the underground workings for the period from the 1880s to the 1960s was the K Trwnc incline. This was one of the steepest and longest inclines in the Welsh slate industry. It began near the bottom of Sinc Fawr the large pit towards the north of the site. From here it descended into the main mine complex, dropping three hundred feet below ground. It descended at 45° which was too steep to allow wagons to use on their own wheels. Instead two 6 ft (1,829 mm) gauge carriages ran on the incline. These had a horizontal upper platform on which 2 ft (610 mm) gauge rails were placed to allow the quarry wagons to ascend and descend. Because slate had to be hauled up the incline from below, it was powered. Initially the power was provided by a stationary steam engine. In 1906 the K Trwnc was converted to electrical power using a 100 hp (75 kW) 500V A.C. motor supplied with power by the quarry's hydro electric generating station.

=== Locomotives ===
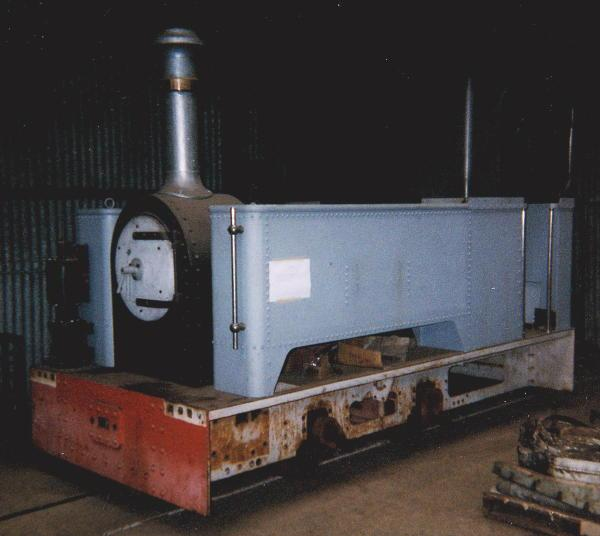
Ex-Oakeley locomotive Diana under restoration at Alan Keef in 1999

Locomotives known to have worked at Oakeley quarry. All information from unless otherwise stated.

Name	Type	Builder	Date	Works number	Notes
Meirion	0-4-0ST	Manning Wardle	1874	487	A "Locke" class loco, similar in appearance to Manning Wardle's "Woolwich" class. Built for colliery owner Joseph Locke of Normanton, West Yorkshire. Around 1900 it was purchased to work at the Votty & Bowydd quarry. In 1913 it was repaired at Boston Lodge though it was not used after this.
Mary Oakeley	0-4-0	Falcon	1884	-	Scrapped c. 1900
William	0-4-0T	Adamson	1885	-	Scrapped
Mary Caroline	0-4-0T	Adamson	1888	-	Scrapped c. 1931
Edward	0-4-0T	Adamson	1888	-	Scrapped.
Algernon	0-4-0G	J.H. Wilson and Co.	1875	-	Rebuilt from the Welsh Slate Co. locomotive Mole. Scrapped.
Charles	0-4-0T	Adamson	1890	-	Scrapped c.1931,
Snowdon	0-4-0ST	W.G. Bagnall	1899	1569	Scrapped,
Eileen	0-4-0ST	W.G. Bagnall	1918	2045	Purchased second hand from the Ministry of Munitions. Scrapped.
Diana	0-4-0T	Kerr Stuart	1909	1158	Purchased from the Kerry Tramway. Sold to Pen-yr-Orsedd Quarry in 1940. It was restored to working order in 2015 and in 2018 it is based at Amerton Railway
Algernon	0-4-0WT	Hudson		1028	Scrapped.
Clifford	0-4-0WT	Hudswell Clarke	1915	1142	Purchased from Nottingham in 1924. Scrapped.
Kidbrooke	0-4-0ST	W.G. Bagnall	1917	1043	Purchased from RASC depot at Kidbrooke. Out of use by 1939, sold in 1961. Currently restored to working order at the Yaxham Light Railway
-	0-4-0PM	Baguley	1917	708	Purchased from the War Department. Scrapped.
774	0-4-0PM	Baguley	1917	774	After use on the Timber Supply Department tramway at Pennal it was purchased by Oakeley in 1927. Out of use by 1939 until sold into preservation in 1966. Now at the Narrow Gauge Railway Museum in Tywyn.
Rosa	0-4-0PM	Baguley	1919	779	Purchased from the Kerry Tramway. Destroyed by fire in 1937.
-	4wDM	Deutz	-	-	Scrapped 1964
-	4wDM	W.G. Bagnall	1933	2499	Transferred to Votty & Bowydd Quarry
-	4wDM	Ruston Hornsby	1935	174139	
-	4wDM	Ruston Hornsby	1935	174140	
-	4wDM	Ruston Hornsby	1935	175145	
-	4wDM	Ruston Hornsby	1935	175986	
-	4wDM	Ruston Hornsby	1935	177598	Purchased from Hudson after service in Egypt in 1937.
-	4wDM	Ruston Hornsby	1936	177638	Transferred to Votty & Bowydd Quarry
-	4wDM	Ruston Hornsby	1936	182137	
-	4wDM	Ruston Hornsby	1959	432652	
-	4wDM	Ruston Hornsby	1952	264252	Transferred from Votty & Bowydd in 1962.

== Description ==
=== Technology ===
The Oakeley quarries were avid users of technology, allowing them to reduce their costs and increase their production. In 1856 they began to light the quarry using piped gas. A large steam-driven cutting mill was opened around 1860. Nathaniel Mathew, the owner of Middle Quarry pioneered the use of mechanical slate dressing tools at his mill. Mathew invented a slate dressing machine that carries his name.

=== Waste tipping ===
Victorian slate extraction techniques generated vast amounts of slate waste - for every ton of finished slate produced, approximately nine tons of waste rock are extracted. It is estimated that the lifetime of the Oakeley concerns, more than 100 million tons of waste was generated. The restricted location of Oakeley on the slopes of Allt-fawr made disposing of this waste a significant problem. The original village of Rhiwbryfdir and the nearby monastery of Mynachlog were purchased by Oakeley and then buried under a massive waste tip. Space was also sought on the south bank of the Afon Barlwydd and in 1854 the Glan y Don (also known as the Pen y Bont) tip was established. This tip was accessed by a high viaduct that crossed the Ffestiniog Railway's Dinas branch, the London and North Western Railway's Conway valley line and the river. This tip became so large that a mill was built on top of it for further slate processing capacity in 1875.

In 1899, further tipping space was required, so the Ffestiniog Railway's Dinas branch was diverted to allow the Doman Fawr tip on the eastern slope of Allt-fawr to be extended further south of the quarry.
