= Maenofferen quarry =

Slate quarry in Wales

Maenofferen
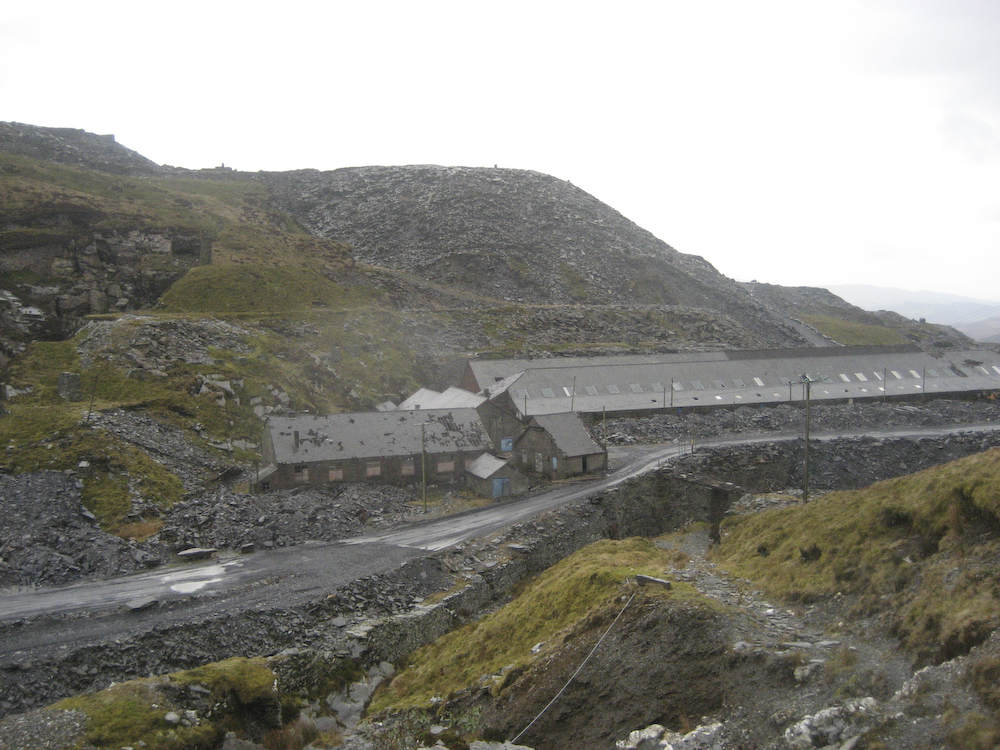
- The abandoned Maenofferen slate cutting mill, seen from the Rhiwbach Tramway No. 3 incline, 2007

- Location in Gwynedd
- Location: Blaenau Ffestiniog, Gwynedd, Wales; 53.0012°N 3.9186°W
- Products: Slate
- Type: Quarry
- Opened: c.1800

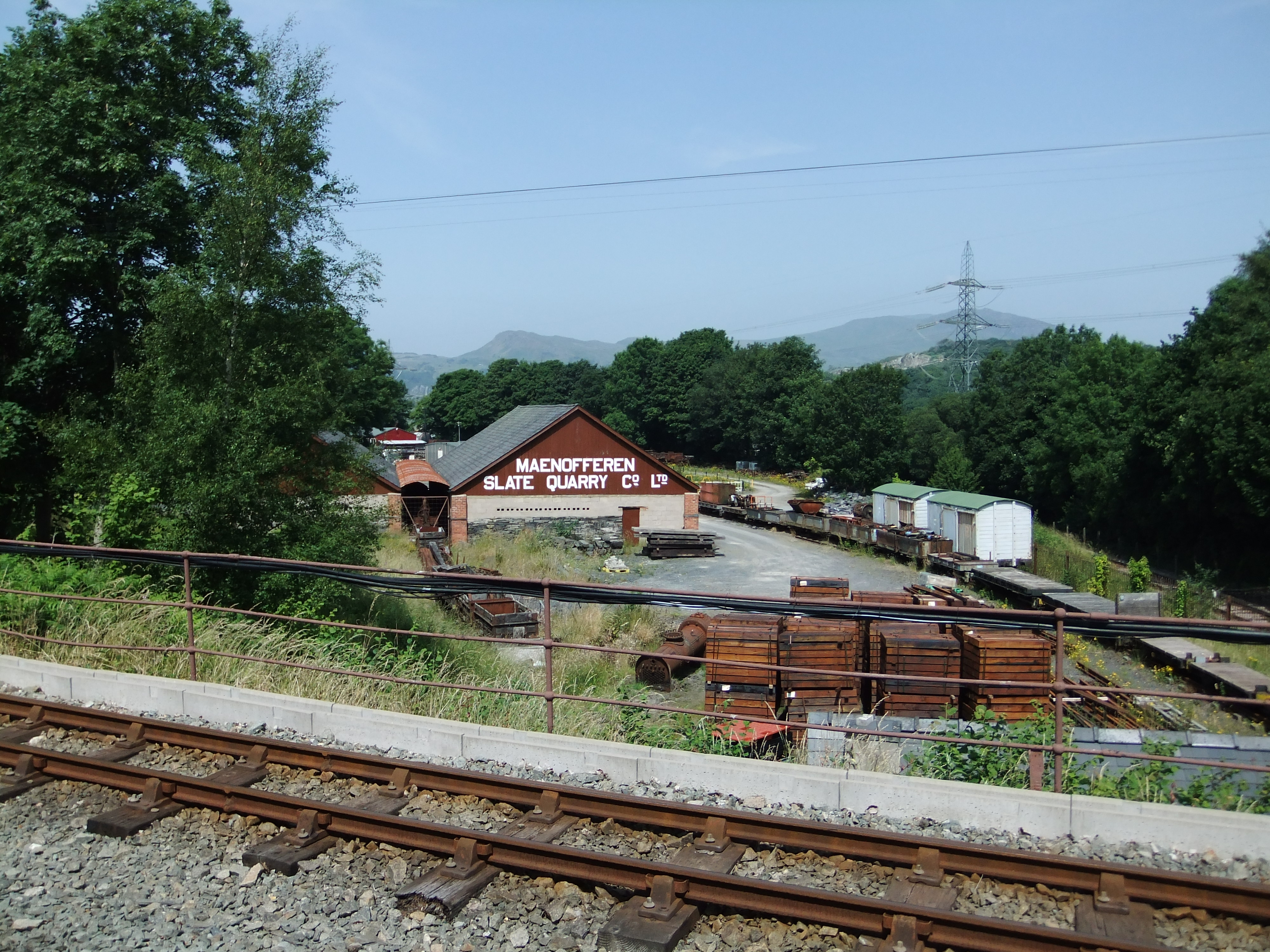
The restored Maenofferen quarry shed at Minffordd Yard on the Ffestiniog Railway

Maenofferen quarry (also known as Maen Offeren quarry) is a major slate quarry in the town of Blaenau Ffestiniog, north Wales and one of the major users of the Ffestiniog Railway. It continues to produce crushed slate on a limited scale under the ownership of the nearby Llechwedd quarry.

== History ==
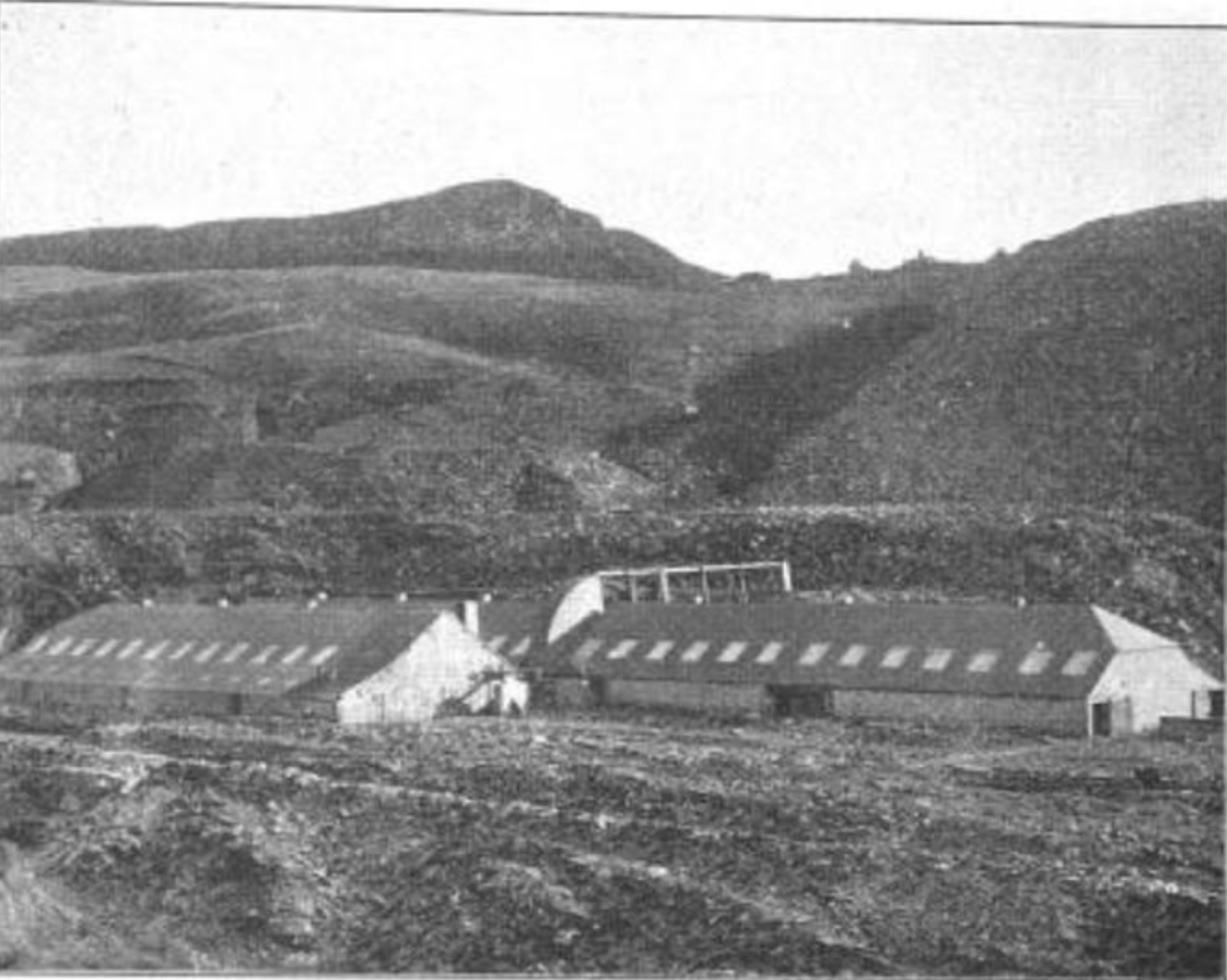
The main mills of the Maenofferen Slate Company around 1896

Maenofferen was first worked for slate by men from the nearby Diphwys quarry shortly after 1800. By 1848 slate was being shipped via the Ffestiniog Railway, but traffic on the railway ceased in 1850. In 1857 traffic resumed briefly and apart from a gap in 1865, a steady flow of slate was dispatched via the railway. The initial quarry on the site was known as the David Jones quarry which was the highest and most easterly of what became the extensive Maenofferen complex.

In 1861 the Maenofferen Slate Quarry Co. Ltd. was incorporated, led by Sir William Fothergill Cooke and Mr. Veasey. The quarry produced around 400 tons of slate that year. The company leased a wharf at Porthmadog in 1862 and shipped 181 tons of finished slate over the Ffestiniog Railway the following year.

During the nineteenth century the quarry flourished and expanded, extending its workings underground and further downhill towards Blaenau Ffestiniog. By 1897 it employed 429 people with almost half of those working underground. The Ffestiniog Railway remained the quarry's major transport outlet for its products, but there was no direct connection from it to the Ffestiniog's terminus at Duffws. Instead slate was sent via the Rhiwbach Tramway which ran through the quarry. This incurred extra shipping costs that rival quarries did not have to bear.

In 1908 the company leased wharf space at Minffordd, installing turntables and siding to allow finished slates to be transshipped to the standard gauge railway there.

In 1920 the company solved its high shipping costs by building a new incline connecting its mill to the Votty & Bowydd quarry and reaching agreement to ship its products via that company's incline connection to the Ffestiniog Railway at Duffws.

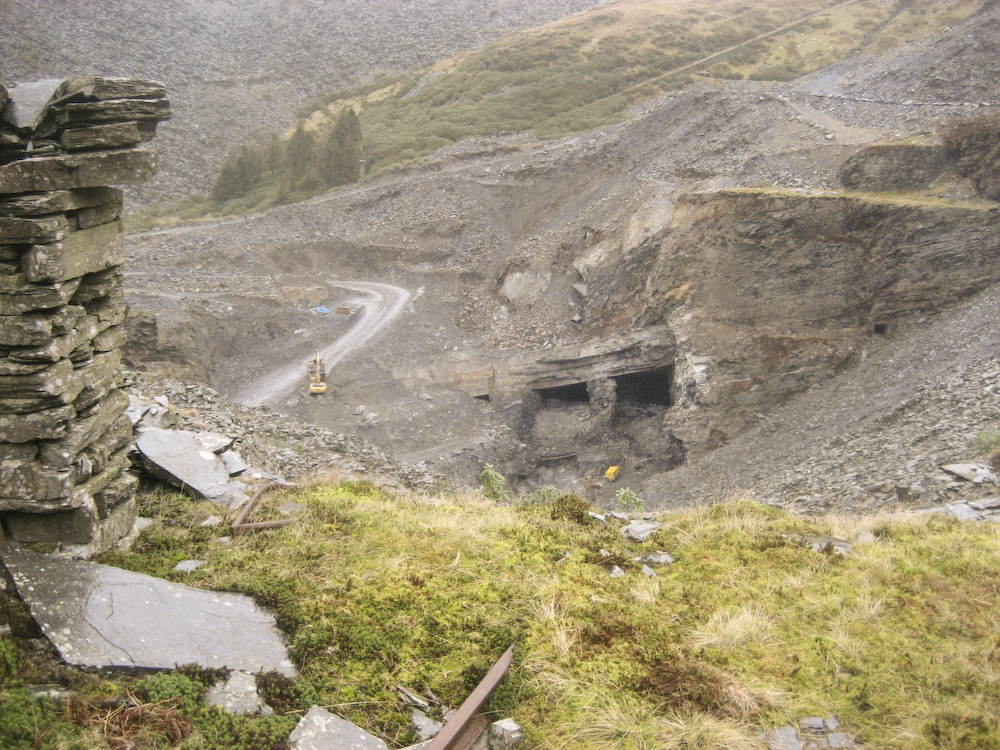
Modern untopping operations at Maenofferen. The uncovered chambers of the Bowydd workings are clearly visible

In 1928 Maenofferen purchased the Rhiwbach quarry, continuing to work it and use its associated Tramway until 1953.

Maenofferen Slate Quarry, Blaenau Ffestiniog, Wales, 2024

When the Ffestiniog Railway ceased operation in 1946, Maenofferen leased a short length of the railway's tracks between Duffws station and the interchange with the LMS railway, west of Blaenau Ffestiniog. Slate trains continued to run over this section until 1962, Maenofferen then becoming the last slate quarry to use any part of the Ffestiniog Railway's route. From 1962 slate was shipped from the quarry by road, although the internal quarry tramways including stretches of the Rhiwbach tramway continued in use until at least the 1980s.

The quarry was purchased by the nearby Llechwedd quarry in 1975 together with Bowydd, which also incorporated the old Votty workings: these are owned by the Maenofferen Company. Underground production at Maenofferen ceased during November 1999 and with it the end of large-scale underground working for slate in north Wales. Production of slate recommenced on the combined Maenofferen site, consisting of "untopping" underground workings to recover slate from the supporting pillars of the chambers. Material recovered from the quarry tips will also be recovered for crushing and subsequent use.

== Transport ==
=== Locomotives ===
Name	Type	Builder	Date	Works number	Notes
Sanford	0-4-0ST	W. G. Bagnall	1900	1571	Sold to the Penrhyn Quarry in 1929, subsequently scrapped
Skinner	0-4-0ST	W.G. Bagnall	1906	1766	Sold to Penrhyn Quarry in 1929
	4wPM	Motor Rail	1950	20073	Sold to John Crosskey, 1975 and transferred to Brockham Railway Museum. Now restored and running at the Richmond Light Railway.
	4wPM	Rhiwbach Tramway			Constructed from the parts of an Austin 7 at Rhiwbach Quarry for use on the tramway some time between 1935-37. Currently being restored to working condition at the Apedale Valley Light Railway.
	4wPM	Hibberd		1821	Scrapped 1966
	4wPM	Hibberd		1929	Scrapped 1956
	4wDM	Ruston & Hornsby	1936	174535	Sold to John Crosskey in 1975 and moved to Brockham Railway Museum.
	4wDM	Ruston & Hornsby	1936	174536	By 1975 was the spare locomotive, kept in the workshop. Derelict on site in 2012
	4wDM	Ruston & Hornsby	1935	175127	Derelict on site until 2020, given to the Ffestiniog & Welsh Highland Railway, awaiting restoration.
	4wDM	Ruston & Hornsby	1936	177638	Scrapped around 1974.
	4wDM	Ruston & Hornsby	1936	177642	Sold to John Crosskey in 1975 and moved to Brockham Railway Museum.
	4wDM	Ruston & Hornsby	1944	223687	ex Ministry of Supply. To Cwt y Bugail Quarry by 1949.
	4wDM	Ruston & Hornsby	1942	200762	Dismantled 1954, scrapped around 1974.
	4wPM	Muir Hill	?	?	ex-Rhiwbach Tramway. Used to operate the leased section of the Festiniog Railway at Duffws after 1946. Scrapped 1964-5.
	4wBE	Clayton	1969	5688/2	On site in 2012. Moved in 2020 to Alan Keef for resale along with other rolling stock and the carriages from the Miners Tramway.
	4wBE	Wingrove & Rogers	1936	918	On site in 2012.
