= List of public art in Denbighshire =

Map of Wales with Denbighshire highlighted

This is a list of public art in Denbighshire in north-east Wales. Denbighshire's borders were established in 1996 under the Local Government (Wales) Act 1994 and differ from those of the historic county of the same name. This list applies only to works of public art on permanent display in an outdoor public space and does not, for example, include artworks in museums.

== Betws Gwerfil Goch ==
Image	Title / subject	Location and coordinates	Date	Artist / designer	Type	Material	Dimensions	Designation	Wikidata	Notes
	War memorial	Maerdy Road, Betws Gwerfil Goch			Obelisk on pedestal	Granite				

== Bodelwyddan ==
Image	Title / subject	Location and coordinates	Date	Artist / designer	Type	Material	Dimensions	Designation	Wikidata	Notes
	Canadian soldiers memorial	Parish Church of St Margaret, Bodelwyddan	1919	W. Mansley & Son, monumental sculptors	Cross on pedestal	Red sandstone				
	Obelisk	Bodelwyddan Castle			Obelisk	Stone				
	Medieval knight	Bodelwyddan Castle	c. 1840		Statue in niche	Stone				

== Bodfari ==
Image	Title / subject	Location and coordinates	Date	Artist / designer	Type	Material	Dimensions	Designation	Wikidata	Notes
	War memorial	St Stephen's Church, Bodfari			Statue on pedestal	Granite				

== Carrog ==
Image	Title / subject	Location and coordinates	Date	Artist / designer	Type	Material	Dimensions	Designation	Wikidata	Notes
	War memorial	St Bridget's Church, Carrog			Wall-mounted tablet	Red marble on stone wall				
	Celtic crosses	St Bridget's Church, Carrog			Celtic wheel crosses	Stone				

== Corwen ==
Image	Title / subject	Location and coordinates	Date	Artist / designer	Type	Material	Dimensions	Designation	Wikidata	Notes
	Preaching cross	SS Mael and Sulien's Church, Corwen	c. 9th–12th centuries			Stone			Q17739976	
More images	Owain Glyndŵr	Corwen	2007	Colin Spofforth	Statue on pedestal	Bronze on stone	4.5m high			

== Denbigh ==
Image	Title / subject	Location and coordinates	Date	Artist / designer	Type	Material	Dimensions	Designation	Wikidata	Notes
	Evan Pierce memorial	Denbigh	1872	Martin Underwood (column), W. and T. Wills (statue) and Mario Raggi (panels)	Statue on pillar with relief panels	Marble, limestone and bronze	15m high	Grade II*	Q17741187	
	War memorial	St Marcella churchyard, Denbigh			Celtic cross on pedestal					
	War memorial	Crown Square, Denbigh	1923	Charles Leonard Hartwell	Statue of winged Peace on pedestal	Stone	3m high	Grade II	Q29500708	
	Henry Morton Stanley	Outside Denbigh Library	2011	Nick Elphick	Statue	Bronze				

== Glyndyfrdwy ==
Image	Title / subject	Location and coordinates	Date	Artist / designer	Type	Material	Dimensions	Designation	Wikidata	Notes
	War memorial	Beside the A5, Glyndyfrdwy			Celtic cross on pedestal	Granite				

== Llangollen ==
Image	Title / subject	Location and coordinates	Date	Artist / designer	Type	Material	Dimensions	Designation	Wikidata	Notes
More images	Pillar of Eliseg	Llangollen	c. 9th century	Cyngen ap Cadell	Pillar	Stone		Grade I	Q3090852	
More images	War memorial	Bridge St., Llangollen			Celtic wheel cross and plaque	Granite				

== Prestatyn ==
Image	Title / subject	Location and coordinates	Date	Artist / designer	Type	Material	Dimensions	Designation	Wikidata	Notes
	Pochin's fountain	High Street, Prestatyn			Fountain	Granite				
	Coat of arms	Former Council Offices, Nant Hall Road, Prestatyn			Relief plaque	Red brick				
	War memorial	Christ Church, High St., Prestatyn	1920	Leonard Barnard (architect)	Eleanor Cross on stepped base	Portland stone	6.0m high	Grade II	Q29502678	Masons: RL Boulton & Sons.
	Mother and child	Near High Street, Prestatyn			Sculpture	Bronze				
	Beginning and End	Prestatyn	2009		Sculpture	Metal				Marks the northern end of Offa's Dyke path.

== Rhuddlan ==
Image	Title / subject	Location and coordinates	Date	Artist / designer	Type	Material	Dimensions	Designation	Wikidata	Notes
	Sir William Shipley Conwy memorial	St Mary's Church, Rhuddlan			Celtic cross	Stone				
	John Lunt memorial	St Mary's Church Rhuddlan			Statue on pdestal	Stone				Memorial to John Lunt, 1825–1884, sculptor.

== Rhyl ==
Image	Title / subject	Location and coordinates	Date	Artist / designer	Type	Material	Dimensions	Designation	Wikidata	Notes
	War memorial	Garden of Remembrance, Rhyl	1904	Herbert Chatham	Statue on pedestal and 2 miniature cenotaphs	Carrara marble statue, granite pedestal				Originally constructed as a Boer War memorial, subsequently expanded and relocated.
	Clock tower	Rhyl			Clock tower	Stone & limestone				
	1853 Lifeboat tragedy	Promenade, Rhyl	2013	Mike Owens	Sculpture	Oak				
	Belgian refugee memorial	Garden of Remembrance, Rhyl	2015		Sculpture					

== Ruthin ==
Image	Title / subject	Location and coordinates	Date	Artist / designer	Type	Material	Dimensions	Designation	Wikidata	Notes
	Peers Memorial	St Peter's Square, Ruthin	1883	John Douglas	Clock tower	Stone		Grade II	Q7160462	
	Gorsedd stones	Ruthin			Stone circle	Granite				
	War memorial	Ruthin	1925	Harold Hughes	Celtic cross	Stone	3m high	Grade II	Q29507901	
	Tom Pryce memorial	Ruthin	2009	Neil Dalrymple	Relief panel	Bronze resin	2.5m by 1m			
	Lion	Ruthin Castle			Statue	Stone				
	Plas Meddyg mural	Ruthin		Maggie Humphry	Mural					

== St Asaph ==
Image	Title / subject	Location and coordinates	Date	Artist / designer	Type	Material	Dimensions	Designation	Wikidata	Notes
More images	Bible Translators' Memorial William Salesbury Richard Davies William Morgan Gabriel Goodman Edmund Prys Richard Parry John Davies Thomas Huet	St Asaph Cathedral	1892	Middleton & Prothero	Octagonal tower, loosely derived from the Eleanor crosses, with statues	Stone		Grade II	Q29481806	Unveiled 22 April 1892.
	War memorial	St Kentigern and St Asaph Parish Church, St Asaph	1920s		Celtic cross on pedestal					
	Henry Morton Stanley	St Asaph	2010	Gary and Thomas Thrussell	Pillar	Metal	4m high			
