= Early modern period in Wales =

Aspect of Welsh history

The early modern period in Wales is the period in the history of Wales from 1500 to 1800.

== Religion ==
Following Henry VIII's break with Rome and the Pope, Wales for the most part followed England in accepting Anglicanism, although a number of Catholics were active in attempting to counteract this and produced some of the earliest books printed in Welsh.

=== Welsh language ===
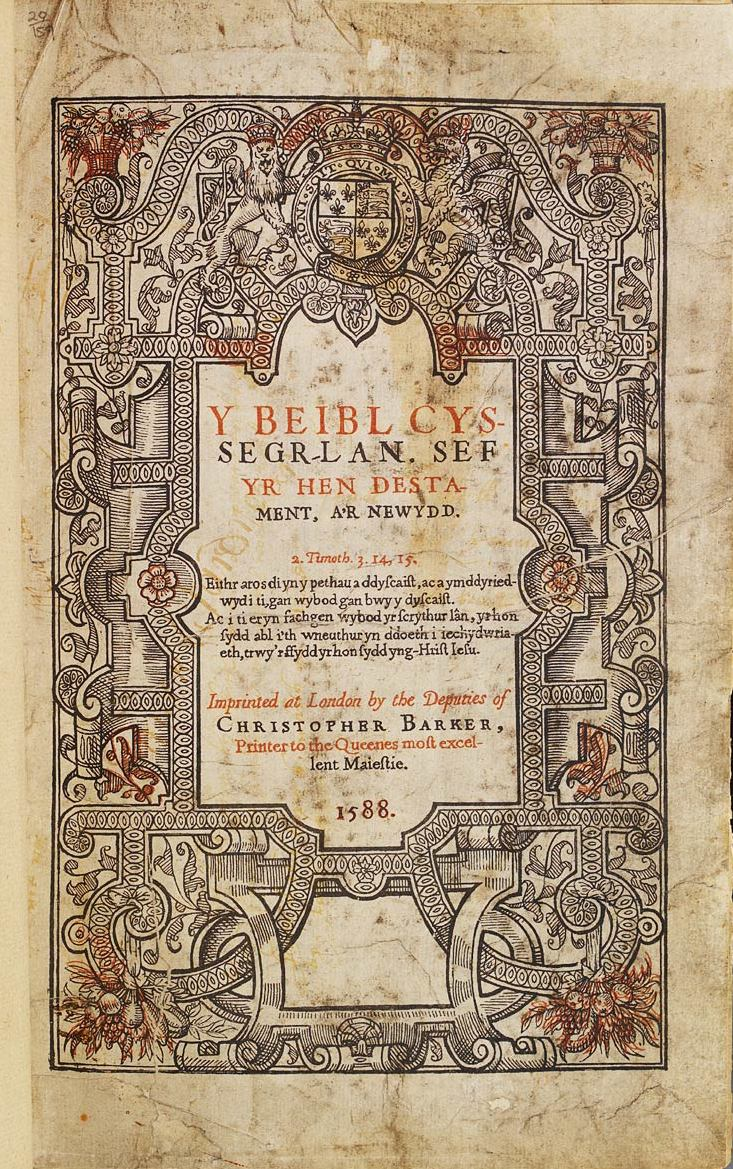
Title page of William Morgan's Welsh Bible of 1588

In 1567, Richard Davies, William Salesbury, and Thomas Huet completed the first modern translation of the New Testament and the first translation of the Book of Common Prayer (Welsh: Y Llyfr Gweddi Gyffredin). In 1588, William Morgan completed a translation of the whole Bible. These translations were important to the survival of the Welsh language and had the effect of conferring status on Welsh as a liturgical language and vehicle for worship. This had a significant role in its continued use as a means of everyday communication and as a literary language down to the present day despite the pressure of English.

In 1588, William Morgan produced the first complete translation of the Welsh Bible. Morgan's Bible is one of the most significant books in the Welsh language, and its publication greatly increased the stature and scope of the Welsh language and literature.

=== Calvinism ===
Bishop Richard Davies and dissident Protestant cleric John Penry introduced Calvinist theology to Wales. Calvinism developed through the Puritan period, following the restoration of the monarchy under Charles II, and within Wales' Methodist movement. However, few copies of Calvin's works were available before the mid-19th century.

=== Methodist revival ===
The 18th century also saw the Welsh Methodist revival, led by Daniel Rowland, Howell Harris and William Williams Pantycelyn. Nonconformity was a significant influence in Wales from the eighteenth to the twentieth centuries. The Welsh Methodist revival of the 18th century was one of the most significant religious and social movements in the history of Wales. The revival began within the Church of England in Wales and at the beginning remained as a group within it, but the Welsh revival differed from the Methodist revival in England in that its theology was Calvinist rather than Arminian. In the early 19th century the Welsh Methodists broke away from the Anglican church and established their own denomination, now the Presbyterian Church of Wales. This also led to the strengthening of other nonconformist denominations, and by the middle of the 19th century, Wales was largely Nonconformist in religion. This had considerable implications for the Welsh language as it was the main language of the nonconformist churches in Wales. The Sunday schools which became an important feature of Welsh life made a large part of the population literate in Welsh, which was important for the survival of the language as it was not taught in the schools. Welsh Methodists gradually built up their own networks, structures, and even meeting houses (or chapels), which led eventually to the secession of 1811 and the formal establishment of the Calvinistic Methodist Presbyterian Church of Wales in 1823. The Welsh Methodist revival also had an influence on the older nonconformist churches, or dissenters the Baptists and the Congregationalists who in turn also experienced growth and renewal. As a result, by the middle of the nineteenth century, Wales was predominantly a nonconformist country.

== Wars of the Three Kingdoms ==
Wales was overwhelmingly Royalist in the Wars of the Three Kingdoms in the early 17th century, though there were some notable exceptions such as John Jones Maesygarnedd and the Puritan writer Morgan Llwyd. Wales was an important source of men for the armies of King Charles I of England, though no major battles took place in Wales. The Second English Civil War began when unpaid Parliamentarian troops in Pembrokeshire changed sides in early 1648. Colonel Thomas Horton defeated the Royalist rebels at the battle of St. Fagans in May and the rebel leaders surrendered to Cromwell on 11 July after the protracted two-month siege of Pembroke.

== Education ==
Education in Wales was at a very low ebb in this period, with the only education available being in English while the majority of the population spoke only Welsh. In 1731, Griffith Jones of Llanddowror started circulating schools in Carmarthenshire, held in one location for about three months before moving (or "circulating") to another location. The language of instruction in these schools was Welsh. By Griffith Jones's death, in 1761, it is estimated that up to 250,000 people had learnt to read in schools throughout Wales.

== Industrial Revolution ==
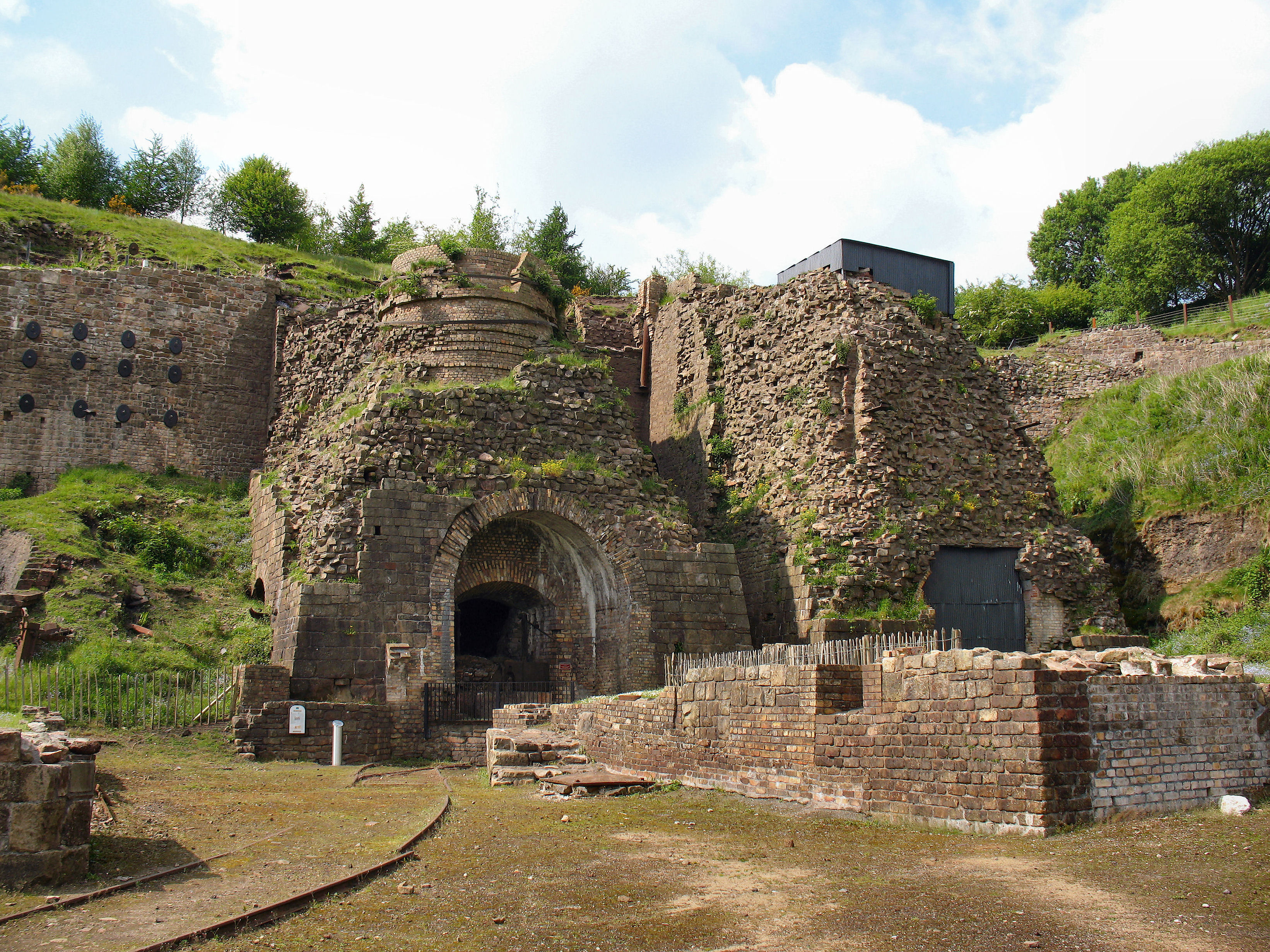
Two of the furnaces of the Blaenavon Ironworks

The end of the 18th century saw the beginnings of the Industrial Revolution, and the presence of iron ore, limestone and large coal deposits in south-east Wales meant that this area soon saw the establishment of ironworks and coal mines, notably the Cyfarthfa Ironworks and the Dowlais Ironworks at Merthyr Tydfil.
