= Bible translations into Welsh =

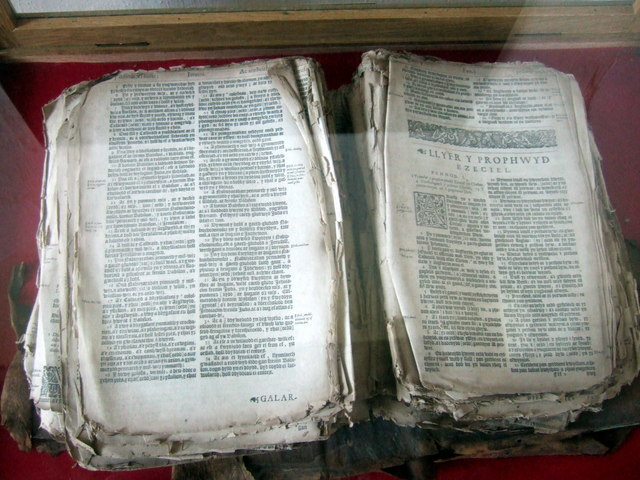
This tattered Welsh Bible from 1620 in Llanwnda church is said to have been rescued from the hands of French invaders in 1797

Parts of the Bible have been translated into Welsh since at least the 15th century, but the most widely used translation of the Bible into Welsh for several centuries was the 1588 translation by William Morgan, Y Beibl cyssegr-lan sef Yr Hen Destament, a'r Newydd as revised in 1620. The Beibl Cymraeg Newydd ("new Welsh Bible") was published in 1988 and revised in 2004. Beibl.net is a translation in colloquial Welsh which was completed in 2013.

== Historical versions ==
=== 15th century version ===
Several 19th-century sources quote the story that a translation from the Latin Vulgate was in existence in 1470 (it is said that the 16th-century Bishop Richard Davies claimed to have seen, as a boy, such a translation in a manuscript at Celydd Ifan, the house of an uncle; and another writer asserts that part of this private manuscript survived until the nineteenth century). However, Professor Glanmor Williams dismissed the idea that the whole Bible had been translated into Welsh before William Morgan's Bible appeared in 1588.

=== William Salesbury, 1567 ===
Following the English Reformation, translations were made directly from the Greek versions. In 1551 William Salesbury was responsible for the publication of the first substantial portion of the Scriptures to appear in Welsh, entitled Kynniver llith a ban, which was a translation of the Gospels and Epistles appointed to be read in Church on Sundays and Holy-days.

(Full title: Kynniver llith a ban or yscrythur lan ac a ddarlleïr yr Eccleis pryd Commun y Sulieu a'r Gwylieu trwy'r vlwyddyn: o Cambericiat W.S. "As many lessons and verses from the holy scriptures as are to be read [in] church at the time of Communion on Sundays and holy days through the year: from the Welsh translation of William Salesbury")

Translation of Bible, etc. into Welsh Act 1562
- Act of Parliament
- Parliament of England
- Long title: An Acte for the translating of the Bible and the Dyvine Service into the Welshe Tongue.
- Citation: 5 Eliz. 1. c. 28

Dates
- Royal assent: 10 April 1563

Other legislation
- Repealed by: Statute Law (Repeals) Act 1973

Status: Repealed

In 1563 a law was passed in the name of Queen Elizabeth I, the Translation of Bible, etc. into Welsh Act 1562 (5 Eliz. 1. c. 28), which instructed the Anglican Bishops in Wales and Hereford to arrange for the Bible and the Book of Common Prayer to be translated into Welsh. The work was accomplished by Richard Davies, Bishop of St David's, his cantor Thomas Huet, and William Salesbury. They worked at the Bishop's palace in Carmarthen, where they translated the New Testament from Greek. The First Epistle to Timothy, Hebrews, James, and 1 and 2 Peter were translated by Richard Davies, and Revelation was translated by Thomas Huet. However most of the work was by William Salesbury.

William Salesbury translated the Book of Common Prayer from English, which was published, together with his translation of the Psalms from Hebrew, on 6 May 1567. The New Testament was issued on 7 October 1567. They were both published by Humphrey Toy and printed in London by Henry Denham.

In 1850 Robert Griffith, a bookseller in Caernarfon, published a new edition of Salesbury's New Testament which was printed in Caernarfon by James Rees and probably edited by the clergyman, Isaac Jones (1804–50). This was faithful to the original but the orthography was updated, and it was printed in a modern font to make it easier to read.

=== William Morgan, 1588 ===
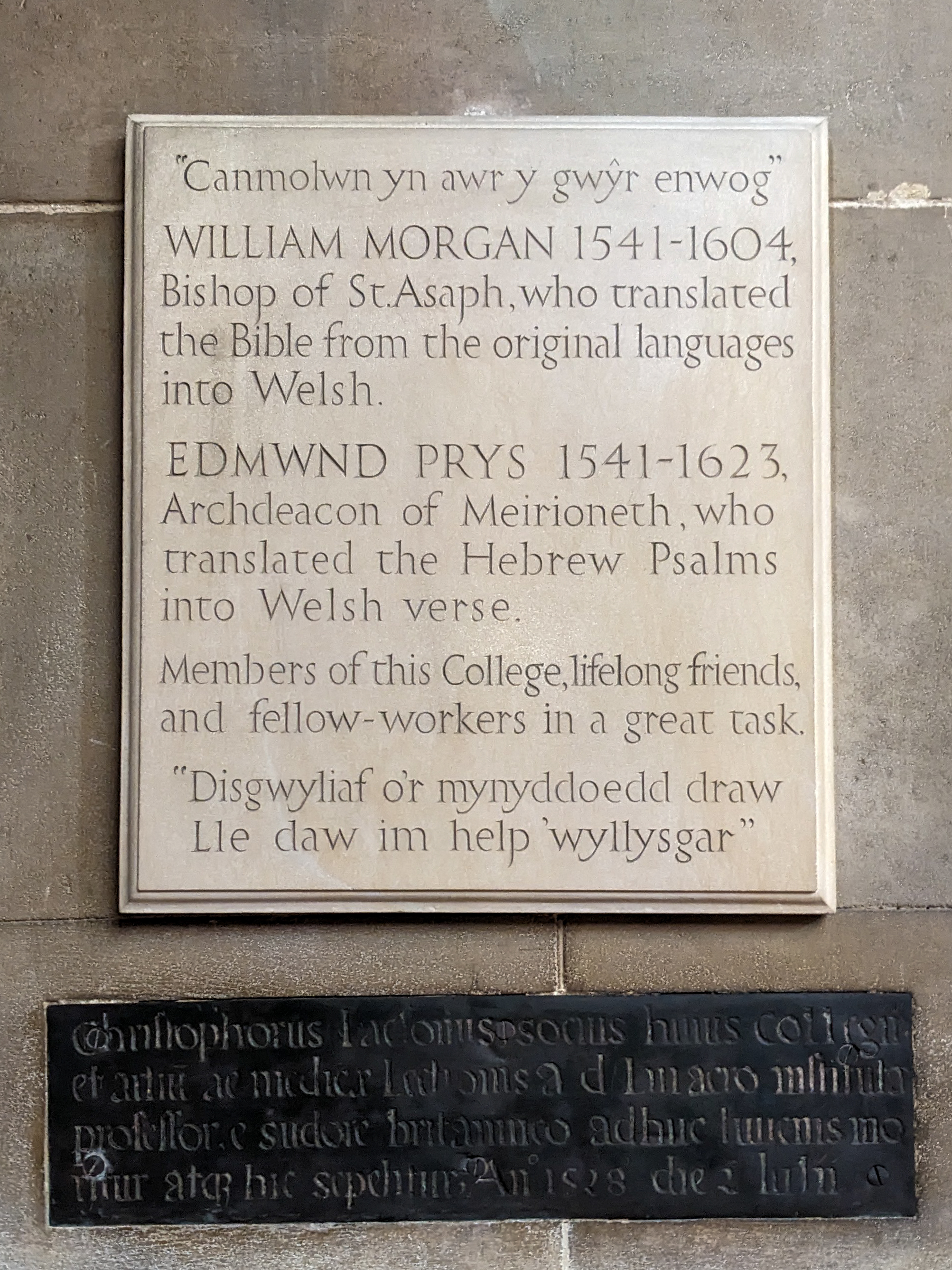
Memorial in St John's College, Cambridge to the Welsh Bible translators William Morgan and Edmund Prys; with quotations from Ecclesiasticus 44 and Psalm 121.

Salesbury's New Testament was followed by William Morgan's translation of the whole Bible in 1588, Y Beibl cyssegr-lan sef Yr Hen Destament, a'r Newydd. Morgan soon began work on a revision (or on a new translation) of his 1588 Bible, which had contained a number of printing errors; he revised Salesbury's New Testament and Psalms, and completed the rest of the books of the Old Testament and the Apocrypha.

In 1821 Richard Jones published a new edition of William Morgan's Bible which was printed in Dolgellau. This was faithful to the original but the orthography was updated, and was printed in a more modern font to make it easier to read.

=== Parry revision, 1620 ===
After Morgan's death, Bishop Richard Parry and Dr John Davies continued the work with the aims of polishing the literary language, replacing forms considered too colloquial, and bringing the text into greater conformity with the King James Version of the English Bible of 1611. The revised version of the Bible was published in 1620. This edition is still known as William Morgan's translation, and it is this rather than the previous edition which was the standard Welsh Bible until the late 20th century, and continues to be used to this day. It occupies a similar place in the Welsh language to that of the venerated King James Version in English.

The early Bible editions were large volumes intended for use in churches; in 1630 a smaller edition called "Y Beibl Bach" ("the little Bible"), intended for use in the home, was published, thus bringing scripture in Welsh into the hands of the laity.

An original copy of the Welsh Bible is displayed in St Asaph Cathedral, in St Asaph, North Wales. It was used at the investiture of Prince Charles as Prince of Wales in 1969.

The translation of the Bible into Welsh was important to the survival of the Welsh language. It had the effect, along with the Welsh translation of the Book of Common Prayer, of conferring status on Welsh as a liturgical language and a vehicle for worship. This in turn contributed to the language's continued use as a means of everyday communication down to the present day, despite the pressure of English.

The edition of the William Morgan Bible used today uses the modern orthography (spelling), updated by Professor Henry Lewis (1889-1968). He completed the New Testament in 1936 and the rest of the Bible in 1955. It was printed by the British and Foreign Bible Society as "Y Beibl". He completed the Apocrypha in 1959, and this was printed by the Society for Promoting Christian Knowledge as "Yr Apocrypha". These have now been digitised by the Bible Society and are included in their app called "ap Beibl".

The most recent editions of the William Morgan Bible (1955 edition) were printed by the Trinitarian Bible Society using the 1955 orthography.

== Psalters ==
=== William Middleton psalms, 1596 ===
William Middleton, also spelt Midleton and Myddleton, was born about 1550 at Llansannan, Denbighshire in north Wales. From 1589 Middleton worked as a ship's captain for his cousin, the merchant Sir Thomas Myddelton. Meanwhile, he worked on his dream of translating the psalms into the strict, traditional Welsh poetic style of cynghanedd, using a variety of metres. In 1595 he published Rhann o Psalmae Dauyd, a Phrophwyti eraill gweddi i kynghanedhu\ in London.

Then he set sail with Sir Francis Drake and Sir John Hopkins, as captain of the Salomon Bonaventure in their abortive expedition to capture Panama City. He completed his version of the psalms on 24 January 1595 (now 1596) whilst anchored at the uninhabited island of Scutum (today called Isla Escudo de Veraguas), off the coast of Panama. He called his psalms Psalmae y Brenhinol Brophwyd Dafydh. Middleton returned from Panama in 1596 and died shortly after his return at Falmouth in Cornwall.

William Middleton's psalms were dedicated to his cousin Sir Thomas Myddelton who lived at Chirk Castle in Denbighshire. In 1602, after William Middleton had died, his cousin Thomas Myddleton advanced £30 to print the psalms. The psalms were collected by Thomas Salisbury, who also published other items in Welsh. In 1603 he had them published in London by the printer Samuel Stafford, as: Psalmæ y brenhinol brophvvyd Dafydh: gwedi i cynghanedhu mewn mesurau cymreig. Middleton's psalms were the first full metrical Psalter in Welsh, and the only one in full cynghanedd.

Middleton's psalms remained at the British Museum, where they came to the attention of Walter Davies. Rev. Walter Davies (1761-1849) was a Welsh poet, editor, translator, antiquary and Anglican clergyman, born in Llanfechain, Montgomeryshire. He studied at Trinity College, Cambridge, where he received his M.A. in 1803. As a poet he used the bardic name of Gwallter Mechain. In 1807 he became vicar of Manafon, where he remained for 30 years and did most of his literary work. From there he wrote an introduction (Y Rhagymadrodd) to the Middleton psalms in January 1827, and explained about their poetry. He arranged for them to be published by Robert Jones in Llanfair Caereinion in Montgomeryshire in 1827. He reprinted them as Psalmau Dafydd: wedi eu cyfansoddi ar amrywiol fesurau cerdd, gan Y Cabden William Middleton. This was called the Second Edition (Ail Argraphiad).

=== Edward Kyffin metrical psalms, 1603 ===
Edward Kyffin was born in Oswestry in about 1558. He attended Jesus College, Cambridge, but it is thought that he did not graduate. He was ordained an Anglican deacon in London in 1585 and a priest in Bangor in 1590. He was a curate at St Martin Outwich in London. He died in 1603, probably in London from plague.

Whilst in London Kyffin enjoyed singing the psalms in the Church of England tradition. He wanted to translate the Welsh psalms into metre, so that they could be sung as the English metrical psalms were. It is believed that he versified around 50 of the psalms from William Morgan's Welsh translation, but only a handful have survived. The surviving psalms were collected by Thomas Salisbury. In 1603 he had them published in London by the printer Samuel Stafford, as: Rhann o Psalmae Dafydd Brophwyd - iuu canu ar ôl y dôn arferedig yn Eglwys Loegr. This includes 12 full psalms and the first 5 verses of Psalm 13. These are set in 4 line stanzas, set to the traditional Welsh poetic style known as awdl gywydd.

In his introduction Kyffin argues that his work was merely an experiment, to motivate others to do a better job. The metrical psalms were published side by side with the biblical psalms, with Kyffin's psalms in black letter Gothic type on the left and William Morgan's psalms in plain type on the right. The text included a preface to the reader (At y Darllenudd) from Edward Kyffin.

Kyffin's psalms were republished in 1930 by the University of Wales Press in Cardiff when it was entitled: Rhann o Psalmae Dafydd Brophwyd - I’w canu ar ol y don arferedig yn Eglwys Loegr.

=== Metrical psalms, 1621 ===
Salmau Cân (Metrical Psalms) is a translation of the 150 Psalms into free Welsh verse, suitable for congregational singing. It was the work of Edmund Prys (also spelt Edmwnd Prys) (1544-1623), a poet, rector of Ffestiniog and Archdeacon of Merioneth. They were printed in London and first published with the 1621 Book of Common Prayer. Edmund Prys is mentioned by William Morgan as one of three who helped him in the preparation of his translation of his 1588 Bible. Many of the Psalms are still sung in Welsh places of worship.

=== Morris Williams' metrical psalms, 1850 ===
Morris Williams (1809-1874) was a bard known as Nicander. He was ordained as an Anglican clergyman in 1836. He produced his own Metrical Psalms in 1850.

=== William Rees' psalms, 1875 ===
William Rees (1802-1883), known as Gwilym Hiraethog, was a poet and author. He rendered the William Morgan edition of the Psalms into verse titled Tŵr Dafydd in 1875.

=== Lewis Valentine's psalms, 1936 ===
Whilst he was Baptist pastor at Llandudno, Rev Lewis Valentine translated a selection of Psalms called Detholiad o'r Salmau, which was published by Gwasg Ilston in 1936.

=== New metrical psalms, 2008 ===
Salmau Cân Newydd (New Metrical Psalms) is a new metrical version of the Psalms, based on the 2004 Welsh translation of the Bible, but also having regard to the original Hebrew, by Gwynn ap Gwilym (1950-2016), an Anglican priest in the Church in Wales. A variety of metres are used and appropriate tunes suggested. It was published by Gwasg Gomer (Gomer Press) in 2008.

== Modern translations ==
=== Thomas Briscoe translation, 1853-1894 ===
Thomas Briscoe (1813-1895) translated Isaiah, Job, Psalms and Proverbs from Hebrew in Welsh, which were published between 1853 and 1855. His translation of the New Testament was published in 1894.

=== William Edwards New Testament, 1894-1915 ===
William Edwards (1848-1929), a Baptist College Principal, revised the William Morgan New Testament by reference to the Greek, which he called Cyfieithiad Newydd ("New Translation"). It was published in four volumes in 1894, 1898, 1913 and 1915.

=== Guild of Graduates New Testament, 1921-1948 ===
A project was started by the Theological Branch of the Guild of Graduates (alumni) of the University of Wales, to translate the Bible into modern Welsh. A team of 53 scholars worked on New Testament book by book, and the results were printed in portions between 1921 and 1948. Additionally Amos and Hosea from the Old Testament were published in 1924. It was never published as a whole.

=== Islwyn Ffowc Elis, 1961 ===
The Welsh author and one time Calvinist Methodist minister, Rev Islwyn Ffowc Elis translated the Gospel of Matthew into modern Welsh, which was published in Caernarfon in 1961. It was called Efengyl Mathew and subtitled Trosiad i gymraeg diweddar.

=== Y Ffordd Newydd, 1971 ===
In 1969 the Bible Society produced a Gospel of John in Popular Welsh called Y Ffordd. This was followed by the translation of all 4 Gospels in 1971 as Y Ffordd Newydd. The publications included illustrations by Annie Vallotton and it was done in the style of the English Good News Bible.

=== New Welsh Bible, 1988 ===
A new translation, Y Beibl Cymraeg Newydd (BCN), was published in 1988 (including the revised New Testament published in 1975 and the Psalms in 1979) and has largely replaced the William Morgan translation, although its publishers stated that it was not intended to supplant Morgan's translation, but merely as an alternative. It also included the Apocrypha. Professor John Tudno Williams and Professor S.I. Enoch were members of the New Testament Panel.

=== Duw ar waith, 1990 ===
In 1990, a translation of the Gospel of Mark (Y Newyddion da yn ôl Marc) for use in schools was adapted from the New Welsh Bible by Edwin C. Lewis.

=== Revised New Welsh Bible, 2004 ===
A revision, Y Beibl Cymraeg Newydd Diwygiedig (BCND) (the Revised New Welsh Bible), was released in March 2004, and the Apocrypha (called Yr Apocryffa) was printed in 2008. Staff reporter (11 March 2004). "New Welsh-language Bible - from Korea". Walesonline. Archived from the original on 23 September 2016.

In 2005 an audio version of the BCND was produced by the Bible Society called "Y Llais". The parts of Jesus Christ and Paul are played by two well-known professional actors - Richard Elfyn and Rhys Parry Jones - and other prominent Welsh voices also feature, including Lisabeth Miles.

=== beibl.net, 2015, 2021 ===
beibl.net is a new translation of the Bible into simple colloquial Welsh by Gobaith i Gymru. The New Testament was published online in 2002 and the entire Bible was published online in 2013 and in print in 2015. This was updated in 2021. Some of it is also available in audio.

=== New World Translation, 2022 ===
On 25 June 2022 the New World Translation of the Christian Greek Scriptures in Welsh was released in digital form by the Jehovah's Witnesses, with a printed edition to follow in December 2022.

== Language comparison ==
A Comparison of John 3:16 in Welsh Translations
Translation	
Testament Newydd William Salesbury, 1567	Canys velly y carodd Duw y byt, yny rhoddes ef ei vnig-enit vap, y'n y vydei i bop vn a greda ynthaw, na choller, amyn caffael bywyt tragyvythawl.
Beibl William Morgan, 1588	Canys felly y cârodd Duw y bŷd, fel y rhoddodd efe ei uni-genedic fab, fel na choller nêb a'r y fydd yn crêdu ynddo ef, eithr caffael o honaw ef fywyd tragywyddol.
Beibl William Morgan, 1620	Canys felly y carodd Duw y byd fel y rhoddodd efe ei unig-anedig Fab, fel na choller pwy bynnag a gredo ynddo ef, ond caffael ohono fywyd tragwyddol.
Y Beibl Cymraeg Newydd, 1988	Do, carodd Duw y byd gymaint nes iddo roi ei unig Fab, er mwyn i bob un sy'n credu ynddo ef beidio â mynd i ddistryw ond cael bywyd tragwyddol.
beibl.net by Arfon Jones, 2008	Ydy, mae Duw wedi caru’r byd cymaint nes iddo roi ei unig Fab, er mwyn i bwy bynnag sy'n credu ynddo beidio mynd i ddistryw ond cael bywyd tragwyddol.

== See also ==
- Mary Jones and her Bible
- Y Beibl cyssegr-lan
