= Richard Mackenzie Williams =

Welsh Anglican priest

Richard Mackenzie Williams (2 February 1882 – 12 December 1966) was a Welsh Anglican priest in the mid 20th century who rose to become Archdeacon of Wrexham.

Williams was educated at Jesus College, Oxford. He was ordained deacon in 1912; and priest in 1913. After a curacies in Gwersyllt and Wrexham he held incumbencies at Caego and Mold. He was also Cursal Canon of St Asaph Cathedral from 1942 until his retirement in 1957.

Church in Wales titles
Preceded by James Williams	Archdeacon of Wrexham; 1948–1957	Succeeded by Benjamin Jones-Perrott
