= Edmund Prys =

Welsh poet

Edmund (Edmwnd) Prys (1542/3 – 1623) was a Welsh clergyman and poet, best known for Welsh metrical translations of the Psalms in his Salmau Cân.

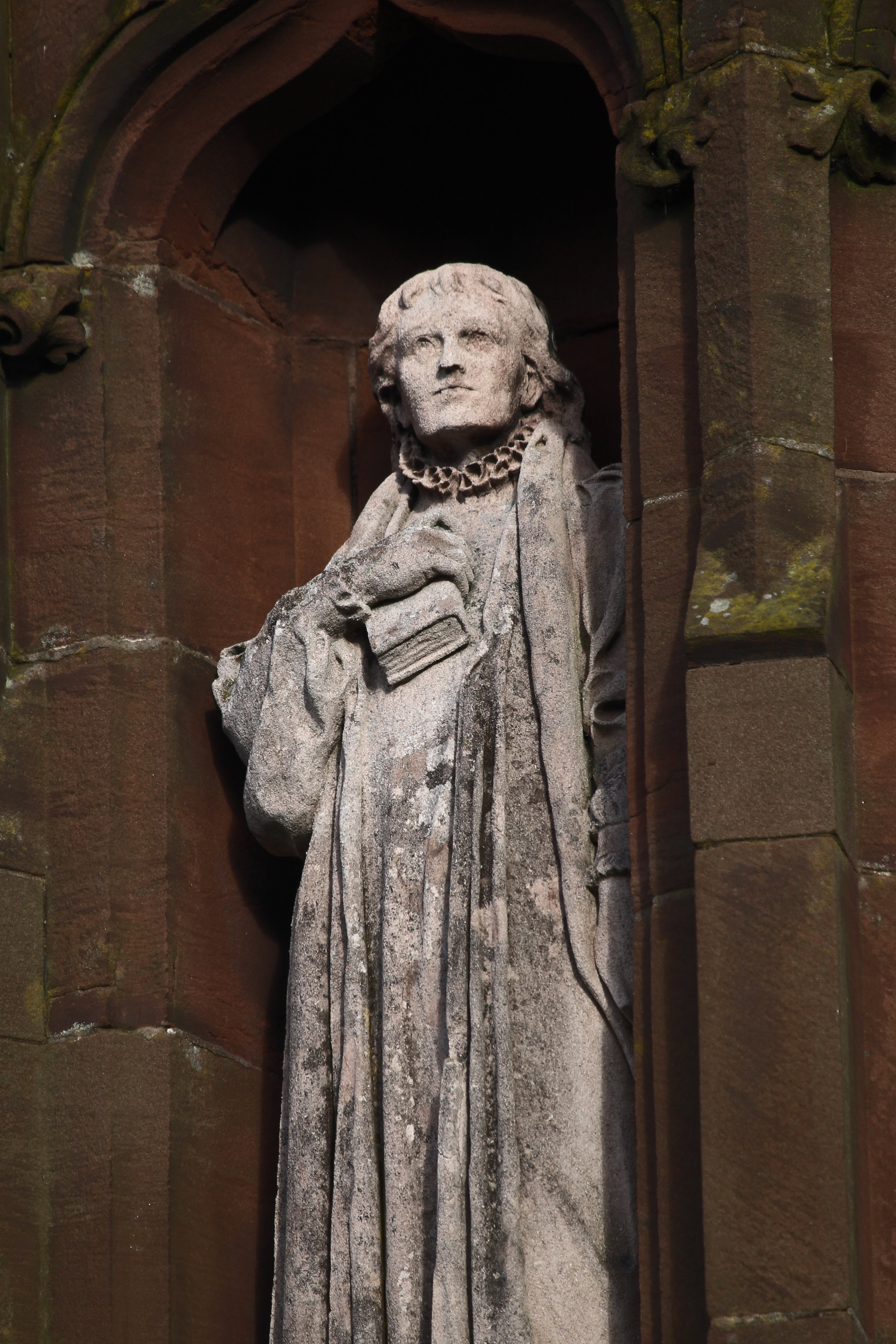
Edmund Prys was a Welsh clergyman and poet.

== Life ==
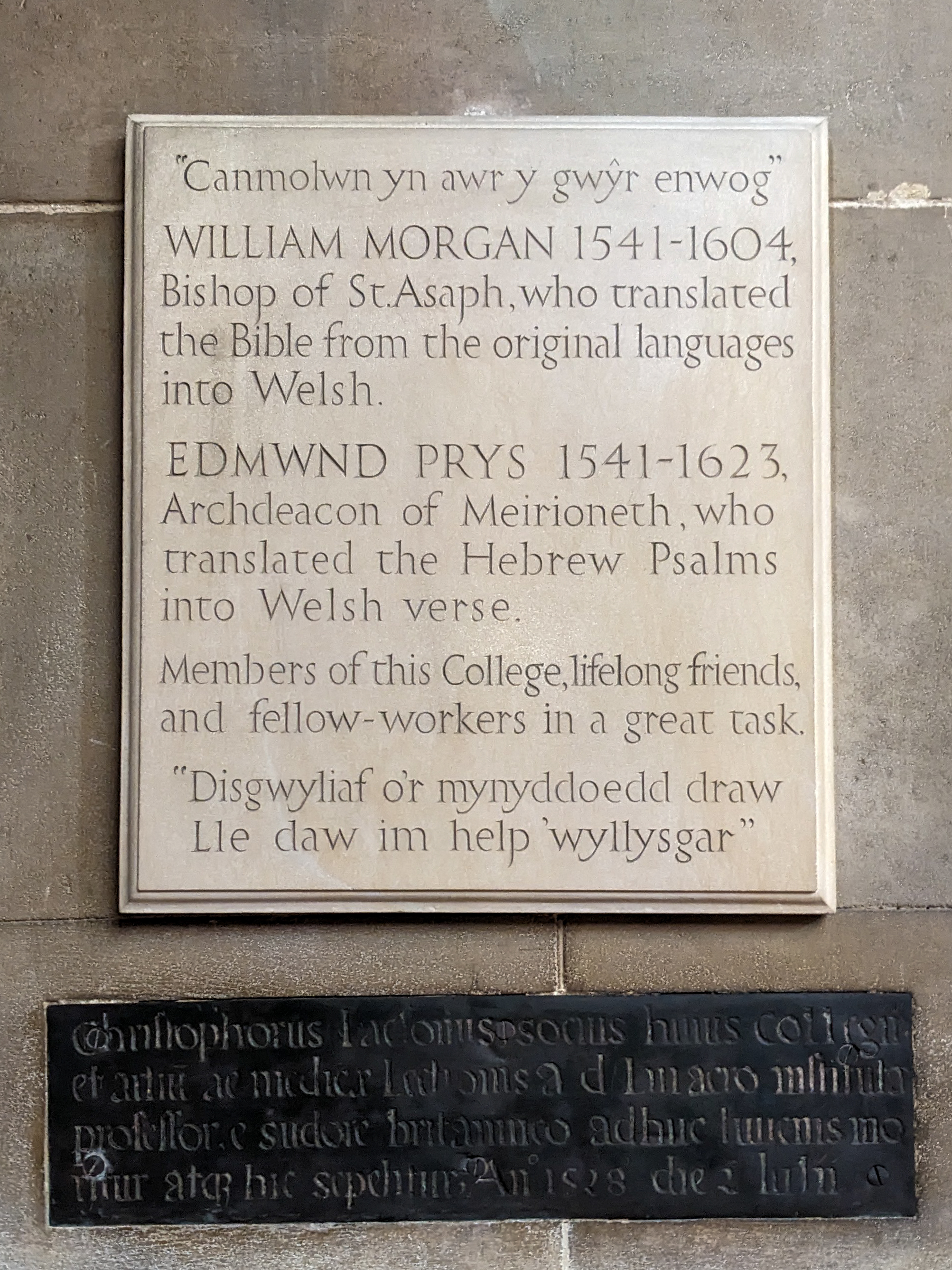
Memorial to William Morgan and Edmwnd Prys, St John's College Chapel, Cambridge

Prys was born in Llanrwst, then Denbighshire but now Conwy, in 1542 or 1543, son of Siôn ap Rhys ap Gruffudd ap Rhys and Siân, daughter of Owain ap Llywelyn ab Ieuan. He was a kinsman of the scholar and bible translator William Salesbury who may have been an early influence. On 16 March 1565 he entered St. John's College, Cambridge, where he was a contemporary of William Morgan, the bible translator. He graduated B.A. in 1568, in M.A. 1571, and was a Fellow in 1570.

On 14 March 1573 he became rector of Festiniog, with its chapelry of Maentwrog. He became Rector of Ludlow in March 1576 and on 5 November 1576 archdeacon of Merioneth. On 16 April 1580 there was added to the livings he already held the rectory of Llanenddwyn with its chapelry of Llanddwywe, and on 8 October 1602 he was made a canon cursal (a subsidiary canon) of St Asaph Cathedral.

He was twice married: first, to Elin, daughter of John ap Lewis of Pengwern, Ffestiniog, by whom he had two sons, John and Robert, and a daughter Jane; secondly, to Gwen, daughter of Morgan ap Lewis of Fronheulog (his first wife's cousin), by whom he had three sons, Ffoulk (Ffowc), Morgan and Edmund.

He died in 1623, and was buried in Maentwrog church. There is a memorial to William Morgan and Edmwnd Prys in St John's College Chapel, Cambridge, where they were students. A primary school in the village of Gellilydan is named after him.

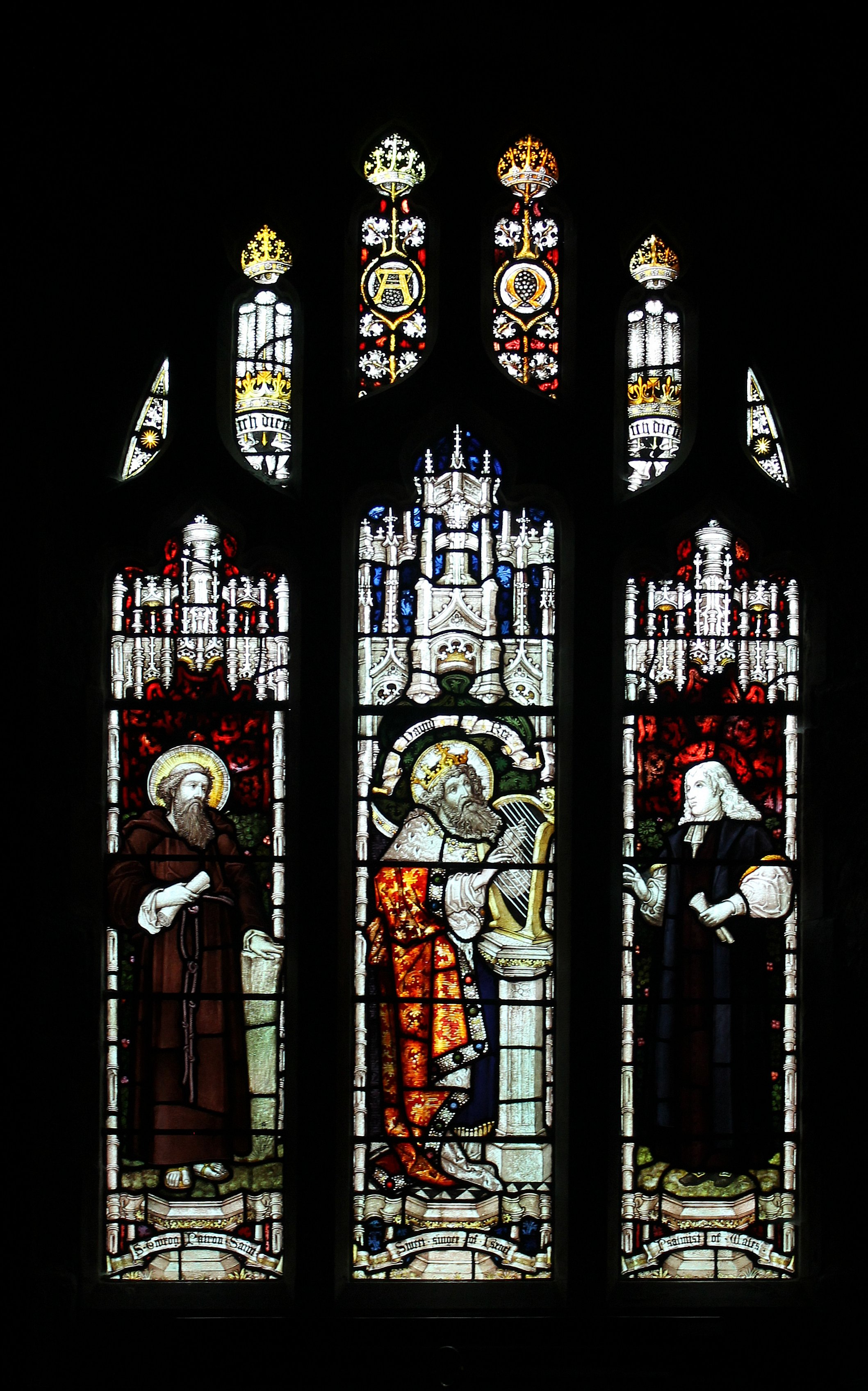
Memorial window in St Twrog's Church, Maentwrog. Prys is pictured on the right, with the caption Psalmist of Wales

== Works ==
Prys composed in the strict Welsh metres, and took an active part in the bardic life of his time. He engaged in duels of satiric verse, crossing swords with his neighbours, Thomas Price (fl. 1586–1632), Siôn Phylip, and William Cynwal of Ysbyty Ifan. The last encounter is known for its length (fifty-four poems in total), and the fact that the archdeacon's adversary died while it was proceeding: in view of Prys's advocacy of Renaissance literary fashions it is regarded as a key text of Welsh Renaissance literature. But Prys's reputation rests on his translation of the psalms into free Welsh verse, suitable for congregational singing. At least nineteen editions of the Salmau Cân appeared, chiefly in editions of the Bible. A rendering of the psalms into the strict metres by Captain William Midleton had been issued in 1603, and a freer translation of thirteen by Edward Kyffin had appeared in the same year. In 1621, however, to a new issue of the Welsh version of the Book of Common Prayer was appended Prys's translation of the whole of the psalter. He rejected the bardic metres in order to adapt his work for popular use. His version of Psalm 23 was translated into English, becoming the very popular hymn "The King of Love My Shepherd Is".

Prys is mentioned by Dr William Morgan as one of three who rendered him assistance in the preparation of his translation of the Bible (1588). Dr John Davies (Mallwyd) addressed the preface to his grammar Antiquae Linguae Britannicae... (1621) to him.

== Appearances ==
Louis L'amour's Novel : To the far blue mountains (The Sacketts n.2) Chapter 9. (Edmund Price)
