= James Williams (archdeacon of Wrexham) =

Welsh Anglican priest

James Evan Williams was a Welsh Anglican priest in the first half the 20th century who rose to become Archdeacon of Wrexham.

Williams was educated at Christ's College, Cambridge. He was ordained Deacon in 1891; and Priest in 1892. After a curacy in Bangor he held incumbencies in Bontddu, Portmadoc, Wrexham and Gresford. He was also Treasurer of St Asaph Cathedral from 1930 until his death on 12 February 1953.

Church in Wales titles
Preceded by Lewis Pryce	Archdeacon of Wrexham; 1930 – 1947	Succeeded by Richard Mackenzie Williams
