= Bryan Williams (priest) =

British Anglican priest

Raymond Samuel Foster (1936-2005) was a Welsh Anglican priest in the second half of the 20th century and the first decades of the 21st.

Williams was educated at St David's College, Lampeter. He was ordained Deacon in 1960; and Priest in 1961. After a curacy in Rhyl he held incumbencies at Dyserth, Denbigh and Bwlchgwyn. He was Archdeacon of Wrexham from 1987 to 2001.

Church in Wales titles
| Preceded by Raymond Foster | Archdeacon of Wrexham; 1987 – 2001 | Succeeded by Malcolm Squires |
