= Henry Bynneman =

English printer (died 1583)

- Died: 1583
- Occupation: printer of the 16th century

Henry Bynneman (died 1583), was an English printer of the 16th century.

== Career ==
His career as a printer lasted from 1566, when he became free of the Stationers' Company, until his death in 1583. He had been apprenticed to Richard Harrison in 1560, but that printer died about January 1563; though definitive evidence is lacking, Bynneman likely served the remainder of his apprenticeship with Reyner Wolfe. He became one of that select group of printers to whom the Archbishop of Canterbury, Matthew Parker, extended his patronage.

Through the good offices of Leicester and Sir Christopher Hatton, in 1580 Bynneman obtained a privilege to print "all dictionaries in all tongues, all chronicles and histories whatsoever." He had previously printed and published with privileges for "bookes" [i.e. proclamations] dealing with the lottery as well as a variety of works seemingly secured after Matthew Parker wrote to William Cecil in 1569 on his behalf. Though he is known for printing Holinshed's Chronicles for a group of wealthy stationers in 1577, he did not so under his royal patent, which he did not yet have. In addition to printing works by noted authors such as Edmund Spenser, Gabriel Harvey, George Turberville, and others, Bynneman printed the first Welsh New Testament translated directly from Greek in 1567 for publisher Humphrey Toy, along with the first Welsh edition of the Book of Common Prayer.

Bynneman had three presses by 1583, and, as the inventory of his property shows, had a varied stock of type, including Greek and Hebrew. He was the first printer in England to use a script of the kind known as civilité or "secretary."

Bynneman died in 1583, leaving a widow and several children, one of whom, Christopher, was in 1600 apprenticed to Thomas Dawson. Upon his death his stock of books was handed over to London Armourer Richard Hutton, because Bynneman had, by 1581, defaulted on a loan of £1,000 given to him by Hutton. The Eliot's Court Press purchased some of his type and his decorative blocks and initials.
