= Benjamin Jones-Perrott =

Welsh Anglican priest

Benjamin Peredur Jones-Perrott (4 August 1894 – 16 July 1973) was a Welsh Anglican priest in the 20th century who rose to become Archdeacon of Wrexham and afterwards Archdeacon Emeritus.

Jones-Perrott was educated at St David's College, Lampeter. He was ordained Deacon in 1916; and Priest in 1917. After a curacy in Chirk he held incumbencies at Bwlch-y-cibau and Ruabon. He was also Cursal Canon of St Asaph Cathedral from 1954 until 1957.

Church in Wales titles
Preceded by Richard Mackenzie Williams	Archdeacon of Wrexham; 1957 – 1969	Succeeded by John Davies
