= John Davies (archdeacon of Wrexham) =

Welsh Anglican priest (1908–1991)

John Edward Davies (1908–1991) was a Welsh Anglican priest in the second half of the 20th century who rose to become Archdeacon of Wrexham.

Davies was educated at the University of Wales. He was ordained Deacon in 1935; and Priest in 1936. After curacies in Wrexham and Abergele he was Vicar choral of St Asaph Cathedral from 1942 until 1944. After that he held incumbencies at Llanasa and Mold; and was Cursal Canon at St Asaph from 1965 to 1969.

Church in Wales titles
Preceded by Benjamin Jones-Perrott	Archdeacon of Wrexham; 1969 – 1978	Succeeded by Raymond Foster
