= Shirley Griffiths (priest) =

Church in Wales priest

Shirley Thelma Griffiths (born March 1948) is a Church in Wales priest: most notably Archdeacon of Wrexham from 2010 to 2013.

She was educated at Bangor University and ordained in 1995. After a curacy in East Cowton she was the Vicar of Abergele.

Church in Wales titles
| Preceded by Malcolm Squires | Archdeacon of Wrexham; 2010–2013 | Succeeded by Bob Griffiths |
