= Malcolm Squires =

Church in Wales priest

Malcolm Squires (b 1946) is a Church in Wales priest: most notably Archdeacon of Wrexham from 2001 to 2010.

Squires was educated at St Chad's College, Durham and ordained in 1975. After a curacies in Headingley and Stanningley he was the Vicar of Bradshaw from 1980 to 1985. He was at Mirfield from 1985 to 1996; and at Wrexham from then until his retirement.

Church in Wales titles
Preceded by Raymond Foster	Archdeacon of Wrexham; 2001–2010	Succeeded by Shirley Griffiths
