= Humphrey Toy =

Humphrey Toy (1537 – 16 October 1577) was an English bookseller and publisher, and the son of bookseller Robert Toy. In 1567, he published the first translation of New Testament in Welsh from the original Greek, translated by his close friend William Salesbury. Along with the Bible, Toy published the first translation of the Book of Common Prayer in Welsh, also translated by Salesbury.

== Early life ==
Toy was born around 1537, the son of Robert Toy, a bookseller, and his wife who died in 1546. The Toy family was of Welsh origin. In 1551, Toy entered Queens' College, Cambridge as a sizar, but he left Cambridge before earning a degree. After Robert Toy died in 1556, most of his property passed to Toy's stepmother Elizabeth Toy with the provision that it would pass to Humphrey after her death. Until her death around 1558, Toy assisted his stepmother in running his father's shop and publishing interests. At some point during this period, Toy married Margaret Revell.

== Publishing career ==
Toy entered work with the Stationer's Company in August 1560, and served as the company's renter warden from 1561 to 1563. Toy later rose through the ranks of the company, and served twice as its underwarden in 1571 and 1573. While working at the Stationer's Company, Toy took control of the bookshop that he inherited from his father and stepmother. Toy's shop was known as the Helmet, because of the helmet depicted on its sign, and Toy was granted a seventy-year lease on the location of the shop.

While at the Stationer's Company, Toy became an active printer and publisher, and became particularly interested in religious works. He worked closely with Christopher Plantin of Antwerp, who helped Toy acquire a large collection of European protestant works. Toy also entered into a dispute, along with three other printers, with Richard Jugge, over the right to print Bibles in English.

=== Work with William Salesbury ===
Possibly because of his Welsh background, Toy formed a friendship with the Welsh scholar William Salesbury, and worked with him professionally on several occasions. In 1567, Toy financed and published Salesbury's translation of New Testament in Welsh, the first translation made into Welsh from the original Greek. That same year, Toy financed and published Salesbury's translation of the Book of Common Prayer into Welsh, the first such translation.

Both the Bible and the Book of Common Prayer were printed by Henry Bynneman, with financing and oversight from Toy. Toy was recognized on the first page of Book of Common Prayer for providing "the costes and charges" of the publication.

After the Book of Common Prayer and New Testament, Toy also published a guide to Welsh pronunciation, and several smaller works for Salesbury.

== Death ==
Toy died on 16 October 1577 and was buried at All Saints' Church, Bristol. After his death, his widow Margaret and his apprentice Thomas Chard took control of his estate, and continued his work in both publishing and bookselling. Chard operated the Helmet until 1585, and it subsequently changed hands several times before disappearing in 1607.

Approximately thirty works printed by Toy are still in existence; among these, an edition of Richard Grafton's Chronicle that he printed is the most notable.
