= Lewis Pryce =

Welsh Anglican priest

Lewis Hugh Oswald Pryce (1 August 1873 – 30 September 1930) was a Welsh Anglican priest in the first third of the 20th century who rose to become Archdeacon of Wrexham.

The son of Shadrach Pryce, Dean of St Asaph from 1899 to 1910, he was educated at Clifton College and Pembroke College, Cambridge. He was ordained Deacon in 1896; and Priest in 1897. After curacies in Lampeter and Brecon he held incumbencies in Wrexham and Bistre. He was Warden of Ruthin from 1909 to 1916; Vicar of Colwyn Bay from 1916 to 1923; and Rural Dean of Wrexham from 1923 until his appointment as Archdeacon.

Church in Wales titles
Preceded by William Fletcher	Archdeacon of Wrexham; 1925–1930	Succeeded by James Williams
