= Raymond Foster =

British Anglican priest

Raymond Samuel Foster (1920–1987) was born in Bulwell, Nottinghamshire, in 1920. He became an Anglican priest in the 20th century who rose to become Archdeacon of Wrexham.

Raymond was educated at King's College London (Bachelor of Divinity 1941). He was ordained Deacon in 1943; and Priest in 1944. After curacies in Old Basford and Newark he held the incumbencies of Elston with Elston Chapel, and Sibthorpe from 1947 until 1952. During the same period he was also a Lecturer at Lincoln Theological College and at the University of Nottingham where his subjects were Hebrew and Old Testament. He received a PhD degree from the University of Nottingham in 1952. From 1952 until 1956 he was Chaplain at Alleyn's School, Dulwich, London, and Senior Inspector of Schools for the Diocese of Southwark. From 1956 to 1961 he was Chaplain and Lecturer at Fourah Bay College, Freetown, Sierra Leone, and Examining Chaplain to the Archbishop of West Africa from 1957 to 1961. In 1961 he was appointed Vicar of Whittlebury with Silverstone, Northamptonshire, and Examining Chaplain and Director of Ordinand Training for the Diocese of Peterborough. In 1962 he was appointed Warden of St John's College, Auckland, New Zealand. In New Zealand he was also a Commissioner for the Diocese of Polynesia from 1962 and was appointed an Honorary Cannon of Auckland Cathedral in 1963. In 1964 he was the founding editor of The Australian and New Zealand Theological Review (later Collequium). In 1967 he was awarded a Doctorate of Theology (ThD) by the Australian College of Theology. In 1968–69, on sabbatical, he was Priest in Charge of Stanford on Soar, Ratcliffe on Soar and West Leake with Kingston on Soar in Nottinghamshire. In 1972 he was appointed Secretary for Home Mission and Research for the SPCK, and then, from 1973 until 1977, Warden of St Deiniol's Library, Hawarden, Clwyd, Wales. He was appointed Rector of Wrexham and a Prebend of St Asaph's Cathedral in 1977. In January 1978 he was appointed a Preceptor of St Asaph's Cathedral and in September that year he was also appointed as Archdeacon of Wrexham. He retired as Rector of Wrexham in 1984 but remained Archdeacon of Wrexham until his death in 1987

== Publications ==
- 1956 Christ's Chapel of Allyen's College of God's Gift: a short history. London. College Publications.
- 1961 The Sierra Leone Church: an independent Anglican church. London, S.P.C.K,
- 1970 The Restoration of Israel: a study in Exile and Return. London, Darton, Longman & Todd Ltd.
- 1986 God’s Address to his Church. The Sunday Readings. Church in Wales Publications.
- 1987 Called to be Saints! Readings for Holy Days. Church in Wales Publications.
- 1987 These are the Words... A Study in Deuteronomy. Auckland, New Zealand, College Communications.

Church in Wales titles
Preceded by John Davies	Archdeacon of Wrexham; 1978 – 1987	Succeeded by Bryan Williams
