= William Morgan (Bible translator) =

Welsh bishop and theologian (c.1545–1604)

The Right Reverend William Morgan
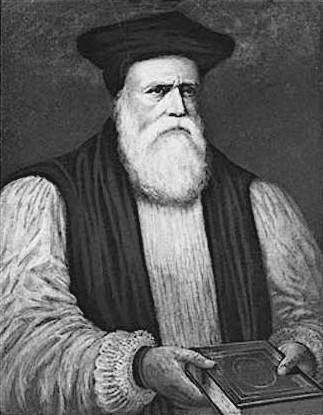
- Imagined portrait by T. Prytherch (1907)
- Born: 1545; Penmachno, Caernarfonshire, Wales
- Died: 10 September 1604 (aged 58–59); St Asaph, Flintshire, Wales
- Occupations: First translator of whole Bible into Welsh; Bishop of Llandaff and St Asaph

William Morgan (c. 1545 – 10 September 1604) was a Welsh Bishop of Llandaff and of St Asaph, and the translator of Y Beibl cyssegr-lan, the first version of the whole Bible into Welsh, from Greek and Hebrew. Along with William Salesbury, he was among the most influential writers in creating what became the standard of literary Welsh in the modern era.

== Life ==
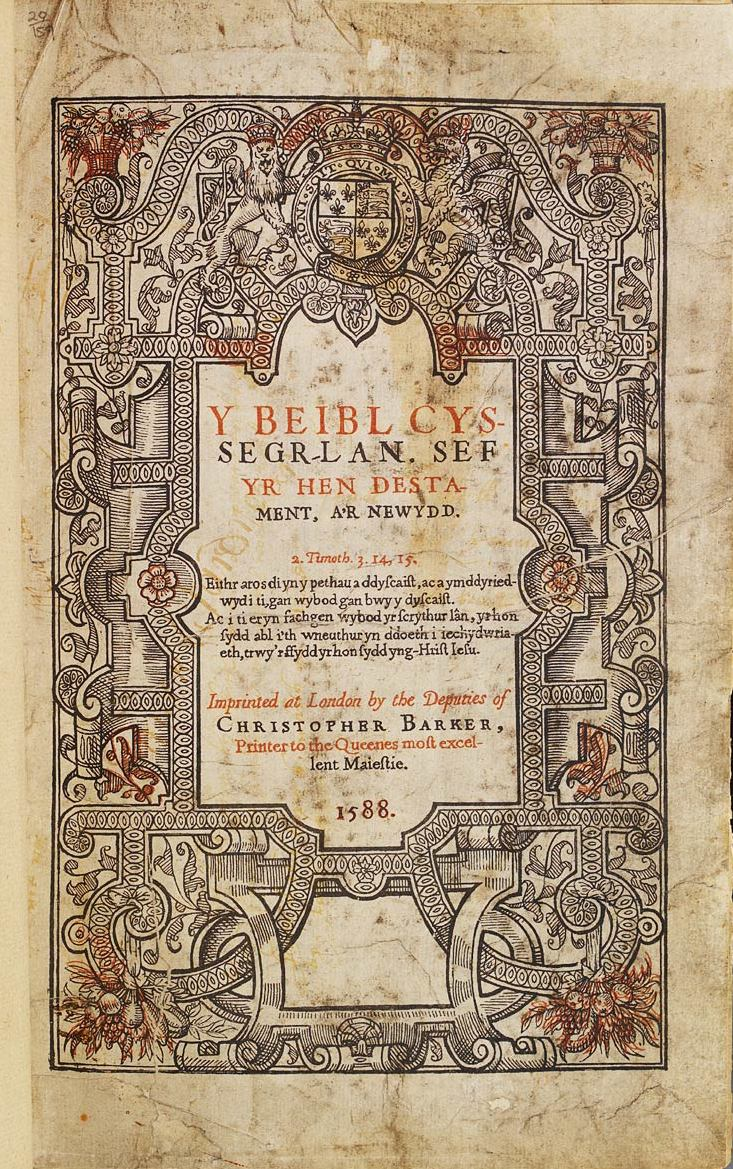
Title page of Morgan's translation of the Bible

Morgan was born in 1545 at Tŷ Mawr Wybrnant, in the parish of Penmachno, near Betws-y-Coed, north Wales (there is some doubt about the exact year of his birth; his memorial in Cambridge, for example, gives 1541). (Note: He was the son of John Morgan and his wife, Lowry. Morgan was one of five children and the youngest child in his family.) As his father was a tenant of the Gwydir estate, he was probably educated at Gwydir Castle, near Llanrwst, along with the children of the Wynn family. Morgan then attended St John's College, Cambridge, where he studied a range of subjects including philosophy, mathematics and Greek. He graduated BA in 1568 and MA in 1571, before seven years of Biblical studies, including a study of the Bible in Greek, Hebrew and Aramaic and the works of the Church Fathers and contemporary Protestant theologians. He graduated BD in 1578 and DD in 1583. At Cambridge he was a contemporary of the Welsh clergyman and poet Edmwnd Prys who had been born only 12 miles from Morgan's birthplace; Prys later assisted Morgan with his translation of the Bible.

In addition to his scholarly pursuits, Morgan was a clergyman of the Church of England, having been ordained in 1568 by the Bishop of Ely. His first clerical benefice was the parish of Llanbadarn Fawr, which he gained in 1572; in 1575 he moved to Welshpool, and then became vicar of Llanrhaeadr-ym-Mochnant in 1578. It was likely around 1578–1579 that he began his Bible translation into Welsh. In 1579 he became rector of Llanfyllin, which he held concurrently with being vicar of nearby Llanrhaeadr-ym-Mochnant.

Morgan was still at Cambridge when William Salesbury published his Welsh New Testament in 1567. While he was pleased that this work was available, Morgan firmly believed in the importance of having the Old Testament translated into Welsh as well. He began work on his own translation of the Old Testament in the early 1580s and published this, together with a revision of Salesbury's New Testament, in 1588.

Following the publication of his Bible, Morgan worked on a revision of the Book of Common Prayer (which had also been translated by Salesbury), published in 1599. He also began work on a revision of the 1588 Bible, which contained a number of printing errors. Unfortunately, the latest version of Morgan's New Testament was lost in the chaos of the 1603 London plague, which disrupted the operations of publisher Thomas Salisbury. This work was continued after Morgan's death by bishop Richard Parry and scholar John Davies, and a revised version of the Bible was published in 1620.

William Morgan was appointed Bishop of Llandaff in 1595 and was translated to the bishopric of St Asaph in 1601. He died on 10 September 1604. On his death, it was found he was living in debt, and his estate did not have enough to pay off his creditors, with him most likely having spent his money on printings of his Bible.

== Family ==
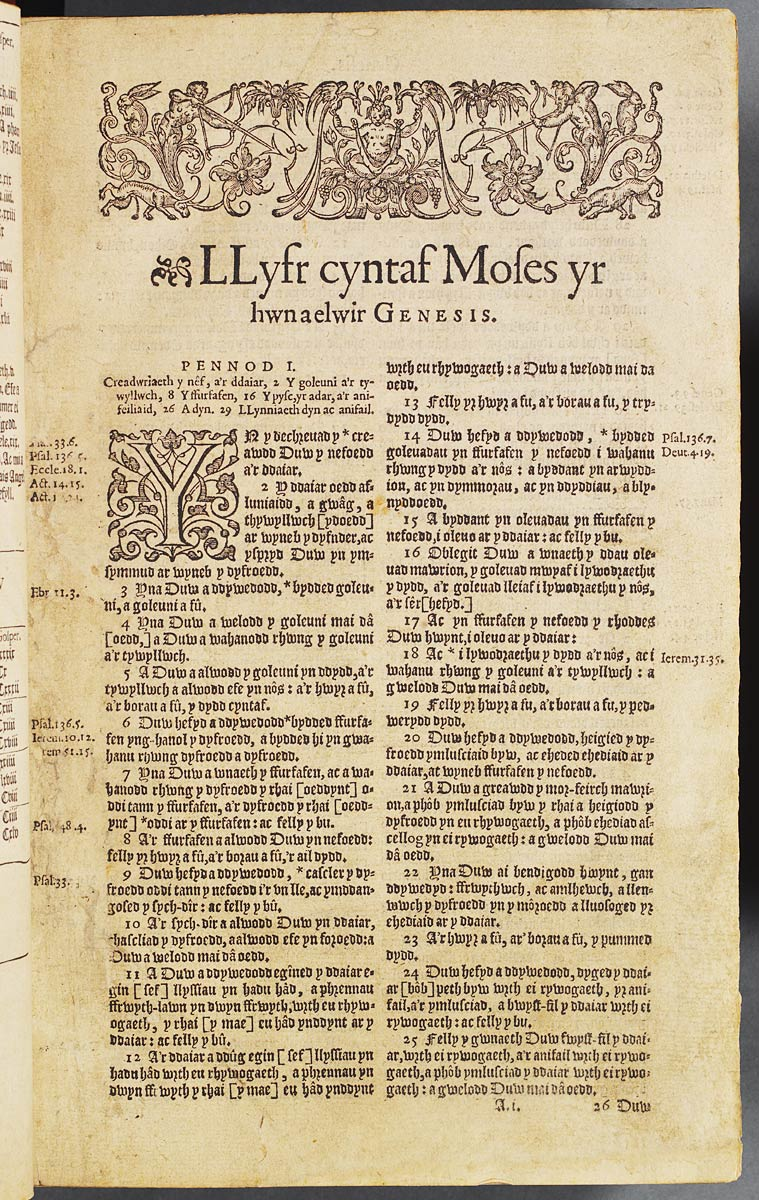
The opening page of the Book of Genesis in Morgan's Bible

He married twice, first to Ellen Salesbury, before going to Cambridge, and later to Catherine, daughter of George ap Richard ap John. He had one son, Evan, who became vicar of his father's old parish of Llanrhaeadr-ym-Mochnant.

== Influence ==
Morgan's Bible translation was very influential in standardizing what form printed Welsh would take, as well as preserving Welsh as an independent language with a sufficiently viable population speaking and writing in it. The 1620 Bible was still known as William Morgan's translation as the changes were not overly significant from his 1588 work, and it became the standard Welsh Bible until 1988. It continues to be used to this day. Issac Thomas wrote it "stands on par with Luther's German version and with the English Authorized Version." Glanmor Williams called it an "incomparable triumph."

As background, the Parliament during the Elizabethan era had the twin goals of standardizing English, and of making the Church of England accessible in vernacular languages. In much of England and lower Scotland, these goals coincided by making the weekly liturgy many Britons heard come from Bibles and a Book of Common Prayer in a standardized, London version of English. However, in Wales, English was roughly as comprehensible as Latin. Parliament elected to encourage and sponsor a translation of the Bible and associated liturgy books into Welsh by an act in 1563, essentially prioritizing liturgical goals over linguistic unity, and attempting to avoid any claims that Protestantism was an alien faith imposed from without upon Wales. William Salesbury's 1567 translation of the New Testament was an influential first step. Morgan translated the Old Testament for the first time into Welsh. Morgan also made several key changes to Salesbury's New Testament transaction, although still acknowledged Salesbury's crucial role. Salesbury had a somewhat eccentric orthography, and intentionally modified spellings and synonyms, perhaps in an attempt to show the range of the Welsh language. Salesbury's work also attempted to hew to some Latinate ties, putting in Latin-inflected spellings even when the Welsh pronunciation did not include these. Morgan largely discarded these Latinisms, and favoured phonetic spellings close to their pronunciation. He also opted for a smaller number of distinct words when translating, opting for consistency over variety. All of this made for an easier Bible to read and understand in Welsh churches than the original Salesbury edition; even illiterate Welsh could still hear the words of Morgan's version every Sunday.

In the centuries that followed, Welsh government and trade trended toward use of the English language. It was in religion where the Welsh language was secure, approved by Act of Parliament, and provided a base of usage and standardization. Isaac Thomas wrote that "without the Welsh Bible the Welsh language would have gradually but surely have disappeared." Glanmor Williams wrote that Morgan's Welsh Bible was "the standard and model for the work of all the subsequent authors who wrote in Welsh."

== Memorials and commemorations ==
Morgan's birthplace Tŷ Mawr Wybrnant is preserved by the National Trust as a historic house museum. A slate plaque close to the gates of the parish church of St Dogfan in Llanrhaeadr-ym-Mochnant commemorates Morgan. It was while at this church that he made his historic translations. There is a memorial in St John's College Chapel, Cambridge, where Morgan was a student. In 2019 it was announced that the new office building for the UK Government in Central Square, Cardiff, was to be named Tŷ William Morgan ("William Morgan House"), in Morgan's honour. In June 2025, a copy of Morgan’s bible is to go on display for the first time. Printed in London in 1588 and presented by him to the Westminster Abbey library, it is to be shown at St Davids Cathedral.

== Gallery ==
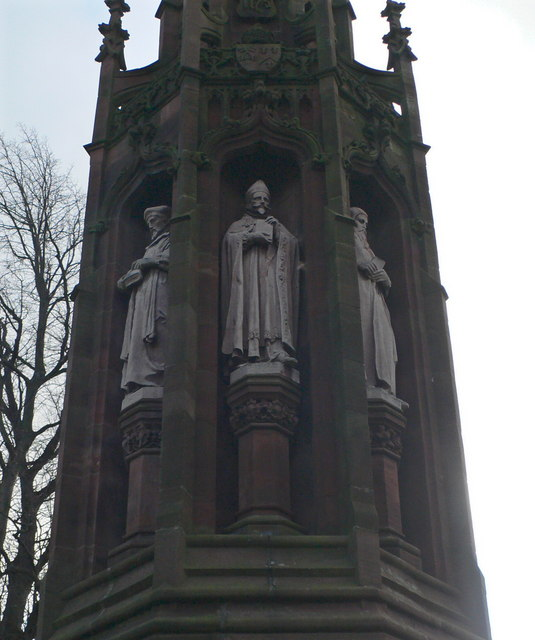
Translators' Memorial, St Asaph

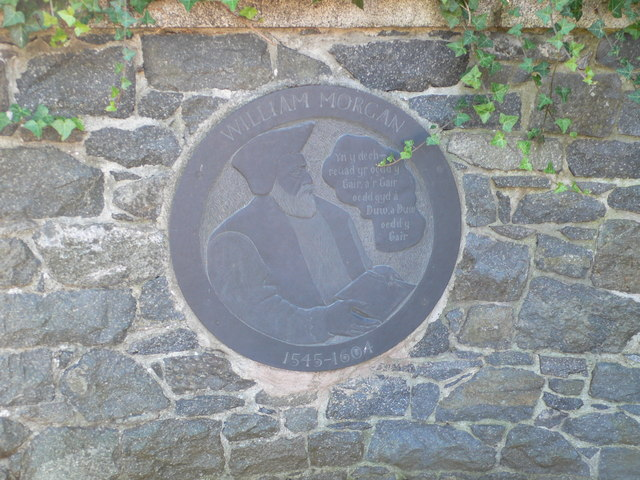
St Dogfan, Llanrhaeadr-ym-Mochnant

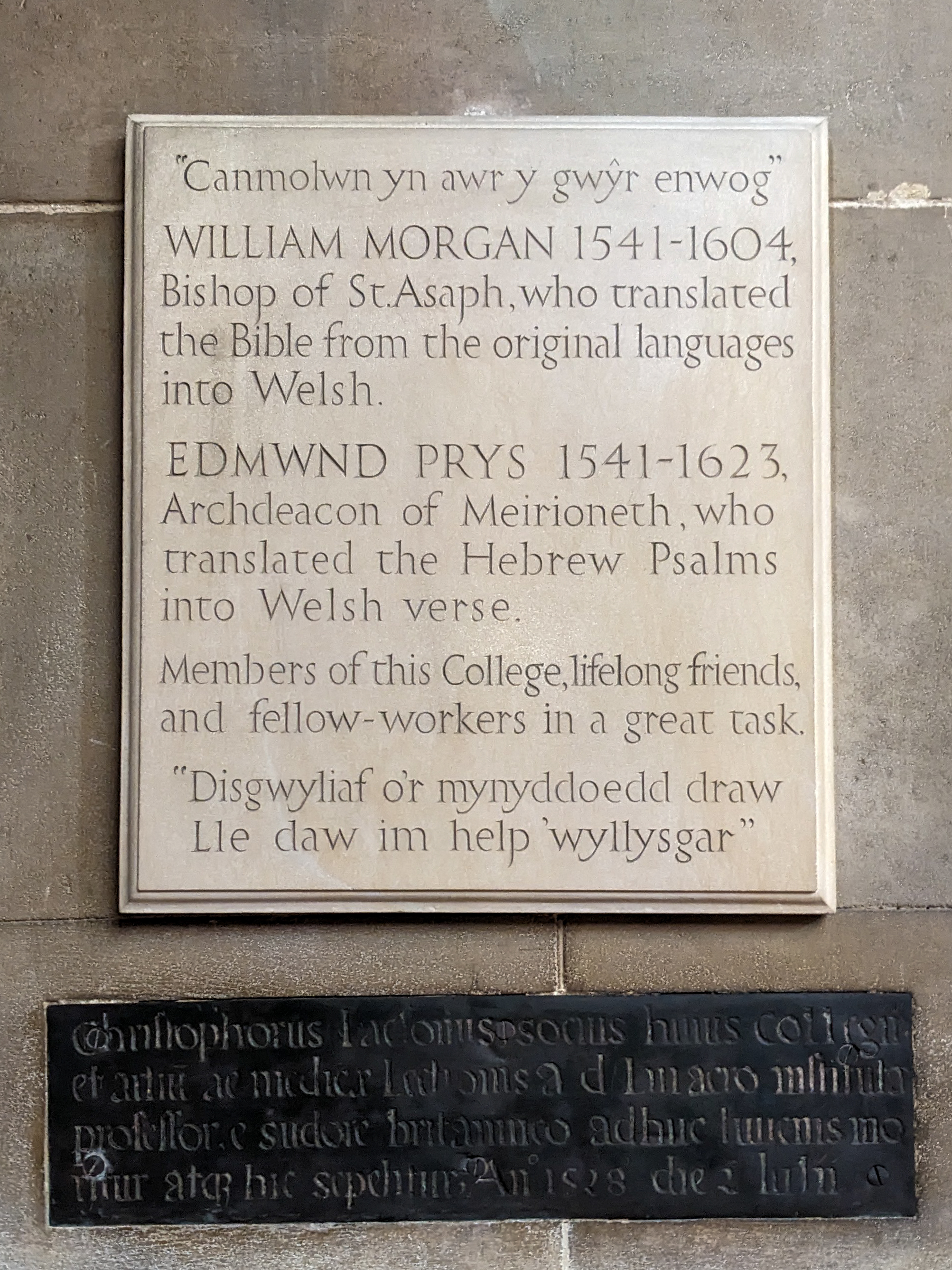
William Morgan and Edmund Prys memorial, St John's College Chapel, Cambridge

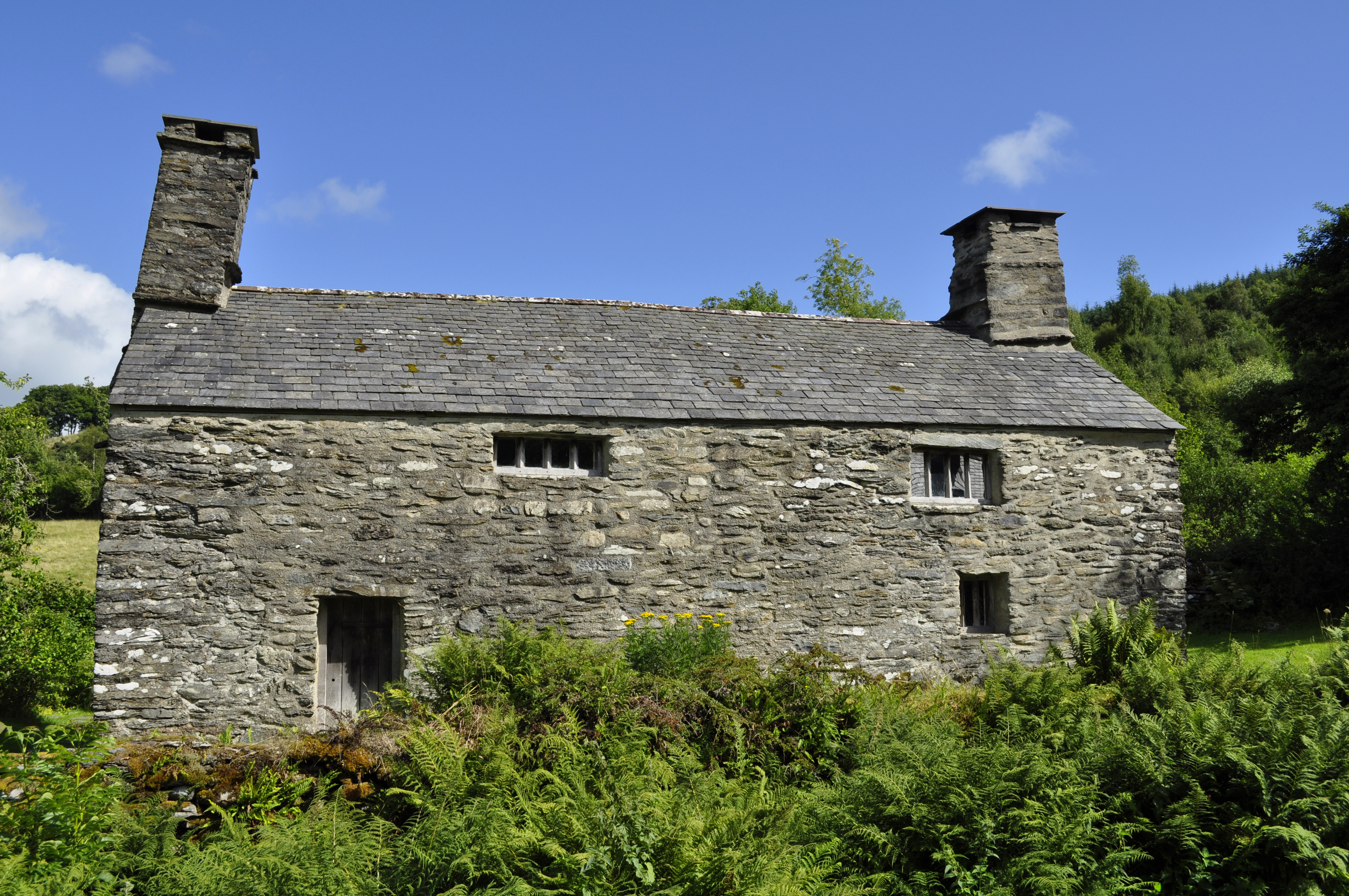
Tŷ Mawr Wybrnant, Morgan's birthplace

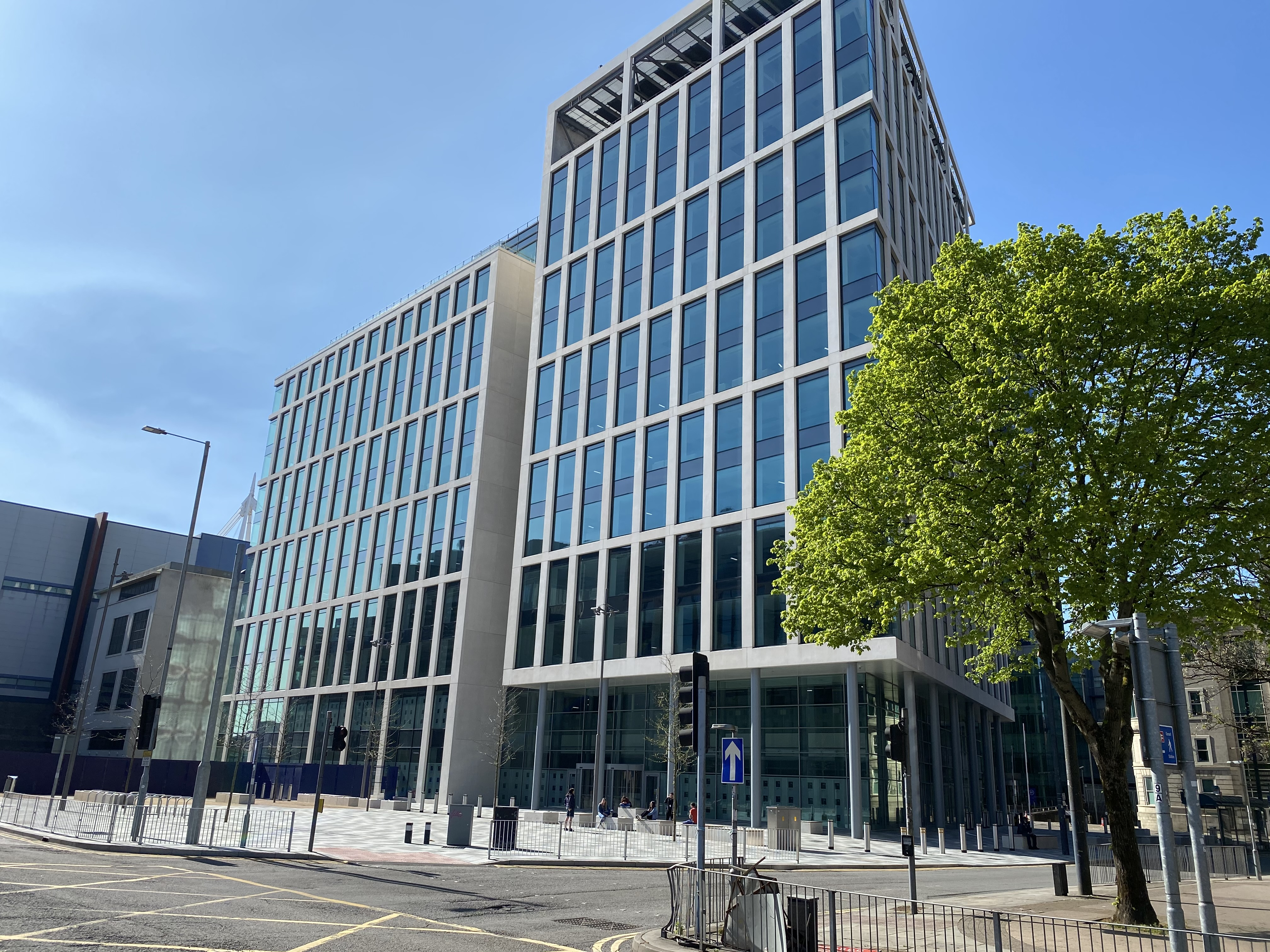
Tŷ William Morgan, Central Square, Cardiff

== Bibliography ==
- Hughes, William (1891). Life and Times of Bishop William Morgan: The Translator of the Bible into the Welsh Language. Society for Promoting Christian Knowledge. hdl:2027/nnc1.1000412872.
- Lloyd, John Edward (1894). "Morgan, William (1540?–1604)" . In Lee, Sidney (ed.). Dictionary of National Biography. Vol. 39. London: Smith, Elder & Co.
- Thomas, Isaac (1988). William Morgan a'i Feibl / William Morgan and his Bible. St. David's day Bilingual Series (in Welsh and English). University of Wales Press. ISBN 0-7083-0982-8.
- Williams, Glanmor (1997). "Unity of Religion or Unity of Language? Protestants and Catholics and the Welsh Language 1536–1660". In Jenkins, Geraint H. (ed.). The Welsh Language before the Industrial Revolution. University of Wales Press. ISBN 0-7083-1418-X.
