= Thomas Huet =

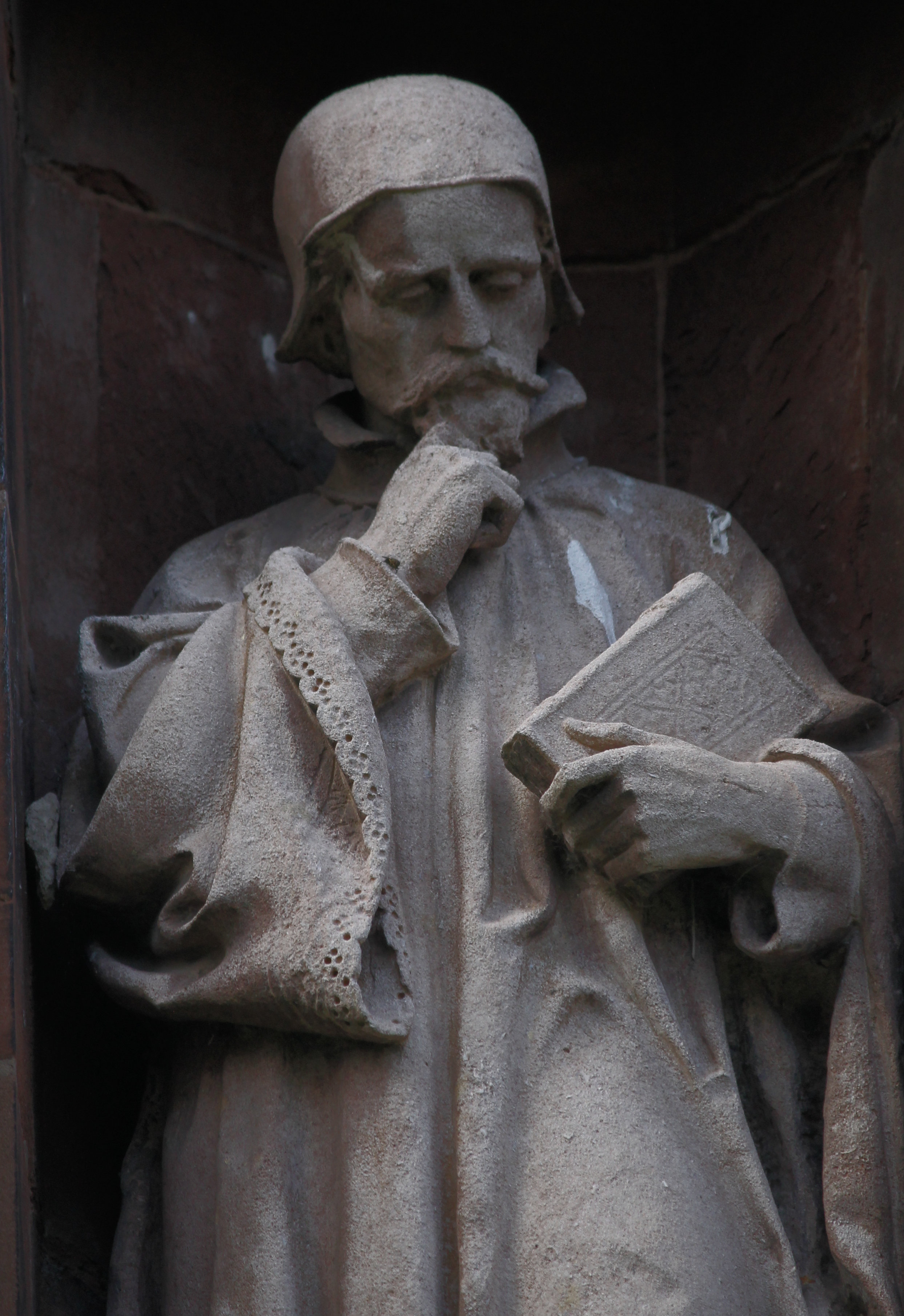
Detail of a statue of Thomas Huet by Richard Lockwood Boulton on the Translators' Memorial (1888–1892), St Asaph Cathedral

Thomas Huet (died 19 August 1591) was a Welsh clergyman and translator of the Bible.

== Life ==
Huet, who was probably from Brecknockshire, Wales originally, is recorded as being a member of Corpus Christi College, Cambridge in 1544. He was Master of the College of the Holy Trinity, Pontefract when it was dissolved. Between 1559 and 1565, he was appointed to various church livings: he became rector of Cefnllys and Llanbadarn Fawr, both in Radnorshire, and also prebendary of Llanbadarn Trefeglwys and Ystrad, both in Ceredigion. He was precentor of St David's Cathedral from 1562 to 1588. Richard Davies, Bishop of St David's, recommended that Huet be appointed bishop of Bangor but this did not take place. Huet assisted Richard Davies and William Salesbury in the translation into Welsh of the New Testament in 1567, particularly the Book of Revelation. In 1571, Huet was named in the charter granted by Queen Elizabeth I as one of the eight founding fellows of Jesus College, Oxford.

Huet died in 1591 and was buried in the church at Llanafan Fawr in Brecknockshire.
