= Richard Parry (bishop) =

Welsh bishop

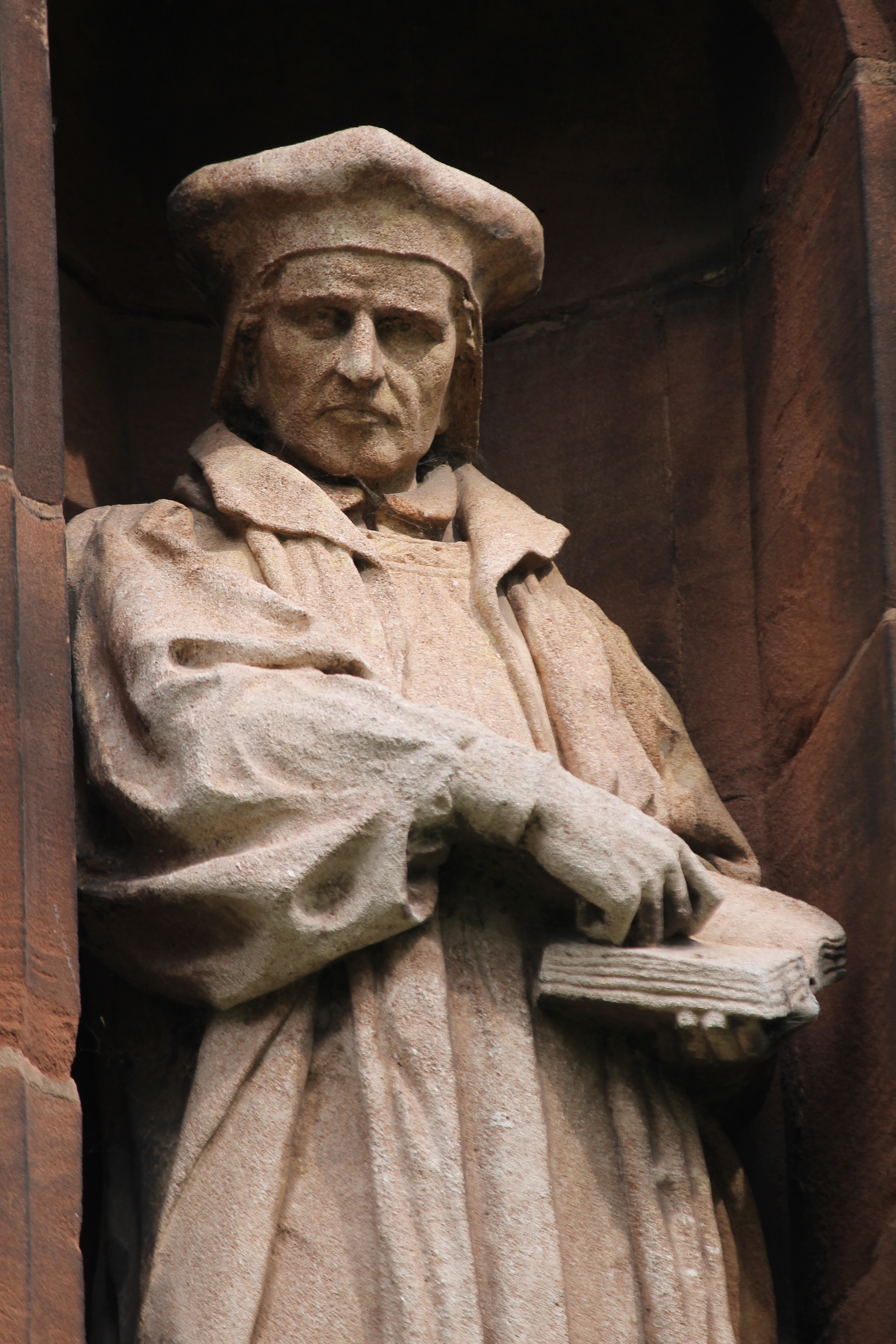
Statue of Richard Parry on the Translators' Memorial in the churchyard of St Asaph Cathedral

Richard Parry (1560–1623) was a Bishop of St Asaph and translator of the Bible to the Welsh language.

Parry was born in 1560, the son of John ap Harri, from Pwllhalog, Cwm, Flintshire, and Ruthin, and his wife, Elen ferch Dafydd ap John, a lady from Llanfair Dyffryn Clwyd, near Ruthin, North Wales. He was educated at Christ Church, Oxford.

He was ordained a deacon in 1584, and in May was instituted to a comportion of the tithes of Llanelidan and the endowment of Ruthin Free School where he became headmaster. His brother-in-law was the lexicologist, John Davies, who assisted him with the revision of the Welsh Bible and Book of Common Prayer
