= William Salesbury =

Welsh scholar

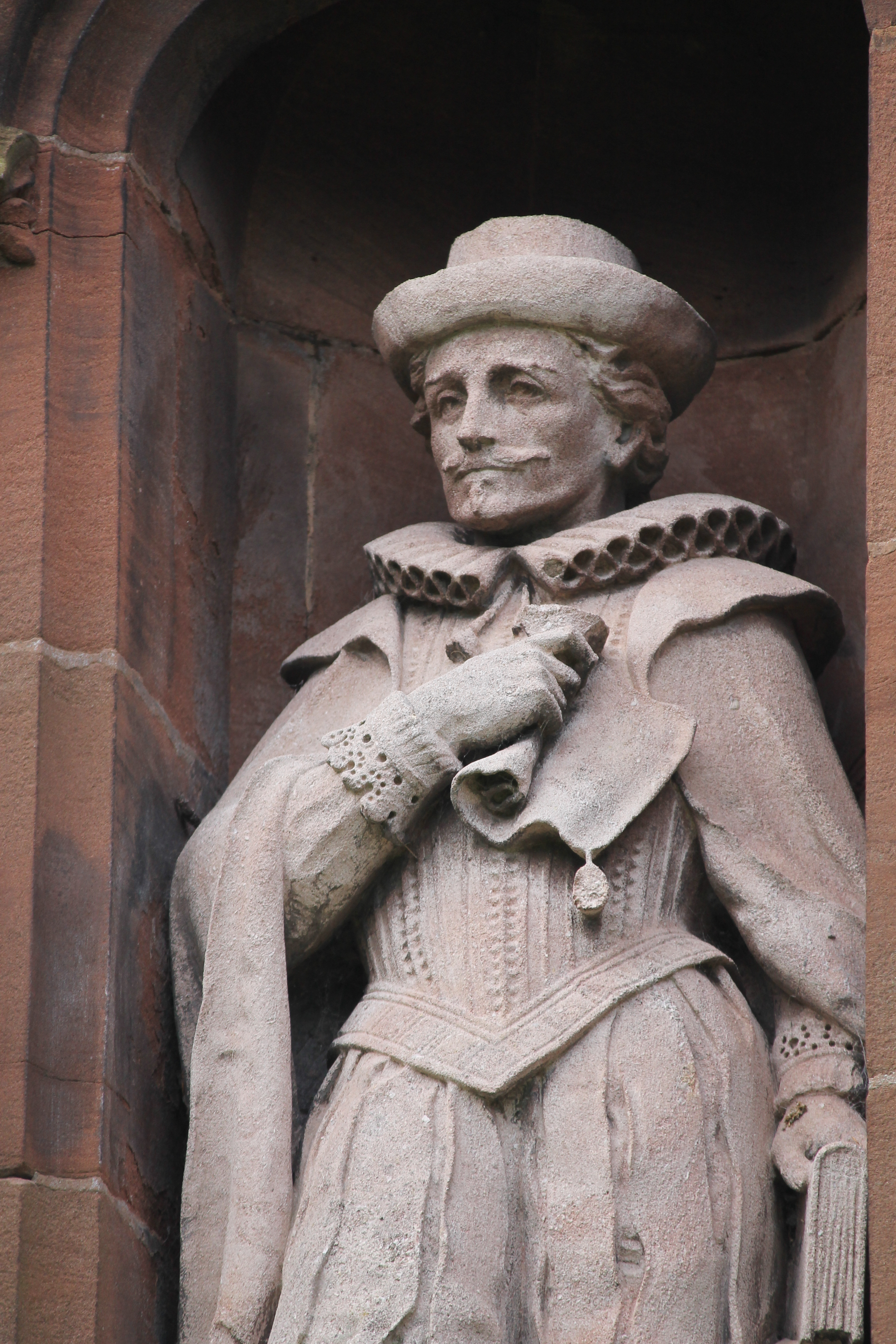
Statue of William Salesbury on the Translators' Memorial in the churchyard of St Asaph Cathedral

William Salesbury, also Salusbury, (c. 1520 – c. 1584) was the leading Welsh scholar of the Renaissance and the principal translator of the 1567 Welsh New Testament.

== Early life ==
Salesbury was born some time before 1520 (possibly as early as 1507) in the parish of Llansannan, Conwy. He was the second son of Ffwg Salesbury (d. 1520) and Annes, daughter of Wiliam ap Gruffydd ap Robin o Gochwillan. By 1540 he had moved to Plas Isa, Llanrwst; this had been the residence of both his father and his brother. He was probably educated locally, and was certainly influenced by the literary traditions of the Vale of Clwyd. He then studied at Oxford University, probably living in Broadgates Hall. Here he studied the Hebrew, Greek and Latin languages, and became familiar with the (banned) writings of Martin Luther and William Tyndale as well as the technology of printing. Here too he was caught up in the renaissance of learning. Mathias suggests that it was at Oxford that Salesbury left the Roman Catholic church and became a Protestant. Although there is no record of his either having taken a degree at Oxford or having gone on to one of the Inns of Court, it is known that in 1550 he was at Thavies Inn. Although he spent considerable time in London, there is no evidence of his having travelled abroad. His wife was Catrin Llwyd, sister of Ellis Price. She died around 1572.

== Career ==
Brinley Jones describes the remarkable range of Salesbury's writings, "the product of a Renaissance humanist scholar, lexicographer, and translator". Mathias describes his motivations as making the Bible available to the Welsh people, and imparting knowledge to them in their own language. In 1547, Salesbury produced an English-Welsh dictionary called A dictionary in Englyshe and Welshe, printed by John Waley 'at London in Foster Lane' in 1547. Mathias conjectures that this may have been the first book to be printed in Welsh. Brinley Jones suggests that the dictionary has the appearance of a work-book, devised in the first place for Salesbury's own use. In 1550 his A briefe and a playne introduction, teachyng how to pronounce the letters in the British tong (now commonly called Walsh)... was printed by Robert Crowley. A revised edition was printed "by Henry Denham for Humphrey Toy, at the sygne of the Helmet in Paules church yarde, The. xvij. of May. 1567." A short comparative study of Welsh sounds with Hebrew and Greek is included, plus an examination of the Latin element in Welsh (which Salesbury had first examined in the dictionary of 1547). Both of these books have become important sources for information about the spoken English of the sixteenth century. One of Salesbury's books of 1550, The Descripcion of the Sphere or Frame of the Worlde, has been described as the first science book in the English language.

Salesbury also published books in Welsh at the same time. In 1547 he published a collection of 930 Welsh proverbs made by Gruffudd Hiraethog (d. 1564), Oll synnwyr pen Kembero ygyd.

In 1550, he published Ban wedy i dynny air yngair o hen gyfreith Howel da vap Cadell brenhin Kymbry ynghylch chwechant mlynedd aeth heibio wrth yr hwn van y gellir deall bot yr offeiriait y pryd hynny yn priodi gwragedd yn ddichwith ac yn kyttal ac wynt in gyfreithlawn. A certaine case extracte[d] out of the auncient law of Hoel da, kyng of Wales in the yere of oure Lorde, nyne hundred and fourtene passed: whereby it maye gathered that priestes had lawfully married wyues at that tyme. This book, printed by Robert Crowley, was in Welsh and English; as the title indicates, it was an attempt to justify Protestant doctrine in favour of a clerical marriage to the Welsh and English by establishing precedent for it in the "auncient law" of a Welsh king. (It was no doubt significant that the present royal family, the Tudors, had Welsh origins.) Also in 1550, a polemical text appeared under Crowley's imprint stating that it was "compiled" by Salesbury: The baterie of the Popes Botereulx, commonly called the high altare. In this work, he took part in one the great controversies of the time, considering the doctrine of the sacrifice of the mass as show in the existence of stone altars in churches. A third Salesbury book with Crowley's imprint in 1551 is a translation of the epistle and gospel readings from the 1549 Book of Common Prayer: Kynniuer llith a ban or yscrythur lan ac a d'arlleir yr eccleis pryd commun, y sulieu a'r gwilieu trwy'r vlwyd'yn: o Cambereiciat. Brinley Jones describes this as his first major contribution towards presenting the scriptures in Welsh.

As a convinced Protestant, Salesbury was obliged to spend most of the reign of Mary I, 1553–1558, in hiding and probably back in Llanrwst. As a consequence his writing and publishing came to a stop.

The belief of Erasmus and Luther that the Bible should be available to all in their native language was firmly advocated by Salesbury. He wrote 'Insist on having Holy Scripture in your language' (mynwch yr yscrythur lan yn ych iaith). With the succession of Elizabeth I, Salesbury went to work on this project. In 1563, an act of parliament ordered the bishops of Wales and Hereford to see that a Welsh translation of the Bible, Book of Common Prayer and administration of the sacraments be ready by 1 March 1567. Quite possibly a confederate in this project, Robert Crowley, Salesbury's former printer, was at this time a Canon of Hereford, having been instituted to the stall or prebend of "Pratum majus" in the cathedral of Hereford c. 1560–63.

Salesbury worked with Richard Davies, Bishop of St. David's, (1 Timothy, Hebrews, James, 1 and 2 Peter) and Thomas Huet, Precentor of St David's, (Revelation) to prepare a translation of the New Testament from the original Greek into Welsh. Salesbury was responsible for a large part of the translation therefore, as well as being editor. This was published on 7 October 1567. As Mathias points out, Salesbury's translations were heavily criticised for being full of Latinisms and other orthographical peculiarities and consequently unintelligible to many of his contemporaries. However, Mathias is still able to describe them as fine translations, both as regards language and style. Moreover, Bishop William Morgan was to virtually adopt Salesbury's version of the New Testament into his Bible of 1588. Sir John Wynn of Gwydir believed that Richard Davies and Salesbury were also collaborating on a translation of the Old Testament but disagreed over the use of one word. Whatever the truth of this, work on the Old Testament did not proceed.

Salesbury also translated the English Book of Common Prayer into Welsh, which was published in 1567 as Y Llyfr Gweddi Gyffredin. Like the Welsh New Testament, this was published by Humphrey Toy.

Salesbury's last recorded work, Llysieulyfr ('Herbal'), was basically a paraphrase of some of the best-known herbals of the time, particularly Leonhard Fuchs's De historia stirpium. William Turner's A New Herball was another source. Most of the entries follow the same pattern—the name(s) in Latin, English, Welsh, a description, where the herbs are found, when they appear, and what properties they possess.

== Death and legacy ==
It is likely that Salesbury died around 1580; the place of his burial is unknown. Brinley Jones considers him the outstanding example of the Welsh Renaissance scholar, broad in his range and interests, inquisitive and enquiring. Mathias concludes that it would be hard to find anybody who has rendered greater service to the Welsh nation than William Salesbury. His translation of the scriptures into Welsh laid the foundations of modern Welsh prose.

== See also ==
- Welsh Bible
