= John Davies (Mallwyd) =

Welsh Anglican priest and scholar (c. 1567 – 1644)

John Davies of Mallwyd
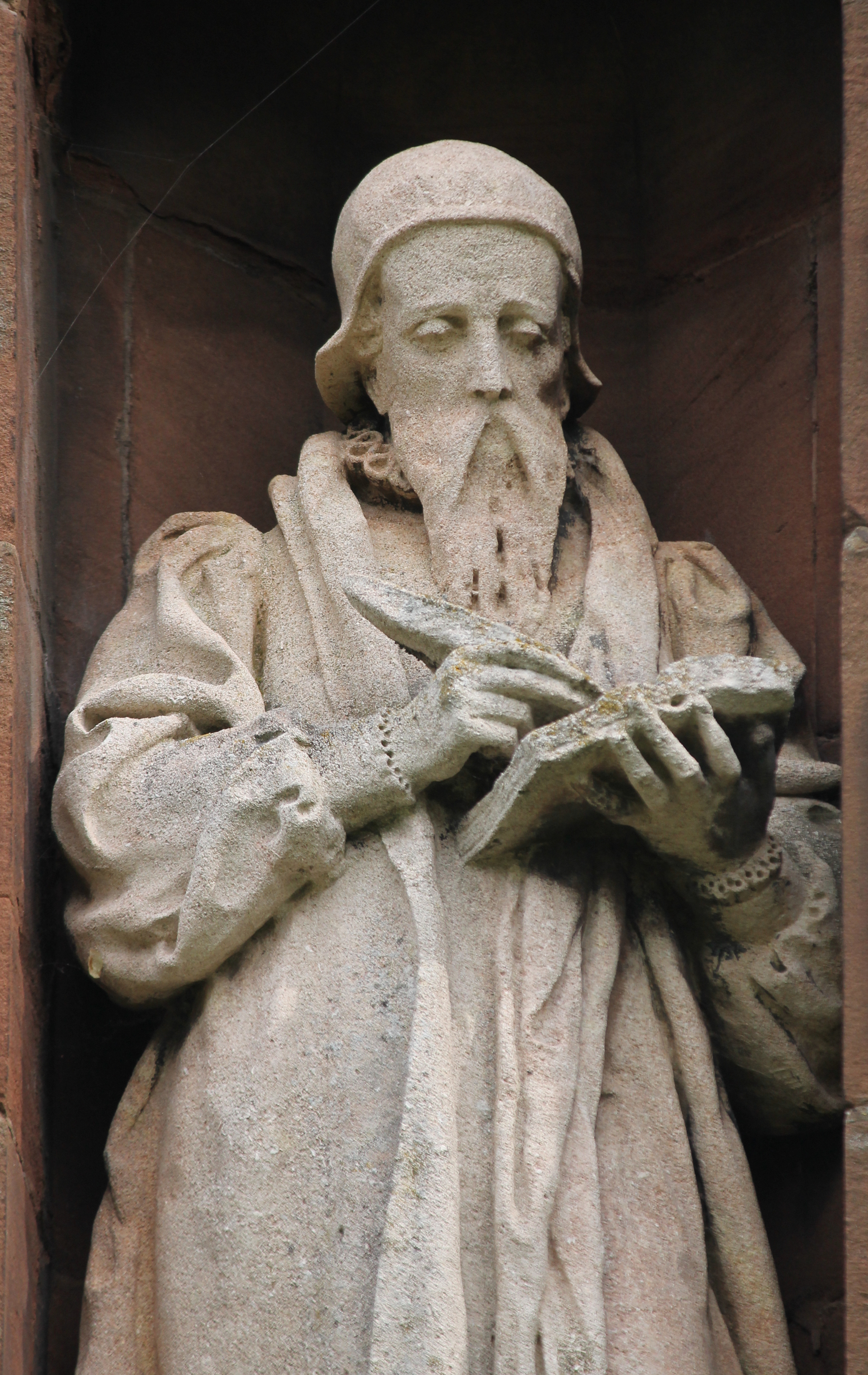
- Statue of John Davies on the Translators' Memorial in the churchyard of St Asaph Cathedral
- Born: c. 1567; Llanferres, Denbighshire
- Died: 15 May 1644; Harlech
- Education: Jesus College, Oxford (MA); Lincoln College, Oxford, (B.D., D.D.)
- Occupations: Vicar, translator, antiquarian
- Spouse: Sian Davies (née Prys)

John Davies (c. 1567 – 1644) was one of the leading scholars of the late Renaissance in Wales. He wrote a Welsh grammar and dictionary. He was also a translator and editor and an ordained minister of the Church of England. His name is traditionally associated with the parish of Mallwyd, Gwynedd, where he was rector from 1604 until his death in 1644.

Born in Llanferres, Denbighshire, the son of a weaver, he graduated from Jesus College, Oxford in 1594. He is believed to have been the main editor and reviser of the 1620 edition of the Welsh translation of the Bible and the 1621 edition of the Welsh translation of the Book of Common Prayer.

He published a Welsh grammar in Latin in 1621, Antiquae linguae Britannicae ..., and a Welsh–Latin Latin–Welsh dictionary in 1632, Antiquae linguae Britannicae ... et linguae Latinae dictionarium duplex. In 1632 he also published Llyfr y resolusion, a masterly translation and Protestant adaptation of The first booke of the Christian exercise, appertayning to resolution (1582) by English Roman Catholic Robert Parsons.

He died, possibly while at Harlech, on 15 May 1644, and was buried at Mallwyd church, where a memorial was erected to him on the 200th anniversary of his death.

== Sources ==
- 'Davies, John (c. 1567–1644)'. In Meic Stephens (Ed.) (1998), The new companion to the literature of Wales. Cardiff: University of Wales Press. ISBN 0-7083-1383-3.
- Davies, Ceri (Ed.) (2004), Dr John Davies of Mallwyd : Welsh Renaissance scholar. Cardiff: University of Wales Press. ISBN 0-7083-1874-6.
- Parry, Thomas (1955), A history of Welsh literature. Translated by H. Idris Bell. Oxford: Clarendon Press.
