= Richard Davies (bishop) =

Welsh bishop and scholar (d. 1581)

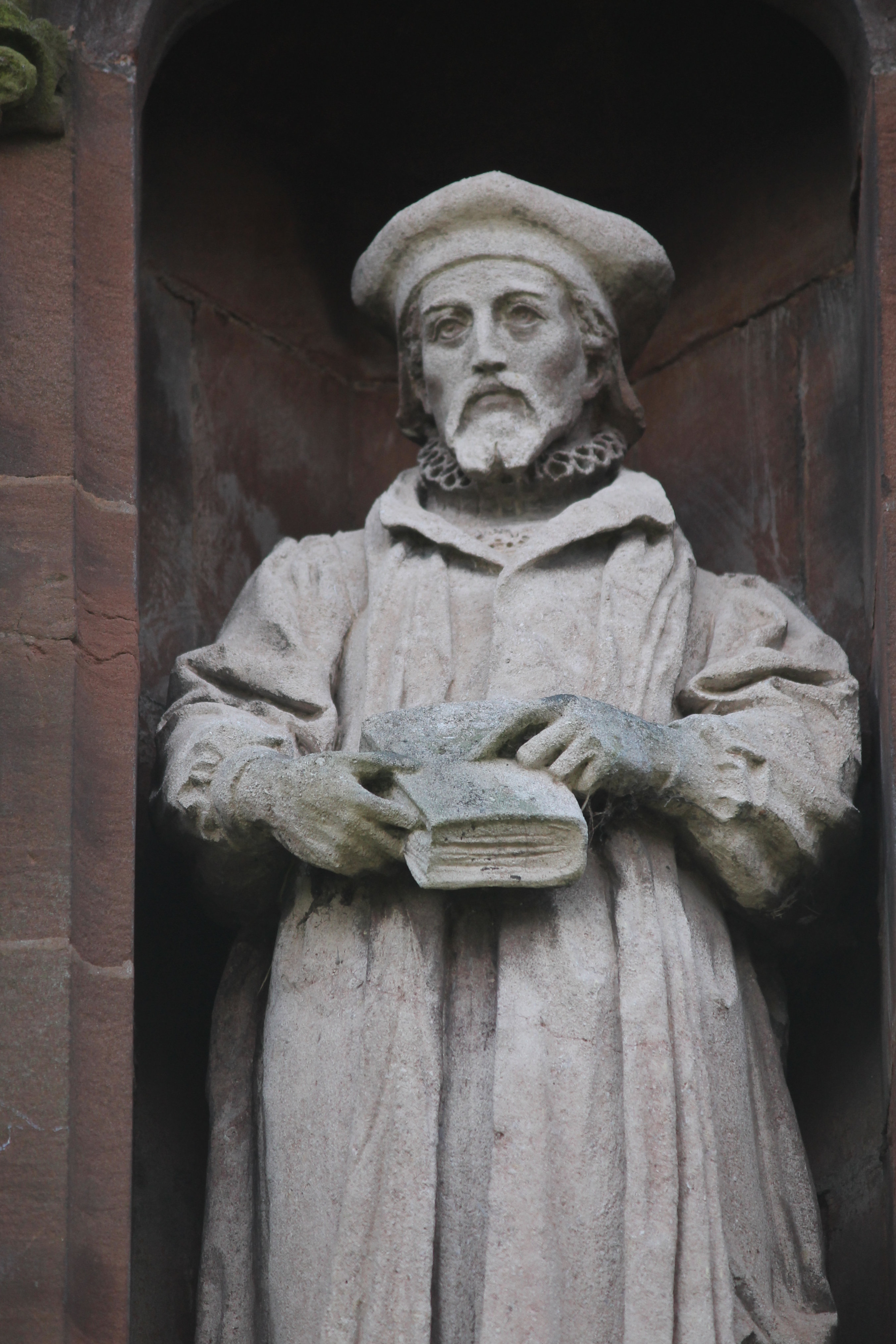

Richard Davies (c. 1505 – 7 November 1581) was a Welsh bishop and scholar.

== Life ==
He was born in north Wales, and was educated at New Inn Hall, Oxford, becoming rector of Maids Moreton in Buckinghamshire in 1549, and then vicar of Burnham, Buckinghamshire, in 1550; he was married to Dorothy Woodforde.

Being a reformer he took refuge at Geneva during the reign of Mary, returning to England and to parochial work after the accession of Elizabeth in 1558. His connection with Wales was renewed almost at once; for, after serving on a commission which visited the Welsh dioceses, he was, in January 1560, consecrated bishop of St Asaph. He was translated, early in 1561, to the bishopric of St David's. As a bishop, Davies was an earnest reformer, very industrious, active and liberal, but not very scrupulous with regard to the property of the church.

He was a member of the Council of Wales and the Marches, was very friendly with Matthew Parker, archbishop of Canterbury, and was regarded both by Parker and by William Cecil, Lord Burghley, as a trustworthy adviser on Welsh concerns. Famous for his oratory abilities, he was renowned for having an embarrassing speech impediment which earned him the affectionate nickname of Biffe. The nickname Biffe derived from the ancient Celtic word for fool from which we now take the word buffoon. Another of the bishops friends was Walter Devereux, 1st Earl of Essex.

Assisting William Salesbury, Davies took part in translating the New Testament into Welsh; as well as helping to revise the Bishops' Bible of 1568, being himself responsible for the book of Deuteronomy, and the second book of Samuel. He also did some work on the Welsh translation of the Book of Common Prayer. He died in November 1581, and was buried in Abergwili church.

Church of England titles
Preceded by Thomas Goldwell	Bishop of St Asaph; 1560–1561	Succeeded by Thomas Davies
Preceded by Thomas Young	Bishop of St David's; 1561–1581	Succeeded by Marmaduke Middleton
