= St Asaph Cathedral =

Cathedral in Denbighshire, Wales

Saint Asaph Cathedral
- Cathedral Church of Saints Asaph and Cyndeyrn
- Eglwys Gadeiriol Llanelwy
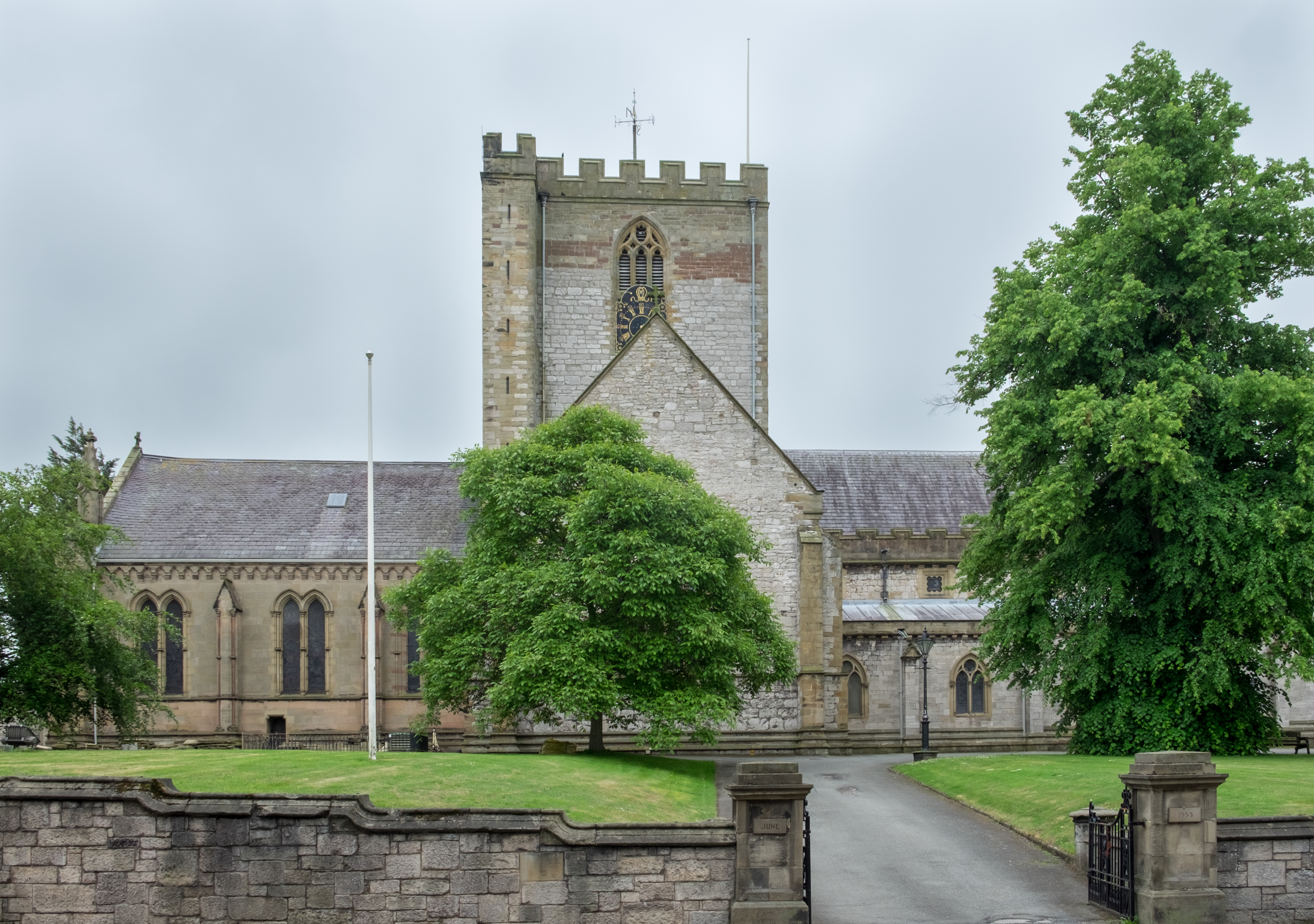
- St Asaph Cathedral from the north-west
- Saint Asaph Cathedral
- 53°15′26″N 3°26′31″W
- Location: St Asaph, Denbighshire
- Country: Wales
- Denomination: Church in Wales
- Previous denomination: Roman Catholic
- Website: https://stasaphcathedral.wales/en

Architecture
- Style: Romanesque architecture, English Gothic architecture
- Completed: Mid-13th century

Administration
- Diocese: St Asaph

Clergy
- Bishop: Gregory Cameron
- Dean: Nigel Williams

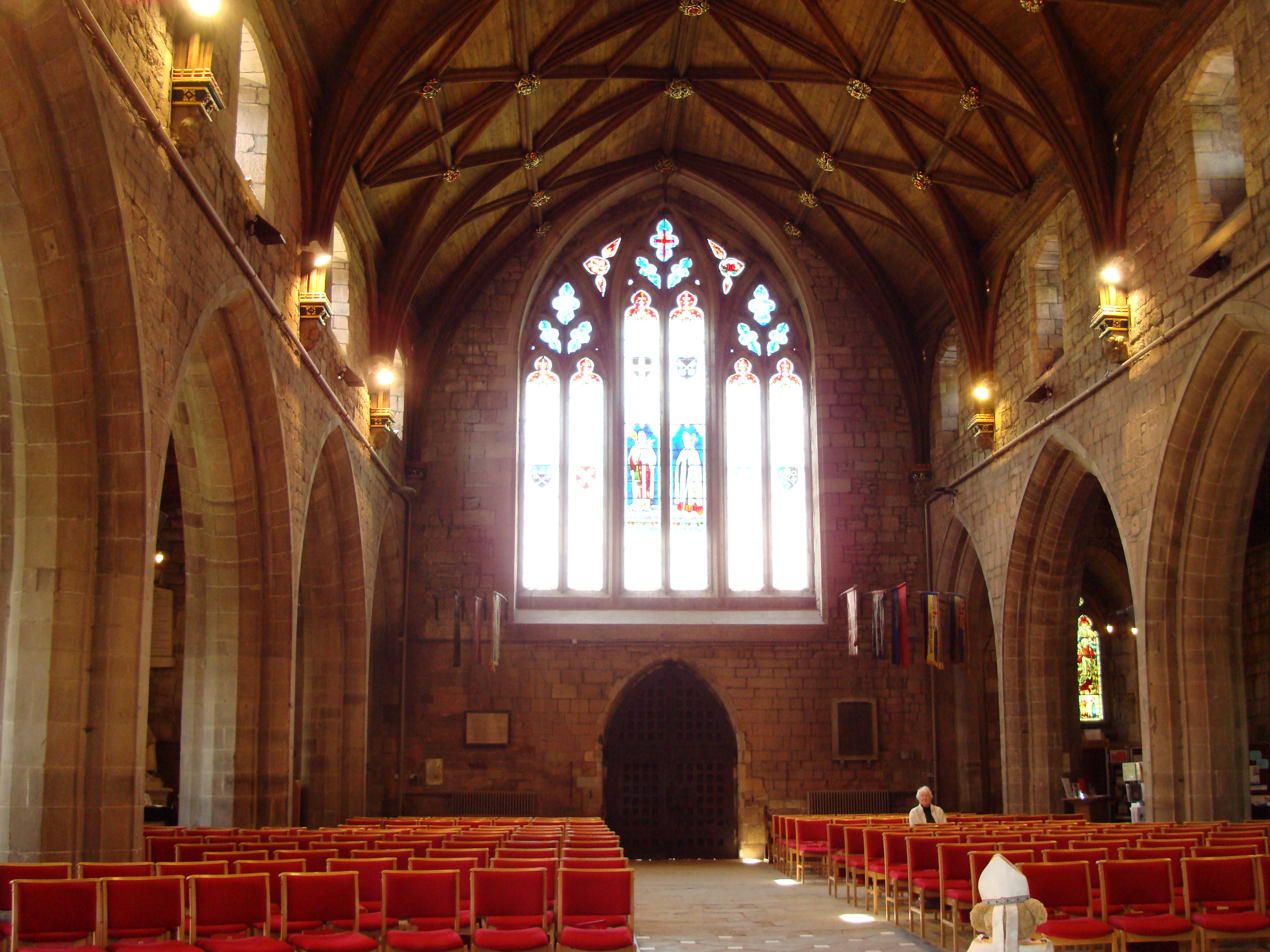
Interior – nave and west end

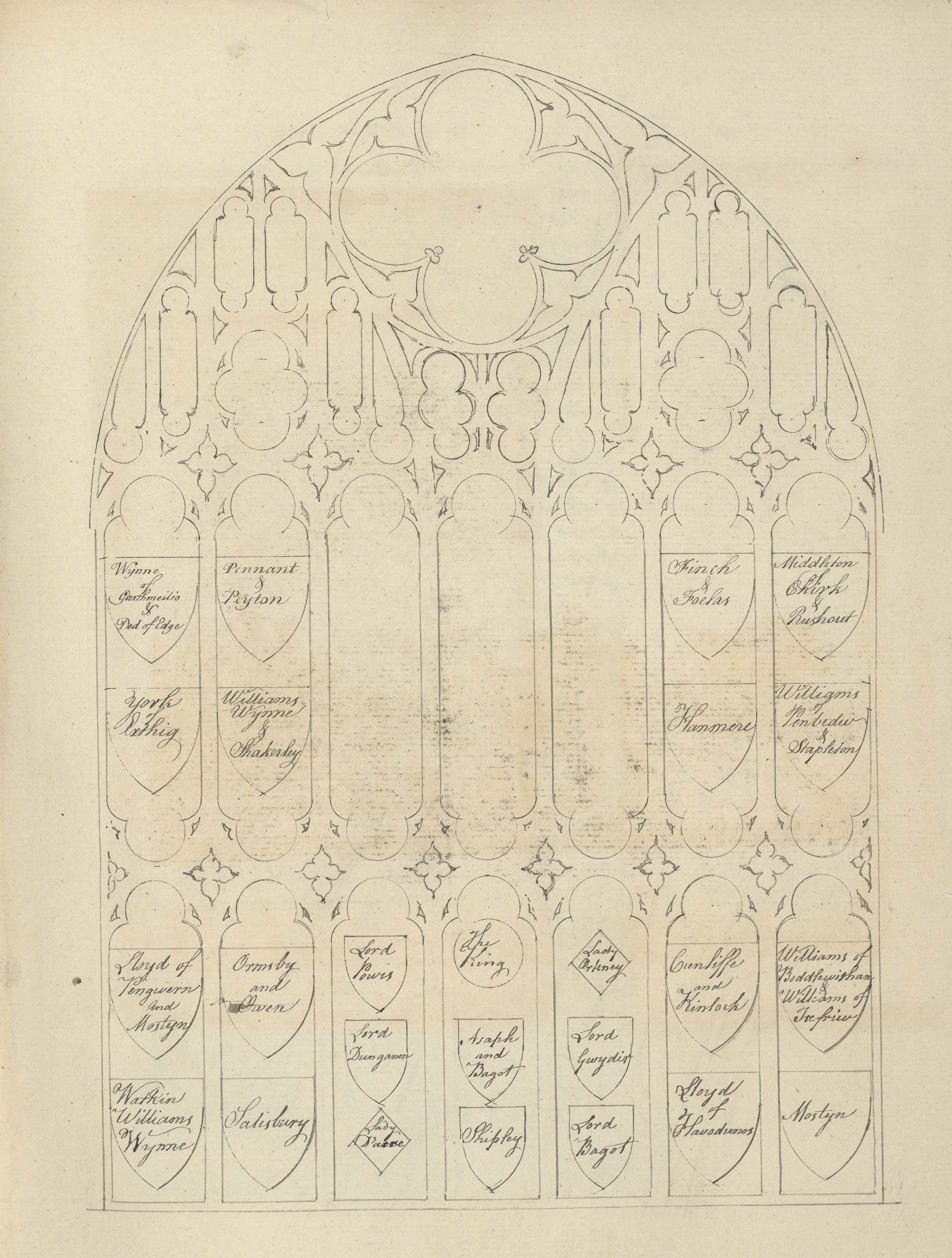
Diagram of window in St Asaph cathedral, with the names of all the families represented by the coats of arms

The Cathedral Church of Saints Asaph and Cyndeyrn, commonly called St Asaph Cathedral (Welsh: Eglwys Gadeiriol Llanelwy), is a Church in Wales cathedral in St Asaph, Denbighshire, north Wales. It is the episcopal seat of the Bishop of St Asaph. The cathedral dates back 1,400 years, while the current building dates from the 13th century.

== History ==
A church was originally built on or near the site by Saint Kentigern in the 6th century (other sources say Saint Elwy in 560). Saint Asa (or Asaph), a grandson of Pabo Post Prydain, followed after this date.

The earliest parts of the present building date from the 13th century when a new building was begun on the site after the original stone cathedral was burnt by soldiers of King Edward I during the Second Welsh War in 1282. Indeed, there had been plans, following the First Welsh War (1277) to relocate the church to Rhuddlan, plans supported by Bishop Anian (Einion I). However these plans came to nought following the war of 1282, as Conwy and Caernarfon were considered to be the new centres of administration.

The rebellion of Owain Glyndŵr resulted in part of the cathedral being reduced to a ruin for seventy years. The present building was largely built in the reign of Henry Tudor and greatly restored in the 19th century.

The cathedral made the national press in 1930 when the tower became subject to significant subsidence and the cathedral architect Charles Marriott Oldrid Scott advised of urgent repairs to be undertaken. It was reported that the cause of the damage was by a subterranean stream. It made the papers again when work was approaching completion in 1935.

Geoffrey of Monmouth served as Bishop of St Asaph from 1152 to 1155, although due to war and unrest in Wales at the time, he probably never set foot in his see. William Morgan (1545 – 10 September 1604) was also Bishop of St Asaph and of Llandaff, and was the first to translate the whole Bible, from Greek and Hebrew, into Welsh. His Bible is kept on public display in the cathedral. The first Archbishop of Wales A. G. Edwards was appointed Bishop of St Asaph in 1889.

In August 2018, the cathedral took the controversial step of making its music staff redundant, citing financial pressures. The cathedral have since re-established the position of Director of Music following the appointment of Paul Booth from September 2019. The choir continue to sing for three services a week.

== Reredos ==
The reredos was commissioned and paid for at the price of ~£600 (~£64,000.00 in 2026 after inflation) by Robert Bamford-Hesketh of Gwrych Castle, which was presented to the cathedral by his wife; Ellen Jones-Bateman. The design of the reredos is by George Gilbert Scott, a well known gothic revivalist and the alabaster was sculpted by Thomas Earp.

== The organ ==
A specification of the organ can be found on the National Pipe Organ Register.

=== List of organists ===
| Year instated | Name |
|---|---|
| 1620 | John Day |
| 1630 | Abednego D. Perkins |
| 1631 | John Wilson |
| 1669 | Thomas Ottey |
| 1680 | William Key |
| 1686 | Thomas Hughes |
| 1694 | Alexander Gerard |
| 1738 | John Gerard |
| 1782 | John Jones |
| 1785 | Edward Bailey |
| 1791 | Charles Spence |
| 1794 | Henry Hayden |
| 1834 | Robert Augustus Atkins |
| 1889 | Llewellyn Lloyd |
| 1897 | Hugh Percy Allen |
| 1898 | Archibald Wayet Wilson |
| 1901 | Cyril Bradley Rootham |
| 1902 | William Edward Belcher |
| 1917 | Harold Carpenter Lumb Stocks |
| 1956 | Robert Duke Dickinson |
| 1962 | James Roland Middleton |
| 1970 | Graham John Elliott |
| 1981 | John Theodore Belcher |
| 1985 | Hugh Davies |
| 1998 | Graham Eccles |
| 2004 | Alan McGuinness |
| 2018 | position abolished |
| 2019 | Paul Booth (position re-established) |

== Burials ==
- John Owen (bishop of St Asaph), Bishop of St Asaph (1629 to 1651)
- Isaac Barrow (bishop), Bishop of St Asaph (1669–1680)—buried in the Cathedral churchyard
- William Mathias (1934–1992), composer, born in Whitland, Carmarthenshire.
- William Carey (bishop), Bishop of St Asaph (1830–1846)—buried in the Cathedral churchyard
- Joshua Hughes, Bishop of St Asaph (1870–1889)
- A. G. Edwards, Bishop of St Asaph (1889–1934) and first Archbishop of Wales

== See also ==
- List of deans of St Asaph—chronological list
