= Bro Machno =

Community in Conwy County Borough, Wales

Coordinates: 53.038°N 3.814°W

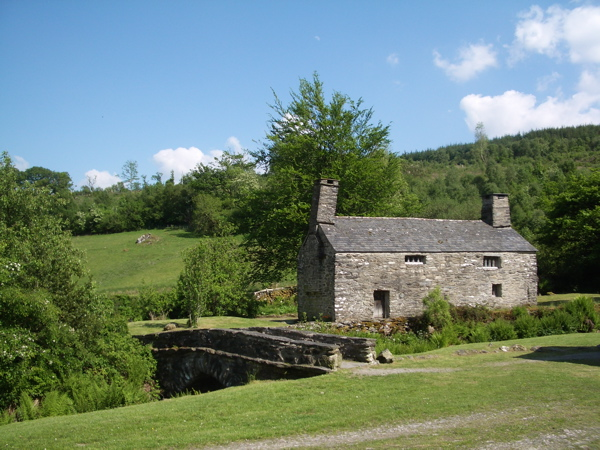
- Tŷ Mawr
- Area: 54.43 km^{2} (21.02 sq mi)
- Population: 617 (2011)
  - Density: 11/km^{2} (28/sq mi)
- OS grid reference: SH9870
- Community: Bro Machno
- Principal area: Conwy
- Preserved county: Clwyd
- Country: Wales
- Sovereign state: United Kingdom
- Post town: BETWS-Y-COED
- Postcode district: LL24
- Dialling code: 01690
- Police: North Wales
- Fire: North Wales
- Ambulance: Welsh
- UK Parliament: Bangor Aberconwy
- Senedd Cymru – Welsh Parliament: Aberconwy
- List of places UK Wales Conwy Map of the community

Bro Machno is a community in Conwy County Borough, in Wales, formed from the former civil parish of Penmachno. It covers the Penmachno Valley, through which runs the Afon Machno, and includes the villages of Penmachno and Cwm Penmachno. To the south west borders Gwynedd, and is located 4.8 miles (7.7 km) south of Betws-y-Coed, 21.8 miles (35.1 km) north west of Corwen, and 19.4 miles (31.2 km) south of Conwy. The whole of the community is within the Snowdonia national park, while much of it forms part of Gwydir Forest. According to the 2011 census, the population of the Bro Machno Parish was 617, of whom 342 (55%) were able to speak Welsh and 214 (34%) had no skills in Welsh.

Tŷ Mawr, a 16th-century farmhouse now owned by the National Trust, was the birthplace of William Morgan, who in 1588 first translated the whole Bible into Welsh. The building is Grade II* listed. Also listed is Coed-y-Ffynnon Farmhouse, where the poet Huw Machno died in 1637, Benar Farmhouse, below Penmachno and dating from the 16th century, Fedw Deg, a 16th-century old house in the north of the community, and Pen-y-Bryn Farmhouse, a 17th-century building overlooking the village.

The Penmachno Document was drawn up by Madog ap Llywelyn in 1294, at the height of his rebellion against Edward I of England. It is the only surviving document issued by one of the Welsh leaders during the revolt, and in it Madog styles himself Prince of Wales, Lord of Snowdonia.

At the head of the valley stands the village of Cwm Penmachno, above which Penmachno and Rhiwbach slate quarries opened at the start of the 19th century. By the 1860s, underground quarrying was being developed, later covering eight levels. Horses carried the slate down the Penmachno and Conwy valleys to Trefriw, until the Rhiwbach Tramway opened in 1863, when all the slate from the Rhiwbach quarry was transported to Blaenau Ffestiniog, to be carried by the Ffestiniog Railway to the harbour at Porthmadog. The Penmachno quarry continued to ship its slate out by road until it closed in 1962.

Because of the remoteness, and inaccessibility during bad weather, of Rhiwbach quarry, the workers lived on site, and a small village developed, including a shop and school, in addition to family accommodation and a barracks for single men. Extensive remains of the village can still be seen, along with the ruins of the engine house which provided the power to haul the slate up the incline to the tramway. At the opposite end of the valley stands the former Penmachno Woollen Mill, a 19th-century water-powered fulling mill.

The community is part of the Uwch Conwy ward for elections to Conwy County Borough Council.
