= Penmachno quarry =

Disused slate quarry in north Wales

Penmachno
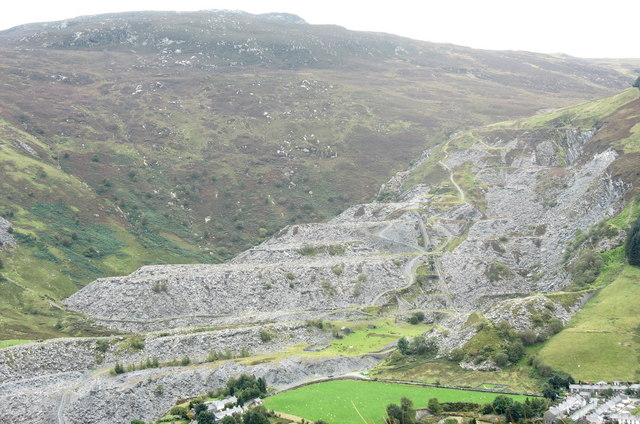
- View of the Penmachno quarry from the north-west, in 2007

- Location in Conwy
- Location: near Cwm Penmachno, Conwy County Borough, Wales, UK; 53.005111°N 3.859802°W grid reference SH7522046962
- Products: Slate
- Type: Quarry
- Opened: c.1818
- Active: c.1818-1909; 1909-1962
- Closed: 1962

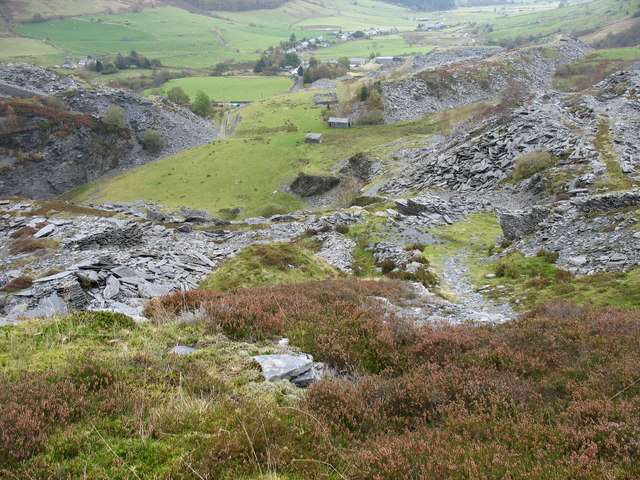
View of the infilled main pit from the south. The outline of the northern mill can be seen just beyond the two remaining buildings

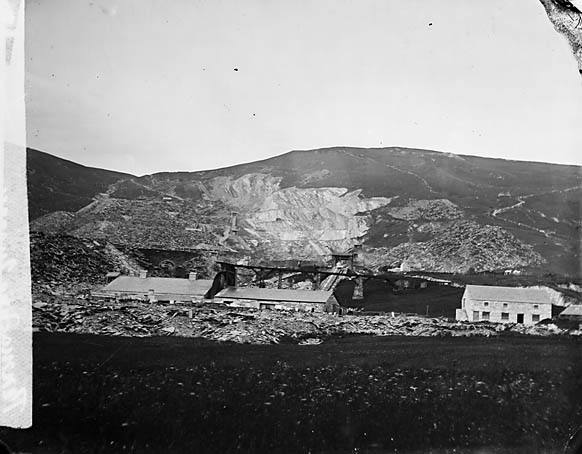
Penmachno quarry around 1875, showing the northern mill

The Penmachno quarry (also known as Cwm Machno quarry, Rhiwfachno quarry, or Tan-y-Rhiw quarry) was a slate quarry near Cwm Penmachno, Conwy, North Wales. It was directly below the Rhiwbach Quarry. It was worked between 1818 and 1962.

== History ==
The quarry was originally known as the Tan-y-rhiw quarry, and it was recorded working in 1818.

By 1872, the quarry was employing 72 workers, rising to 178 in 1898 at its peak.

In 1909, the quarry stopped working for two weeks due to a general depression in the price of slates.

In 1937, Penmachno employed 108 quarrymen. It continued working after the Second World War, eventually closing in 1962.

== Transport ==
Unlike most Welsh slate quarries, it had no railway connection to the outside world, and most of the slate it produced was taken by horse-and-cart to a wharf on the River Conwy at Trefriw. In 1868, the LNWR opened their line to Betws-y-Coed and from that date onwards slate could be hauled there, which was still a distance of nearly 7 miles (11 km) over rough mountain roads.

In the first decade of the 20th century a traction engine was purchased to haul the carts. This arrangement was later replaced by lorries. Some slate was hauled up to Rhiwbach Quarry and taken out to Blaenau Ffestiniog over the Rhiwbach Tramway. There were proposals to link Penmachno and Rhiwbach quarries by tramway, but these proposals were never implemented.

Internally, the quarry had a number of 2 ft (610 mm) gauge tramways and inclines. During the later years of operation a Motor Rail Simplex locomotive was purchased to work the lower tramway. Several proposals were made to connect the quarries by rail.

== Geography ==
The quarry was near the head of the isolated valley of the River Machno, above Penmachno village. Its height on the mountain meant it had a relatively restricted water supply, and on several occasions work stopped due to drought, including in 1891. It was worked as a series of galleried pits, as well as underground chambers.

The highest point of the quarry was just above 1,000 feet (300 m) above sea level. The mills level, at the lower end, was at 609 feet (186 m) elevation. There were originally two pits, the upper working was known as Rhiw Fachno and the lower one was the main Cwm Machno quarry. Adits lead into the mountain from both pits to access the underground workings. About 25 feet (7.6 m) above the Rhiw Fachno pit was the quarry reservoir.

== Geology ==
The five main veins of Ordovician slate that pass through Blaenau Ffestiniog are the North, Back, Narrow, Main (or Old) and South (or New) veins. As they head eastwards, the lower three thin out and disappear, so that by the time Cwt y Bugail Quarry is reached, only the North Vein and Back Vein are left. Immediately to the east of the Cwt y Bugail main adit, the strata are cut by the Dolwyddelan fault, and the same two veins re-appear at Rhiwbach and Penmachno, some 0.6 miles (1 km) further to the south east, and at a considerably lower altitude.

== Bardic chair ==
The chair for the 2019 National Eisteddfod of Wales, held near Llanrwst, was made from slate from Penmachno quarry.
