= Clydwyn =

6th-century Welsh saint

Clydwyn is a 6th-century Pre-Congregational Saint of Wales.

The eldest son of Brychan Brycheiniog and brother of St Tudful, he was himself king.

His children included Clydog, Cynon and St Cynlefr the Martyr and St Berwen.

Although some sources say he conquered the whole of South Wales, this is unlikely, but it is possible that he was at one time also king of Ceredigion and Dyfed along with his brother Dedyw.

He is commemorated by the now ruined church of St Enclydwyn, in Penmachno.

A feast day celebrates his life on 1 November.
