= Rhiwbach quarry =

Disused slate quarry in north Wales

Rhiwbach
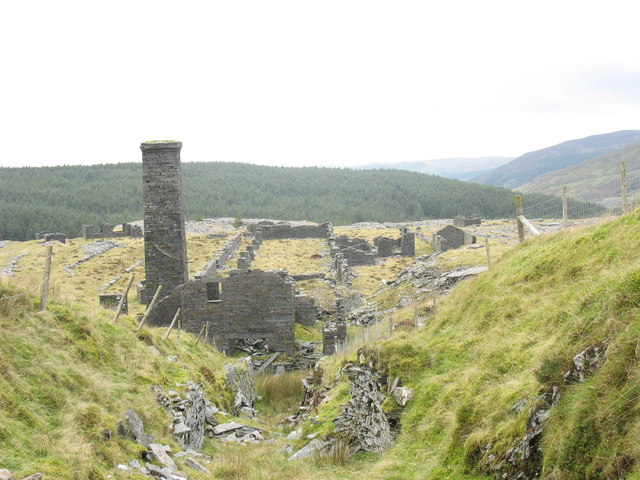
- The ruins of the engine house and mill at Rhiwbach

- Location in Conwy
- Location: near Cwm Penmachno, Conwy County Borough, Wales, UK; 52.9977°N 3.8799°W grid reference SH739461
- Products: Slate
- Type: Quarry
- Opened: 1812
- Closed: 1952

Rhiwbach quarry (also known as Rhiw-bach quarry) was a slate quarry located to the east of Blaenau Ffestiniog in North Wales. The quarry was a remote site; it was nearly 4 miles (6.4 km) to north-east of Duffws, the Festiniog Railway's terminus in Blaenau Ffestiniog. It was the connected to the Ffestiniog Railway by the Rhiwbach Tramway. Commercial operation began around 1812, and it finally closed in 1952. It was the last Welsh slate quarry where workers lived in barracks on the site. 'Rhiwbach' is Welsh for 'Little Hill'.

== History ==
The land on which it was located was owned by Lord Newborough, and small scale working of the site by local people needing roofing materials was carried out in the eighteenth century.

More organised working of the site began in 1812, by two men from Penmachno and Ysbyty Ifan, which gradually developed into a five-man partnership. The quarry was sold to Robert Owen Mousdale of Bryndyffryn, Llanrwst in 1849, and two men worked it for him. The quarry was located in the parish of Penmachno, and the finished slates were exported by boat down the Conwy River. In order to get the slates to the river, they used an old trackway, previously used by drovers taking their cattle to markets in England. The trackway reverted to being a footpath after the Rhiwbach tramway reached the quarry.

In 1852, the Rhiw Bach Slate Quarries Company was set up in Manchester, with Charles Edward Cawley as its civil engineer, but by 1855 the company working the quarry was the Cambrian Slate Quarrying Company.

In 1853, the Manchester & Ffestiniog Slate & Slab Co Ltd was created, to buy out the quarry for £28,000 (equivalent to £2,607,155 in 2025). This was followed in 1858 by the incorporation of the Festiniog Slate Quarry Co Ltd, with a capital of £100,000 (equivalent to £10,743,772 in 2025), which consisted of several directors from a similarly named company which was set up in 1853, to buy out the Penmachno quarry, a little to the north, and construct a tramway to it from Blaenau Ffestiniog. In 1860, agreement was reached with the Ffestiniog Railway on rates for the carriage of Rhiwbach slates, and the construction of an Extension Railway, on which the Ffestiniog would supply the rolling stock for a period of 21 years. The extension, known as the Rhiwbach Tramway, was financed by the quarry, but built by the Ffestiniog Railway. It was largely completed in 1861, as two quarries began using it in early 1862, but it was not fully completed until 1863. In the meantime, Rhiwbach built a wharf at Porthmadog in 1861, and carriage of their slates on the Ffestiniog Railway was first recorded in 1863, when 3,964 tons were transported. During the 1860s, the main mill had a large roof supported by columns made of slate waste, and in a departure from established practice in the slate industry, Rhiwbach used corrugated iron sheets to fill in the spaces between the columns, becoming the first user of this new material in that context.

The original company was wound up in 1877, and re-constituted as the Festiniog Slate Company Limited. Operation was sporadic until the company was liquidated in 1891. However, work continued at the quarry, under the direction of H Humphries, who traded as "Rhiw Bach Quarry Owners". By 1896 there were 95 employees recorded at the site, of which 29 worked underground. Humphries continued to work the quarry until 1913, when his company was wound up and the quarry closed. Some slate was exported via the Ffestiniog Railway in 1918, despite the fact that the quarry was officially closed, and the First World War legislation concerning labour still applied. In the following year the Festiniog Slate Quarries Company Limited was incorporated to work the quarry, and in 1928, the enterprise was sold to the Maenofferen quarry. Parts of the tramway were relaid, and they continued to operate the quarry until 1952.

By the 1920s, workers had become increasingly reluctant to walk the distances required to reach the quarry. A lorry was purchased, and fitted with rudimentary seats made from planks of wood. It reduced the distance that the men had to walk, rather than eliminating it, as the climb from the Cwm Machno quarry to Rhiwbach was too steep for the lorry to negotiate. The lorry therefore stopped at Cwm Machno, and the workers still had to walk the final uphill section.

In 1952, the quarry closed for the final time. The tramway was lifted from the Rhiwbach quarry to the junction with the tramway from Cwt y Bugail quarry, which continued to use the tramway for several more years.

== Geography ==
The quarry lay approximately 3 1/2 miles (5.6 km) east of Bethania, the eastern part of Blaenau Ffestiniog, and approximately 2 miles (3.2 km) south-east of Cwm Penmachno. It was located at the head of the Cwm Machno, to east of the watershed between the Afon Machno, a tributary of the Afon Conwy, and the Afon Teigl, a tribritury of the Afon Dwyryd.

== Geology ==
There are five main veins of Ordovician slate which pass through Blaenau Ffestiniog, longitudinally (from east to west). From north to south, these veins are called: the North Vein, the Back Vein, the Narrow Vein, the Main (or Old) Vein, and the South (or New) Vein. As they head eastwards, the lower three thin out and disappear, so that by the time Cwt y Bugail quarry is reached, only the North Vein and Back Vein are left. Immediately to the east of the Cwt y Bugail main adit, the strata are cut by the Dolwyddelan fault. The same two veins re-appear at Rhiwbach, 0.6 miles (1 km) further to the south east, at a considerably lower altitude. These same veins are also worked by the Penmachno quarry immediately north of Rhiwbach.

== Description ==
There were two sets of workings in the Rhiwbach quary: The 'old' workings, which are located on the North Vein, are just to the south on the exit incline, and the 'new' workings on the Back Vein, a little further to the south.

With the opening of the Rhiwbach Tramway in 1853, the quarry was extended underground, and was eventually worked on eight floors. Major development in the 1860s included the installation of a single-cylinder steam engine and two Cornish boilers, which provided the steam. The equipment was manufactured by the Haigh Foundry of Wigan, and the engine, known as "Injan Fawr" (the big engine) was connected to several inclines, including the main exit incline which rose up from the site to the Rhiwbach Tramway. Unlike most quarries in the area, this was a powered incline, because the loaded wagons had to ascend it, whereas at most local quarries, the weight of the loaded wagon descending the main incline was sufficient to raise the empty wagons back up to the quarry. The engine house was built by the contractor Owain Gethin Jones, who was based locally in Penmachno, and the arrangement of using one engine to power several includes was unique in the Welsh slate industry. At some point, this engine also powered the main mill, as well as a rope-hauled vertical shaft with a cage, although this had been abandoned by 1888. A second engine, "Injan Fach" (the little engine), later powered the main mill, situated near the bottom of the exit tramway, and a smaller mill to the south-east also had its own engine. New underground workings were started in 1899, to the east of the main mill, and the incline to raise the slate was again powered by the Injan Fawr.

The peak output of the quarry was in 1869, when nearly 8,000 tons of finished slates were produced, although this had reduced to below 4,000 tons within a few years. A steam engine powered the mill, and also powered the incline up to the tramway and other inclines to raise rock from the workings. A 600-yard (550 m) adit was cut in the 1890s, which provided natural drainage for much of the underground workings. The quarry manager, Henry Humphries, investigated the use of wire saws around 1900. They had been used in an Italian marble quarry at Carrera since 1898, and in the Pyrenees, had been used in the Labassere slate quarry. Three steel wires were formed into a loop, with sand and water used as the cutting agent. Despite Humphries' enthusiasm, the trials were unsuccessful, because the materials used were not sufficiently robust. Rhiwbach was the first slate quarry in Britain to try them, and although further trials were carried out at Oakeley Quarry in 1901/02, it would be another 60 years before they were used for cutting slate, first at Llecwedd and then at Penrhyn, Maenofferen and Aberllefenni. From 1902, the steam engine also drove an air compressor, which enabled compressed air rock drills to be used. The manager enquired about other methods of modernisation in 1906, consulting pamphlets on electric rock-drilling machinery published in Cleveland, and one called La Puleggia Penetrante, published in Rome, the title of which means 'the penetrating pulley'.

By 1935, the annual output had dropped to 1,000 tons, and steam power was replaced by electricity. There were problems with obtaining men prepared to work the quarry, and it closed in 1952. At the time there were two men still living in barracks on the site, the last to do so in the Welsh slate industry.

=== Internal Community ===
As the only connection to the outside world was initially a rough track, a community developed within the quarry site. Houses were built, to which were added a shop and a meeting room, which was used as a school and a chapel. The company also provided some barracks for men who travelled to the quarry and lodged there during the week. There were barracks with two or three bedrooms, but whereas some larger concerns such as the Dinorwic quarry provided such accommodation free of charge, the men at Rhiwbach had to pay rent of between 2s 4d and 5s 8d (12p and 28p) per month. Such provision was condemned by a doctor's report on the state of mines in Merionethshire published in 1895, which stated that most barracks were overcrowded, dirty, and lacked sanitary arrangements, but whether the barracks at Rhiwbach fitted this general pattern is unknown. The manager's house was unusual, as it was sited close to the workers' houses and to the workings. Two rows of lavatories were also provided for use by the villagers. Some idea of what the housing looked like can be gained from a painting of the site, created by an unknown artist. It shows that the "Barracks Mawr" consisted of two-storey buildings, and that there were workshops in the centre of the hamlet, while the schoolroom was constructed of corrugated iron.

== Transport ==
Because of its remote location, transport was a problem for the quarry in its early years. As it is situated in the Cwm Machno (Machno Valley), the obvious route for exporting its products was northwards down the Cwm Machno and Dyffryn Conwy to Trefriw quay. From there, slates could be loaded into river boats for onward transfer to Conwy, or directly into sea-going vessels. Although it was downhill, it was not ideal, as it involved around 14 miles (23 km) by cart to Trefriw, and then a further 10 miles (16 km) on the river. A shorter route to the south was possible, carting the slates to the Afon Dwyryd at Maentwrog, a journey of about 7 miles (11 km), and a further 8 miles (13 km) by boat to Ynyscyngar. However, from the quarry, there was a climb of 250 feet (76 m) in order to cross the watershed. Consequently, most product used the northern route to begin with, but from the 1830s, the southern route via Maentwrog was used.

In 1862, the Rhiwbach Tramway was built, which connected the quarry to the Festiniog Railway at Blaenau Festiniog. This in turn gave the Rhiwbach quarry a rail link to Portmadoc, a major port on Cardigan Bay. The quarry used the Rhiwbach Tramway for the rest of its life, until closure in 1952.

=== Locomotives ===
Name	Type	Builder	Date	Works number	Notes
	0-4-0PM	Baguley	1919	731	Supplied secondhand by Baguley in 1924, having originally worked at Bicester Aerodrome.
	4wPM	Rhiwbach quarry			Moved to Maenofferen quarry
	4wPM	Rhiwbach quarry			Out of use by 1963

== Bibliography ==
- Boyd, James I.C. (1975a). The Festiniog Railway (Volume 1). Oakwood Press.
- Boyd, James I.C. (1975b). The Festiniog Railway (Volume 2). Oakwood Press.
- Bradley, V J; Hindley, P, eds. (1968). Industrial and Independent Locomotives and Railways of North Wales. Birmingham Locomotive Club.
- Gwyn, David (2015). Welsh Slate - Archaeology and History of an Industry. Royal Commission on the Ancient and Historical Monuments of Wales. ISBN 978-1-871184-51-8.
- Lewis, M.J.T. (2003). Blaen y Cwm and Cwt y Bugail Slate Quarries. Adit Publications. ISBN 978-0-9522979-3-2.
- Lewis, Michael; Denton, John (1974). Rhosydd Slate Quarry. The Cottage Press (no isbn).
- Lindsay, Jean (1974). A History of the North Wales Slate Industry. David and Charles. ISBN 978-0-7153-6265-5.
- Richards, Alun John (1999). The Slate Regions of North and Mid Wales. Gwasg Carreg Gwalch. ISBN 978-0-86381-552-2.
