= Tŷ Mawr Wybrnant =

Historic cottage in Conwy, Wales

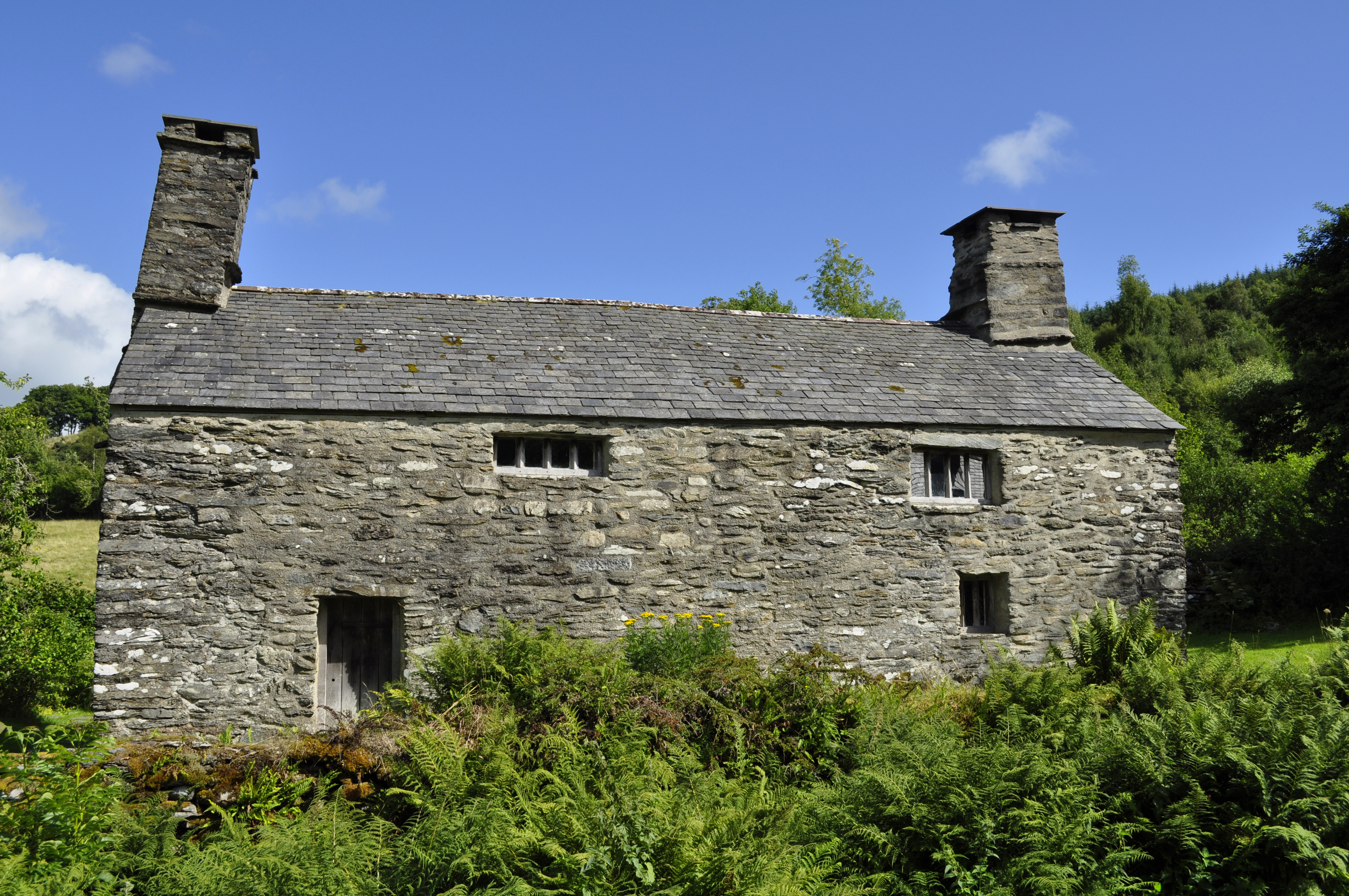
- Tŷ Mawr Wybrnant in 2013
- Location: Bro Machno, Conwy County Borough, Wales
- Coordinates: 53°03′17″N 3°50′12″W
- Type: Historic house museum
- Owner: National Trust
- Website: Tŷ Mawr Wybrnant

Tŷ Mawr Wybrnant is a house located in the Wybrnant Valley, in the community of Bro Machno, near Betws-y-Coed in Conwy County Borough, North Wales. It was the birthplace of Bishop William Morgan, first translator of the whole Bible into Welsh.

== Restoration ==
Tŷ Mawr Wybrnant is owned by the National Trust and has been restored to its probable 16th-century appearance. Despite its name (Tŷ Mawr, "Big House") it is very small by today's standards.

The property houses some old furniture and a collection of Welsh Bibles, including William Morgan's Bible of 1588. There are also other Bibles in many other languages, donated by visitors to the house from around the world. In May 2026 the house and Bible collection were featured in the BBC series Hidden Treasures of the National Trust.

== Access and conservation ==
The house is most easily reached from the village of Penmachno, 4 miles (6.4 km) from Betws-y-coed, but can also be reached from the A470 between Betws-y-coed and Dolwyddelan.

The building was restored in the 1980s to mark the quatercentenary of the translation. Ty Mawr Wybrnant closed to visitors in early 2020 due to the COVID-19 pandemic. The collection of Bibles was temporarily moved to a dedicated exhibition at Chirk Castle.

== Etymology ==
The Afon Wybrnant is the stream near which the house is located, and its name is usually appended to the house's name to distinguish it from other properties also called Tŷ Mawr. The origins of the name Wybrnant are not wholly known. Although nant denotes a small stream and wybr is an old word for sky or cloud, some would have it that the word is derived from a corruption of gwiber, meaning "adder" or "viper". According to legend, long ago a gwiber was a huge flying snake, and one lived in this valley.

== See also ==
- Bible translations into Welsh
