= Trefriw =

Village and community in Conwy, Wales

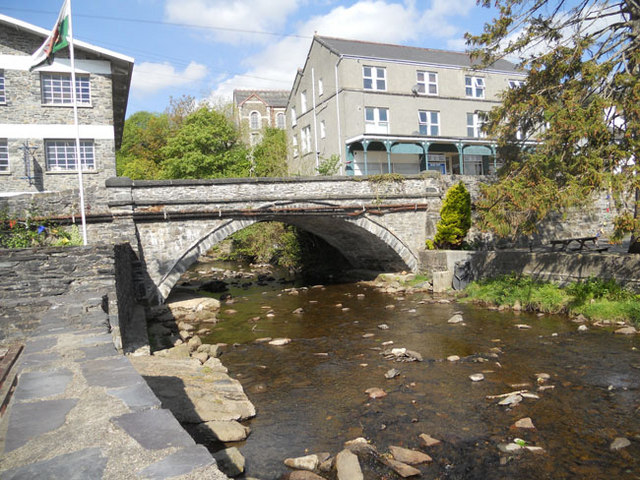
- Afon Crafnant

- Location within Conwy
- Population: 783 (2011)
- OS grid reference: SH779632
- Community: Trefriw
- Principal area: Conwy
- Preserved county: Clwyd
- Country: Wales
- Sovereign state: United Kingdom
- Post town: TREFRIW
- Postcode district: LL27
- Dialling code: 01492
- Police: North Wales
- Fire: North Wales
- Ambulance: Welsh
- UK Parliament: Bangor Aberconwy
- Senedd Cymru – Welsh Parliament: Bangor Conwy Môn
- List of places UK Wales Conwy 53.152°N 3.825°W Map of the community

Trefriw (Welsh pronunciation: [trɛˈvrɪu]) is a village and community in Conwy County Borough, Wales. It lies on the river Crafnant a few miles south of the site of the Roman fort of Canovium, sited at Caerhun. At the last three censuses, the population of the community has been recorded as 842 in 1999, 915 in 2001, and 783 in 2011 (from a total of 368 households).

Trefriw lies on the edge of Snowdonia, on the B5106 road to the north-west of Llanrwst, and about 4½ miles north of Betws-y-Coed by road. It is located on the western slopes of the glaciated Conwy valley, below the ridge of Cefn Cyfarwydd, the village having been largely built in a semicircle at the point where the river Crafnant flows from its hanging valley to join the river Conwy. The river Crafnant still provides power for the woollen mill, and in the past provided power for a number of other industries based along its banks, such as a forge which provided quarry tools. The community includes the hamlet of Llanrhychwyn.

Most of the village lies within the Snowdonia National Park, the boundary running down the main street of the village.

Apart from its reputation as a good starting point for walks (the village has Walkers are Welcome status and stages an annual walking festival), Trefriw is today mostly known for its woollen mill, and for the nearby chalybeate spa, first known to have been used by the Romans and further developed in about 1700. Its waters were one of very few throughout Europe to have been classified as a medicine due to their high iron content.

== History ==
=== Romans ===
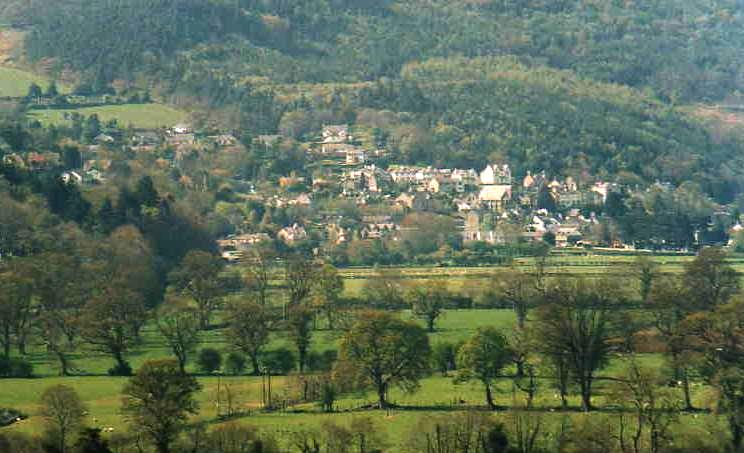
A view of Trefriw from across the valley, near Llanrwst

A major Roman road (Sarn Helen) ran southwards through Trefriw from the fort at Caerhun (between Trefriw and Conwy) to the fort at Tomen-y-mur (near Trawsfynydd), and beyond, ultimately reaching Moridunum at Carmarthen. It is likely that there were in fact two roads passing through the Trefriw area, a valley route, and a higher mountain route which went on to link to the smaller forts at Caer Llugwy (near Capel Curig) and Pen-y-Gwryd, near Snowdon. The actual lines of these roads through Trefriw can only be conjecture today, but the whole route is discussed in depth in the book Sarn Helen by J. Cantrell & A. Rylance (Cicerone Press, 1992).

=== Middle Ages ===
Llywelyn Fawr (Llywelyn the Great), Prince of North Wales and ruler of the Kingdom of Gwynedd (not to be confused with the modern-day county of Gwynedd), chose Trefriw as the site for a hunting lodge in the 12th century. Given that he had a number of strongholds in north-west Wales, it is not possible to know how much time he spent in the village, although it is reported that he preferred his lodge at Trefriw to his Palace at Aber. There are no remains to be seen today but it is now believed that it was on the site of the Ebenezer Chapel on the main hill. Llywelyn married Siwan or Joan, the youngest daughter of King John of England in 1204 or 1205, when she was only about 13. Despite her relative youth, she in time grew weary of the trek up the steep hill to the church at Llanrhychwyn (regarded by many as being the oldest in Wales), and as a result, in about 1230 Llywelyn endowed a church on the site where St Mary's, Trefriw now stands.

Llanrhychwyn (which takes its name from Rhochwyn, son of Helig ap Glannog) is now a small hamlet. In Llywelyn's time, however, and up to the early 19th century, it was larger than Trefriw itself, which consisted of "a few houses here and there". In Hanes Trefriw (English: History of Trefriw), Morris Jones writes in Welsh that Llywelyn "built a church for [his wife's] use, and for the use of the inhabitants, for their kindness towards him, and that he donated a number of farms from the parish of Llanrhychwyn, naming them as the parish of Tref Rhiw Las. It got this name from the slope on which it stood".

At the lower (northern) end of the village is located "Ffrwd Gwenwyn y Meirch" - ("Horse Poison Stream"). It is said that the stream was poisoned by a traitor, resulting in the deaths of many of Llywelyn's soldiers' horses, at a time when he was at war with the English.

The Red Book of Hergest (1375–1425) refers to "Kymwt Treffryw", the Commote (Cwmwd in Welsh) of Trefriw. This is possibly the earliest written reference to the village.

=== Stuart times ===
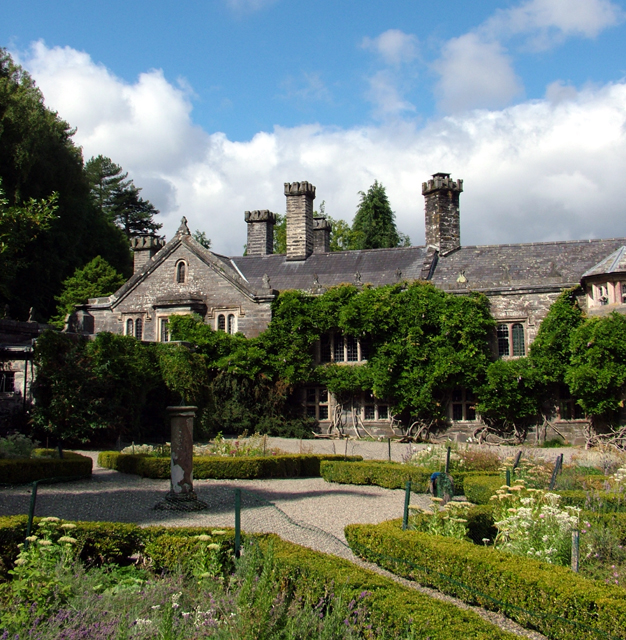
Gwydir Castle, ancestral home of the Wynn family

It seems probable that Trefriw has links with the Gunpowder Plot of 1605. Thomas Wiliems, who was probably born in the village, and a nephew of Sir John Wynn of Gwydir, went to Brasenose College, Oxford, and returned to work as a physician. He was an authority on vegetarianism, and also published a Welsh/Latin dictionary. In 1573 he became Curate of Trefriw. He is reputed to have been a papist (he was certainly charged on that score at Bangor in 1607) and as such would probably have known of the plot to blow up Parliament. According to some sources it was he who, in warning his relative John Wynn not to go to the State Opening, was responsible to either a smaller or greater extent for the suspicions which ultimately caught Guy Fawkes. This story is the basis for a short historical novel written for children by Gweneth Lilly, entitled Treason at Trefriw (Gomer Press, 1993).

=== 19th century ===
In 1817 a free school was founded (and subsequently financially supported) in Trefriw by Lord Willoughby de Eresby, for the benefit of poor children of the village, and those from the adjoining parishes. The earliest mill (a pandy or fulling mill) dates back to the 15th century. In 1820 a new pandy was built, this still carrying the faded name "Vale of Conwy Woollen Mill". By early in the 19th century the village had a water-powered fulling mill (replacing the former cottage industry which dated back centuries), but serious development of the industry began only after it was bought by Thomas Williams in 1859. The current woollen mill is still owned by the descendants of Thomas Williams. The current roadside mill building, sited below the original buildings, was built in the 1970s.

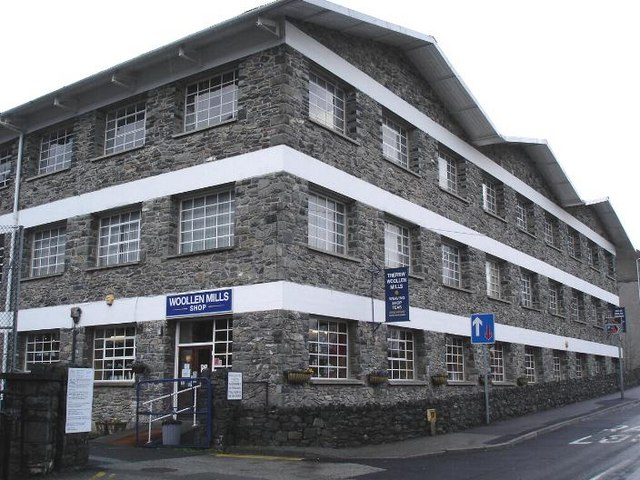
Trefriw Woollen Mill today

David Cox Jnr. (1809–85) painted Trefriw near Llanrwst, with mill.

Following the construction of the Llanrwst to Conwy Toll Road in 1777, a toll house, Hen Dyrpeg, was built south of Trefriw, but this stood some 70m from the road on elevated ground, to avoid flooding. Following a fair degree of toll evasion, and the fact that traffic from the Gwydir Forest did not pass it, a replacement toll house, 'Gwydir Gate', was built in the 1820s nearer the village. These toll houses were passed by traffic heading for the quay at Trefriw.

In the 19th century Trefriw was Wales' largest inland port, the river Conwy being tidal almost up to neighbouring Llanrwst. Given the fact that, at one time, Llanrwst was one of the ten largest towns in Wales, it can be seen that the Conwy Valley had great historical significance.

It was reported in 1833 that fairs were held annually on 12 May, 3 September and 7 November.

The parish of Trefriw was owned for a long period by the Gwydir Estate (although under continuous mortgage), but in 1895–96 most of Llanrhychwyn and Trefriw were sold off by the ruling Barons Willoughby de Eresby and the Earls of Ancaster.

==== The Quay ====
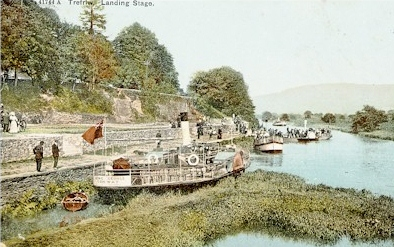
An old postcard (dated 1905) showing steamers at Trefriw Quay

At the start of the 19th century, boats of around 5 tons could only reach Trefriw quay at or near high tides. It is not known when the first quay was built, but a storehouse existed there in 1754. The quay, which belonged to the Gwydir Estate and was ruled by a resident harbourmaster, was later extended (the present structure dates from about 1811–12), and became of great significance to Trefriw, its growth, and subsequent history. Subsequent rock blasting in the 19th century downstream at Tal-y-cafn, and dredging, enabled river boats of 50 tons and seagoing ships of 100 tons to reach Trefriw. The quays were sited opposite the Bellevue Hotel, now the Princes Arms Hotel, and remains can still be seen, best viewed from the walks on 'the Cob'.

From the quay was shipped out grain, wool, hide, oak, timber and metals from the mines of the Gwydir Forest. A considerable amount of slate was also shipped, this coming not just from Llnrhychwyn and Crafnant Quarries, but from as far away as Cwm Penmachno, where Penmachno, Rhiwbach and Blaen y Cwm quarries were major suppliers. However, wharfage prices were high at Trefriw (being non-Gwydir), and even before the opening of the Rhiwbach Tramway in 1863 (which linked to the Festiniog Railway at Blaenau Ffestiniog) it was decided that it was preferable (though less easy) to cart slate via Cwm Teigl down to the quays on the river Dwyryd, below Maentwrog. As a consequence slate shipments from Trefriw quay fell dramatically. (Between 1818 and 1835 slate had accounted for 70% of Trefriw's total exports; between 1857 and 1877 this fell to 20%.) However, not all the trade from the quay was material heading down-river—commodities such as food, wine (ordered by the region's gentry), coal and fertilizers (especially lime) were brought in.

Bangor University Archives holds some "Trefriw Port Books", which provide details of vessels, tonnages, masters, origins, destinations, cargoes by weight and fees. Two original manuscript volumes range in date from 3 April 1826 - 26 December 1835 and 1835–47.

In the early 19th century up to 450 vessels traded from the quay, to places such as Liverpool and Dublin. Trade totalled 1,548 tons in 1818, and peaked in 1862 at a total of 16,532 tons, after which the railways contributed to the decline of trade via the quays. In 1854 the main quay acquired a weighing machine and a crane, and there was a small shipyard in the village.

Sulphur was also shipped from the Cae Coch Sulphur Mine, prior to the construction of the railway line. The mine is discussed in detail in volume 7 of The Mines of The Gwydir Forest, by John Bennett & Robert W. Vernon (Gwydir Mines Publications, 1997). The other six volumes, whilst dealing with the mines beyond Trefriw itself, are also of interest in that these mines also provided much trade for the ships.

There were smaller quays further down the river, with the Gwydir Estate owning Coed Gwydir (for stone) and Cae Coch (sulphur). Below this, other non-Gwydir quays were at the Maenan Abbey, Porth Llwyd (Dolgarrog) and Tal-y-cafn, but Trefriw saw the most trade, by far.

==== The Artists' Colony ====
The latter 19th century saw a number of artists living in Trefriw. The art movement, which had started in Betws-y-coed in the 1850s, popularized by David Cox, saw a movement down the valley following the arrival of the railway in Betws-y-coed. In 1871 William Barker lived in the village, and the 1881 census recorded another 8 artists living in the village, namely John Davies, Ben Fowler, Robert Goody, Julius Hare, Henry Hilton, John Johnson, James Morland and Henry Boberts. Although artists continued to live here until after the turn of the century, like Betws-y-coed it became a victim of its own popularity. The movement therefore again re-established itself, this time at Tal-y-bont and Llanbedr-y-cennin, where its 40 members included those artists from Trefriw. Here in a building they set up an ‘Artists Club’, and its members were a strong influence on the formation of the Royal Cambrian Academy of Art, which moved into Plas Mawr, Conwy in 1886.

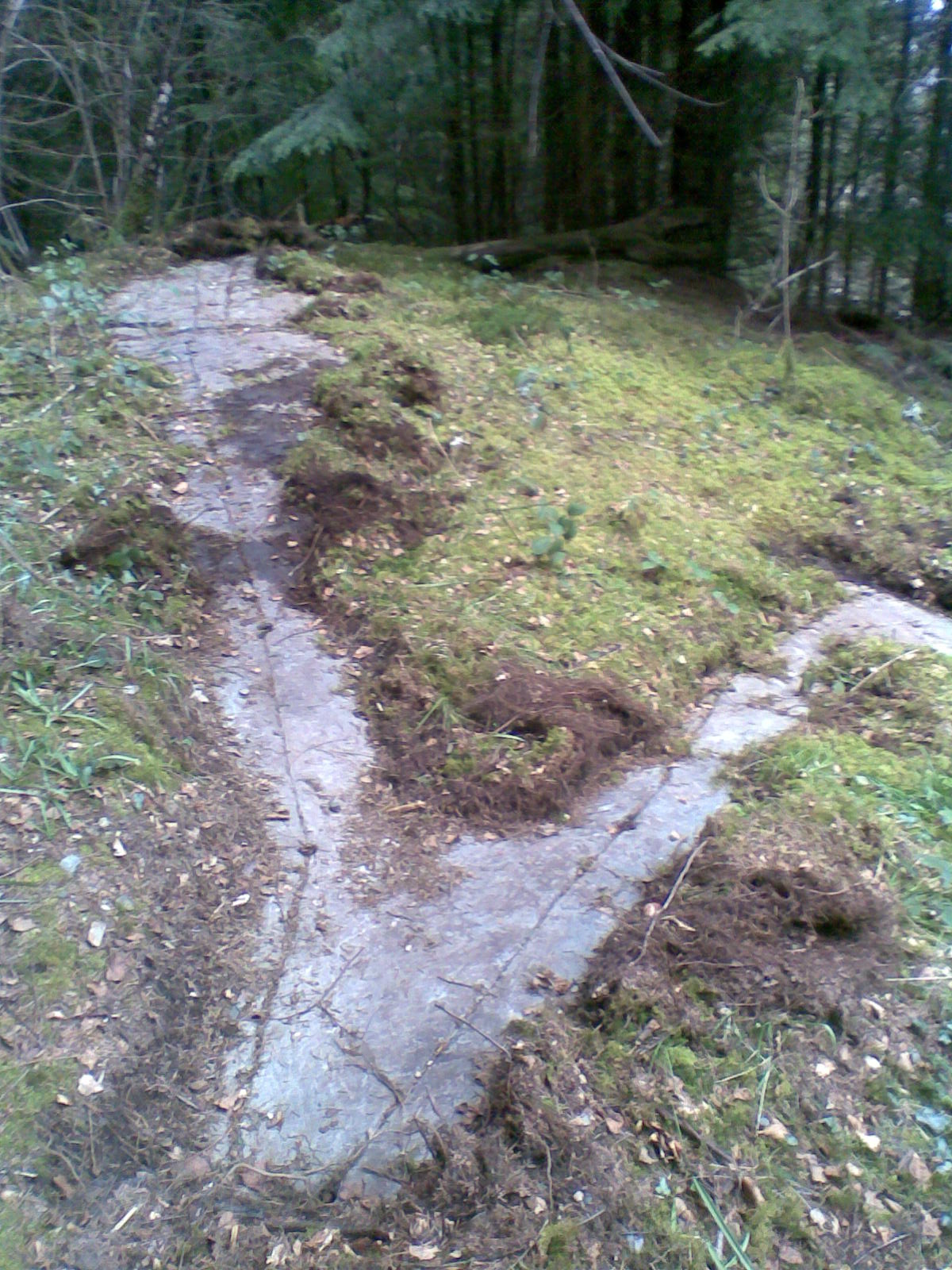
The rock cannon on the hillside above the village now lies in the forest.

==== Cae Robin Rock Cannon ====
Trefriw boasted a rock cannon, originally sited in the open on the hill overlooking Llanrwst, but today it is surrounded by the forest of Coed Creigiau. Comprising 13 holes, each about 80 cm apart, its use in 1863 was reported in the local paper where it is recorded that "Rock and metal cannons were fired in such profusion that about 8cwt of gunpowder was consumed." This was to celebrate the marriage of Albert Edward, Prince of Wales to Princess Alexandra of Denmark on 10 March 1863. It was also fired in 1872 following the marriage of Peter Lewis, a local timber merchant, to Miss Williams; the Llangollen Advertiser reported that “one of the grandest balls we have ever witnessed” was held at the Belle Vue Hotel, and "the firing of [rock] cannon resounded through the valley like thunder". It is also likely that the Trefriw cannon was the one reported in May 1877 when Lord Avebury visited Gwydir Castle, and "as soon as he approached the Castle, by road, the firing of cannon commenced, and continued for some time".

==== The Spa ====
In 1833 the old Roman mineral water caves (believed to have been discovered by soldiers of the XXth Roman Legion) were excavated in an attempt to attract people to them. In 1863 Lord Willoughby de Eresby built a small bath-house, replaced a decade later by the current building. Large numbers of people came, no doubt aided by national advertising, and the declaration by Dr. Hayward, a fashionable medical specialist from Liverpool, that this was "Probably the best spa in the United Kingdom". Baddeley's guidebook notes contains the quote - "inconceivably nasty and correspondingly efficaceous". In more recent times clinical trials have proven that the Spa water is a medically effective iron supplement.

In 2003, Nelsons purchased the Spa and the rights to the Spatone mineral water produced there. Today Spatone is sold around the world, with all packaging and manufacture on site in Trefriw. For over a century the Spa was open as a tourist attraction, but in 2011 it was closed to the public, and serves today only as a commercial business.

=== Victorian/Edwardian heyday ===
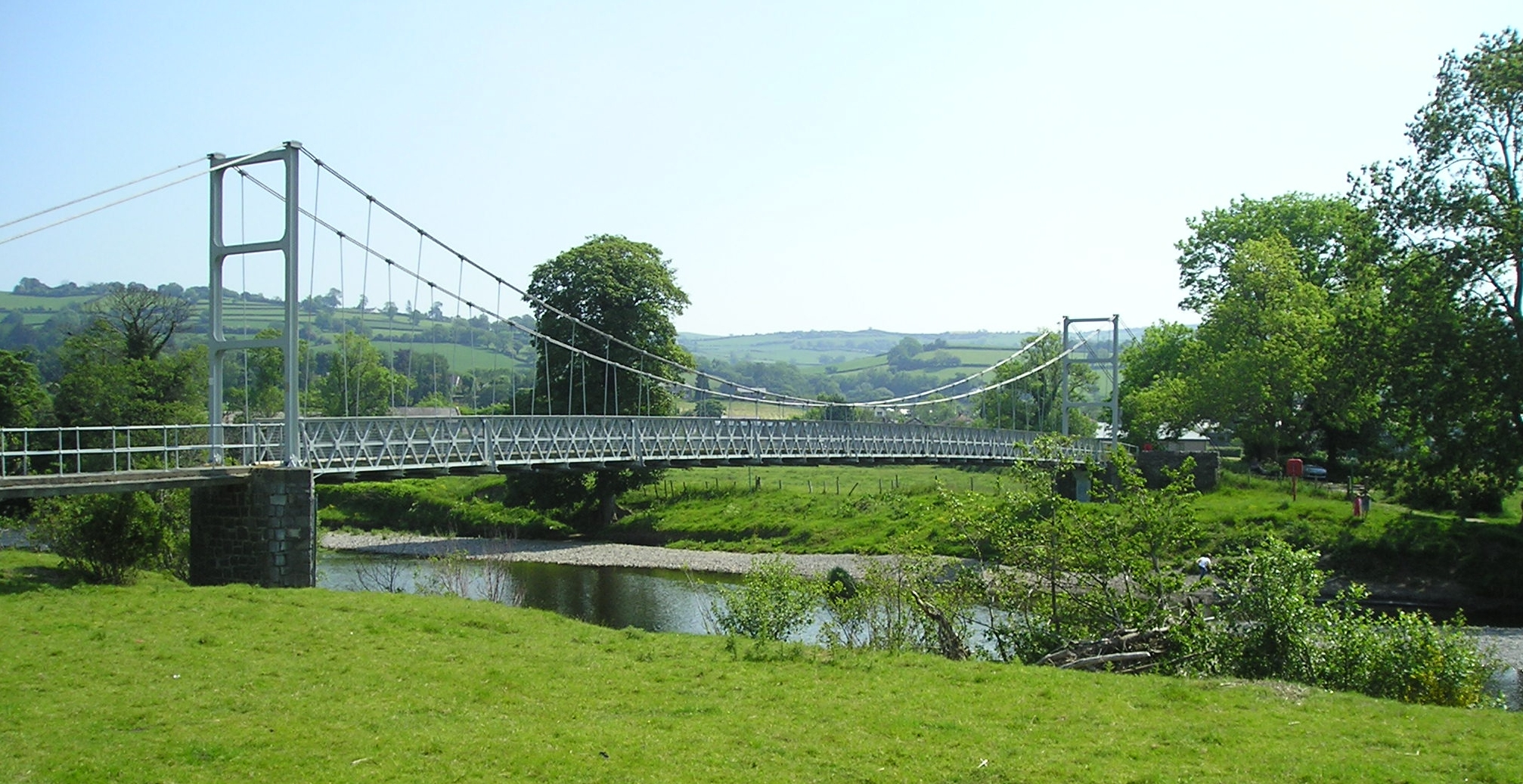
The "Gower" footbridge and path linking Trefriw with North Llanrwst station

The village was at its heyday in the early part of the 20th century, visitors arriving by both train and steamer. Many visitors to the Spa arrived by train to Llanrwst station, which opened in the 1860s. From here transport was provided, over Gower's bridge, named after the Revd John Gower, rector of Trefriw, who came to Trefriw in 1869 (from Queen's College, Birmingham), and lived in the grand rectory, built in 1842, and located up School Bank Hill. There was a toll of 1d for pedestrians and 2d for cyclists, this money being used to finance the building of the road. The original toll bridge had about 10 wooden piers, and was wide enough to take a horse and carriage. It was demolished in the 1940s after the council, having bought the road, agreed to spend £1,500 on the present suspension bridge. The original toll house, Gower's House, was also demolished, but remains of its site can still be seen.

The railway Gower built the road and the bridge to North Llanrwst railway station after the plan to run the railway line down the western (Trefriw) side of the valley was dropped. The line was authorised in 1860 and opened in 1863. The station was originally known as "Llanrwst & Trefriw", and for over 100 years was Llanrwst's only station.

Paddle steamers Until 1939 the quay was used by paddle steamers which brought tourists up the river from Conwy, hugely swelling the village's population by day. A regular service for passengers was started in 1847 by the St. George Steam Packet Company. St. Winifred was the first paddle steamer, joined in c. 1880 by the St. George, before being replaced a decade later by the New St. George (it later changing its name to Prince George). Around 1900 Queen of the Conway arrived, to be followed in 1903 by the Trefriw Belle, a screw-steamer, and in 1907 by the King George, another paddler. The Jubilee, a second propeller-driven steamer, arrived the following year from work on the Mawddach estuary. In all, therefore, the start of the 20th century saw some half-dozen steamers plying the route, and carrying a total of over 1,000 passengers. Fares were 1/6 (7½p) single or 2/6 return (12½p). The journey from Conwy took 90 minutes, and passengers would be given this same amount of time in the village before embarking on the return trip.

The steamers were laid up in World War II, and this spelled the end of the cruises, other than a brief couple of seasons in the 1950s when motor boats were used—at 5/- (25p) return. The steamers were beached upstream of Conway bridges, and eventually scrapped. Their passage up the river had necessitated regular river-dredging, which has no longer been continued.

The Fairy Falls

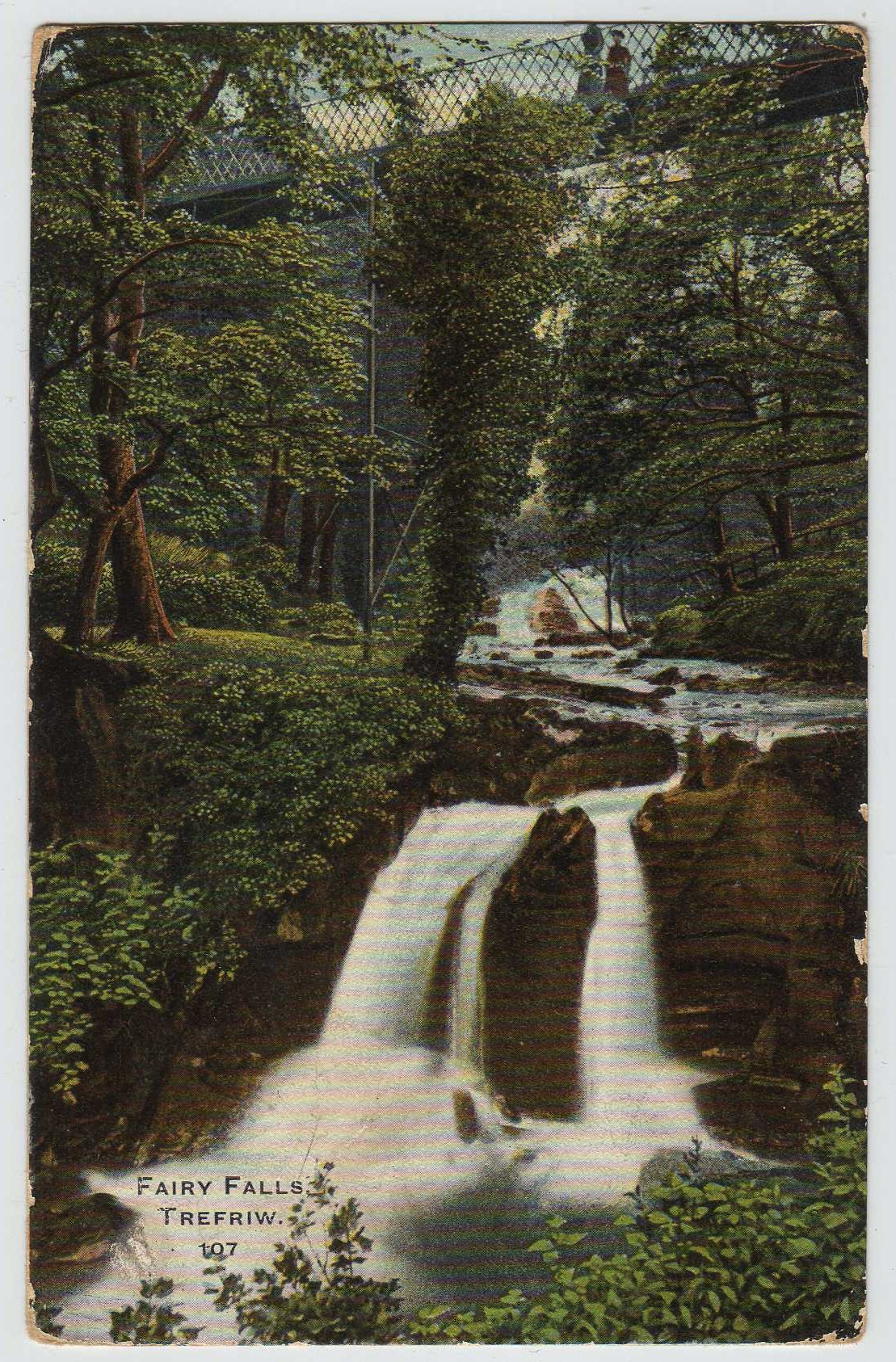
An old postcard showing the Fairy Falls (1903)

The Fairy Falls, a waterfall on the river Crafnant, was a popular visiting place. Downstream of the main falls are a number of further, lesser, falls, which old postcards also call the "Fairy Falls". Along this lower section of river the water once turned a number of waterwheels which powered various mills. The whole area of this series of falls—from the main falls through the lesser falls downstream—was known as "Fairy Glen", and was altogether more free from trees and vegetation than it is today. In Edwardian times there was a proper path alongside the river Crafnant, and a popular stroll was to walk from the banks of the river Crafnant, up through the well-known Fairy Glen, and on beside the river Crafnant up towards Llyn Crafnant.

Recreation The village once had a 9-hole golf course, this lying on land between Cowlyd Road and Crafnant Road, on the slopes uphill of the cemetery. It was laid out in 1893 (instituted in 1897) on land owned by Lord Ancaster (who owned much land in the area) by Thomas Dutton (of the Belle View Hotel), who naturally gave discounts to hotel residents. An advertisement of 1903 quotes prices of 2/- (10p) a day or 5/- (25p) a week. In 1894 Fred Collins, the professional golfer from Llandudno, who later laid out Prestatyn golf course, made his first public appearance here. The professionals at the club were William Buckle (1897/8), Ben Owen (1901–1905) and P. McLeod (1905–1907). In 1914 the secretary of the club was C. C. Morris of Rose Hill, Trefriw. The course was never really successful, and after closure (by 1918) the clubhouse was transferred to the quay. For more on the golf club

Trefriw Recreation Ground was opened in 1889 and in time came to boast croquet lawns, tennis courts, a bowling green and a paddling pool (filled in after it kept flooding), it was also the location for the seasonal Trefriw Open tennis tournament with John Boucher, and Ruth Dyas among the winners of the event. Trefriw annually hosted the North Wales Croquet Championship, and a tennis tournament. There also used to be an annual carnival, and sheepdog trials (in the 1920s).

=== 20th century onwards ===
Trefriw viewed from the Cob

In the 20th century the village was set to be further boosted by the building of a railway from Conwy (plans exist dated 1908), the line coming via Rowen and Tal-y-bont. This was around the time of the growth of Dolgarrog as an electricity generating centre, and the North Wales Power & Traction Co. Ltd, a company which went on to have controlling shares in many of the region's narrow gauge railways, intending to electrify them.

Floods Floods have always been part of Trefriw's history, being located on the edge of the flood plain of Afon Conwy. On various occasions in the 20th century defences have been built and improved, including the partial diverting of the Afon Crafnant, which itself carries a lot of water from the Crafnant catchment area.

Trefriw made national news when, in February 2004, following a period of prolonged rain in the mountain catchment areas of the river Conwy and its tributaries, the village was largely cut off by floods for three days, and some properties on the lower High Street were flooded by three feet of water. The following January saw a repeat occurrence, sections of the Cob again being breached. This second occasion failed to make national news due to simultaneous flooding in other parts of Britain, notably Carlisle.

The Environment Agency have now completed work on the new cob which now runs through Glyn Farm Caravan site and the recreational ground. Both pieces of land have undergone significant changes to accommodate the new cob. This work was undertaken after the environment agency arranged a detailed mapping of the valley, with the aim of moving the cob further back in order to give a wider "channel".

The Environment Agency now constantly monitors water levels in the river Conwy, with a view to giving flood warnings. There are measuring stations at Betws-y-Coed (Cwmlanerch), Llanrwst and Trefriw.

As a result of the floods, Trefriw was one of the locations visited by Prince Charles in July 2004 as part of his annual summer tour of Wales.

A modern tourist destination

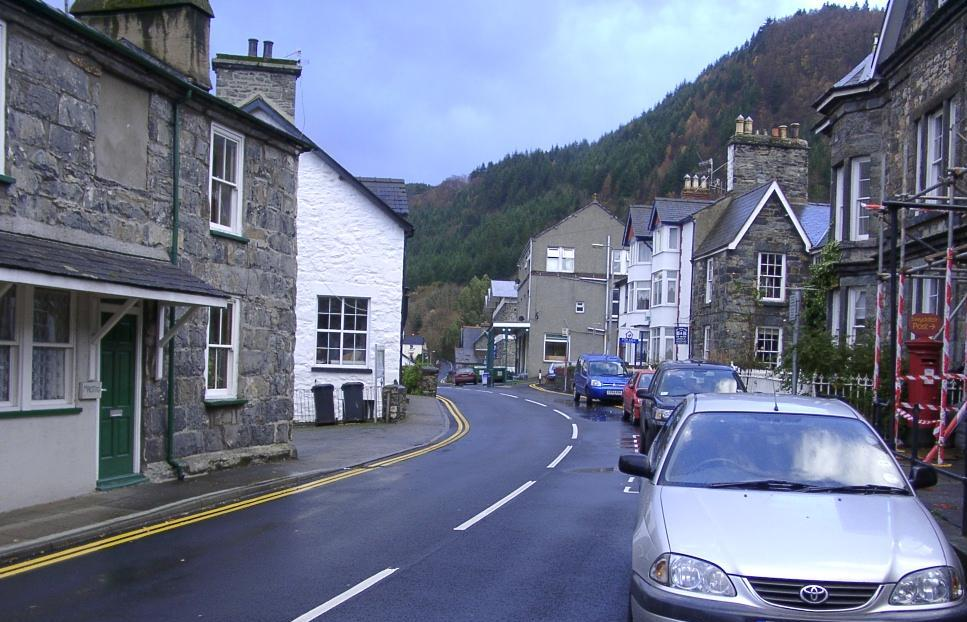
Trefriw High Street today

Trefriw's heyday as a tourist destination may have passed, but it still attracts visitors. By car it is only a 10-minute drive to Betws-y-Coed, and within 30 minutes drivers can reach either the coast or the mountains. The village is set in a landscape of hills, forests and lakes; it has two pubs and a hotel and there is other B&B accommodation locally. Many visitors come to walk in the area, and Llyn Geirionydd and Llyn Crafnant can be easily reached on foot. The latter is very popular, and many would agree that "the (view along Llyn Crafnant) is one of the most breathtaking views in all Snowdonia". (Forest Park guide, 2002). There is a series of walking trails in the area (see the "Trefriw Trails" link below) but many also start here for longer walks into the Gwydir Forest, or the Carneddau mountains, the latter via Llyn Cowlyd which, although less scenic than Crafnant and Geirionydd, has a wild appeal of its own.

Many visitors come to the village to visit the Trefriw Woollen Mills. Trefriw Wells Spa, formerly an attraction for visitors, closed to the public in 2011 in order to increase its production of spa water.

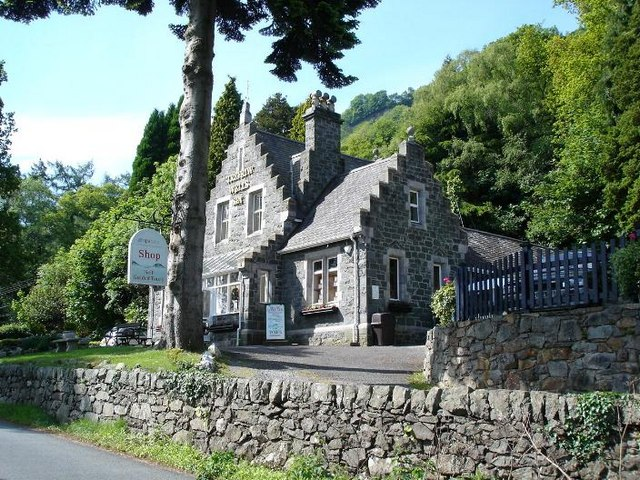
Trefriw Wells Spa

Nearby, on the road to the neighbouring town of Llanrwst lies Gwydir Castle, which is set within a Grade I listed, 10-acre (40,000 m^{2}) garden. Built by the Wynn family c. 1500 (see John Wynn, 1st Baronet), Gwydir is an example of a Tudor courtyard house, incorporating re-used medieval material from the dissolved Abbey of Maenan. Further additions date from c. 1600 and c. 1826. The important 1640s panelled dining room has now been reinstated, following its repatriation from the New York Metropolitan Museum.

Many cyclists come to the area to ride the "Marin Trail", a competition standard route in Gwydir Forest.

The Moel Maelogan wind farm, commissioned in 2003, and located on the top of the ridge on the other side of the valley, is visible to varying degrees from the village.

== Demographics ==
=== Population ===
==== Number ====
Trefriw's population was 1,229 at the 2011 Census. According to the 2021 Census, its population was 1,237.

=== Languages ===
==== Welsh ====
According to the United Kingdom Census 2021, 42.6 per cent of all usual residents aged 3+ in Trefriw can speak Welsh. 57.5 per cent of the population noted that they could speak, read, write or understand Welsh.

The 2011 census noted 45.6 per cent of all usual residents aged 3 years and older in the village could speak Welsh. The 2011 census also noted that 70.2 per cent of all usual residents aged 3+ who were born in Wales could speak Welsh.

=== Identity ===
According to the 2011 Census, 48.3 per cent of the population noted that they had Welsh-only national identity. According to the 2022 Census, 46.0 per cent of the population noted that they had Welsh-only national identity.

=== Country of Birth ===
The 2011 Census noted that 97.9 per cent of the population was born in the United Kingdom. 59.6 per cent of the population was born in Wales and 36.9 per cent of the population born in England.

=== Ethnic Group ===
In 2021, 97.7% of Trefriw's population identified their ethnic group within the high-level "White" category.

== Governance ==
Since 2022 the community of Trefriw has formed part of the Betws-y-Coed and Trefriw electoral ward and has been represented on Conwy Council by Plaid Cymru councillor Elizabeth Roberts. The village also has a Community Council, currently chaired by councillor Kim Ellis.

== Buildings of note ==
=== Churches ===
St Mary's Church

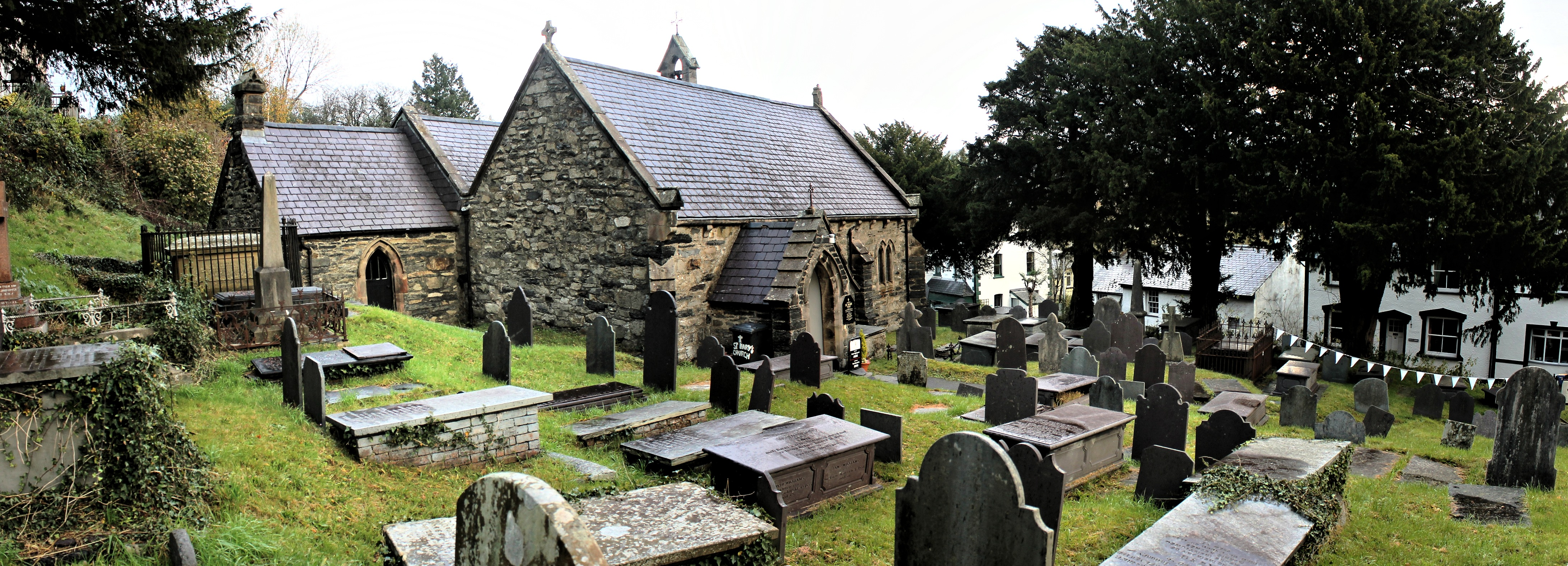
St Mary's Church

None of the original church built by Llywelyn in the 13th century remains, except possibly for part of the wall of the south aisle, the result of heavy remodelling in the 15th and 16th centuries, and again in the 19th century. A 17th-century altar remains in the church, although the one used is a larger Victorian example. The carved hexagonal pulpit dates from 1633, and the church possesses a “Breeches” Bible of 1589, (another term for the Geneva Bible of 1560). There is also a silver chalice inscribed “the cuppe of Trefriw, 1701”, and registers date from 1594.

First Independent Chapel Cwmanog is a 17th-century farmhouse which, as the home of Jane Thomas, became the first meeting place of local Nonconformists. They then built a chapel, apparently made to look like a normal house in order to avoid offence to non-Independents. The current building was erected in 1862, but was replaced as a place of worship in 1881 by the Ebenezer chapel. The building then became a venue for concerts, shows, and lectures, and is today's Village Hall.

Ebenezer Chapel The Ebenezer Chapel (at the bottom of Crafnant Road) was designed by a Liverpool architect, and built in 1881 by William Evans, of Betws-y-Coed, at a cost of £1,646. In November 2016 the chapel was sold at auction, and was described by the auctioneer as ripe for conversion to a dwelling.

The Peniel Chapels The old Peniel chapel (up School Bank Road) was built in Victorian times but closed in August 1910 when it became too small for its congregation. The new Peniel Chapel seated 550 people, with an attached schoolroom capable of holding 225 more. It was designed by a company from Shrewsbury, and is somewhat reminiscent of a late-Gothic style. Its organ was water-powered.

Catholic Church The original Catholic church was replaced by a modern Catholic church on much the same site on Top Road. This is now a private residence.

=== Pubs and hotels ===
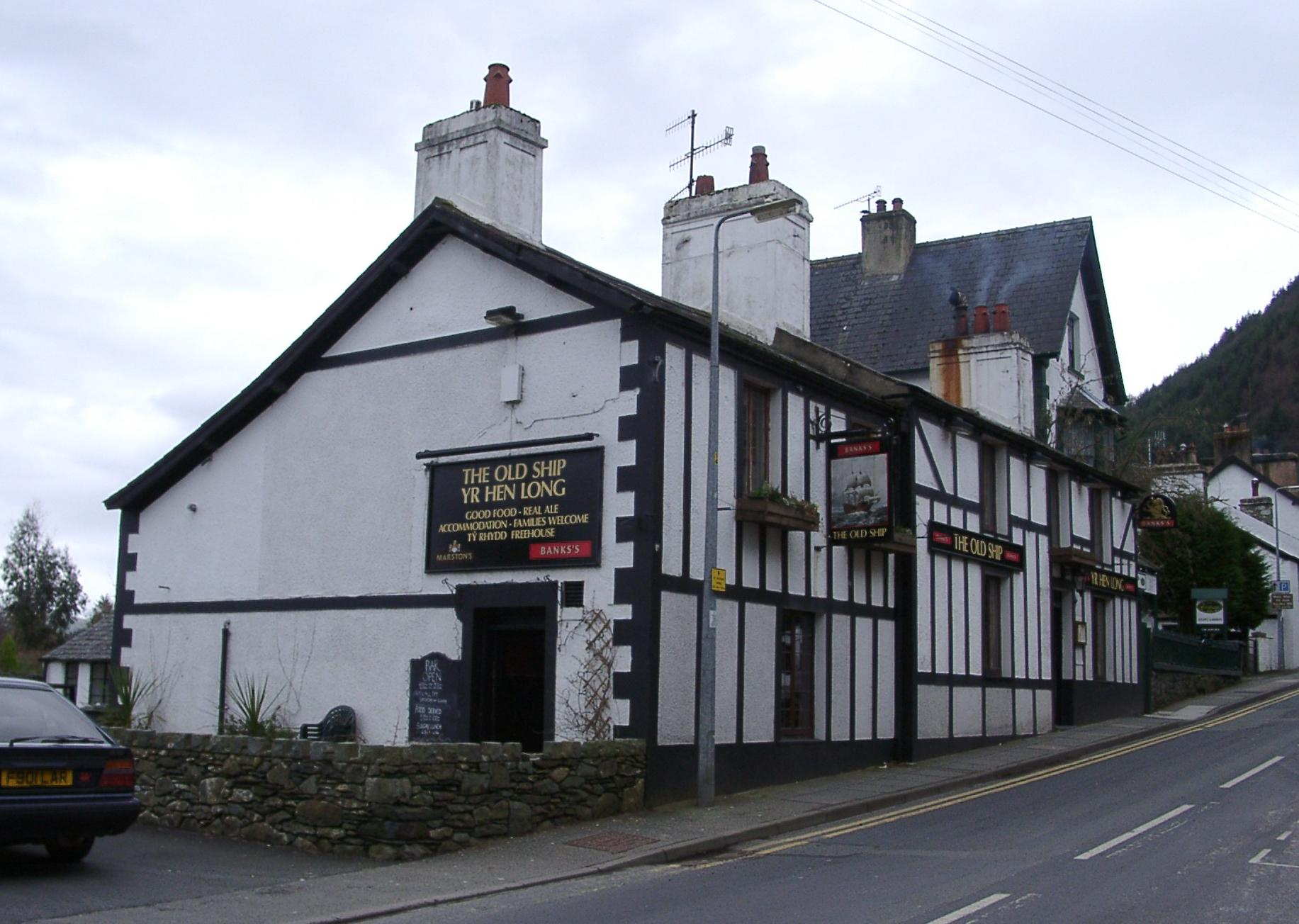
Yr Hen Long / The Old Ship, one of Trefriw's pubs

The Princes Arms Hotel started life as the Belle Vue Hotel, which was built about 1846. Run in its early days by James Long, in its heyday it was run by the Dutton family (in conjunction with the Castle Hotel, Conwy). Trade was very brisk in the era of the steamers, and many passengers called in for a meal, where David Francis, the blind harpist, often played. In 1968 the hotel became the Prince's Hotel, and thence the Prince's Arms Hotel. In 1930 The Belle View Spa rooms were opened, so that tourists could sample the Spa waters in the village itself, the Spa being a mile to the north.

The Old Ship public house (Yr Hen Long) recalls the village's trading history.

The Fairy Falls public house was originally named the Geirionnydd Vaults, becoming the Geirionnydd Hotel around the turn of the 20th century. The erection of the adjacent motel-style lodge increased accommodation considerably. The pub is reputedly haunted by two ghosts, named John Lucas and Lucy, who have been seen by the current landlord.

The village once had other public houses—The Union Inn—run by Catherine Owen. This was opposite the present Post Office, and can be distinguished by the blank "window" on the front of the building, which once carried the pub name, which referred to the Llanrwst Union, a union of parishes created under the Poor Law Amendment Act 1834. Today the property is called Maesteg.

The Anchor was located on the main street, near the village school.

=== Other notable buildings and locations ===
The oldest existing house in Trefriw is believed to be Hafod Country House, which has been confirmed to be of Medieval origin by Neil Johnstone, an archaeologist employed by Menter Môn. It was built as a hall house, with a solar and a tower which followed a pattern used in the castles of the 13th century Princes of Gwynedd. Due to the numerous changes made over time, the oldest surviving timbers appear to date from a time when the hall had two further floors added. A three-floor construction is unprecedented in Welsh rural houses of the time, but is a pattern employed in some Cistercian granges. The Cistercian monks at Maenan had extensive land holdings in the area. The adjoining cottage, Tan-y-Celyn (Under the Holly), appears to have been built as a gatehouse, around the time of the dissolution of the monasteries. The next oldest house in the village is reputed to be Gwyndy Cottage, parts of which date back to the 16th century.

"Tan yr Yw" (Under the Yews) was the home of Dafydd Jones, an 18th-century poet and printer (See "Famous inhabitants"). The yews referred to are those in the churchyard opposite, and the house is now a Grade II listed building.

Tyddyn Wilym was the home of Gwilym Cowlyd, the bard, born in 1828. Gwilym believed that the house was also the former birthplace of Dr Thomas Wiliems, who allegedly played a part in foiling the Gunpowder Plot. (See "Famous Inhabitants").

"Plas Cae Coch" "(Red Field Hall)" dates from the mid-1800s. In 1841 it was the home of Robert and Elizabeth Hill. The Hill family were the operators of the Cae Coch Sulpher Mine. The mine is situated in the Gwydyr Forest, to the rear of the property. Material from the mine was shipped from a nearby wharf on the River Conwy to the Thompson and Hill Chemical works in Liverpool.(See "History 1.4"). Plas Cae Coch and the Hill family are referred to in Volume 7 of The Mines of The Gwydir Forest, by John Bennett & Robert W. Vernon (Gwydir Mines Publications, 1997).

In his book Hanes Trefriw (1879), Morris Jones writes brief chapters on the following properties, which he considers of significance, either historical, or through connection with their inhabitants—(y) Tŷ Newydd, (y) Pandy, (y) Tŷ Isaf, Tan yr Yw, Bryn Pyll, (y) Tŷ Uchaf, Gwiga (the only thatched property), (y) Pandy Uchaf, Bron Derw and Crafnant House.

The village school was built in 1842 by Lord Willoughby d'Eresby, who owned land and mines in the nearby Gwydir Forest.

Glanrafon stores was built at the end of the 19th century, replacing some former cottages. The top floors once operated as the Glanrafon Private Hotel and Boarding House.

The car park opposite the woollen mills, along with the Recreation grounds, were given as a gift to the villagers. This car park is called "The Singrug", derived from "Eisingrug" (eisin + crug meaning heap/pile of husks). This name is far from unique in Wales, and refers to the fact that winnowing must at one time have been undertaken here.

=== Listed buildings ===
The following buildings in and around Trefriw are on the register of listed buildings:

Grade I Listed Buildings
Gwydir Castle (including gatehouse)
Gwydir Uchaf Chapel
Llanrhychwyn Church
Gwydir Castle – terrace arch and associated garden walls

Grade II Listed Buildings		
Bron Edda	Cwmannog – barn to the W of	Cwmannog – chaff mill and carthouse
Cwmannog Farmhouse	Ffynnon Gowper	Glan-y-Ddol
Gwydir Castle – former coachhouse, incl. wall & entrance arch to E	Gwydir Castle – knot-garden arch, with associated courtyard walls	Gwydir Uchaf
Gwydir Castle – raised walk	Gwydir Cottage	Llys Llewelyn
Llanrhychwyn Church – lychgate	Milestone (on B5106)	Milestone (on B5106)
Nant Cottage	Parish Church of St. Mary (Grade II*)	Peniel Welsh Presbyterian Chapel
Plas Coch	Pont-y-Pandy	Pont Dolgarrog
Pont Hafod Arthen (near Crafnant)	Pont Trefriw	Taliesin Monument (Geirionydd)
Tan-y-Celyn	Tan-yr-Yw	The Old Rectory
Trefriw Hall	Trefriw Wells – old Bath House	Tyn-y-Coed

=== Listed Ancient Monuments ===
Additionally, the following local features are listed by Cadw as Ancient Monuments:

Ancient Monuments
Cefn Cyfarwydd Cairn
Ffridd Uchaf Deserted Rural Settlement
Hut Settlement West of Allt Goch (on Cefn Cyfarwydd)
Klondyke Lead Mill
Hafna Lead Mine Mill
Vale of Conwy Lead Mine

== Commerce ==
Trefriw today has just two shops: the post office/general store and butchers/grocers. There is also the Woollen mill which has a shop selling the goods made on site. However, in its heyday, with up to 1,000 visitors arriving daily, there were naturally many more. These were virtually all located on the main street, and a number of properties can today clearly be seen to have been former shops.

Trefriw's most famous shop was perhaps that run by Richard Thomas Ellis. Located in what is currently the Post Office, this emporium sold almost everything, including even dynamite. Ellis also arranged funerals. An advert of 1889 advertised "A splendid assortment of useful presents for visitors".

Other shops which have long disappeared include: a post office (by Chandlers yard), a shoe shop (currently the butchers), two butcher's shops (one at Bryn Neuadd, which has also been a craft shop, the other opposite the mill), a cycle shop (lower main street), a bank (the middle shop in Glanrafon parade), a cake shop/bakers (opposite the current Post Office), a cobblers and confectionery shop (where the woollen mill is now), a sweet shop (opposite the school), a craft shop (opposite the Fairy Falls), a chemist, a taxi/garage business (later Chandlers boatyard), Neuadd cafe (next to the village hall), a chip shop (near The Old Ship pub) and a grocers (behind the current Post Office).

There was formerly a large abattoir behind the public toilets.

== Name origins and population ==
The name 'Trefriw' is variously attributed to 'tref' + 'rhiw' (farm/homestead + hill) or to 'tref' + 'briw' (a wound, i.e. a reference to the healing waters of the Spa). Given the nature of Welsh consonant mutation, both of these are feasible - Tref + riw (soft mutation of rhiw, as the second part of a compound word) or Tre' + friw (mutation of briw).

The information board in the village opts for the meaning deriving from the healing waters. However, D. Geraint Lewis, who has done much research into place names, concludes that the meaning is "homestead on the hill".

The following explanation is also given:

"Trefriw means the town of the slope or hillside, and stands for Tref y Riw, not tref y Rhiw, which would have yielded Treffriw, for there is a tendency in Gwynedd to make the mutation after the definite article conform to the general rule, and to say y law, 'the hand,' and y raw, 'the spade,' instead of what would be in books—y llaw and y rhaw."

The word 'tref' historically meant 'farm/homestead'. Today it means 'town'. The definition of the word 'town' has altered over the centuries. Certainly Trefriw, in its heyday, was undeniably a town. Today it would be described as a large village.

Over the centuries the spelling of the name Trefriw has seen numerous versions. As has been mentioned above, Hanes Trefriw records that Llywelyn named the new parish "Tref Rhiw Las". A document of 1254AD refers to the place as Treffruu. and a number of documents from the 16th century refer to Treverewe, Treffrewe, Treverow and Treffrew (as well as to Trefriw), with Trefriew appearing on a document of 1795.

By 1801 the village had a population of 301, according to the "Topographical Dictionary of the Dominion of Wales" (1811). By 1851 the population had risen to 428. The 1991 Census records a population of 1,286, 54.9% of whom could speak Welsh. The 2001 Census records an increased population as 1,338, there being some 565 residences within the Ward, and reports that exactly half of the population is Welsh speaking.

== Famous inhabitants ==
- Thomas Wiliems (1545 or 1546–1620?). Referred to above in connection with the Gunpowder Plot.
- Evan Evans ("Ieuan Glan Geirionydd") was born in Trefriw in 1795, the son of a former shipwright. He was of Nonconformist parentage, and his parents are credited with founding the Calvinistic Methodist movement in the area. He started life as a schoolmaster, but attracted attention by his successes in poetry at various Eisteddfodau, his early imagination being charmed by the picturesque surroundings of his home area. He subsequently decided to move into the church, and was ordained in 1826. He was a hymn writer, but suffered from bad health—possibly a reason why his hymns, most in the form of prayers, are considered rather sad and deep. He held successively the curacies of Christleton and Ince, in Cheshire. Ill-health compelled him to leave Ince, and he spent some time in retirement among his beloved hills in Trefriw. When he had partially recovered, he was appointed to the curacy of Rhyl. He died on 21 January 1855, and is buried in the village cemetery. His poetical works were published under the title of Geirionydd.
- Dafydd Jones (1703–85) was a poet who wrote most of his works between 1750 and 1780. He lived at Tan yr yw in the village, as referred to above, and sometimes wrote under the name of Dewi Fardd. He progressed from publishing his own work to setting up on his own as a printer—some say that this was the first printing press in Wales. Some sources refer to Dafydd Jones as the Anglicised form "David Jones". The first Welsh language publication of a purely political nature was a translation by him of a pamphlet on the American dispute.
- Gwilym Cowlyd, a native of Trefriw, was one of the most colourful figures in Welsh culture, and one who was very fond of the Cerdd Dant Festival. William John Roberts (1828–1904) was his real name, and the one he used in his day job as a printer and bookseller. However, he had a bee in his bonnet when it came to the National Eisteddfod and he would assume the bardic name of Gwilym Cowlyd when levelling severe criticism at the Gorsedd for being too Anglicised. Eventually, in 1865, he founded a separate festival to rival the big National Eisteddfod. He called it Arwest Glan Geirionydd ("Music Festival on the Banks of the Lake Geirionydd"), and the meeting point was the Taliesin Memorial which now overlooks the lake.

A postcard of Mary Owen, taken in the year she died. It reads "The Oldest Subject in Great Britain, Mary Owen, born at Trefriw in 1803, is 108 years old."

- Mary Owen was born in Trefriw in 1803, and lived to the age of 108. She moved away to live at Fron Olew, Mynydd Llwydiarth, Pentraeth, overlooking Red Wharf Bay on Anglesey. By May 1911 she broke the record to become the oldest person to live in Wales, indeed in Britain. She died in 1911 and was buried in the graveyard at Pentraeth.
- In 1831 James Hughes was born in the village, and lived at Ysgubor Gerrig. Proficient on the harp, violin and flute, he became a harp-maker of renown. He died in Manchester in 1878 and is buried in the village churchyard.
- T. R. Williams y Ffatri was famous throughout the land as a festival conductor. He composed tunes and anthems, and four of them are in the Independent Hymnbook. He was organist in the Ebenezer Church and a deacon for 15 years. He died in 1922 and there is a stained-glass window there to commemorate him.
- William Jones, poet, was born in Trefriw in 1896, living at Tan y Coed. The son of the Congregational minister in the village, he studied at the University College of North Wales and became a Congregational minister himself before changing denomination and joining the Calvinistic Methodists. He lived and worked in Tremadog. He published two collections of poetry, Adar Rhiannon a Cherddi Eraill in 1947 and Sonedau a Thelynegion in 1950. As a poet and a person, he has been compared to R. Williams-Parry, who was a great friend of his. He died in 1961.
- Dafydd Parri, author of the Welsh children's series Cyfres y Llewod, lived at Plas Gwyn in Trefriw. His children, who include Eisteddfod-winning poet Myrddin ap Dafydd and broadcaster/journalist Iolo ap Dafydd also grew up in the village.
- Kate Roberts, the author, was first cousin to Hugh Griffith Roberts, who lived at Ffynnon Bach in Trefriw.
- Richard Owen Roberts, the father of Gwilym Roberts the story-teller, was born in Llanrhychwyn.
- Dylan Cernyw, Welsh harpist and three-time Eisteddfod winner (1989, 1991 & 1994), was a former tenant of the Fairy Falls pub.
- Although not a resident, Alfred Bestall, author and illustrator of the Rupert Bear stories, holidayed in Trefriw in 1912 and 1913. It was at this time that he first visited Beddgelert, where he subsequently bought a house, and which provided much of the inspiration for his illustrations.
- Allan Barham is a former radio and television reporter, working with BBC Wales and the BBC World Service for 32 years. He lived at Winfield from 1958 to 1997 and for 10 years was chairman of the Trefriw and Llanrhychwyn community council. Perhaps best known among his books was Tales Of The Old Waterloo, which was serialised by the BBC.

== Healthiest place in Wales? ==
In his book Hanes Trefriw (1879), Morris Jones writes (translated from the Welsh):

Regarding the village itself, its position is such that germs cannot live in it—every part of it is on a self-purifying slope—its pure and balmy air, and its beautiful aspect, it receives the healthiest greetings of the morning sun, so that it fully justifies its title—the healthiest place in Wales.

Further credence was given to this belief when it became known that Mary Owen, Britain's oldest woman (see above), was born in Trefriw.

== Fairies ==
Trefriw's links with fairies are noted in the name of the main waterfalls in the village—The Fairy Falls, which is also the name of one of the pubs (previously called The Geirionydd).

In 1880 Wirt Sikes published his book British Goblins—Welsh Folk-lore, Fairy Mythology, Legends and Traditions, from which comes the following passage:

In the course of the summer of 1882 I was a good deal in Wales, especially Carnarvonshire, and I made notes of a great many scraps of legends about the fairies, and other bits of folklore. I will now string some of them together as I found them. I began at Trefriw in Nant Conwy, where I came across an old man, born and bred there, called Morris Hughes. He appears to be about seventy years of age: he formerly worked as a slater, but now he lives at Llanrwst, and tries to earn a livelihood by angling. He told me that fairies came a long while ago to Cowlyd Farm, near Cowlyd Lake, with a baby to dress, and asked to be admitted into the house, saying that they would pay well for it. Their request was granted, and they used to leave money behind them. One day the servant girl accidentally found they had also left some stuff they were in the habit of using in washing their children. She examined it, and, one of her eyes happening to itch, she rubbed it with the finger that had touched the stuff; so when she went to Llanrwst Fair she saw the same fairy folks there stealing cakes from a standing, and asked them why they did that. They inquired with what eye she saw them: she put her hand to the eye, and one of the fairies quickly rubbed it, so that she never saw any more of them. They were also very fond of bringing their children to be dressed in the houses between Trefriw and Llanrwst; and on the flat land bordering on the Conwy they used to dance, frolic, and sing every moonlight night. Evan Thomas of Sgubor Gerrig used to have money from them. He has been dead, Morris Hughes said, over sixty years: he had on his land a sort of cowhouse where the fairies had shelter, and hence the pay.

== In literature ==
In 1879 Morris Jones wrote Hanes Trefriw, fel y bu ac fel y mae, Disgrifiad Cryno o'r Ardal a'r Trigolion (A history of Trefriw, then and now, a short description of the area and its inhabitants). Published by W. J. Roberts, Heol Watling, Llanrwst. This book is in Welsh.

In 1993 Gomer Press published a short historical novel for children by Gweneth Lilly, entitled Treason at Trefriw. (see the reference above)

In fiction, Trefriw was the birthplace of Brother Cadfael, the fictional detective in a series of murder mysteries by the late Edith Pargeter writing under the name "Ellis Peters". His full name was Cadfael ap (son of) Meilyr ap Dafydd and he was born around 1080 to a villein (serf) family. The stories are set between about 1135 and about 1145, during the civil war between the forces of King Stephen and Empress Maud.

The house called "Y Wern" (at the foot of Llanrhychwyn hill) features in the Welsh novel Os Dianc Rhai (by Martin Davis, published by Y Lolfa, 2003). This story is set in the mid-1930s and the Second World War.

== In the record books ==
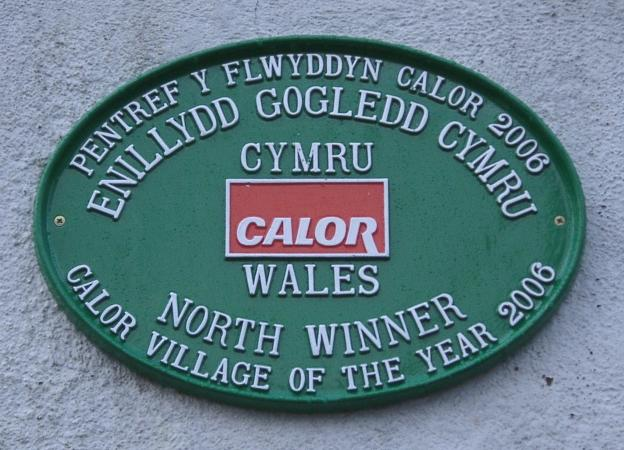
The plaque celebrating Trefriw's success

In 2006 Trefriw won the award for North Wales Calor Village of the Year.

The World's Largest Garden Hedge Maze is currently at "Garden Art", near Dolgarrog. Covering over 2 acres (8,100 m^{2}), this beats the current record previously held by the Marquis of Bath at Longleat. The maze was designed by Giovanni Angelo Jacovelli with assistance from respected Australian artist Bob Haberfield.

Trefriw is in the record books for a record boomerang throw. Englishman Andrew Furniss set the British MTA Unlimited record with 75.41 secs. in the Trefriw Festival (UK, August 2001).

== Quotes ==
Over the years, the following quotes have been made about Trefriw:

Trefriw is a large village, pleasantly situated under the tree-clad hills on the Western side of the Conwy River .... It is in the midst of romantic scenery and is a favourite resort of those requiring quiet quarters ....

— Ward Lock's Red Guide, 1975

The village itself .... is seen to greater advantage from the eastern side of the valley ... due chiefly to the graceful curve of the Crafnant Valley, which forms a charming background to the picture.

— Baddeley,"North Wales", 1950s

(Trefriw is a) genteel resort for discerning sybarites.

— a Victorian guidebook

Trefriw is a picturesque little village umbrageous with shade and intricate with sylvan labyrinth, an ideal retreat from the din and bustle of commercial avocation.

— Letter from a tourist to a local newspaper in 1907

Trefriw remains a resort for the discriminating, little altered from its Edwardian heyday.

— C. Draper, "Walks in the Conwy Valley", 2002

Trefriw is a charmingly situated Caernarvonshire village.

— Baddeley, "North Wales", 1950s

It is a pleasant village along the wooded foothills of the great range rising to the Carneddau.

— M. Fraser, "Gwynedd", 1978

== See also ==
- Nant Conwy RFC - local rugby club
- Klondyke mill
