= Penmachno =

Village in Conwy County Borough, Wales

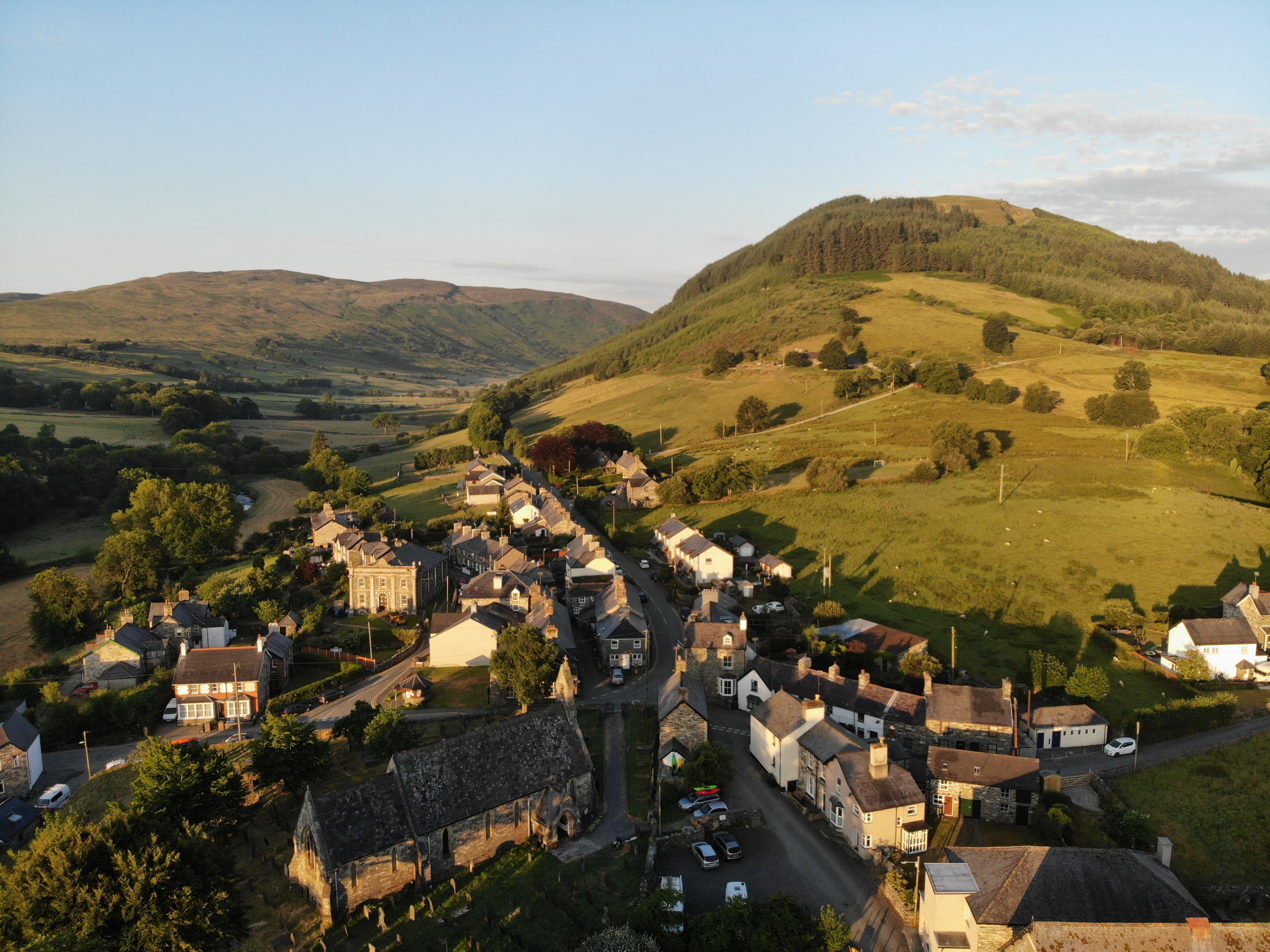
- The village of Penmachno, July 2018.

- Location within Conwy
- OS grid reference: SH790505
- Community: Bro Machno
- Principal area: Conwy
- Preserved county: Clwyd
- Country: Wales
- Sovereign state: United Kingdom
- Post town: BETWS-Y-COED
- Postcode district: LL24
- Dialling code: 01690
- Police: North Wales
- Fire: North Wales
- Ambulance: Welsh
- UK Parliament: Bangor Aberconwy
- Senedd Cymru – Welsh Parliament: Aberconwy

Penmachno is a village in the isolated upland Machno valley, 4 miles (6 km) south of Betws-y-Coed in the county of Conwy, North Wales. The B4406 road runs through part of the village. The village is at the confluence of the Glasgwm and Machno rivers. It has a five-arched, stone bridge dating from 1785. The village has been referred to as Pennant Machno, Llandudclyd and Llan dutchyd in historical sources.

According to the 2011 census, the population of the Bro Machno community (which also includes the village of Cwm Penmachno, about 5 km south west) was 617, of whom 342 (55%) were able to speak Welsh and 214 (34%) had no skills in Welsh.

== Toponymy ==
The village has been referred to as Pennant Machno, Llandudclyd and Llan dutchyd in historical sources. The name derives from the Welsh pen, meaning head, end or promontory and Machno, the name of the valley.

== Notable residents ==
The village was the birthplace of Bishop William Morgan (probably 1545 – 1604), who was born at Tŷ Mawr Wybrnant, near the village. The precise year of his birth is uncertain: it is generally accepted to be 1545, but his memorial in St John's College Chapel, Cambridge suggests 1541.^{Memorial Cambridge} He was one of the leading scholars of his day, having mastered Hebrew in addition to Latin and Greek. He was the first to translate the Bible in its entirety into Welsh. Tŷ Mawr is now a National Trust property open to the public and contains a Bible museum.

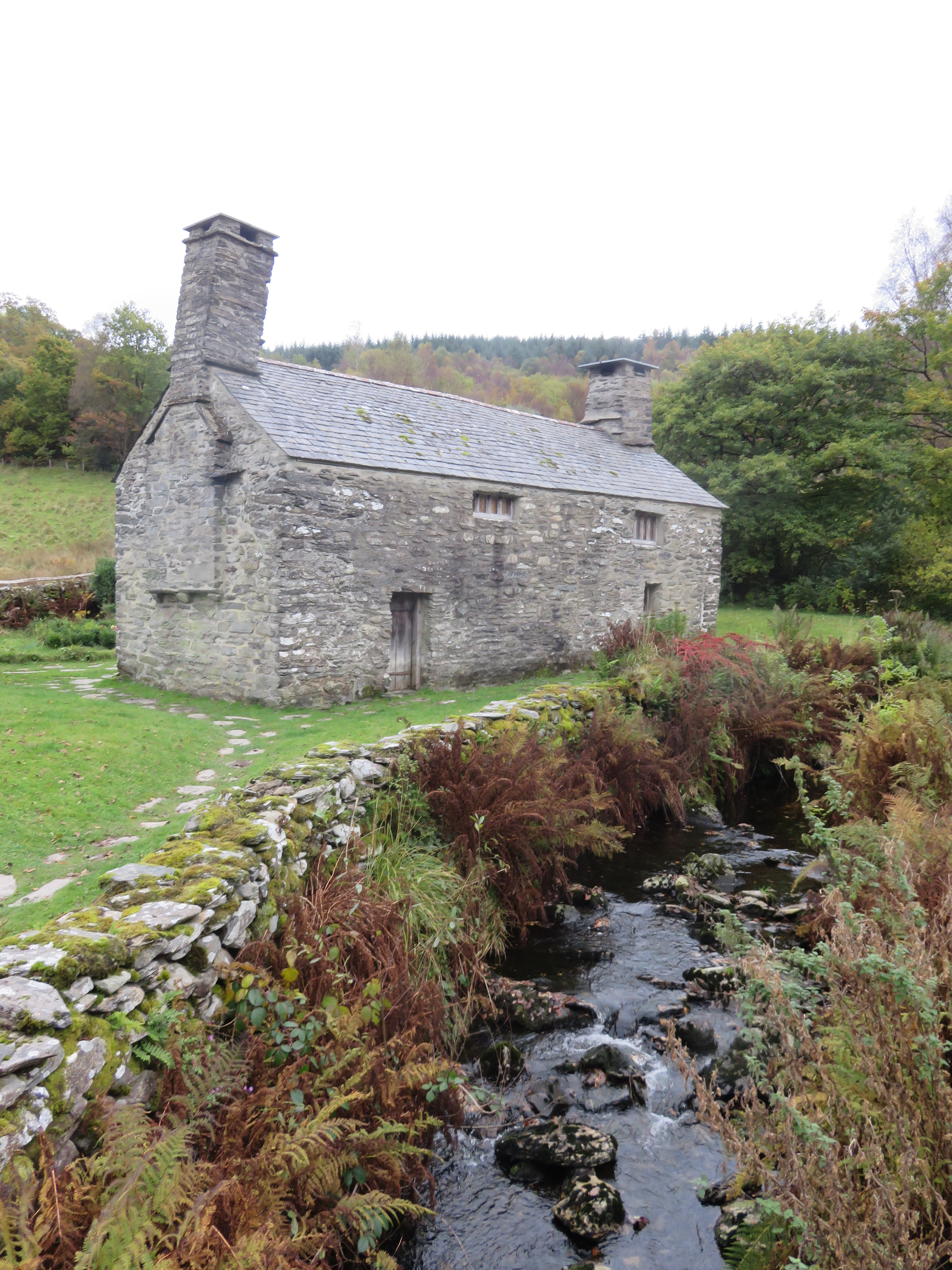
Ty Mawr Wybrnant

Poet, local historian, building contractor and quarry owner Owen Gethin Jones (1816 - 1883) was born, lived and died in Penmachno.

Huw Owen alias Huw Machno (1585 - 1637), poet, is recorded by Owen Gethin Jones as living at Coed-y-Ffynnon in Penmachno (53.061°N 3.786°W). Gethin Jones writes in his essay ("Gweithiau Gethin" (The Works of Gethin)):

Coed-y-Ffynnon, the old home of the learned and inspired Bard, Hugh Machno, who worked with... the famous Richard Cynwal. Their rank as Bards is seen in the Caerwys Eisteddfod - Hugh Machno was the winner in the Cywydd class for his ′Eulogy of Archbishop Williams′...[He] was educated at Cambridge and was one of the best debators of his day. It is said he died a batchelor and was buried in the churchyard where there used to be an oval lead plate hanging on the wall over his head to commemorate him but in one way or another, like many other things belonging to the second church it got lost.

and:

He was buried in the churchyard and carved on his gravestone is 'H. Machno obiit 1637'.

— Owen Gethin Jones pages 18 and 38 respectively

A gravestone inscribed 'H. M. Obiit 1637' exists. It is claimed that Huw Machno was descended from Dafydd Goch of Penmachno, an illegitimate son of Dafydd III (1238 - 1283, the last independent ruler of Wales as the Prince of Wales) and therefore a grandson of Llywelyn the Great.

Richard Edgar Thomas (known as Richie Thomas) (1906 - 1988), the tenor, was born at Eirianfa, Llewelyn Street, Penmachno and lived his whole life in the village. He worked at the Machno Woollen Mill ^{(Richie Thomas working at Woollen Mill)} and led the singing in his chapel for over 50 years. He first came to prominence when he won the Blue Riband at the Rhyl National Eisteddfod in 1953. He gave many concerts and numerous recordings were made, and a double album of his best work was released in 2008 under the title ′Richie Thomas - Goreuon Richie Thomas (Tenor)′ (The Best of Richie Thomas). There is a plaque to commemorate him at his birthplace.

Howel Harris Hughes (1873–1956), Principal of the United Theological College in Aberystwyth ministered here from 1901 to 1903.

== Parish Church ==
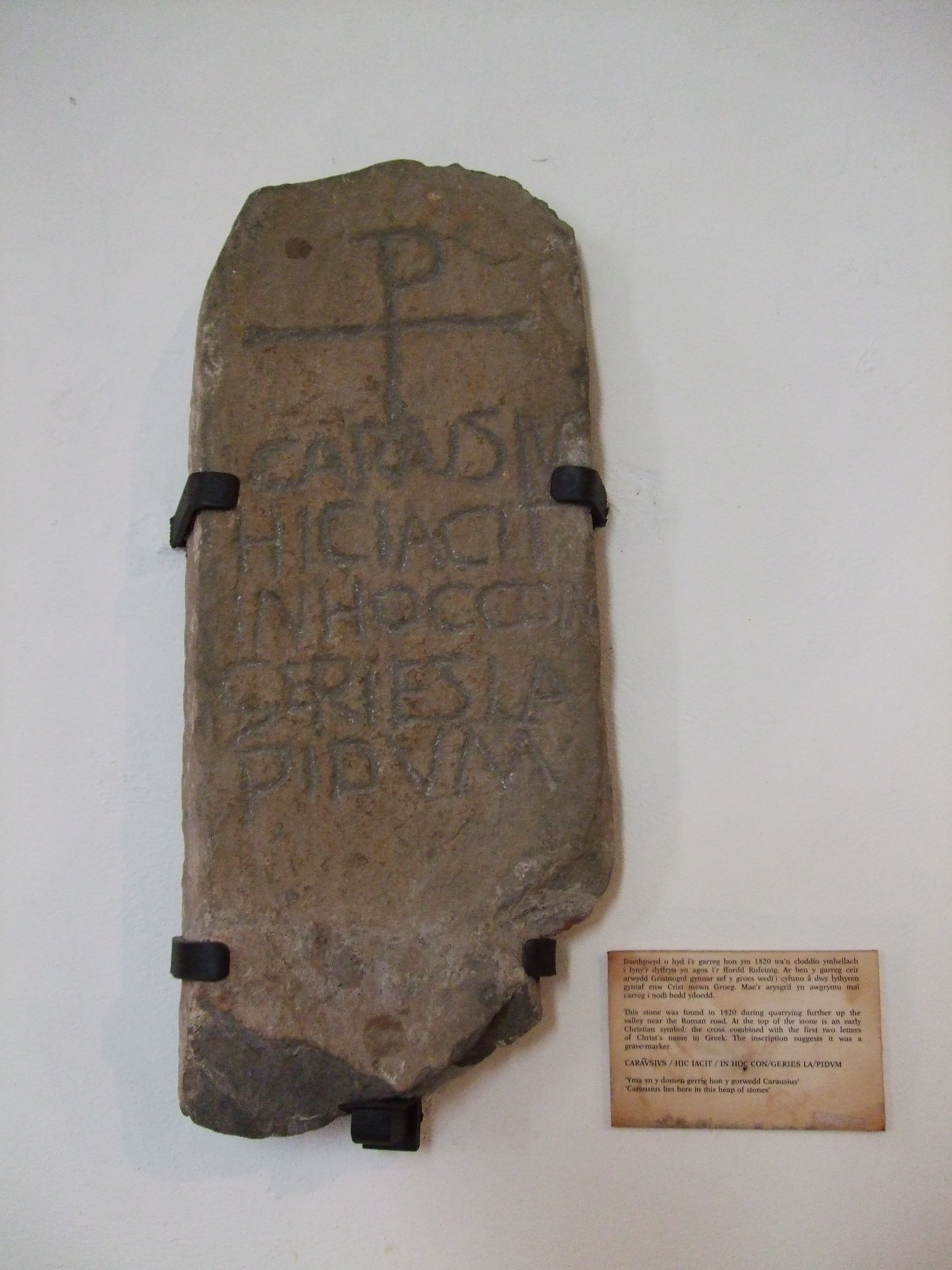
The Carausius Stone

The parish church of Saint Tudclud (alternatively Tyddyd, Tudclyd, Tudglud or Tudglyd), was built in the mid-19th century, but contains five important early Christian inscribed stone slabs dating from the 5th or 6th century. The Carausius Stone, which bears the Chi Rho symbol, was found in 1856 with two of the others when the site of the church was being cleared. It has been suggested that it is the gravestone of Carausius, a Roman military commander who usurped power in 286 and was assassinated in 293 (see Carausian Revolt), who is possibly the same person as St Caron to whom the church in Tregaron is dedicated. Another commemorates Cantiorix as a citizen of Gwynedd and cousin of the magistrate (the local ruler under the Romans, suggesting that the Roman political structure was retained locally into the 5th century after the departure of the legions). The inscription reads: Cantiorix hic iacit / Venedotis cives fuit / consobrinos Magli magistrati ("Here lies Cantiorix / He was a citizen of Gwynedd / and cousin of the magistrate Maglos".) The third of these slabs reads "ORIA [H]IC IACIT" or "Oria lies here".

A fourth stone slab was discovered in the old garden wall of the Eagles Hotel (about 40 m from the church and 15 m from the churchyard) in 1915; one interpretation of its inscription is "...son of Avitorius... in the time of Justinus the Consul". There was a consul called Justinus in 540, but the inscription is unclear and could refer to Justus (328); the broadest date range for the slab is 328 - 650. Several academics have recently suggested that the inscription refers to the Byzantine Emperor Justin II, who was consul repeatedly between 567 and 574; it is argued that this is one of a number of instances of close links between post-Roman Britain and the Byzantine Empire. The fifth slab was discovered during quarrying near the Roman road in Rhiwbach, Cwm Penmachno and just features a cross.

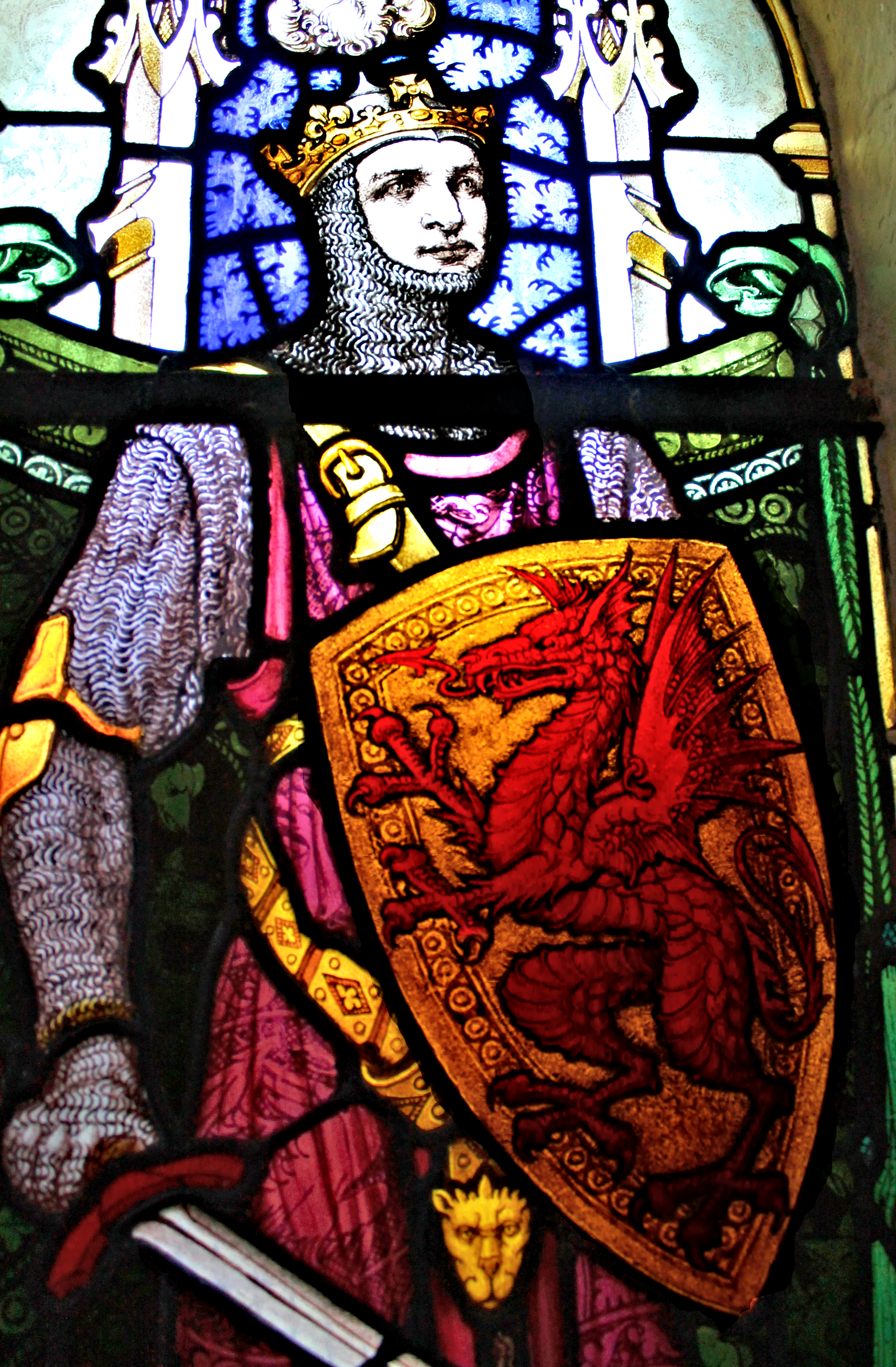
Stained glass window depicting Llywelyn ap Iorwerth (Llywelyn the Great)

The chancel of the present church stands on the site of a previous church which burnt down in 1713. Three of the stone slabs were discovered when the older church was dismantled. Also discovered was a wall of a 12th-century church; this was the church of St Enclydwyn (probably the same as St Clydwyn or Cledwyn, a 6th-century saint, the eldest son of Brychan Brycheiniog and brother of St Tudful), this church fell into ruin following the Reformation. The existing font is 12th century and from the earliest church. The discovery of the slabs on the site and the large enclosure of the church that is now the graveyard (about 100 m by 75 m), suggests there was a religious community here, probably a clas. It has been suggested that Iorwerth ab Owain Gwynedd (1145–1174), also known as Iorwerth Drwyndwn, the father of Llywelyn the Great, was buried in the oldest church, and that a sixth stone slab in the present church (a 13th-century gravestone) marked his grave.

The church is kept locked; the key can be obtained by asking at a neighbouring house.

The holy well of St Tudclud is in the cellar of the old Post Office, now a private dwelling.

== Other significant associations ==
Penmachno briefly featured during the revolt of Madog ap Llywelyn in 1294–95 as the place where Madog signed the so-called Penmachno Document, the only surviving direct evidence for the rebel leader's use of the title of Prince of Wales.

About 3 km north-east of the village centre(53.060°N 3.782°W), close to the disused 19th century, water-powered Machno Woollen Mill (Glandwr Factory or Factory Isaf)^{(Inspecting a blanket made at the factory, 1952)} built in 1839, there is a drystone-built, packhorse bridge over the Machno river. This is known as the 'Roman Bridge' but it is actually 16th or 17th century. Penmachno is, however, near the section of the Sarn Helen Roman road from Betws-y-Coed to the Roman fort of Tomen y Mur near Trawsfynydd; this road became part of the Cistercian Way between Aberconwy Abbey and Cymer Abbey which also passed near Ysbyty Ifan.

A mountain bike trail has been built at Gwydyr Forest in Penmachno. It consists of a 20 km loop with an optional 10 km extension. There are parking facilities on the site.

The village was used as a special stage in the 2013 Wales Rally GB.

== Gallery ==
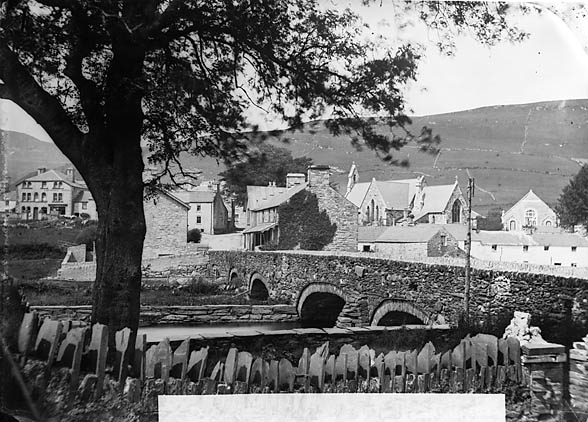
View from the Machno Hotel looking NW towards St Tudclud Church with the bridge in the foreground (about 1875)

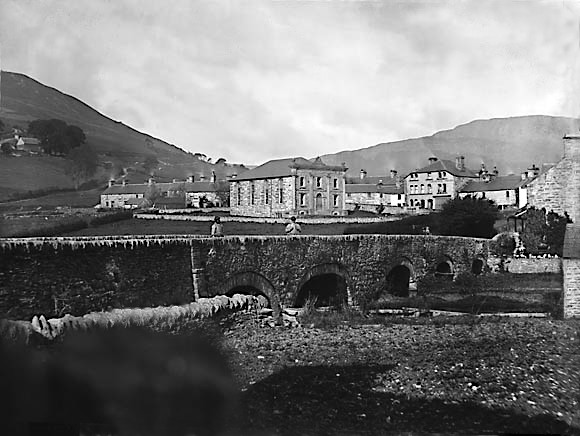
View of Penmachno looking SW towards the Bethania Chapel (about 1875)

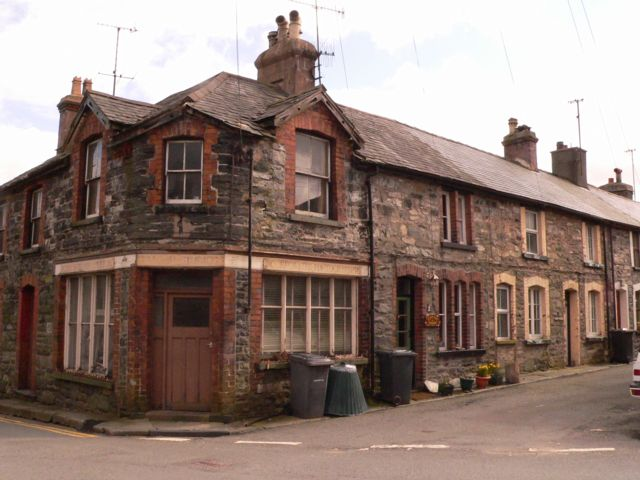
Gethin Square, Penmachno, with the old corner shop

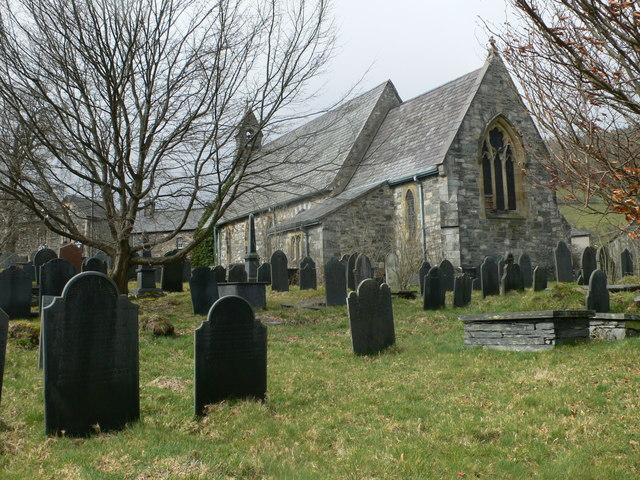
St Tudclud Parish Church, Penmachno

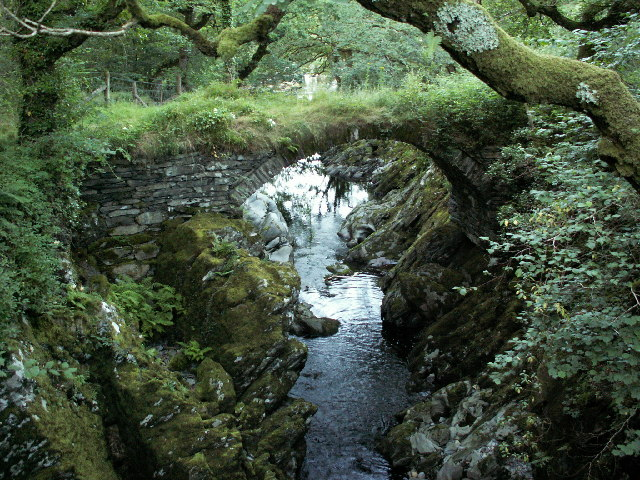
"Roman Bridge", Afon Machno

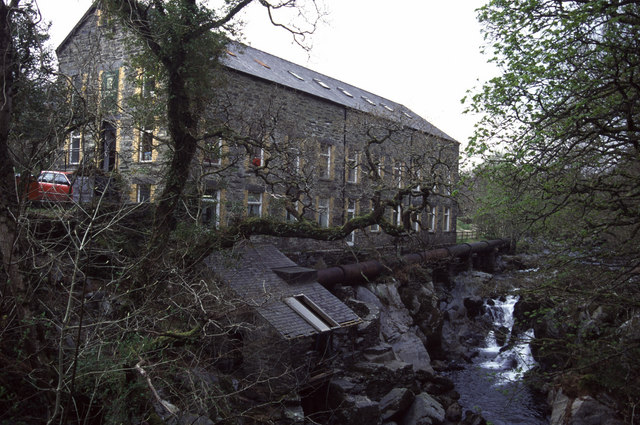
Machno Woollen Mill

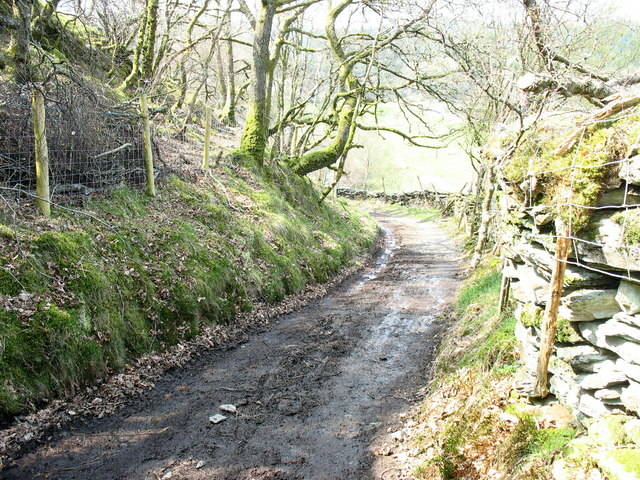
The Roman road between Betws-y-Coed and Penmachno
