= Penmachno Document =

1294 Welsh letters patent

The Penmachno Document was a letters patent drawn up at Penmachno in Gwynedd and signed on 19 December 1294 by Madog ap Llywelyn at the height of his revolt against English rule in Wales. Though unremarkable in its content – the document consists of the grant of two parcels of land to a minor noble named Bleddyn Fychan – its importance lies in the fact that it is the only surviving document issued by Madog in which he styles himself prince of Wales as well as lord of Snowdonia (this refers to the Welsh tradition that Snowdonia was the seat of power for previous Welsh princes).

== Notable signatories ==
The document was signed by a number of prominent persons in north Wales society, including three descendants of Ednyfed Fychan and the seneschal of two earlier princes of Wales. One of them, 'Tudur ab Gronw' or Tudur Hen, is described as 'our steward' in the document, suggesting that Madog had (or intended to) reconstitute the prince's council on which the governance of Wales rested until the loss of independence in 1283. As Edward I's invasion of Wales proceeded, the terms of the document quickly became irrelevant, as the land referred to in it reverted once more to English control.

== See also ==
- Madog ap Llywelyn
- Kingdom of Gwynedd
