= Cwm Penmachno =

Village in Conwy County Borough, Wales

Coordinates: 53.008°N 3.862°W

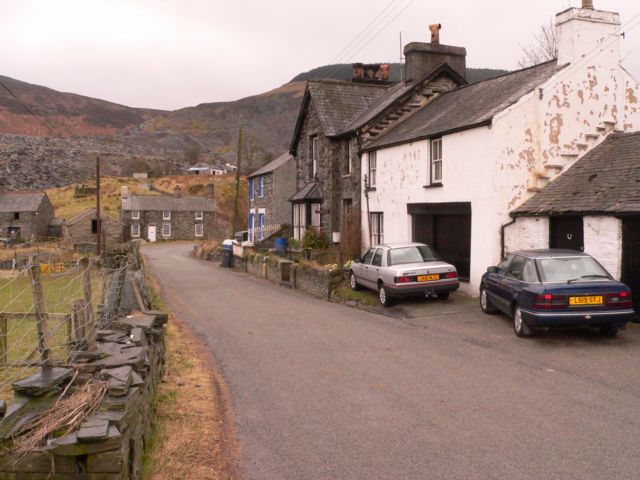
- Houses in Cwm Penmachno, showing the quarry behind

- Location within Conwy
- OS grid reference: SH750472
- Community: Bro Machno
- Principal area: Conwy
- Country: Wales
- Sovereign state: United Kingdom
- Post town: BETWS-Y-COED
- Postcode district: LL24
- Dialling code: 01690
- Police: North Wales
- Fire: North Wales
- Ambulance: Welsh
- UK Parliament: Bangor Aberconwy
- Senedd Cymru – Welsh Parliament: Aberconwy

Cwm Penmachno (historically called Tre-Gynwal) is a village at the head of Cwm Machno in North Wales.

== History ==
The village was built in the 1860s as a quarry settlement. The Penmachno quarry lay immediately south and above the settlement. Higher up the valley was the Rhiwbach slate quarry, which was formerly linked by the Rhiwbach Tramway to the Ffestiniog Railway at Blaenau Ffestiniog. Streams flow from the steep-sided valley, forming the source of the River Machno, which flows through the larger village of Penmachno before joining the River Conwy south of Betws-y-Coed.

== Facilities ==
The village attracts tourists, particularly mountain bikers, kayakers, canoeists and walkers. The Penmachno Mountain Bike Trail starts at the car park located between Cwm Penmachno and Penmachno.

There is a community centre and Heritage Room in the village at the former Shiloh Chapel.

Situated near the end of the valley is The Latymer School's outdoor centre, Ysgol Latymer Outdoor Pursuits Centre (occupying the buildings of the former primary school). The school runs residential trips each year for year 7 and year 9 pupils, as well as various Geography and PE trips. The Latymer School purchased this centre in Snowdonia National Park so that its pupils could get to know each other better and to discover their individual skills.

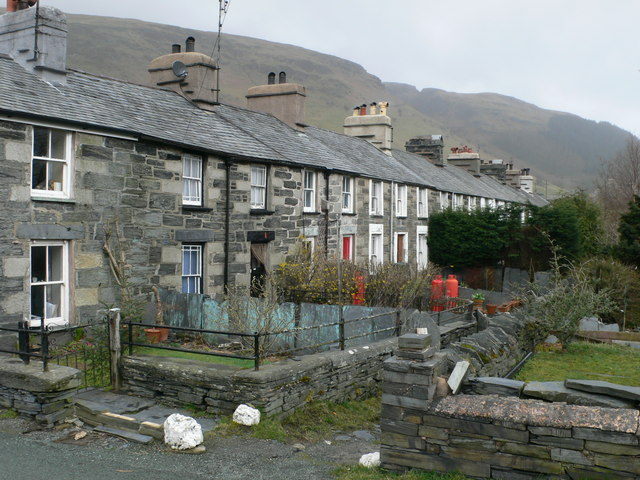
Terraced housing built for quarry workers (Rhiw Bach Terrace).

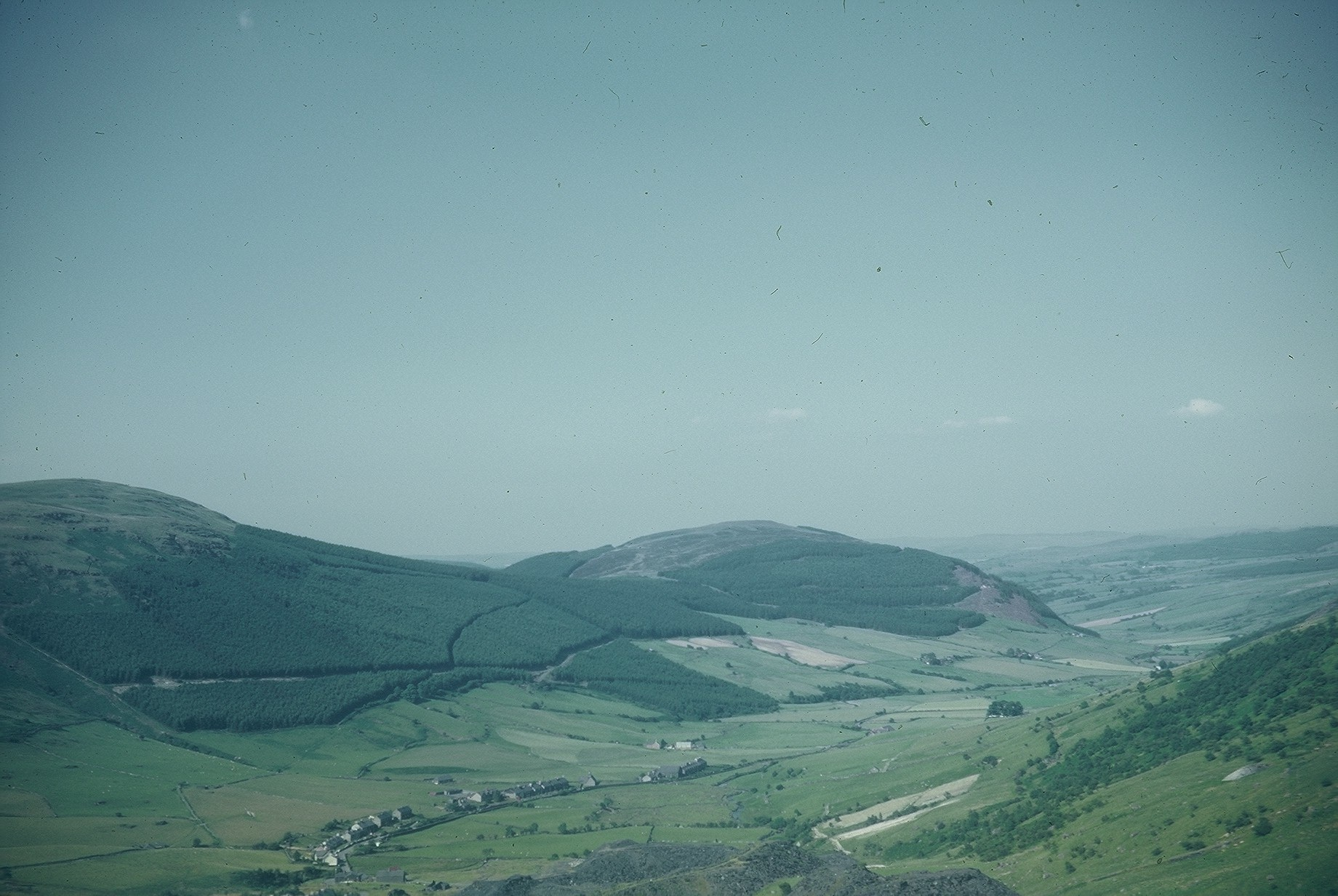
Cwm Penmachno from the south (quarry in foreground), 1969.

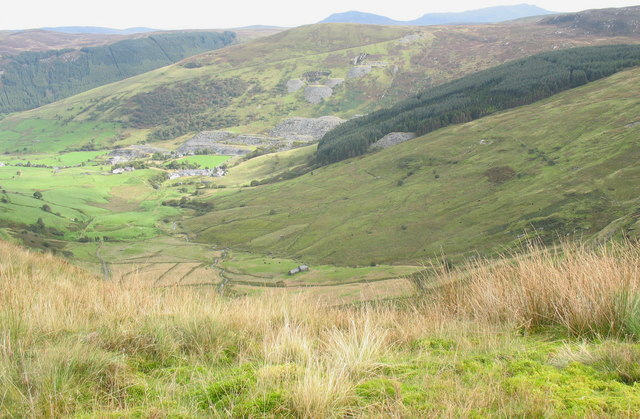
The head of Cwm Machno, the village and quarry in the background.

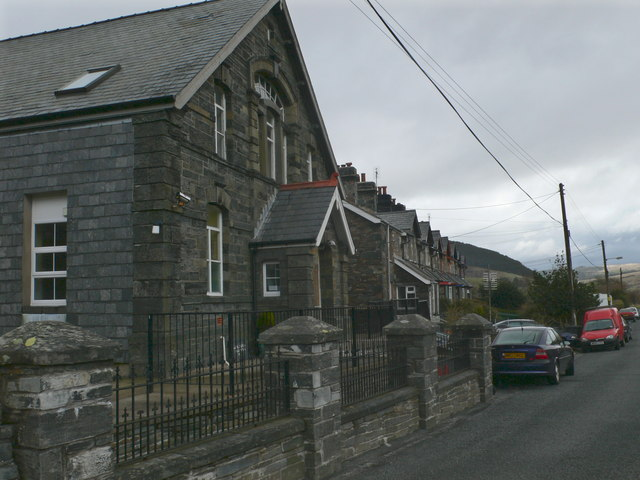
Capel Shiloh, Cwm Penmachno.

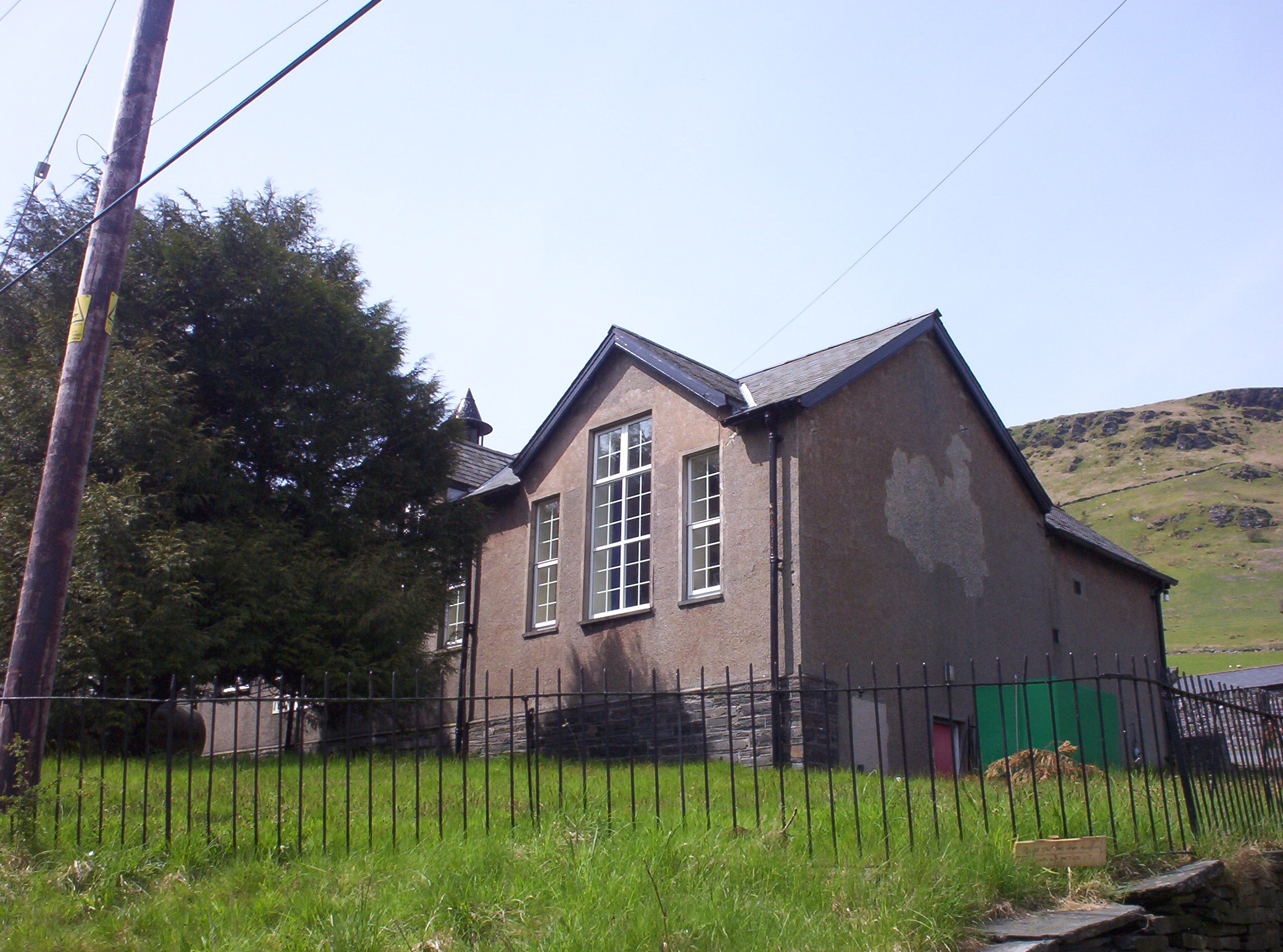
The Ysgol Latymer Outdoor Pursuits Centre.
