= River Machno =

River in north Wales

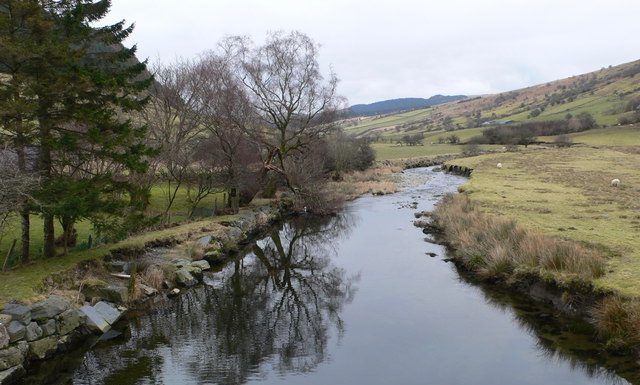
- The River Machno at Pont Rhyd-y-Gro
- Native name: Afon Machno (Welsh)

Location
- Country: Wales

Physical characteristics
- Mouth
  - location: Confluence with River Conwy

River Machno (Welsh: Afon Machno) is a river in Snowdonia in north-west Wales, United Kingdom. It is the first major tributary of the River Conwy, which it joins south of Betws-y-Coed, past the Pandy Falls and the Machno Falls.

The river originates in the hills surrounding the village of Penmachno. It has its source in the slopes at the head of the Machno valley, and flows through the villages of Cwm Penmachno and Penmachno.

The Snowdonia Slate Trail follows the whole length of the Machno Valley.

== Industrial history ==
The area around the River Machno has a history of slate quarrying, which was a significant industry in North Wales during the 19th and early 20th centuries. Some remnants of old quarries and mining activities can still be found in the region.
