= John Ernest Greaves =

Welsh slate mine owner

John Ernest Greaves CBE
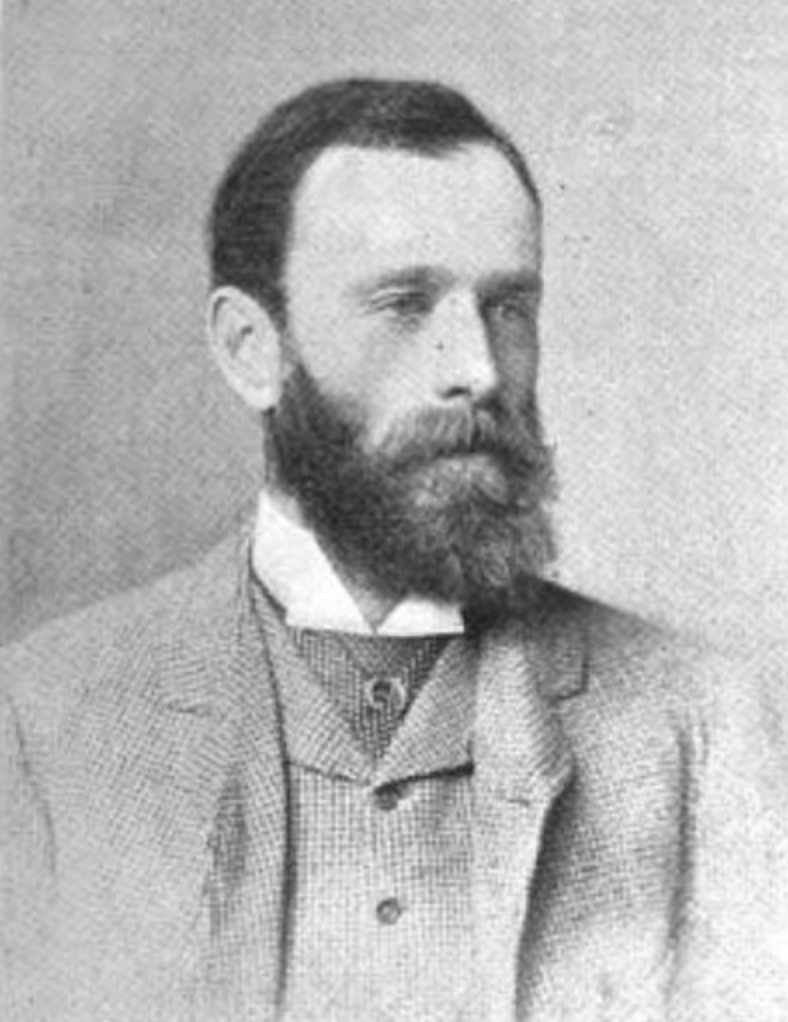
- Quarry owner John Ernest Greaves, 1897
- Born: 30 November 1847
- Died: 27 February 1945 (aged 97)

John Ernest Greaves CStJ CBE (30 November 1847 – 27 February 1945) was a wealthy Welsh slate mine owner and Lord Lieutenant of Caernarvonshire.

== Early life ==
He was born on 30 November 1847 at Tan-yr-allt, Tremadog, the son of John Whitehead Greaves, who had been instrumental in the development of the slate industry around Blaenau Ffestiniog.

He spent much of his childhood at his father's Llechwedd quarry and was educated at schools in Warwickshire, Edinburgh and Dorset before going to Worcester College, Oxford, where he matriculated in 1867.

== Slate industry ==
On his father's death, he inherited a half-share in the business and made his brother Richard Methuen Greaves General Manager. They later turned the business into a limited company, with John as Chairman and Richard as Managing Director.

== Personal life ==
He inherited the family home at Bron Eifion, near Criccieth, but in 1893 also bought the Glan Gwna estate near Caernarfon, rebuilding the hall there.

He married Marianne Rigby (1851-1934), with whom he had a daughter Dorothy (1876-1963). He died on 27 February 1945, leaving Glan Gwna to Dorothy's elder daughter, also Dorothy (1906-1966), who in 1930 in Fiji had married William Stanley Flower (1902-1940), elder son of Stanley Smyth Flower.

== Public life ==
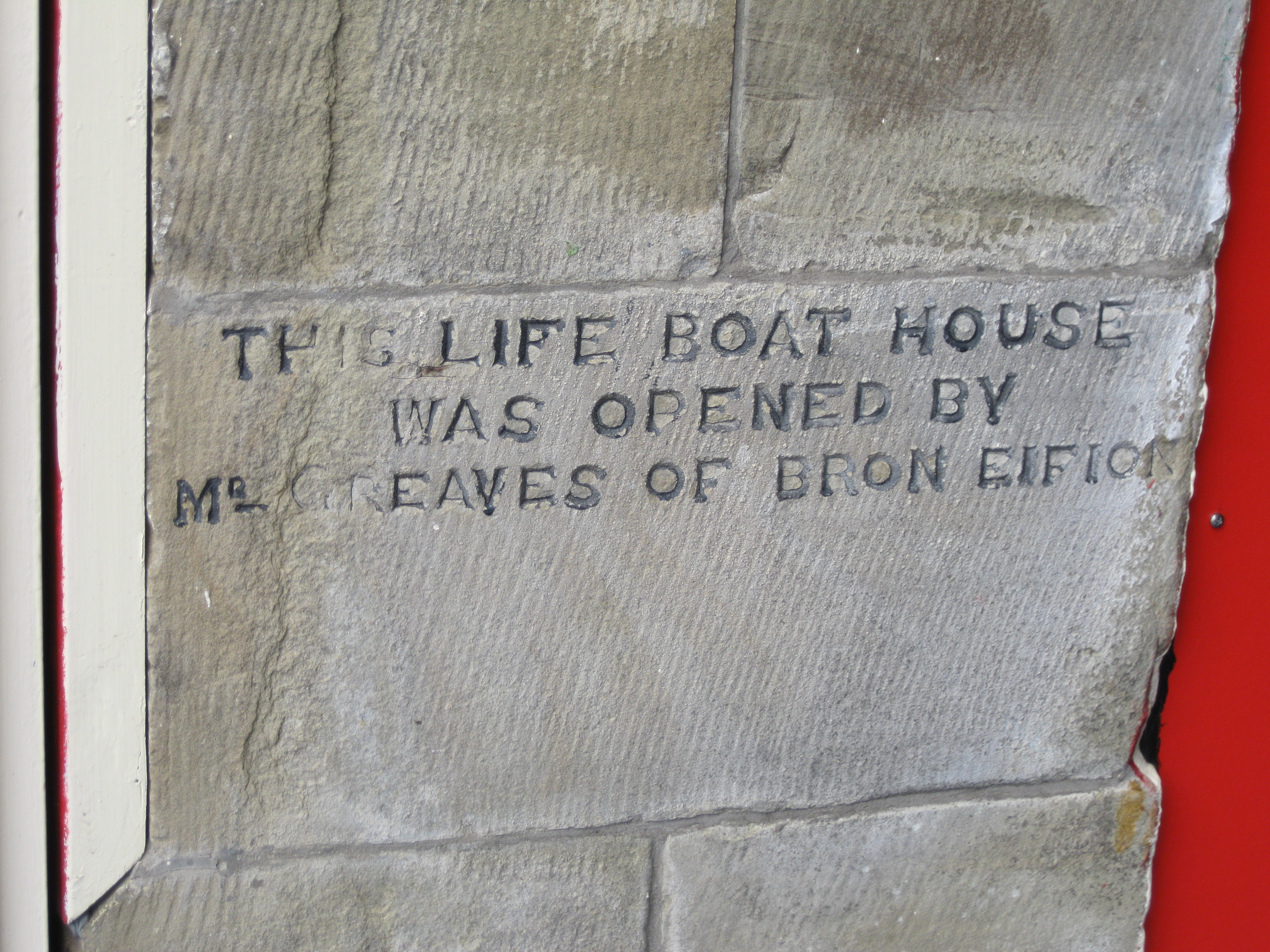
1893 Foundation stone at Criccieth Lifeboat Station

He was appointed High Sheriff of Merionethshire for 1884 and for Caernarvonshire for 1885. He was also a Deputy Lieutenant for Caernarvonshire. In 1886, he was appointed Lord Lieutenant of Caernarvonshire, the first commoner to hold the position, serving until 1933.

Greaves was president of the Criccieth branch of the Royal National Lifeboat Institution (RNLI). and is recorded as having opened the new lifeboat station in 1893.

He was very involved in public affairs as President of the North Wales branch of the NSPCC, and Chairman of the Quarter Sessions and Alderman of Caernarvon County Council. He had a particular interest in nursing standards and from 1898 was on the Council of Queen Victoria's Jubilee Institute for Nurses and was Chairman of the North Wales Nursing Association.

== Honours ==
Greaves was appointed Commander of the Most Excellent Order of the British Empire in the 1918 Kings Birthday Honours, and in 1931, as a Commander of the Most Venerable Order of the Hospital of Saint John of Jerusalem.
