= Tremadog Town Hall =

Municipal Building in Tremadog, Wales

- Neuadd y Dref Tremadog (Welsh)
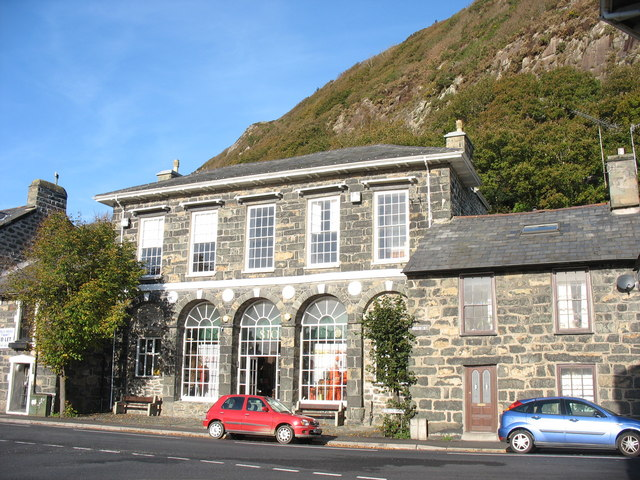
- Tremadog Town Hall

- Shown in Gwynedd
- 52.9397°N 4.1417°W
- Location: Stryd Fawr, Tremadog

History
- Built: 1810

Site notes
- Architectural style: Neoclassical style

Listed Building – Grade II*
- Official name: Market Hall (Siola)
- Designated: 30 March 1951
- Reference no.: 4452

Tremadog Town Hall (Welsh: Neuadd y Dref Tremadog) is a municipal building on Stryd Fawr, in Tremadog, Gwynedd, Wales. The structure, which was most recently used as a shop, is a Grade II* listed building.

== History ==
The building formed part of a planned settlement which was developed by William Madocks on flat land reclaimed from Traeth Mawr, the estuary of the Afon Glaslyn. The town hall was one of the first buildings in the settlement: the site Madocks selected was at the top of the Market Square at the junction of Dublin Street (Welsh: Stryd Dulyn) and London Street (Welsh: Stryd Llundain). Construction of the new building started in 1807. It was designed in the neoclassical style, built in coursed stone and was completed in 1810.

The design involved a symmetrical main frontage with five bays facing onto the Market Square; the ground floor was arcaded, so that markets could be held, and featured five tall openings with imposts, voussoirs and keystones. The keystones were decorated with cast iron floral bosses and the spandrels contained medallions, which recalled theatrical figures. The first floor was fenestrated by sash windows with cornices and, at roof level, there was a bracketed cornice and a shallow pitched slate roof. There was originally a flight of steps running right across the front of the building. Internally, the principally rooms were the market hall on the ground floor, and a dance hall on the first floor, which was accessed through a public house, now the Royal Madoc Hotel, located immediately to the left of the town hall.

A school operated from the room on the first floor until it relocated to the church in 1837. After the markets relocated, the openings were bricked up and the building fell into a dilapidated state by the 1930s. Following the Second World War, the building was refurbished, iron gates were fitted to the openings to a design by Clough Williams-Ellis and the structure became a tourist information centre for the Snowdonia National Park. In the 1970s, the three central openings were infilled with glazing, and, in the late 20th century, the building was converted for use as a shop known as "Siola" selling ethnic artefacts including furniture, clothing and jewellery. However, after Siola vacated the building in around 2008, there were difficulties finding a tenant and the building remained vacant for many years.

== See also ==
- Grade II* listed buildings in Gwynedd
