= Capel Peniel =

Chapel in Tremadog, Gwynedd, Wales

Coordinates: 52.9372°N 4.1403°W

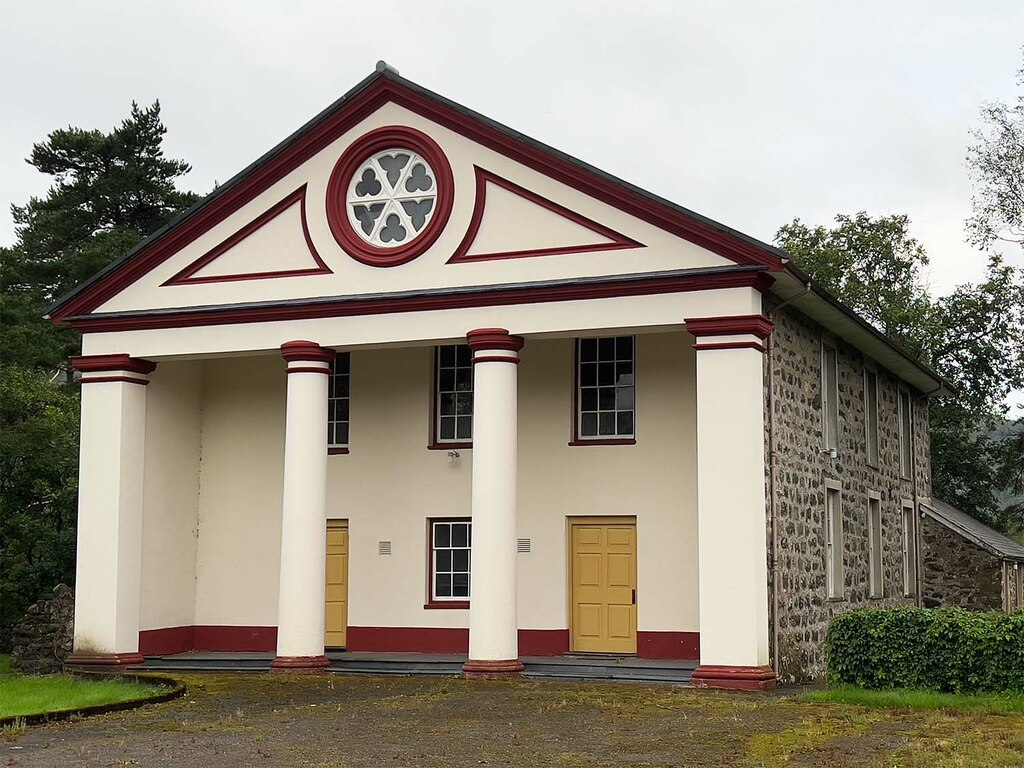
- The chapel in 2024 after restoration

- Location in Gwynedd
- OS grid reference: SH562398
- Location: Tremadog, Gwynedd
- Country: Wales
- Denomination: Presbyterian Church of Wales

History
- Founded: 1808–1809

Architecture
- Functional status: Redundant
- Heritage designation: Grade I
- Designated: 30 March 1951
- Architectural type: Chapel
- Style: Neoclassical

Capel Peniel in Tremadog, Gwynedd, Wales, is a former Calvinist Methodist chapel built in 1808–1809 and completed, to the original plans, in 1849. Among the earliest, if not the earliest, chapel in Wales built to a Neoclassical design, it was hugely influential on subsequent chapel-building throughout the country. Closed as a chapel in 2010, it suffered neglect and was placed on the Heritage at Risk Register before restoration in the 2020s. It now functions as a community hall and is a Grade I listed building.

== History ==
The chapel was built under the patronage, and possibly to the design, of William Madocks. A London-born entrepreneur, Madocks bought land around Porthmadog in Gwynedd, and developed both that and the settlement of Tremadog as speculative enterprises intended to capitalise on the trade route between London and Ireland. (Note: In 1806 a bill was placed before parliament to designate Porthdinllaen as the main port of access to Dublin in Ireland. This resulted in intense speculation in land in the area. Madocks was at the forefront of this activity, naming the two main streets in Tremadog, London Street and Dublin Street to emphasise the connection. Ultimately, Portdinllaen lost out to Holyhead, in part due to the latter's superior communications links, including the post road, now the A5, constructed by Thomas Telford.) Architectural historians suggest that the main inspiration was the London church of St Paul's, Covent Garden, designed by Inigo Jones in 1639. The main body of the chapel was completed between 1808 and 1809, although the erection of the portico was delayed until 1849 owing to a lack of necessary funds. (Note: The needs of Anglican worshippers in Tremadog were met by the Church of St Mary, built in 1811 and one of the earliest churches in Wales designed in the Gothic Revival style.) The building attracted interest from its construction. Richard Colt Hoare recorded it in 1810, and was shortly after followed by Richard Fenton, who mentioned the chapel in his 1813 publication, Tours in Wales (1804–1813). The construction of a Nonconformist place of worship angered the Anglican Bishop of Bangor; Madocks responded by the reassurance that; "the church is built on rocks, the chapel is built on sand".

The building ceased to function as an active chapel in 2010 due to a falling congregation and rising maintenance costs and was sold to Addoldai Cymru (the Welsh Religious Buildings Trust) for a nominal sum. Funding for repairs to the roof and portico were secured from the National Lottery Heritage Fund and work was completed in 2020. The contractor was Donald Insall Associates, an architecture practice specialising in historic building restoration. The building now operates as a community hall.

== Architecture and influence ==
John B. Hilling, in his 2018 study, The Architecture of Wales: From the First to the Twenty-first Century, calls Peniel the "harbinger of the style that was to dominate chapel building in Wales". Richard Haslam, Julian Orbach and Adam Voelcker, in their 2009 edition Gwynedd, in the Buildings of Wales series, suggest that the building is unsophisticated, which in all likelihood indicates that, as was common in non-metropolitan centres, the unknown designer was working from what he had seen, either in life or in pattern books, the publication of which soared in the 19th century. (Note: Hilling notes that many chapels were designed by their ministers, working as "artisan architects". He records that the Reverend Thomas Thomas designed some 900 chapels in the mid-19th century, leading him to be called "the first national architect of Wales"..) Haslam, Orbach and Voelcker note that the Tuscan columns of the portico lack entasis (curvature), suggesting that the designer was not a trained architect, but they nonetheless appreciate the chapel's "naïve charm". The Royal Commission on the Ancient and Historical Monuments of Wales considers that Welsh non-conformist chapel building, of which Peniel is an important example, amounts to a "national architecture" of Wales.

Peniel is built of rubble stone which was painted from the first. The roof is of Welsh slate. The portico is supported by two Tuscan columns and the pediment has a central Oeil-de-boeuf window. The interior retains many of its 19th century fittings, including side galleries, numbered box pews, and the pulpit. Anthony Jones, in his study Welsh Chapels published in 1996, suggests that Peniel's interior, with side galleries and a raked floor giving congregations a better view of the minister in their centrally placed pulpit, became "the standard format for virtually every chapel built in Wales after 1850". The chapel is a Grade I listed building.

== Gallery ==
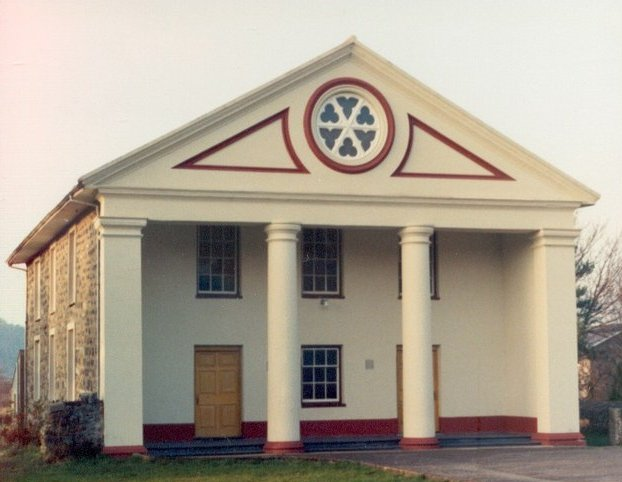
The chapel in 1986 when still in use

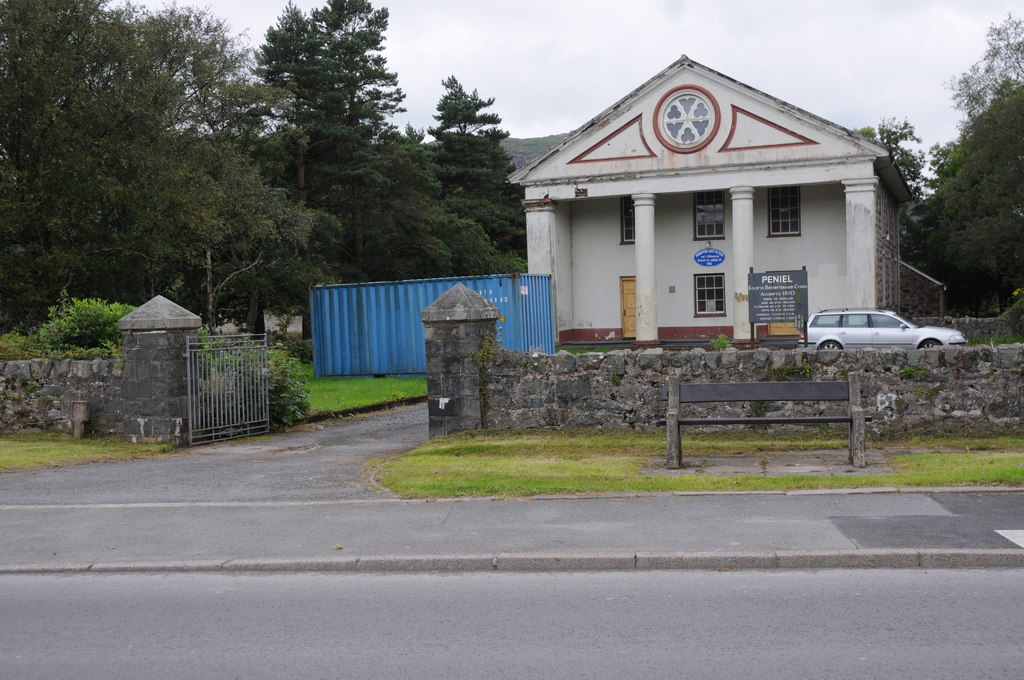
The chapel in 2011 when in disrepair

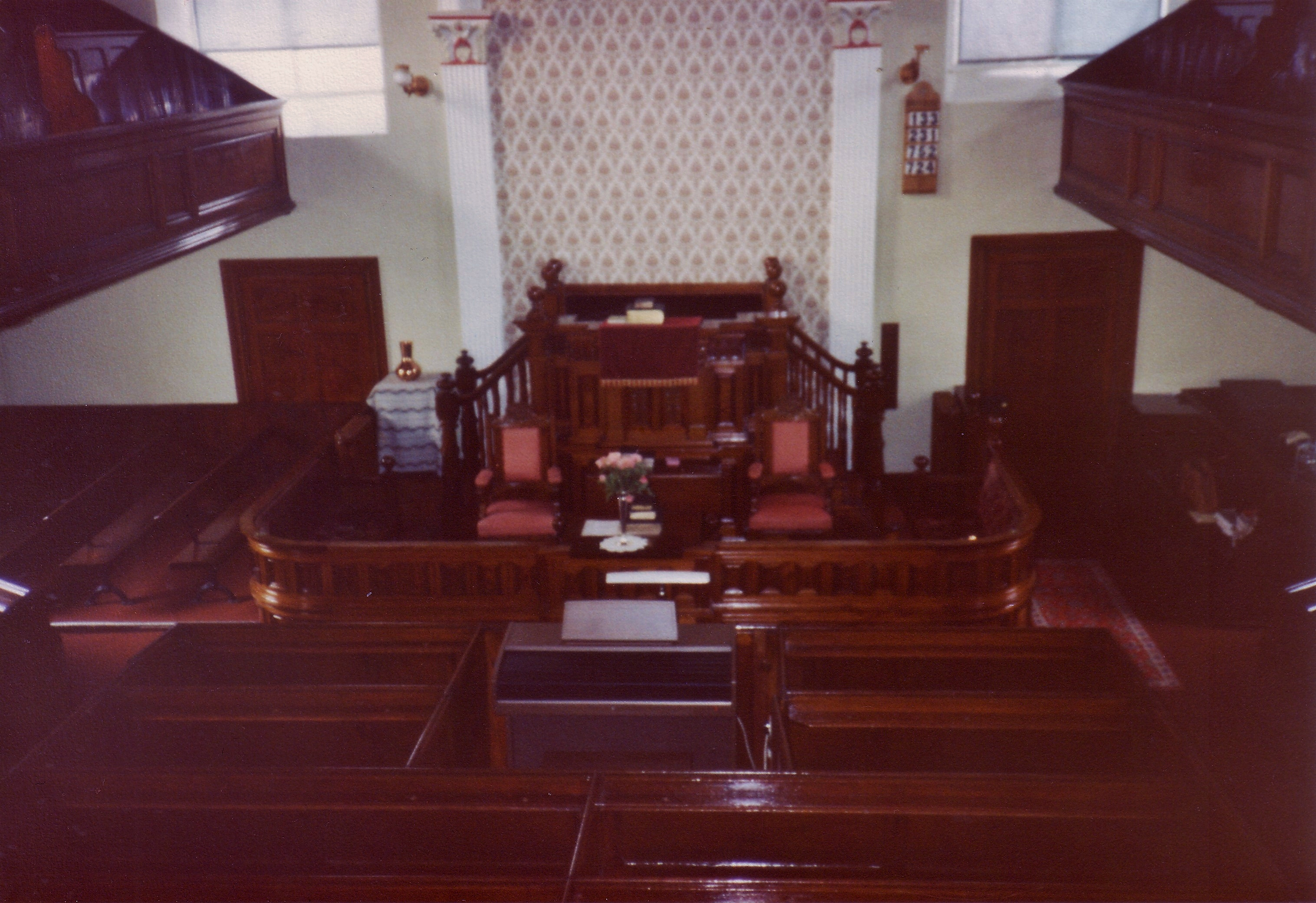
The interior in 2012, just after closure

== Sources ==
- Haslam, Richard; Orbach, Julian; Voelcker, Adam (2009). Gwynedd: Anglesey, Caernarvonshire and Merioneth. The Buildings of Wales. New Haven and London: Yale University Press. ISBN 978-0-300-14169-6. OCLC 315072973.
- Hilling, John B. (2018). The Architecture of Wales: From the First to the Twenty-first Century. Cardiff: University of Wales Press. ISBN 978-1-786-83284-9. OCLC 1034615762.
- Jones, Anthony (1996). Welsh Chapels. Cheltenham, UK: Alan Sutton Publishing. ISBN 978-0-750-91162-7.
- Roberts, Gethin (1 June 2021). "The repair and conservation of Capel Peniel, Tremadog". Journal of Building Survey, Appraisal & Valuation. 10 (1): 72. doi:10.69554/ZBWN9411.
