= Tremadoc =

Tremadoc may refer to:

- Tremadog, a village in northern Wales (of which "Tremadoc" is an alternate, anglicised name).
- The Tremadocian, the first internationally recognized stage of the Ordovician Period of the Paleozoic Era.
