= John Whitehead Greaves =

English businessman (1807-1880)

John Whitehead Greaves (21 June 1807 – 12 February 1880) was an English businessman who was instrumental in developing the slate industry in Wales.

== Early life and family ==
Born near St Albans, he was the third son of John Greaves (1774–1849), a Quaker banker, and his wife Mary (1779–1864), daughter of John Whitehead. His older brother was Edward Greaves. His older sister Celina Greaves (1804–1884) married the brewer Edward Fordham Flower and a younger sister Rebecca Mary Greaves (1814–1892) became the mother of Sir Michael Henry Lakin, first of the Lakin baronets.

John became a wanderer who ended up in 1830 at Caernarfon, where he went into the slate business. Once well established, in 1843 he married Ellen (1816–1887), daughter of a Suffolk landowner Gill Stedman. They had ten children, including John Ernest Greaves, Richard Methuen Greaves, Helen Constance Greaves (1845–1932) who married General Sir Henry Augustus Smyth, Ellen Mabel Greaves (1851-1941) who was the mother of the architect Clough Williams-Ellis, and Frances Evelyn Greaves (1864-1926) who married Sir Osmond Williams, 1st Baronet.

== Business career ==
Working existing slate deposits in partnership with other entrepreneurs, initially at Glynrhonwy but adding other sites, Greaves used the income this generated to prospect for new veins which he could exploit exclusively. He became convinced that there was a massive amount of slate underground at Llechwedd, opening the Llechwedd quarry in 1846 and in 1849 finding the enormous vein he had been seeking. His slate won a Class 1 Prize Medal at the Great Exhibition of 1851 and orders flowed in, including a contract to supply Kensington Palace.

In addition to extracting slate, he was active on the board of the Ffestiniog Railway to Porthmadog, travelling on the first train in 1836 and later serving as treasurer and as chairman, and was also involved in developing a shipbuilding industry at Porthmadog. He also pioneered machinery for processing slate. In 1860 he served as High Sheriff of Caernarvonshire.

== Legacy ==
John died at Brighton and was buried at Lillington. His son John Ernest Greaves had taken over the slate business, which still operates on a reduced scale and has developed a major tourist attraction, the Llechwedd Slate Caverns.
