= Richard Methuen Greaves =

Landowner

- Born: 14 November 1852; Tremadog, Caernarvonshire, Wales
- Died: 12 April 1942 (aged 89); Porthmadog, Caernarvonshire, Wales
- Occupation(s): Landowner and slate mine proprietor

Richard Methuen Greaves (1852-1942) was a North Wales landowner who owned and managed a major slate mine.

== Early life and marriage ==
Third son of John Whitehead Greaves (1807–80), owner of Llechwedd quarry at Blaenau Ffestiniog in Merionethshire, and his wife Ellen Stedman (1816-1887), as a young man in 1873 and 1874 he undertook a world trip. On 24 July 1883 at Wroxall, Warwickshire, he married Constance Mary Dugdale (1862-1947).

== Career ==
In 1881 a magistrate and slate quarry proprietor living at Ty Nanney in Tremadog, in 1885 he succeeded his brother John Ernest Greaves (1847-1945) as general manager of the Llechwedd Slate Quarries. He acquired the Wern estate at Tremadog in 1886 and in about 1899 bought the historic Brynkir estate at Dolbenmaen in Caernarvonshire. Greaves was interested in all things mechanical and instigated agricultural and domestic improvements on his estates. He served as Chairman of the Ffestiniog Railway from 1908 to 1920 and also as Chairman of the Carnarvonshire & Merionethshire Steamship Company. In 1896 he was Sheriff of Caernarvonshire.

== Legacy ==
John and Constance had no children, and he was succeeded by his nephew Lieutenant-Colonel Martyn Ivor Williams-Ellis (1885-1968), younger brother of the architect Sir Bertram Clough Williams-Ellis. His memorial is in the church of St Beuno at Dolbenmaen.

== Sources ==
- Gwynedd Archives, Caernarfon Record Office: Wern Estate - Papers of R. M. Greaves, retrieved 30 September 2015
- Armorial Families : a Directory of Gentlemen of Coat-Armour, retrieved 30 September 2015
