= Firth baronets =

Extinct British title of nobility

Escutcheon of the Firth baronets of The Flush

The Firth Baronetcy, of the Flush, in the Parish of Birstall in the West Riding of the County of York, was a title in the Baronetage of the United Kingdom. It was created on 20 July 1909, for Thomas Firth, head of T.F. Firth & Company at his death later that year. The title became extinct on the death of the 2nd Baronet in 1936.

== Firth baronets, of The Flush (1909) ==
- Sir Thomas Freeman Firth, 1st Baronet (1825–1909), owner of T.F Firth & Company.
- Sir Algernon Freeman Firth, 2nd Baronet (1856–1936), left no heir.

Baronetage of the United Kingdom
Preceded by Rose baronets	Firth baronets of The Flush; 19 July 1909	Succeeded by Holden baronets
