= Holden baronets of the Grange (1909) =

Escutcheon of the Holden baronets of the Grange

The Holden baronetcy, of the Grange, Thorpe, in the County of Surrey was created in the Baronetage of the United Kingdom on 21 July 1909 for the banker and Liberal politician Edward Holden. The title became extinct on the death of the 2nd Baronet in 1965.

== Holden baronets, of the Grange (1909) ==
- Sir Edward Hopkinson Holden, 1st Baronet (1848–1919)
- Sir Harry Cassie Holden, 2nd Baronet (1877–1965), died leaving no heir.

== Notes ==
Baronetage of the United Kingdom
Preceded by Firth baronets	Holden baronets of the Grange; 21 July 1909	Succeeded by Lakin baronets
