= Ffestiniog Travel =

Tourism in the United Kingdom

- Company type: Private company owned by a charitable trust
- Industry: Tour operator
- Founded: 1974
- Headquarters: Tremadog
- Key people: Alan Heywood (Founder); Maria Cook (General Manager); Nigel Burbidge (Non-executive Chairman)
- Products: Escorted rail tours
- Owner: The Ffestiniog & Welsh Highland Railways Trust
- Website: www.ffestiniogtravel.com

Ffestiniog Travel was established in 1974. It is a sister company to the Ffestiniog Railway (FR), both organisations being owned by the Ffestiniog & Welsh Highland Railways Trust which is a registered charity. Profits go to support the preservation of the FR and Welsh Highland Railway (WHR).

== History ==
Ffestiniog Travel's origins lie with the FR when its base at Harbour Station in Porthmadog, North Wales, first became a train ticketing office for British Rail. The FR thus became more than just a heritage railway, and also issued tickets for travel not only to other local railway stations but further afield. Ffestiniog Travel continues to provide a ticket only service today.

In 1973, the FR was appointed by British Rail's Shipping and International Services Division to sell Sealink Ferries and Continental rail tickets. In order to meet BR's sales target, the FR decided to sell as many tickets as possible on the longest Sealink Ferries route which was Harwich to the Hook of Holland. To do this it devised a group holiday via the Hook of Holland to the narrow gauge railways of the Swiss Alps for FR supporters. Hotel accommodation had to be arranged and onward rail journeys and a day-to-day itinerary established to ensure the tour included trips on the railway lines with Alpine scenery. This tour proved popular, with 68 bookings. And so, in October 1974, what was intended as a one-off tour to the Swiss Alps became the first of many rail holidays and Ffestiniog Travel was born.

== Operations ==
A market was perceived for future tours and destinations. Scandinavia followed in April 1975 and there was another tour to Switzerland in September.

A milestone was passed in 1979 when the first long haul tour (to Canada) was run.

A new niche in independent rail travel was beginning to open up and in 1981 a small number of customers approached the company for tailor made arrangements.

Ffestinog Travel was an integral part of the Commercial Department of the FR until 1992 when the decision was taken to make it a separate company, sister to the FR Company and wholly owned by the Festiniog & Welsh Highland Railways Trust. This was to give FT greater flexibility to develop its business beyond its traditional rail niche. The company is Ffestiniog Railway Holdings Ltd which trades as Ffestiniog Travel. Profits from FT's operations continued to be used solely to benefit the FR by being covenanted to the Trust and ploughed back to the railway in the form of capital grants. The total amount donated since 1993 amounts to £543k. This money has gone towards projects such as new carriages and renovation work at FR's Harbour Station.

Today FT runs 30 escorted rail tours each year around the UK, Europe and worldwide as well as arranging bespoke tailor made rail holidays for hundreds of travellers every year. The company also undertakes a lot of contract work for other organisations who require help to arrange a number of Special Interest Tours. These organisations supply the expert tour leader to lead the itinerary and FT arranges transport and accommodation. FT's dedicated Ticket Only department also means the company is an authority on rail routes and rail operators around the world.
