= Michael Henry Lakin =

- Born: October 7, 1846; Malvern, Worcestershire, England
- Died: 21 March 1931 (aged 84); Belfast, County Antrim, Northern Ireland
- Occupation: Cement manufacturer
- Known for: Created a baronet

Sir Michael Henry Lakin, 1st Baronet, JP, DL, was a Warwickshire cement manufacturer who was created a Baronet in 1909.

== Early life and family ==
Born in 1846, he was the elder son of Henry Lakin and his wife Rebecca Mary Greaves, sister of the slate mine proprietor John Whitehead Greaves and of Celina Greaves, wife of the brewer Edward Fordham Flower. On 1 July 1869 at Withington in Lancashire, he married Alice Emma Dewing.

== Career ==
Lakin joined the business of his uncle Richard Greaves, who had no legitimate children. The firm called Greaves Bull & Lakin quarried limestone and manufactured lime and cement, the main works being at Bishop's Itchington and Harbury.

He served as a magistrate and deputy lieutenant of Warwickshire, mayor of Warwick, chairman of Warwickshire County Council and, in 1899, as High Sheriff of Warwickshire. On 22 July 1909 he was created a baronet.

== Legacy ==
The cement business was sold in 1927. Lakin died in 1931, leaving a daughter and four sons. The eldest son Richard Lakin succeeded him as second baronet.

Baronetage of the United Kingdom
New creation	Baronet (of The Cliff); 1909–1931	Succeeded by Richard Lakin
