= Traeth Mawr =

Polder in Gwynedd, North Wales

Coordinates: 52.94°N 4.11°W

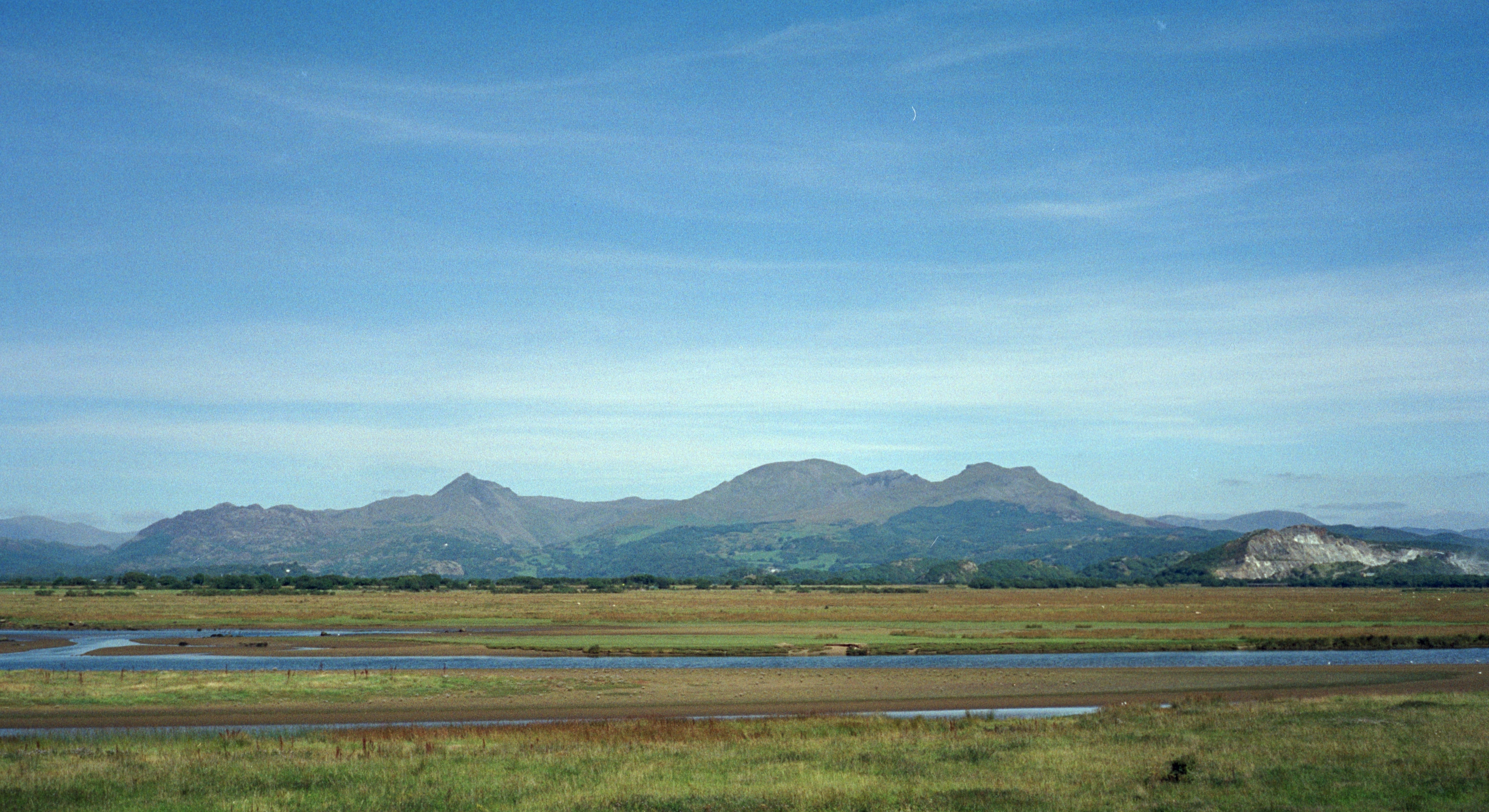
The low-lying land that forms the polder of the Traeth Mawr

Traeth Mawr (Welsh for 'large beach') is a polder near Porthmadog in Gwynedd in Wales. The area was formerly the large tidal estuary of the Afon Glaslyn. It was created after large-scale land reclamation occurred in the late 18th and early 19th centuries. A large embankment, called the Cob, separates the area from the sea and carries a road and railway line.

== History ==
=== Early years ===
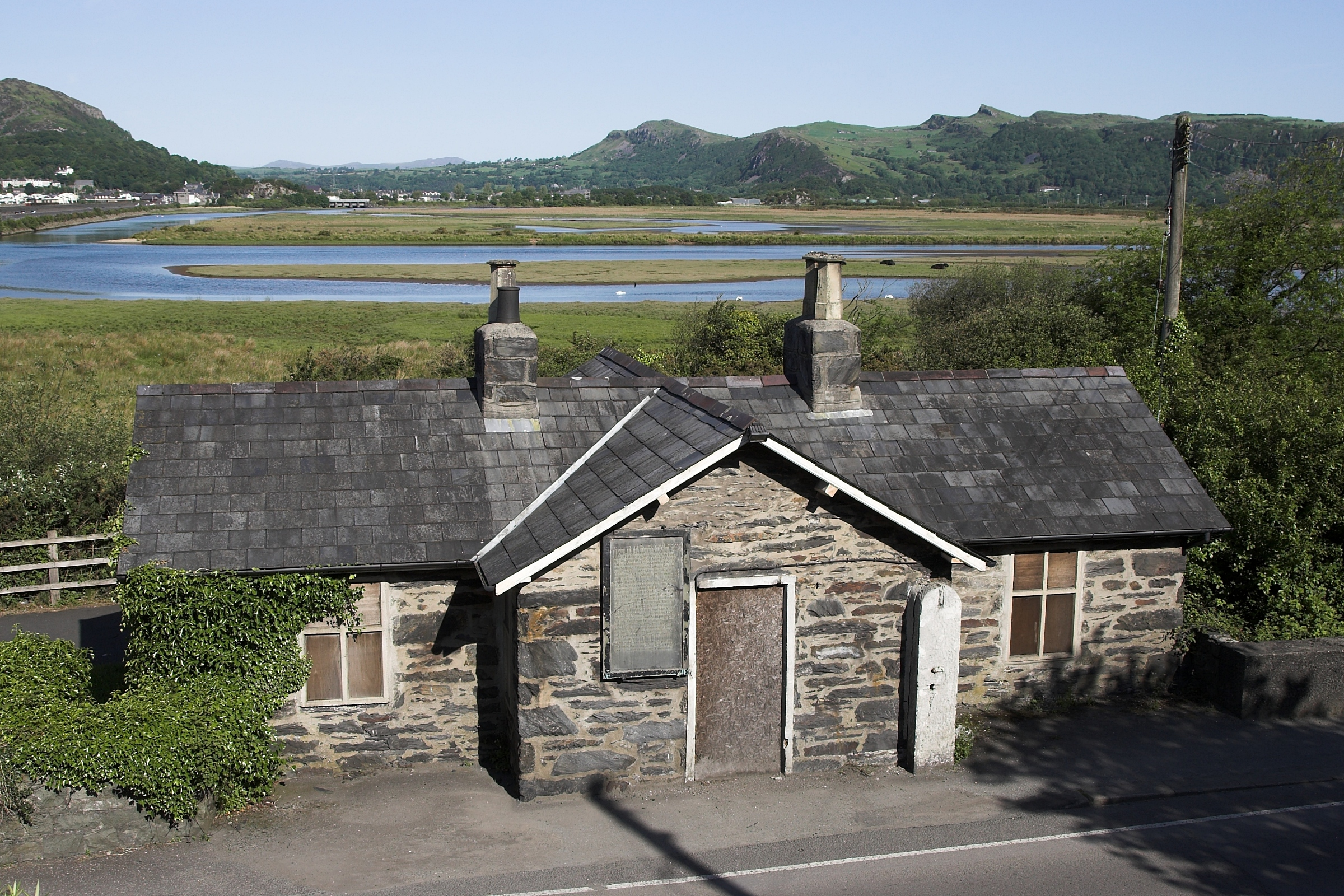
The old tollhouse at Boston Lodge

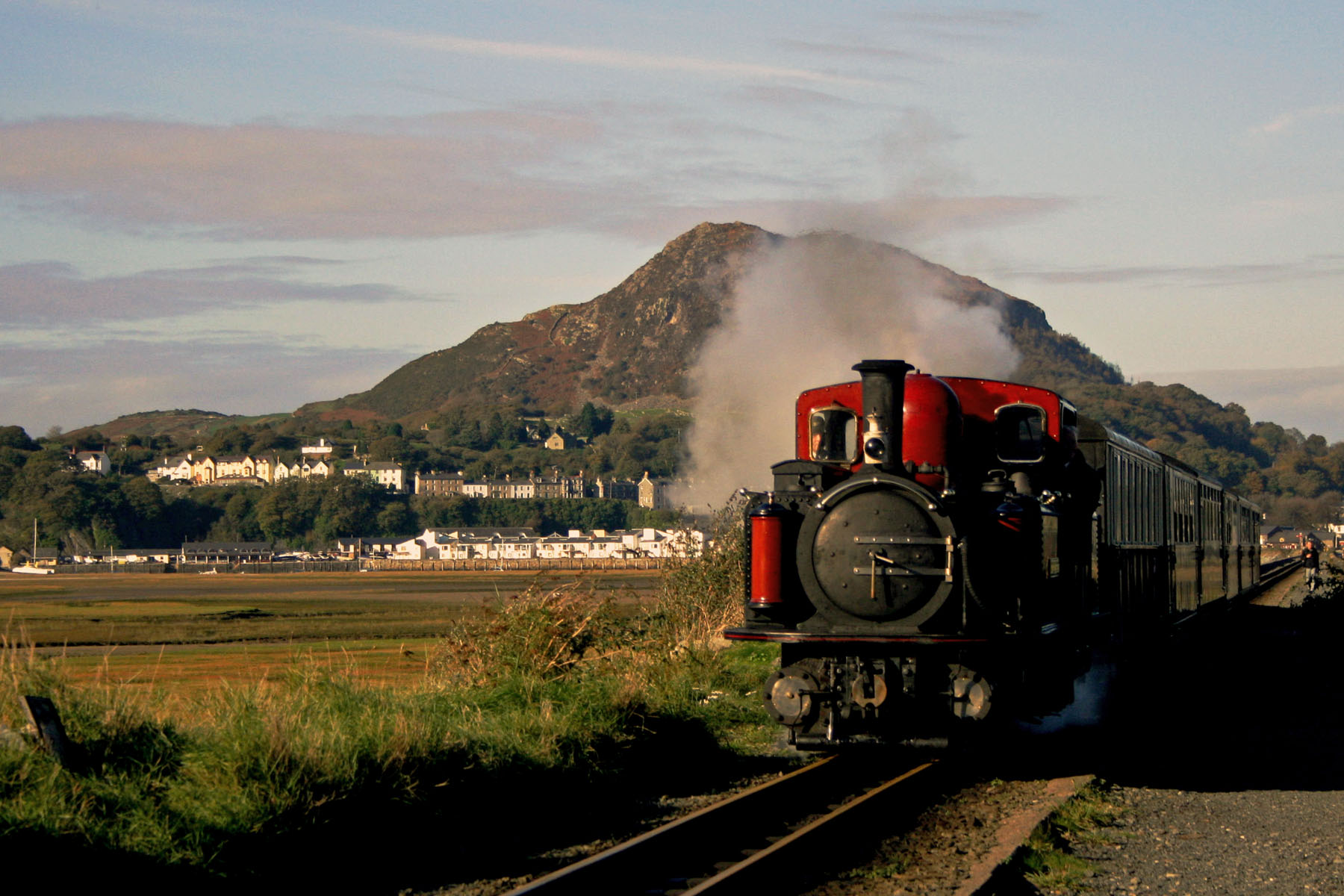
Ffestiniog Railway locomotive David Lloyd George on the Cob, heading towards Blaenau

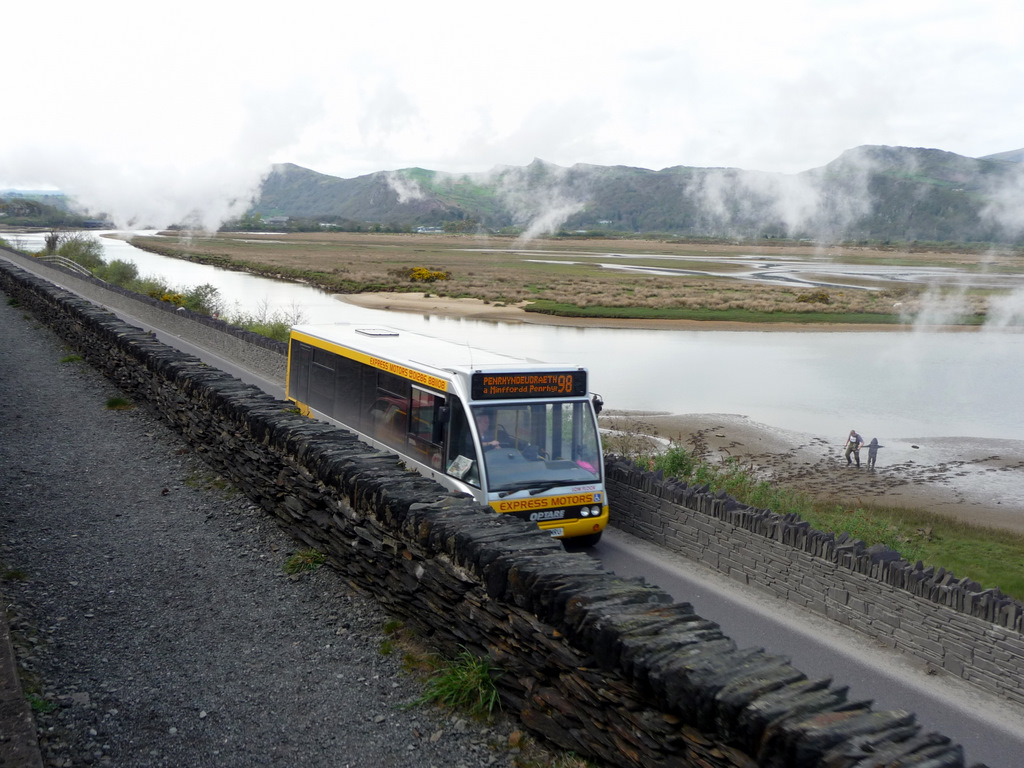
The 19th-century embankment across Traeth Mawr which is known as the Cob

The original estuary of the Afon Glaslyn was a dangerous place; many people were said to have died in the quicksands trying to cross the Traeth Mawr. In the late 18th century, various landowners around the edge of the estuary began to systematically reclaim land of between 50 acres (20 ha) and 100 acres (40 ha). Between 1770 and 1800 this resulted in the creation of about 1,500 acres (607 ha) of new land.

Around 1798, William Madocks bought the Tan-yr-Allt estate near Penmorfa Marsh. Soon afterwards he reclaimed an area of sand from the sea and the river by building a 2 mi (3.2 km) earthen bank from Prenteg to Clog-y-Berth (now Porthmadog). The township of Tremadog was founded within the new area. A wooden-tracked railway was used in the dyke's construction. The rails were later used by the Croesor Tramway.

=== Completion ===
In 1807 Madocks obtained a local act of Parliament, Madocks' Estate Act 1807 (47 Geo. 3 Sess. 2. c. xxxvi), permitting him to complete the reclamation of Traeth Mawr. Between 1808 and 1811 an embankment called the Cob was constructed from the island of Ynys Towyn (now part of Porthmadog) to Boston Lodge in the Meirionnydd. The massive stone-lined earthwork was 1,600 yards (1,500 m) long, 90 feet (27 m) wide at the bottom, tapering to 18 feet (5.5 m) at the top, which was 21 feet (6.4 m) above the level of the river. The work completed the reclamation of 1,500 acres (607 ha) of Traeth Mawr.

Soon after completion in 1812, the embankment was breached in a violent storm. Repairs were completed by the end of September 1814. Although the original estimate to complete the Cob was £23,500 (£16.9million in 2014), it eventually cost Madocks £60,000 (£43.3million in 2014) to finish. At its seaward end, Traeth Mawr joins "Traeth Bach" ("little sands"), the estuary of the River Dwyryd.

=== Transport ===
In 1836, the Ffestiniog Railway began using the Cob when it built a tramroad to transport slate from the quarries around the inland town of Blaenau Ffestiniog to Porthmadog, where it was loaded onto ships. Empty wagons were hauled back up to the quarries by horses. Loaded dandy waggons used gravity to run downhill from Blaenau Ffestiniog to the port across the Cob. After a number of trials and some modifications, the line was upgraded to a narrow gauge railway in 1863. In 1927 the Cob was breached again, and took several months to repair.

A carriageway was also constructed at a lower level on the inland side to take a public highway. Until September 2003, when the Cob was bought by the Welsh Assembly Government, all vehicles crossing the embankment were required to pay a toll. The collection of fees often caused traffic jams at peak holiday travel times: it was not exceptional for queues to back up to one mile (1.6 km) in each direction. In 2002, the highway across the Cob was widened while a separate path was added for walkers and cyclists. The pedestrian route now forms part of Lôn Las Cymru, the national cycle route from Holyhead to Cardiff.

In 2010 work started on the Porthmadog, Minffordd and Tremadog bypass to reduce the amount of through traffic in the town. On completion the original course of the A487 across the Cob was renumbered as the A4971.

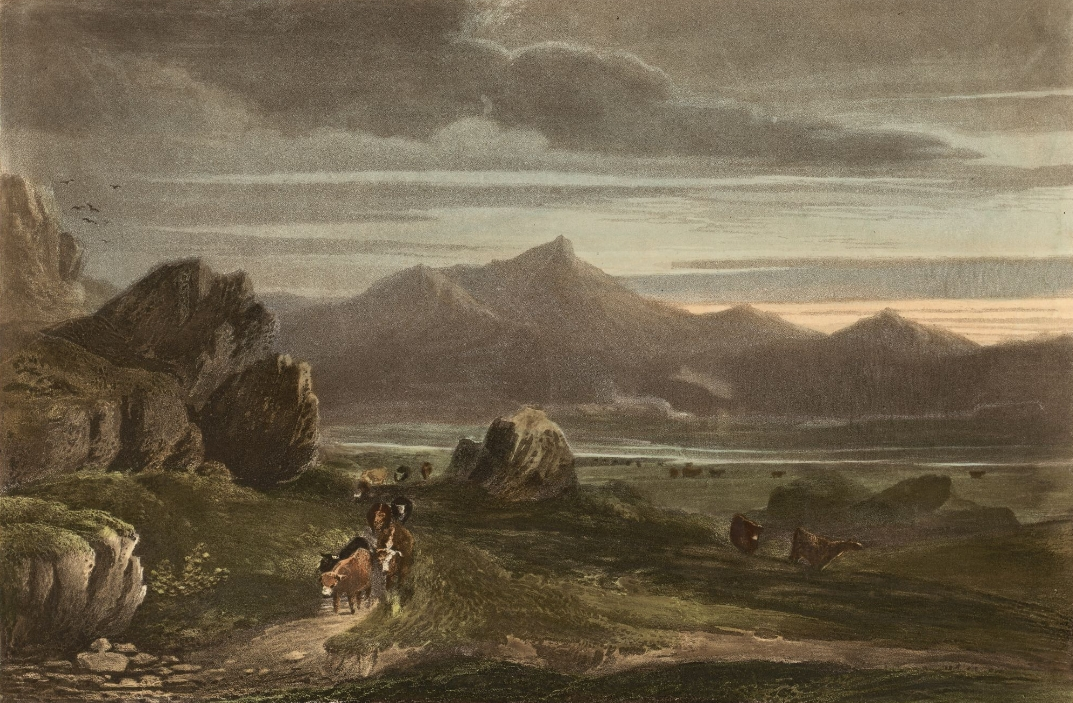
Twilight. Snowdon seen across Traeth Mawr

In 2012, 260 m (850 ft) of the embankment were widened on the seaward side of the Porthmadog end to allow a second platform to be constructed at the Ffestiniog & Welsh Highland Railway's Harbour Station.

== Bibliography ==
- Boyd, James I.C. (1975) [1959]. The Festiniog Railway 1800 - 1974; Vol. 1 - History and Route. The British Narrow Gauge Railway. Blandford: The Oakwood Press. ISBN 978-0-85361-167-7. OCLC 2074549. B1A.
- Google Earth view of Porthmadog and Traeth Mawr
- Google Earth ground-level view across Traeth Mawr
