= Lakin baronets =

Baronetcy in the Baronetage of the United Kingdom

Escutcheon of the Lakin baronets of The Cliff

The Lakin baronetcy, of The Cliff in the Borough of Warwick, is a title in the Baronetage of the United Kingdom. It was created on 22 July 1909 for Michael Lakin. He was mayor of Warwick, Vice-chairman of the Warwickshire County Council from 1919, and High Sheriff of Warwickshire.

== Lakin baronets, of The Cliff (1909) ==
- Sir Michael Henry Lakin, 1st Baronet (1846–1931)
- Sir Richard Lakin, 2nd Baronet (1873–1955)
- Sir Henry Lakin, 3rd Baronet (1904–1979)
- Sir Michael Lakin, 4th Baronet (1934–2014)
- Sir Richard Anthony Lakin, 5th Baronet (born 1968)

The heir apparent is the present holder's only son Henry Anthony Lakin (born 1999).

== Notes ==
Baronetage of the United Kingdom
Preceded by Holden baronets	Lakin baronets of the Cliff; 22 July 1909	Succeeded by Longman baronets
