= William Madocks =

Member of Parliament (1773–1828)

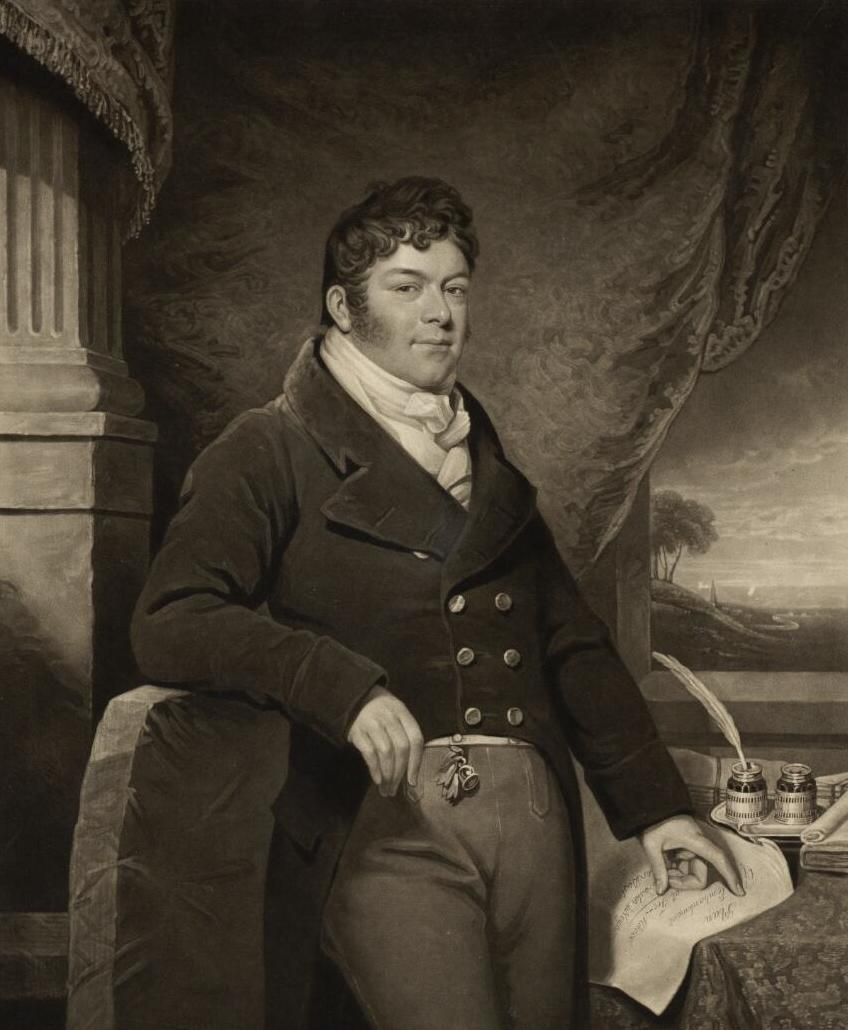
- W. A. Madocks ca. 1812
- Born: 17 June 1773; London, England
- Died: 15 September 1828 (aged 55); Paris, France
- Spouse: Eliza Gwynne
- Parent(s): John Madocks MP, Francis Whitchurch
- Engineering career
- Discipline: Civil engineer
- Projects: Traeth Mawr reclamation, Tremadog, Porthmadog Harbour

William Alexander Madocks (17 June 1773 – 15 September 1828) was a British politician and landowner who served as Member of Parliament (MP) for the borough of Boston in Lincolnshire from 1802 to 1820, and then for Chippenham in Wiltshire from 1820 to 1826. He is best known, however, for his activities as an agricultural improver in Gwynedd, especially around the towns of Porthmadog and Tremadog which he founded and which are named after him.

== Biography ==
William Madocks was born in London on 17 June 1773 to middle-aged parents. He had two older brothers, John Edward, and Joseph, but his parents had suffered the death of two further infants after the birth of Joseph, who was ten by the time William was born. His father was John Madocks, a barrister at Lincoln's Inn, who would go on to become an eminent King's Counsel, and his mother was Frances. When he was christened at St Andrew's Church, Holborn, he was given the name William after his grandfather, and Alexander after Alexander the Great, rather than because it was a family name. Frances was the daughter of a London merchant called Joseph Whitchurch, who came from Loughborough in County Down, Ireland, although her mother was English and they lived at Twickenham.

The Madocks family had long associations with Wales, traceable back to the time of King Henry II, and William's father inherited property at Llangwyfan and near Wrexham. As he rose to prominence in the legal profession, the family moved to a substantial Jacobean house with its own private theatre in North Cray, Kent, as the Welsh properties were too far away. At the age of eleven, he went to Charterhouse boarding school, and spent five and a half years there, but left in December 1789, when it appears that the Founder's Day celebrations got out of hand, and William refused to submit to a flogging of the whole class. His father backed his stance, and he worked briefly in a country solicitor's office before going to university at Oxford. His father hoped that he might also pursue a career in the legal service.

While there was support for parliamentary reform, particularly among students, at the start of Madocks' university career, the events of the French Revolution resulted in Radicals being viewed with suspicion, and there was little support for reform. The Napoleonic Wars resulted in few of the gentry making grand tours of Europe, and travel to the remote parts of Britain, including the Lake District and Wales became popular. Madocks visited North Wales often, staying at the houses of the gentry. There was a tradition of house-parties and theatre, with Sir Watkin of Wynnstay holding a six-week season of plays each winter, at which Madocks and his brothers excelled. Joseph and William were noted for their duets, but the parties also offered lively discussion of land reclamation, landscaping and agricultural practices. Madocks' ideas on communities with a sense of purpose were shaped at this time by his brother's building of a house at Erith, where he also saw the benefits of reclaimed land, in this case former marshes by the River Thames.

In 1796 Madocks purchased the Dolmelynllyn estate, using inheritance from the death of his father. He paid £1550 for the farm and £950 for the timber and underwood. He created a ferme ornée (ornamental farm) there, where he entertained friends such as Thomas Love Peacock. He was attracted to the location due to its proximity to the waterfalls of Rhaeadr Ddu, Pistyll Cain and Rhaeadr Mawddach.

=== Tan-yr-Allt ===
In 1798, Madocks bought the Tan-yr-Allt estate, on the western bank of Traeth Mawr, a large expanse of sand and tidal marsh which formed the estuary of the Afon Glaslyn. He set about extending his property by reclaiming Penmorfa Marsh from the estuary, and assisted by the surveyor and civil engineer James Creassy, who had experience of land drainage schemes in the Lincolnshire Fens around Boston, built a semicircular 2-mile (3.2 km) embankment, running parallel to the course of the river, to reclaim some 1,082 acres (438 ha) of land. The embankment was between 11 and 20 feet (3.4 and 6.1 m) high, and was made of sand, covered in turves. The project cost £3,000, and took 200 men with 150 barrows about six months to complete. He also supervised the construction of two catchwater drains and a large sluice, to drain the area behind the embankment. Madocks was growing wheat and rape on the reclaimed land in 1802, and planted barley and grass in 1803.

=== Traeth Mawr ===
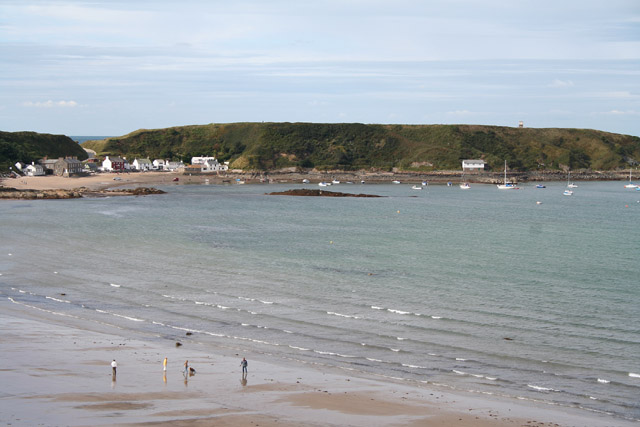
Porthdinllaen

In 1800, the British government and the Irish government both passed Acts of Parliament which created the United Kingdom of Great Britain and Ireland. The Union with Ireland meant that there was a need for improved communication between the two countries, and Madocks was in favour of a route which crossed his estate, to reach Porthdinllaen, on the northern coast of the Llŷn Peninsula, which would provide the terminus for a ferry to Dublin. However, this route involved a crossing of the dangerous Traeth Mawr sands, near the mouth of the Afon Glaslyn, or a lengthy detour to the north to cross the river at the Aberglaslyn bridge. The alternative ferry route from Anglesey involved crossings of the River Conwy and the Menai Strait, bridges over both of which had not yet been built. Madocks therefore, emboldened by the success of his first embankment, revived a plan first proposed in 1625 by Sir Hugh Myddleton, and reconsidered in 1718 and 1770, for a more substantial stone-filled embankment across the mouth of the river Glaslyn. This would enclose some further 6,000 acres (24 km^{2}) whilst providing safe passage across the estuary.

=== Arrival of Williams ===
The Porthdinllaen Turnpike Trust Act was obtained in 1803, and in 1807 Madocks succeeded in steering the Porthdinllaen Harbour Bill through parliament. The improved harbour had been designed by the engineer Thomas Rogers, better known for building lighthouses. Madocks also began the building of a model town at Tremadog, which he planned himself. Madocks also promoted the building of turnpike roads, as part of his plan to open up the area and increase its prosperity. He was unable to devote all his time to his projects, as since 1802 he had been the Member of Parliament for Boston in Lincolnshire, and divided his time between Boston, London and Tan-yr-Allt. He needed someone to manage his projects, and although there were several capable candidates at Boston, he knew he needed someone with Welsh language skills and a Welsh temperament. John Williams, a gardener from Anglesey, had arrived in search of work in 1800, and having helped with the construction of the first embankment, went on to manage the gardens and nurseries of the Madocks estate. A partnership soon developed, and without Williams, most of Madocks' engineering schemes would probably have foundered.

Construction of Tremadog continued. In 1805, work began on a water-powered woollen mill, which was overseen by the engineer Fanshaw. It was one of the first such installations in North Wales, but Madocks was not impressed by Fanshaw, who was dismissed, and Williams took over, completing the 'manufactory' in 1806.

Madocks asked Creassy to design the planned embankment and dam across Traeth Mawr, and in early 1806, attempted to obtain an Act of Parliament to authorise it. The year started badly, as his older brother John died in March, which weakened Madocks' financial support, Creassy died, leaving the project with no engineer, and the bill was defeated in parliament. Despite this, Madocks made two further attempts to obtain an Act of Parliament in 1807, the second of which succeeded. He would be responsible for its cost, and would in return receive the enclosed sands and some rent from reclaimed marshland. Williams decided the alignment of the 1,600-yard (1,500 m) embankment, which would be 21 feet (6.4 m) high, and five sluice gates, each 15 feet (4.6 m) high, would allow the Glaslyn to discharge into the sea.

=== Construction of the Cob ===
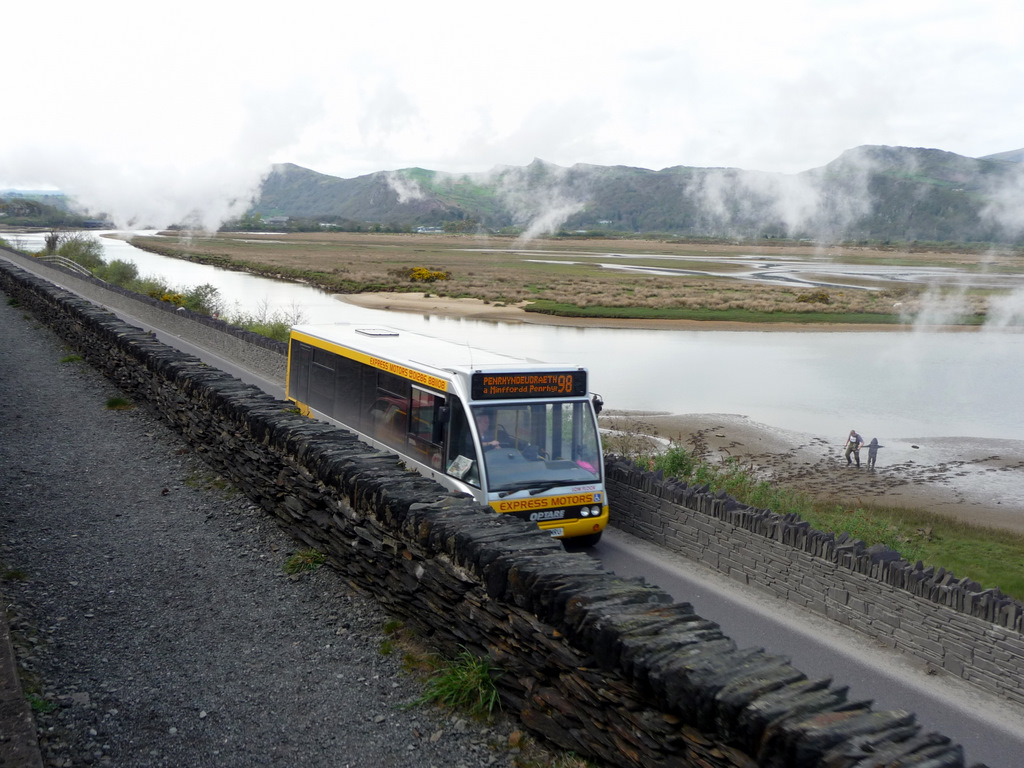
The Cob, Traeth Mawr

The estimated cost of the stone embankment (known today as the Cob) was £23,500, and a workforce of between 200 and 300 men was engaged, which created problems with accommodating them and feeding them. Madocks hoped the work would be finished by May 1809, but the work proved to be more difficult than expected. Stones tipped into the water were carried away by the sands, and the work was battered by both the tides and the waters of the Glaslyn. Eventually, rush matting was used, to form a foundation onto which the stones could be tipped, a technique well known in Lincolnshire, but not so well known in Wales. Further progress was made using this method, but there were still two large gaps in the construction. The construction of stone piers to buttress the bank and the use of boats to dump stones into the gap helped, but the work was hampered by the Glaslyn, which should by this time have been diverted to a new course to reach the sluice gates at Ynys Tywyn at the Porthmadog end. As it had not yet been diverted, it still flowed down the middle of the estuary, and scoured the back of the embankment.

By this time, Madocks was in ill-health, and was being pursued in the courts for debts, but somehow remained enthusiastic, and in July 1811, the gap was finally closed. An impromptu celebration was held, which was reported in the North Wales Gazette. A more formal celebration was held in September, which included a four-day feast, horse racing at Morfa Bychan and an Eisteddfod, which included prizes for the best Welsh Poem on Agriculture and for playing the harp.

Parliament did not re-assemble until January 1812, and Madocks spent his time in Wales trying to resolve his financial affairs and to consolidate the embankment. As a Member of Parliament, he was immune from civil arrest while Parliament was in session, but only for forty days afterwards, and the long prorogation at the end of 1811 put him at risk of being thrown into Fleet Prison, as he was being ceaselessly pursued for debt, but the Under-Sheriff at Caernarfon was clerk to John Evans, Madocks' own solicitor, and so proceedings were conveniently delayed. With Parliament reconvened, Madocks worked on steering the Boston Harbour Bill through the House of Commons.

=== Disaster ===
Disaster struck in February 1812, when a storm and high tides breached the embankment. The cost of the project had been about £60,000, much more than Madocks' first estimate, and he was in no position to finance further work. Williams circulated the news in the region, and whereas many landowners and farmers had initially been hostile to the project, they now seemed to understand its importance, and volunteered any assistance they could give. In an effort to save his estate from creditors, the land was transferred to Madocks' brother Joseph and Alexander Murray, once the clerk of his father at Lincoln's Inn. Samual Girdlestone, to whom Madocks owed £30,000, obtained a warrant on 24 March, but by the time he arrived at the estate, the land had been transferred and only Madocks personal property remained. To prevent other creditors making the estate worthless, Girdlestone bought it at its valuation cost, and became the tenant of Tan-yr-Allt. All of Madocks personal effects were sold, but there is no hint of complaint in his subsequent letters. Madocks was effectively bankrupt, but was never declared to be so, and his Parliamentary immunity again saved him from prison. Finally, in 1814, the breach in the embankment was repaired, and it was open for traffic again.

In 1814, he had a severe attack of gout and rheumatism, but sold some property in Denbighshire and recovered enough to visit France. He returned, enthusiastic to complete a bridge over Traeth Bach, the estuary of the Afon Dwyryd, which would create a route from his embankment to Harlech and Trawsfynydd. In Parliament, he was vigorously opposing the property tax, which had been introduced to fund the war against Napoleon, and opposing the repeal of the habeas corpus Act, to prevent imprisonment without trial.

=== Marriage ===
The first hints of his growing affection for Eliza Anne Hughes, who had married Roderick Gwynne but had been widowed at 21, were communicated to Williams in late 1817. She lived on her father's estate at Tregunter, in Talgarth, and Madocks took an interest in the area, including the Brecon to Hay Railway and the Brecon Canal.

Madocks was again elected to Parliament by the people of Boston in 1818, but it was the last time he represented them, as later that year he married Eliza at Talgarth, and spent much more time at Tregunter. Still suffering from illness, the journey to Boston from Tregunter was difficult, and from the election of 1820 he represented Chippenham in Wiltshire. He became part of a family which included Eliza's sister, and got on very well with Eliza's daughter Eleanora, his abilities to sing, impersonate members of the government or neighbours, and organise the decoration of her bedroom proving to be great assets. 1818 concluded with a visit to Tremadog with his new family, on a scale which was rather less grandiose than former occasions, although he still instructed Williams to organise fireworks, balls and salutes of guns. Two years later, his brother Joseph died, which should have secured Madocks' future prosperity, as he stood to inherit £12,000 from a Trust set up by his father, but he already had plans for further schemes in North Wales.

=== Regional plan ===
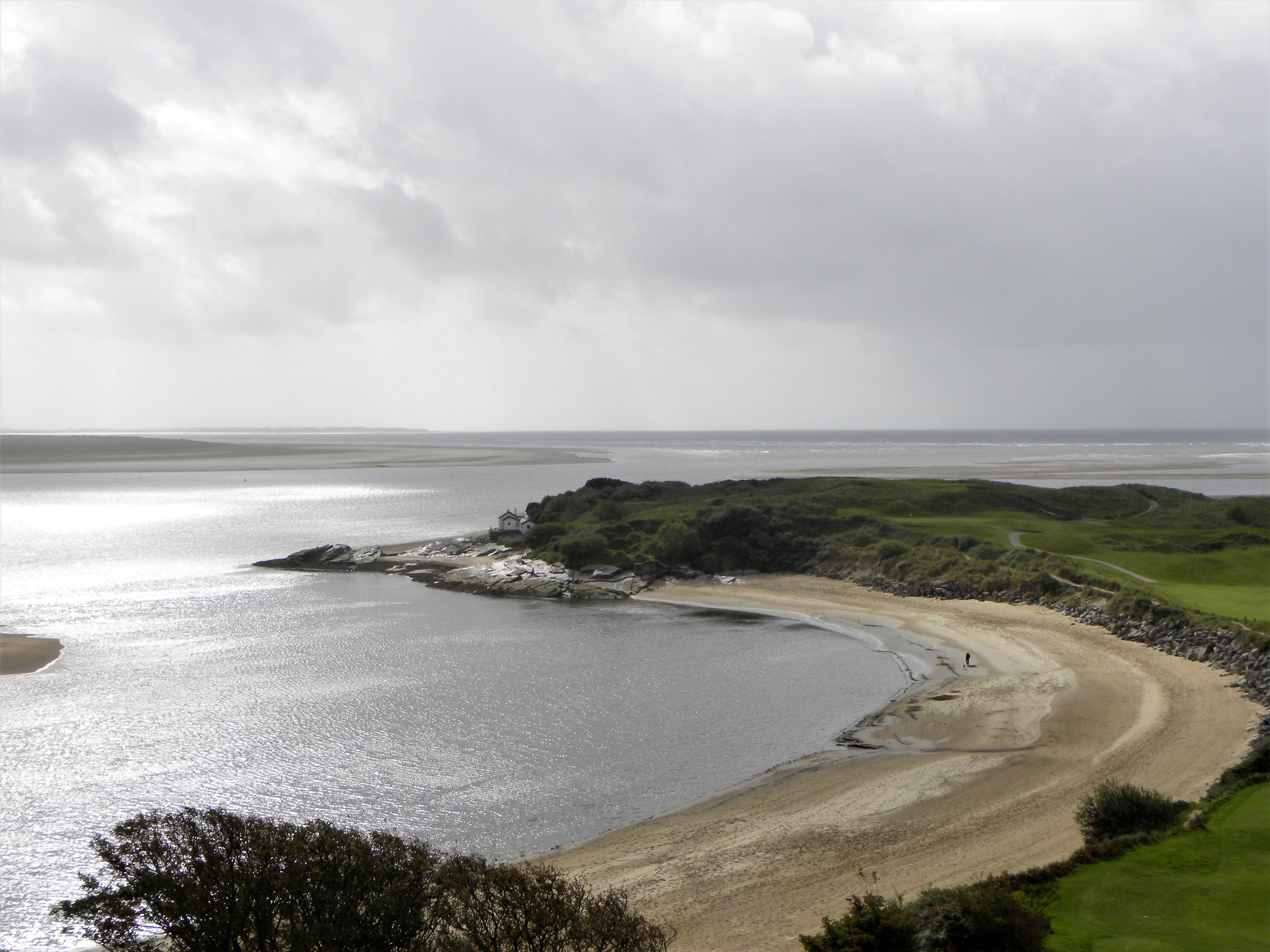
Ynys Cyngar

Madocks had always had a regional plan in his mind, which involved improving communications and creating industry. At Blaenau Ffestiniog the quarrying and mining of slates was hampered by the difficulties of getting them to market. He had once tried to develop a port at Ynys Cyngar, some 2 miles (3.2 km) from his embankment, now known as The Cob, but the effects of diverting the Glaslyn through its exit sluice were such that it had scoured out a conveniently deep channel by Ynys Tywyn, the island at the western end of the Cob. He had already built a canal from there to Tremadog, and the Ynys Tywyn location was now better suited for a harbour than Ynys Cyngar. He realised that a railway from Blaenau Ffestiniog could transport slates directly from the quarries to ships in the harbour, and set about obtaining Acts of Parliament to sanction both, but there was some local opposition to the schemes.

A route for the railway was surveyed in 1821 by George Overton, and another by William Provis in 1824, but neither was approved by Parliament. Nor was a second scheme by Provis in 1825. However, the harbour was authorised, and could be used by vessels up to 60 tons by late 1824. Williams was by this time the Director of Works for the newly named Port Madoc Harbour, and took on responsibility for the railway plans, as Madocks was suffering from jaundice. A rival scheme, backed by the banker Meyer Rothschild, was proposed to run down the Croesor Valley on the other side of the Moelwyn mountains, but included inclines over the hills to reach Blaenau Ffestiniog. The line proposed by Provis was rejected in Parliament, in favour of Rothschild's route, but then local landowners became suspicious of the rival scheme, and it too was defeated.

=== Fatherhood, ill health and death ===
Meanwhile, Madocks became a father when his daughter Eliza Anne Ermine was born. His business letters to Williams contained snippets of information about her progress. Williams also married at this time, and his wife was also expecting a baby. Tremadog was developing, and had received favourable mention in a Tour guide, which noted that Porthmadog harbour was now suitable for boats of 120 tons. With Madocks' health deteriorating, his wife decided he needed a long holiday.

A party left to visit France, Switzerland and Italy on 31 May 1826, consisting of Madocks, his wife, step-daughter, daughter, sister-in-law, a governess for Eliza, two maids and a manservant. After staying in Paris and Geneva, they spent the winter in Florence, arriving in Rome in May 1827, and soon moving on to Naples. Throughout the trip, Madocks was in regular communication with Williams, his letters covering many aspects of running the Tremadoc estate. He hoped to return to Wales in July 1827, but did not do so, and so for the first time in 25 years, was not elected as an MP in November 1827. Although the details of a disagreement between Williams and Madocks are lost, Williams decided to leave his job. Madocks wrote him a long letter, imploring him to stay, and assuming that he would, continued to correspond on the importance of diverting the Glaslyn and other matters. The holiday party arrived back in Rome in March 1828, where Madocks received a letter from Williams, who had obviously forgotten the quarrel, and Madocks immediately replied to express his joy and gratification at the content of the letter.

As they travelled homewards, Madocks' letters to Williams and to John Etheridge, who was managing the houses at Morfa Lodge and Tan-yr-Allt, were full of new ideas and instructions to ensure things would be ready for their return. He received a letter from Williams, written in March 1828, confirming that the Glaslyn had finally been diverted, to prevent it eroding the back of the embankment, and his reply to it is his last surviving letter. Having crossed Italy and Switzerland, the party stayed in Paris, where Madocks died on 15 September 1828. No mention of the cause of death appeared in any of his obituaries. He was buried on 17 September at Père Lachaise Cemetery, while a brass plaque was put up to his memory at St Mary's Church in Tremadog.

=== Legacy ===
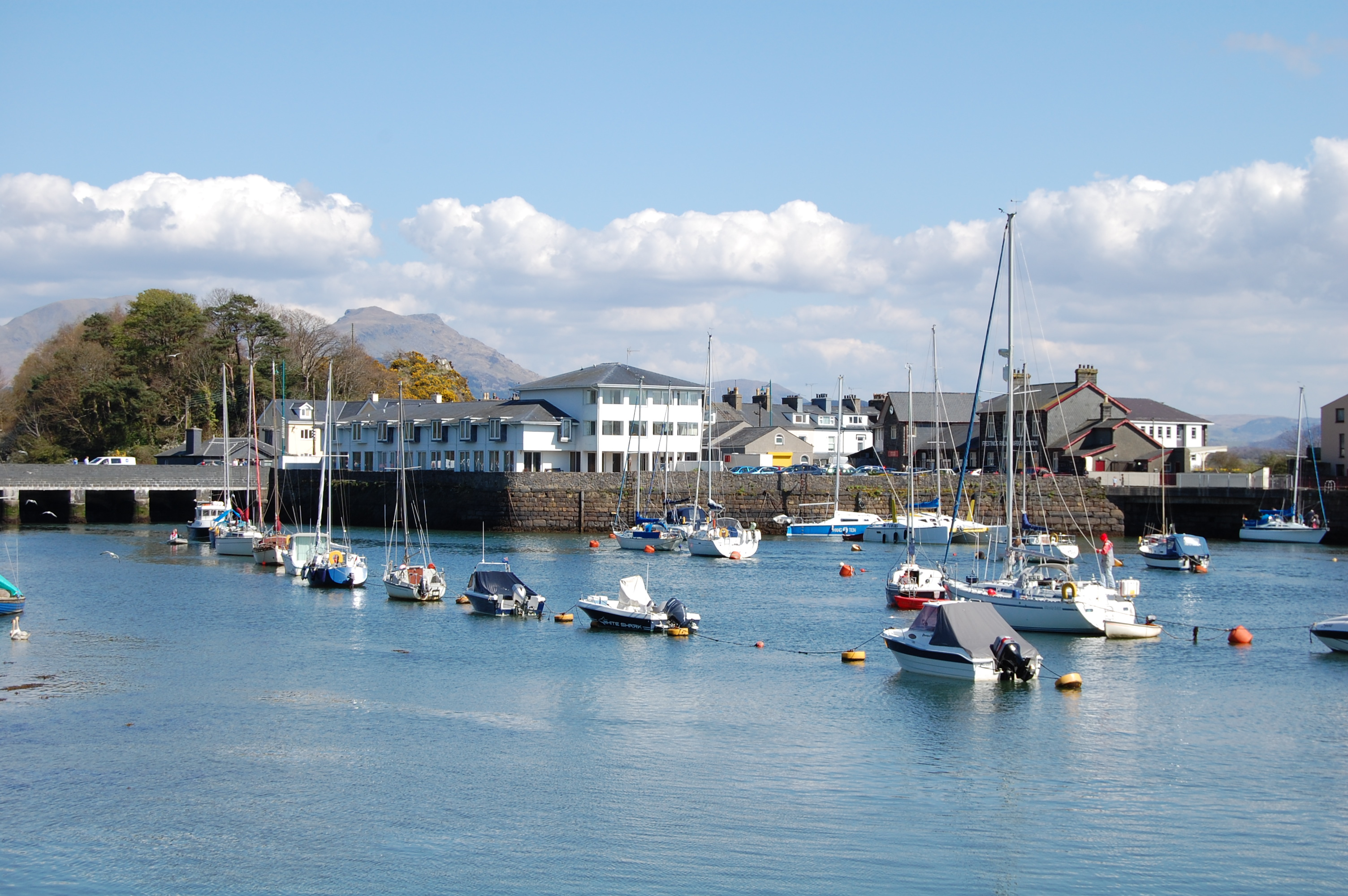
Porthmadog Harbour

Despite the chaotic state of his affairs, and the debts which took some years to resolve, he left a great legacy. In 1831, coastal duties on coal and slate were abolished, a cause for which he had fought for so long, and the revival of the slate industry began. In 1836, the Ffestiniog Railway opened, largely following Provis' route of 1825, and using the Cob to reach Porthmadog Harbour. 43,000 tons of slate were exported from Porthmadog in 1845. Porthmadog grew rapidly, but the scheme for Porthdinllaen Harbour foundered, superseded by Robert Stephenson's Britannia Bridge over the Menai Strait, which opened up the route to Ireland via Holyhead. Tremadog did not grow much bigger, but has been studied by students of architecture and town planning many times. The Bill for Catholic Emancipation, another aim for which he had fought, was passed in 1829, and the first reformed parliament, which had been one of the main thrusts of his political career, was convened three years later.

Madocks' wife returned to Tregunter, while the Tremadog estate was divided between those who had assisted Madocks in his schemes. Williams continued to serve the local community, and organised a coming-of-age party for Madocks' daughter Eliza at Tremadog, in a style reminiscent of the great festivities on which Madocks was so keen. Porthdinllaen is now owned by the National Trust, while much of the earlier 1800 embankment was used as the route for the Croesor Tramway when it was built between 1862 and 1864. It is now used by the Welsh Highland Railway, and is regularly traversed by Garratt locomotives imported from the Alfred County Railway in South Africa.

== See also ==
- Peniel Chapel

Parliament of the United Kingdom
Preceded by Lord Milsington; Thomas Fydell 1	Member of Parliament for Boston; 1812–1820; With: Thomas Fydell 1 Thomas Fydell 2 Thomas Fydell 1 Peter Drummond-Burrell	Succeeded by Gilbert John Heathcote; Henry Ellis
Preceded by Sir William Miles; Marquess of Blandford	Member of Parliament for Chippenham; 1820–1826; With: John Grossett	Succeeded by Ebenezer Fuller Maitland; Frederick Gye
