= Tremadog =

Village near Porthmadog, north Wales

Coordinates: 52.938°N 4.142°W

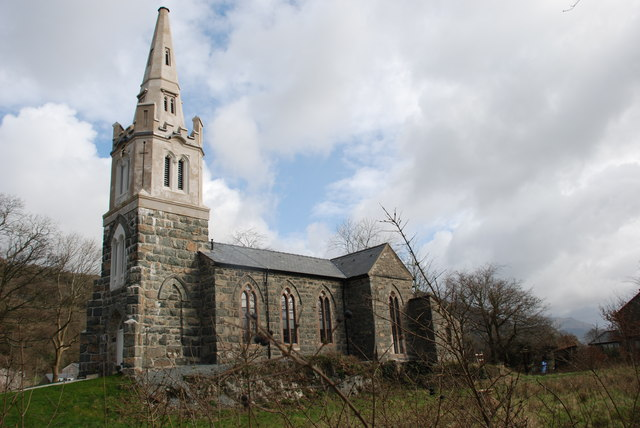
- St Mary's Church, Tremadog

- Location within Gwynedd
- Population: 1,257 (ward)
- OS grid reference: SH561401
- Community: Porthmadog
- Principal area: Gwynedd
- Country: Wales
- Sovereign state: United Kingdom
- Post town: PORTHMADOG
- Postcode district: LL49
- Dialling code: 01766
- Police: North Wales
- Fire: North Wales
- Ambulance: Welsh
- UK Parliament: Dwyfor Meirionnydd
- Senedd Cymru – Welsh Parliament: Dwyfor Meirionnydd

Tremadog (formerly Tremadoc) is a village in the community of Porthmadog, in Gwynedd, north west Wales; about one mile (1.6 km) north of Porthmadog town centre. It was a planned settlement, founded by William Madocks, who bought the land in 1798. The centre of Tremadog was complete by 1811 and remains substantially unaltered. Tremadog hosted an unofficial National Eisteddfod event in 1872.

== Planning ==
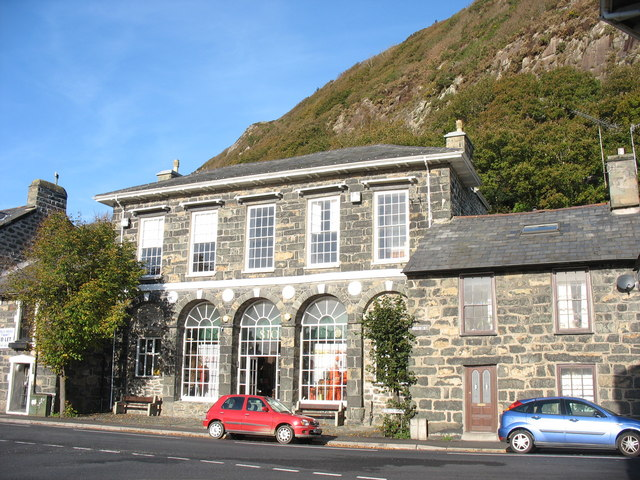
Tremadog Town Hall

Map of Cardigan Bay

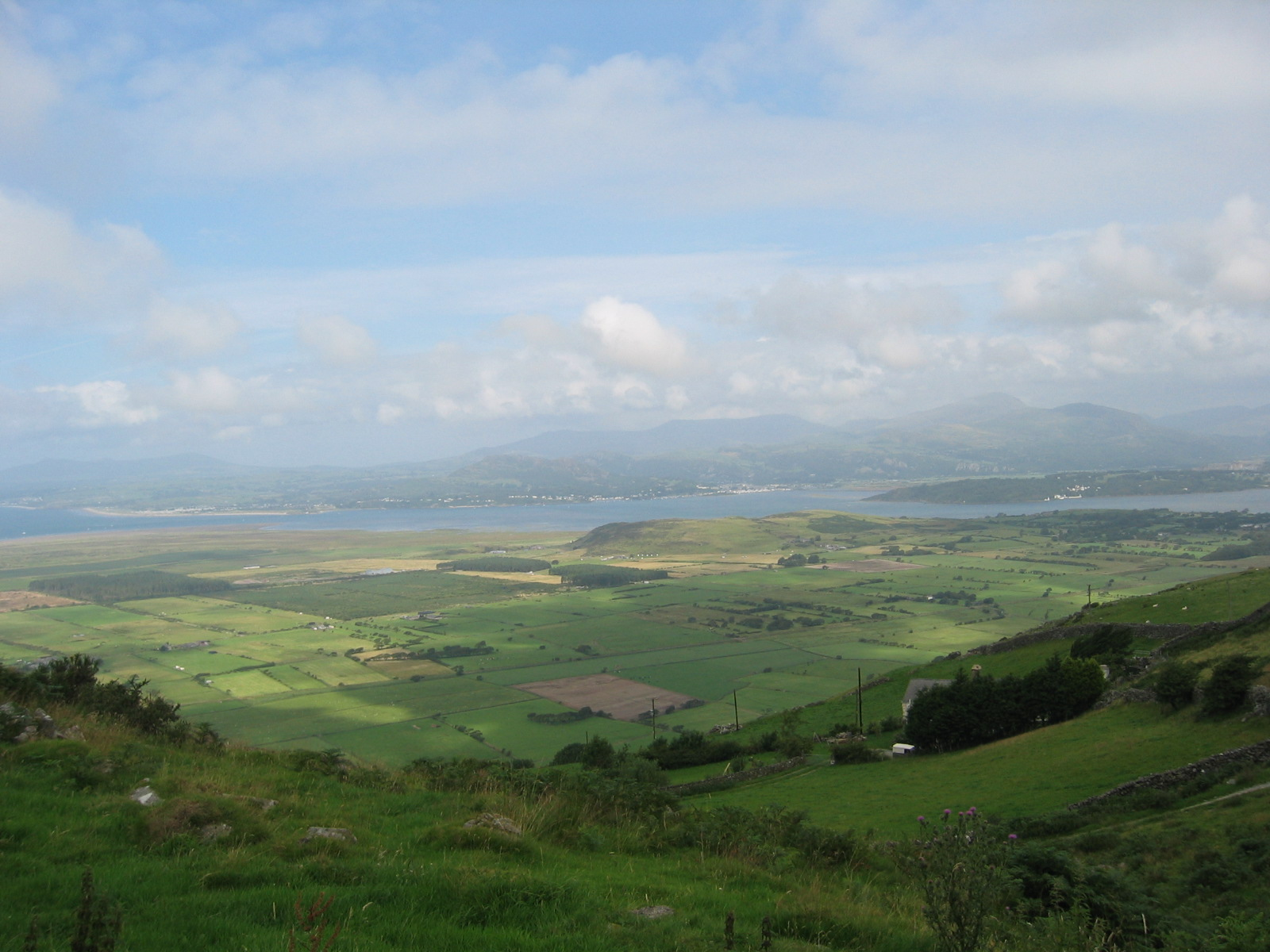
View of Tremadog Bay, from the vicinity of Harlech

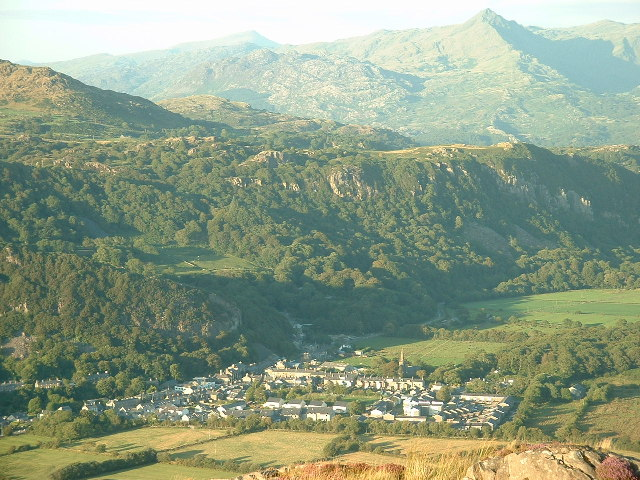
Panorama

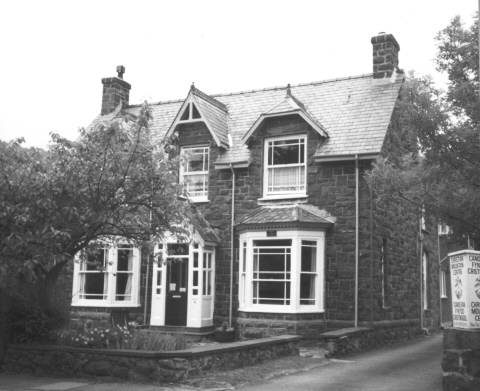
T. E. Lawrence's birthplace. The house was originally called Gorphwysfa ("place of rest") before being given the English name of Woodlands. Later it reverted to the original name, albeit using modern Welsh orthography, as Gorffwysfa, but this has more recently been changed to Lawrence House.

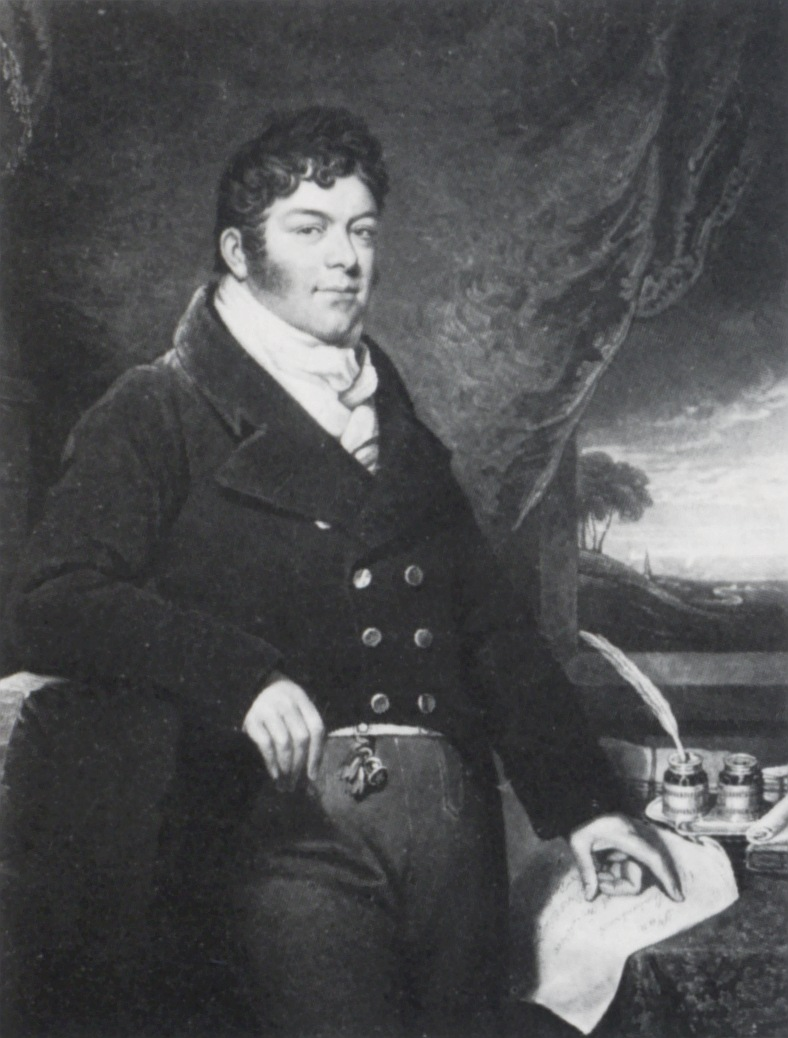
William Madocks, the designer and builder of most of Tremadog

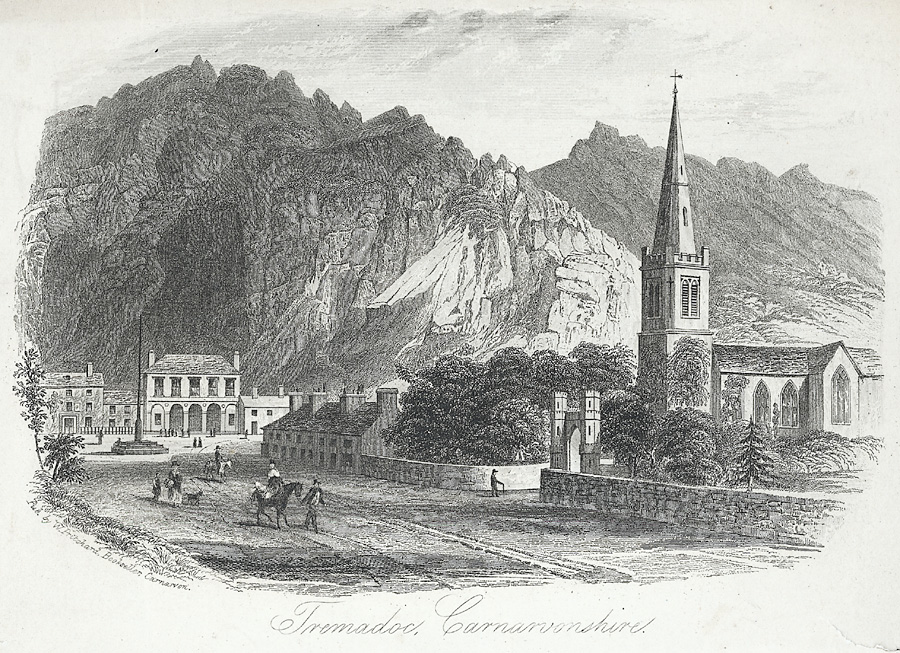
Tremadog c.1865

By mid-1805, Madocks had already built some houses on the site of Tremadog, for he wrote to the Post-Master at Caernarfon informing him that letters addressed to Pentre-Gwaelod should be delivered to the new houses he had built on Traeth Mawr, near Tan-yr-Allt. Pentre-Gwaelod translates as Bottom Village, but Madocks had grander plans, for aldermen and a mayor had been appointed, and he corrected the word "village" in a letter written soon afterward to read "borough". He planned it himself, perhaps with some help from architectural friends and architectural books, but his letters reveal that a master plan was never produced, as he held the ideas for the settlement in his mind.

Tremadog is a good example of a planned town, with an array of Georgian architecture built in the classical tradition of the 18th century. It is located immediately below the high ground of Snowdonia and on the edge of the modern Snowdonia National Park.

Tremadog was built on flat land reclaimed from Traeth Mawr, the estuary of the Afon Glaslyn, and to enhance its appearance Madocks placed the Market Square, the centre of his project, just in front of a great crag of rock, the former edge of the estuary. It towers some 100 feet (30 m) over the Town Hall, and the coaching inn, giving a theatrical effect to the area. He hoped to attract more buildings that fitted his overall plan, but this plan failed and he eventually funded most of them himself. The main streets were named Dublin Street and London Street, as Madocks wanted Tremadog to be a stopping-off point on the main route from London to Porth Dinllaen on the Llŷn Peninsula, which was intended to be the chief port for ferries to Dublin. However, this plan failed when Holyhead supplanted Porth Dinllaen as the main ferry port. He was keen that everything should enhance the village's appearance — his main interest. Unlike some contemporary town planners, he was less interested in the moral reform of the inhabitants: he felt that people had the right to work, educate their children, pray, drink, gamble, save or waste money as they saw fit; and that the town should give its residents opportunities to get on with their own lives, providing that they were congenial neighbours.

Tremadog Town Hall is located in the Market Square. Five round arches supported the front of the building, and the ground floor was used as a market hall. The dancing room had a fireplace at both ends, a minstrels' gallery on the back wall, and five large sash windows at the front, overlooking the square. It was reached by stairs from the tap room in the adjacent public house so that people attending a dance did not have to pass through the market area. The roof was in a similar style to many of Madocks' buildings, with a shallow pitch of slates, and wide eaves, while a flight of steps ran across the front of the building, creating a plinth on which it stood. There were six medallions and five keystones on the front of the building, with representations of theatrical figures.

During August, the market space became a theatre. The house to the east of the town hall was quite shallow, allowing a stage to be built behind it, connected to the market space by a proscenium arch. Madocks wrote several stirring prologues and a play for the theatre, and there are rumours that the playwright and poet Sheridan acted in a production of his play The Rivals there, although it was probably his son Tom, who was a contemporary of Madocks.

== Church and chapel ==
Madocks believed that "in education and religion all ought to have fair play", and this was reflected in the provision of a Gothic revival style church for the Anglicans and a classical chapel for the Methodists. His approach did not find favour with the Bishop of Bangor, but he defended his decision by telling the Bishop that the church would be built on rock, while the chapel would be built on sand. This was true geologically, but was also a reference to the parable of the Wise and the Foolish Builders in the Gospels of Matthew and Luke.

The church was built on a rocky outcrop, which had once been an island in the estuary, and was one of the first churches to be built in Gothic revival style in Wales. The tower supported a spire, built in brick which was rendered with Parkers Roman Cement. It deceived the antiquarian Richard Fenton, who described it as yellow freestone in his book of travels published soon after 1813. The entrance to the churchyard is spanned by a decorative arch of Coade stone, a ceramic material manufactured in Lambeth, London, which is in Gothic horror style, with representations of boars, dragons, frogs, grimacing cherubs, owls, shrouded figures and squirrels, while the tops of the towers are surrounded by elephants' heads. Madocks wanted it to become a parish church, but it was only ever a chapel of ease, as Tremadog was part of the parish of Ynyscynhaearn. The population of the parish as a whole in 1841 was 1,888. Although he provided a churchyard, no burials took place, but it was one of the few buildings in the region where services were regularly conducted in the English language.

The church was fitted with box pews, cast iron windows with coloured glass, and a blue ceiling with stars painted on it. There was a crypt, the precise location of which is unknown, in which Madocks hoped to be buried, but he died in Paris and was buried at Père Lachaise Cemetery. He is commemorated by a brass plaque, which also commemorates the wedding of Mary Madocks to Martin Williams there in 1811. John Williams, originally a gardener from Anglesey, who worked tirelessly to complete Madocks' plans when he was so often away, was buried in the vault when he died in 1850, as were his wife and their only son, W T Massey Williams.

Music was supplied by a small barrel organ, but it was not adequate and was moved to Ynyscynhaearn, where it is still in the gallery. A replacement was bought from Bates of Ludgate Hill in 1857. In 1898, the chancel floor was raised, and the windows were replaced. A new roof was fitted in the 1950s, and the ceiling was removed, while the spire was repaired with cement in the 1970s. The building ceased to be used for worship in 1995 and was eventually bought by Cyfeillion Cadw Tremadog, a trust dedicated to the repair and refurbishment of the historic buildings of Tremadog, in 2005. The fabric was repaired, and modern facilities installed. An upper floor was fitted, and the building was subsequently used as offices by Cartrefi Cymru ("Homes of Wales"), a charity which assists disabled people living in the community. Repair of the coadestone arch, requiring the manufacture of several replacement parts, was completed in 2007.

In December 2017, Ffestiniog Travel moved into the church.

Capel Peniel, which was built by the Methodists, and was one of the first buildings to be completed in the settlement, was quite unlike most Welsh chapels. On the outside, it looked like a Greek temple, while inside the pulpit was on the end wall rather than the more traditional long side wall. Methodists had begun a Sunday School in a house in 1805, and in 1808 Madocks gave them the land on a 99-year lease, subject to a peppercorn rent. It was completed in two and a half years — 18 months before the church — and the first service was led by Thomas Charles from Bala. Since Madocks and his family were there, he conducted the service in English, and the two men became friends, with Charles often visiting Tan-yr-Allt, where Madocks lived.

The front facade, with a large circular window, was not completed until 1849, and the work was supervised by John Williams, Madocks' agent, who continued to serve the community long after Madocks' death in 1828. As the congregation grew, galleries were built in 1840 and 1880, and extensive plasterwork was added between 1908 and 1910. The chapel is one of only five grade I listed nonconformist chapels in Wales, and it was hoped to refurbish it for the bicentenary in 2010.

== Governance ==
There is a separate electoral ward called Porthmadog-Tremadog. The total ward population of Tremadog at the 2011 census was 1,257.

== Industry ==
In the early 1800s, there was a thriving woollen industry, supplying garments to South Carolina and other southern states of America, the West Indies, South America, and Russia, but it was a cottage industry. One of Madocks' first projects was to build a factory where wool could be processed on an industrial scale. Although there were a few sites in Wales where the fulling of cloth was powered by water, this was one of the first woollen mills where water power was used for carding and spinning. The building was located close to his home at Tan-yr-Allt, because the high ground behind it provided a good head of water. It had a characteristic shallow-pitched slate roof, and Madocks instructed that the walls should be yellow, and the windows painted dark green. Nearby were a corn mill and a fulling mill. The water was provided by building a dam across a small valley, to form Llyn Cwm Bach, with sluices channelling the water to feed the mill and the factory.

Although Madocks initially employed a Mr Fanshawe to manage the factory, he was not happy with his performance, and soon the project was being managed by John Williams, Madocks' assistant. The building was advertised for sale in 1810, and from 1835 was used as a tannery. It still stands but has a temporary roof. In the 1990s, the Tremadog Buildings Preservation Trust obtained permission for its repair and conversion but failed to acquire the site.

== Houses ==
Most of the houses of Tremadog were of a similar plan, and in common with townhouses of the period, opened directly onto the square. They had a central doorway, with a parlour or a shop on each side, and there were two bedrooms on the upper floor. Shops were not a common feature of Welsh villages at the time, but the Mayor opened a general store, which was supplied from London, and Madocks instructed his assistant to look out for a shoemaker, a tailor, a butcher and a weaver. At the back of the houses, there was a lean-to scullery, running across the full width of the buildings. For the two inns, the nature of the reclaimed land prevented the digging of a dry cellar, and in this case, half of the scullery was replaced by a structure with a stone vaulted roof, which helped to regulate the internal temperature. Evidence of this can be seen in the bar of the Golden Fleece Inn in the village centre.

Ty Pâb was the end of the first phase of the building on the road leading to the church, originally called London Road, but subsequently renamed Church Street. Arches on the side of the building mark the planned location of a cross street, which was never built.

=== Tŷ Nanney, Tan-yr-Allt and Wern Manor ===
The ordinary houses were supplemented by several gentlemen's villas. Tŷ Nanney is a good example in the village itself, and is a Grade II* listed building. Tan-yr-Allt, Madocks' home, is situated to the north-east of the village centre. It is listed at Grade II* and stands in gardens and a small park which are designated Grade II on the Cadw/ICOMOS Register of Parks and Gardens of Special Historic Interest in Wales. Wern Manor, to the west, is also a Grade II* listed house with a Grade II listed garden, designed by Thomas Mawson at the very end of the 19th century.

== Education ==
'Ysgol y Gorlan', a primary school, is the only school in Tremadog. It is a state school which caters for 120 pupils between the ages of three and eleven. Most of the leavers go to 'Ysgol Eifionydd', the nearest secondary school, in Porthmadog.

== Canal ==
Madocks enlarged a drainage ditch to the river Glaslyn to form a canal which was opened in about 1815. It was used for 35 years to carry copper ore from a local mine, before being replaced by a tramline.

== Tourism ==
Tremadog is an increasingly popular tourist destination. The area's long, quiet roads attract motorcyclists, and Tremadog also has a good quality rock climbing "crag" (another has been closed because of rock instability) which attracts climbers from all over the UK. There have been issues with access to the crags, with local farmers and the Nature Conservancy Council trying to prevent climbing, but one section, Craig Bwlch y Moch, has been owned by the British Mountaineering Council since 1979. Deteriorating conditions led to annual events to tidy up the climbs between 2007 and 2010, and negotiations with the Forestry Commission resulted in invasive sycamore trees being removed in 2009. A further event was held in April 2012, but a climber was injured in May 2012 when huge blocks of rock were dislodged during a climb.

Tremadog also boasts one of the country's most iconic chapels. Peniel, a Calvinist Methodist chapel, was finished in 1810 and then expanded after Construction work, with its eye-catching and unusual columns, finishing in 1849, its temple front loosely based on St. Paul's Church, Covent Garden, in London.

The design of the building went on to influence how other chapels in Wales during the period were built, but the site was forced to close in 2015 as its dwindling congregation was unable to keep it open. It is set to be rejuvenated, funds pending.

Below these crags is a café, campsite and bunkhouse, which provides a base for climbers.

== Famous residents ==
- T. E. Lawrence, also known as "Lawrence of Arabia". His birthplace, Snowdon Lodge, is listed at Grade II, and now provides group accommodation for young people.
- Eric Jones, climber and base jumper, lives in Bwlch Moch.
- Barri Griffiths, TV Gladiator, professional WWE wrestler Mason Ryan
- Percy Bysshe Shelley moved into Tan-yr-Allt, Madocks' former residence, and initially promised to assist in the financing of his schemes, once he came of age, but after living there rent-free from November 1813 to March 1814 he left for Dublin, leaving behind debts which took several years to sort out.
- Rhys Meirion, opera singer was born at Bryn Ffynnon, near Ysgol y Gorlan.

== See also ==
- Tremadog Bay
- Peniel Chapel
- The Tremadocian Age is the first in the Ordovician Period of geological time, and is named for Tremadog

== Bibliography ==
- Beazley, Elisabeth (1967). Madocks and the Wonder of Wales. London: Faber and Faber. ASIN B0013IWZYW.
- CCT (July 2008). Tremadog - Historic Planned Town. Cyfeillion Cadw Tremadog. Archived from the original on 13 April 2011.
- Paget-Tomlinson, Edward (2006). The Illustrated History of Canal & River Navigations (3rd ed.). Landmark Publishing. ISBN 1-84306-207-0.
