= Welsh-language literature =

Welsh-language literature (Welsh: Llenyddiaeth Gymraeg) has been produced continuously since the divergence of Welsh as a distinct language from Brittonic in around the 5th century AD up to the present day. The earliest Welsh literature is poetry, which in its very earliest examples shows many of the features of what became known as cynghanedd or the strict metres;^{A} and for most of the history of Welsh literature poetry has been held in higher regard than prose. Poetry makes up the larger part of the surviving corpus of Welsh literature from the period prior to the 19th century; nevertheless prose has also been written in Welsh since at least the 11th century. Today, readers and students of Welsh literature can draw on sixteen centuries of writing across all major literary genres in a vibrant, living tradition.

Welsh-language literature has played a major part in the self-assertion of Wales and its people, having provided a focal point for a sense of national identity through a long period during which Wales had no form of political or administrative independence. The Welsh national anthem describes Wales as "Gwlad beirdd a chantorion" ('A land of poets and singers') and "Paradwys y bardd" ('The poet's paradise'). It has been suggested that literature, and poetry in particular, has retained a greater relative prominence in Welsh-language culture than in other cultures of Britain and Ireland, and historically both publishing and readership in Welsh has belied its status as a minority language, and significantly exceeded that seen in other Celtic languages even when Welsh was spoken by fewer people. This vibrancy continues today. Its centrality to the national consciousness is evidenced by the size and enthusiasm of the audiences attending the annual National Eisteddfod of Wales (Eisteddfod Genedlaethol Cymru), which grew out of a long-standing tradition of literary competitions to become probably the largest amateur arts festival in Europe.

== Middle Ages ==
It has been suggested that the earliest surviving literature in Welsh represents a direct continuation of a tradition of panegyric and storytelling which was already present in the pre-Roman and pre-Christian Celtic culture of Iron Age Britain. Though this would have been an oral tradition and none of its literary products have survived, Roman accounts of Celtic cultures in Britain and adjacent areas such as Ireland and Gaul point to a long-established social and political function for the Bard or poet (Welsh bardd – the concepts are not distinct in Modern Welsh) possibly overlapping somewhat with that of the Druid: they would be attached to figures of political authority to serve as propogandists on their behalf, as well as being repositories for indigenous learning. These inferences are borne out by the fact this function appears to be already well established in the earliest Welsh literature.

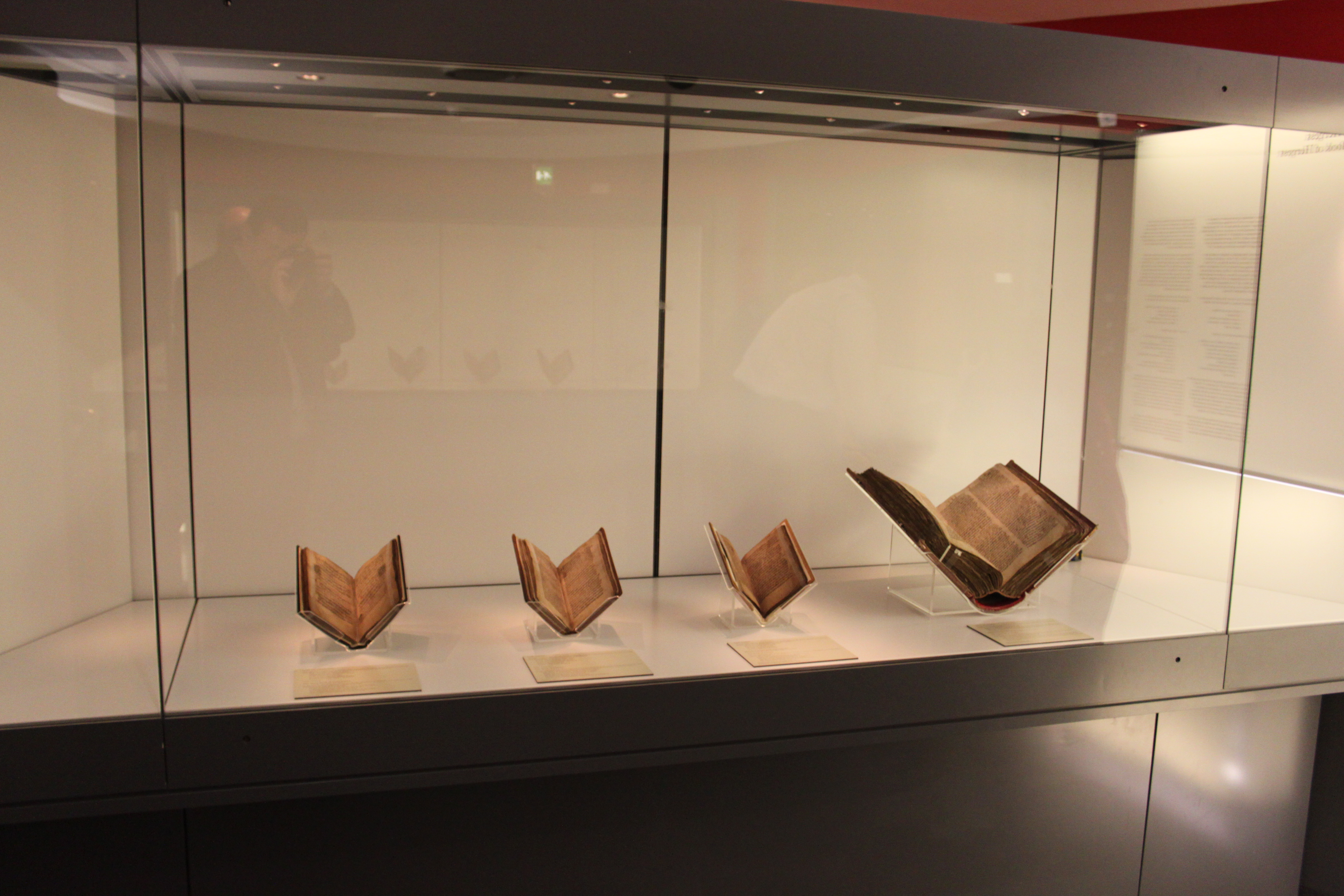
The Four Ancient Books of Wales on display at the National Library of Wales in 2013. Many early Welsh texts are preserved in these books.

Because the earliest literature that might reasonably be called Welsh rather than Brittonic or Celtic would still have been entirely oral, that which has survived represents only those examples and fragments which were written down. The surviving manuscripts are in many cases likely to be copies of earlier manuscripts now lost, and may have been produced some time after the works they contain would have been originally composed. Dating the earliest Welsh literature with any precision is thus fraught with difficulty: the extent to which these texts can or should be accepted as genuine examples of literature from the earliest periods relies on linguistic and other evidence. In many cases differences in language support an earlier origin, but definitive claims as to age remain somewhat speculative; and even when a text may plausibly attributed in the main to an earlier period later modifications and additions cannot be ruled out. Similar difficulties affect many other vernacular European literatures, such as that of Irish, and to a greater or lesser degree apply to most of the major Welsh texts of the medieval period, including the Mabinogion.

The earliest known examples of written Old Welsh are marginalia, such as the Surexit memorandum in Latin manuscripts such as the Juvencus Manuscript. Besides these early fragments, approximately 80 manuscripts entirely or substantially in Welsh have survived from the medieval period, all of which were produced during the 13th–15th century. Perhaps the most important are those sometimes referred to as the Four Ancient Books of Wales:

- Llyfr Du Caerfyrddin (The Black Book of Carmarthen)
- Llyfr Taliesin (The Book of Taliesin)
- Llyfr Aneirin (The Book of Aneirin)
- Llyfr Coch Hergest (The Red Book of Hergest)

which between them contain most of the major literary works of the medieval period in Welsh. None of these books was produced earlier than the 13th century, however it is accepted that much of their contents is likely to be considerably older.

If common estimates for the original composition of key texts are accepted, then the oldest Welsh literature has can be dated to the 6th century. Two sets of englynion written in the 9th century, part of the marginalia of the Latin Juvencus Manuscript, are usually accepted to be the earliest-written example of Welsh literature.

Welsh poetry of the mediaeval period is usually divided into three chronological stages. The first is that of the Cynfeirdd ('Early Poets'), covering poetry from the 6th to 11th centuries; this was followed by the period of Beirdd y Tywysogion ('The Poets of the Princes') or Gogynfeirdd (lit. 'Somewhat Early Poets') in the 12th and 13th centuries; and finally Beirdd yr Uchelwyr, ('The Poets of the Nobles') from the 14th century to the early part of the 16th. Additionally, storytelling practices were continuous throughout the Middle Ages in Wales; the surviving body of medieval Welsh prose literature (in the form of the Mabinogion) is generally believed to date to the period straddling the first two of these poetic periods.

=== Early poets (Cynfeirdd), 6th–10th centuries ===
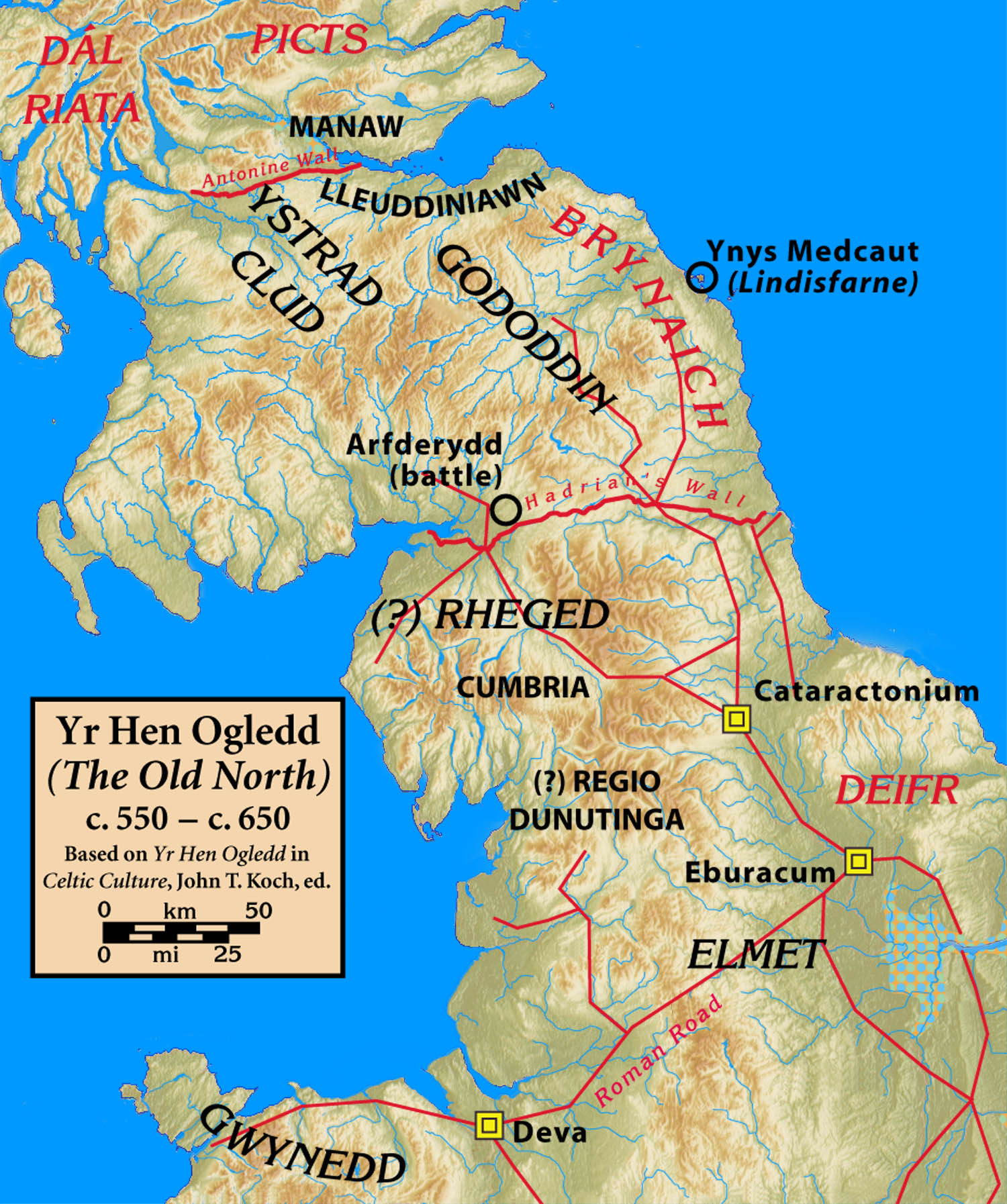
A map of Yr Hen Ogledd, 'The Old North', namely the Brittonic kingdoms of northwest Britain in which the earliest Welsh literature has its origins.

An interesting feature of much of the earliest Welsh poetry is that it was produced outside modern day Wales in areas that are now part of England and Southern Scotland. The earliest of the Cynfeirdd are associated with the area now referred to as Yr Hen Ogledd ('the 'Old North'), now Cumbria and Southern Scotland, and the language of this area time has sometimes been described as being Brittonic (a precursor to Modern Welsh), though is usually now characterised as Old Welsh and/or Cumbric. It is clear that there was considerable cultural transfer between modern Wales and this area even after the expanding Kingdom of Northumbria cut them off from one another. The names Taliesin and Aneirin are among five names mentioned by Welsh monk Nennius in the 9th century Latin Historia Brittonum as the greatest of the Britons' poets during the sixth century; and they are the earliest two plausibly historical figures to whom specific surviving texts are attributed. No surviving work can similarly be associated with the three other poets mentioned by Nennius, but later works from the 9th and 10th centuries are also considered part of the Cynfeirdd period, many anonymous but others incorrectly attributed to Aneirin or Taliesin or to characters such as Myrddin and Llywarch Hen.

==== Aneirin ====
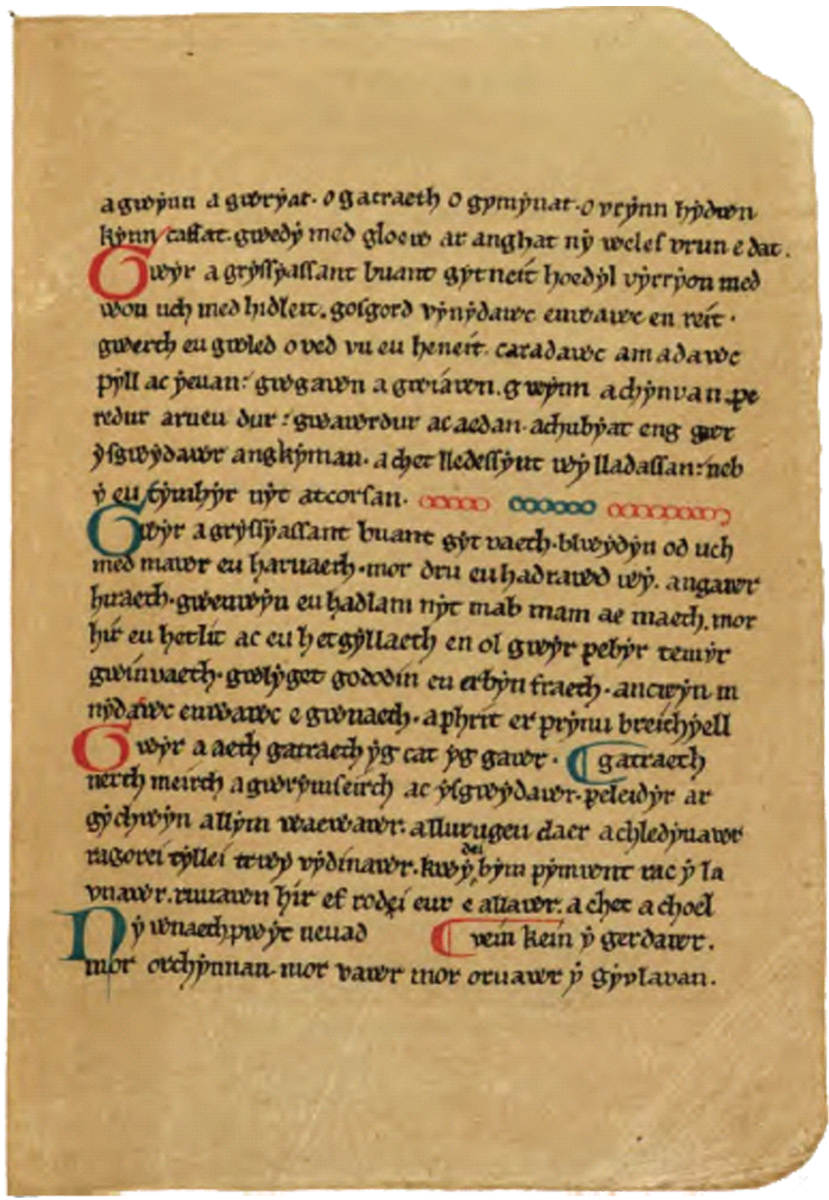
A page from Y Gododdin in the Book of Aneirin, believed to date to the 6th century.

The dominant theme of the earliest Welsh poetry is the panegyric: heroic, it serves to celebrate and commemorate heroes of battle and military success. This is the case with Y Gododdin, which, allowing for the chronological issues outlined above, may be the earliest surviving literary work in Welsh. The work, constituting about a thousand lines of poetry attributed to Aneirin, centres around the c.570 Battle of Catraeth (usually associated with Catterick) in which the eponymous 'Hen Ogledd' kingdom suffered a calamitous defeat against an unspecified foe (often assumed to be a neighbouring Anglo-Saxon kingdom, though this is not explicit in the text itself). Aneirin's perspective (as presented in the work itself) is that of an active participant in the battle. Though often referred to as an epic Y Gododdin is not strictly speaking a narrative work, consisting instead of a series of verse elegies, either to individual warriors killed in the battle or to the host as a whole. Although the battle is clearly depicted as a disastrous defeat in which the whole host is slaughtered, the tone is broadly valedictory and has been described as "unique in Welsh literature in that it is the only work that gives the heroic view of life full and unfettered expression, undiluted by other concepts". Although the work was forgotten after the end of the Middle Ages until its rediscovery in the 18th century, its literary value has long been recognised with numerous editions, translations and adaptations made. Although its form as a series of elegies deprives it of much sense of narrative and limits the range of ideas expressed, "it employs an immense variety of words, expressions, phrase and sentence formations, rhythms and metrical devices and even of imagery... the great verbal richness of the Gododdin cannot fail to astonish". Despite its heroic character, the often graphic depictions of violence and its aftermath have inspired many decidedly unromantic poetic treatments of conflict in later periods. Although an important and valuable work in its own right, Y Gododdin also contains what is usually interpreted as a passing reference to King Arthur, which if original makes it the earliest literary reference to the figure in any language; though it is impossible to definitively prove that this is a genuine 6th century element rather than a later addition.

==== Taliesin ====
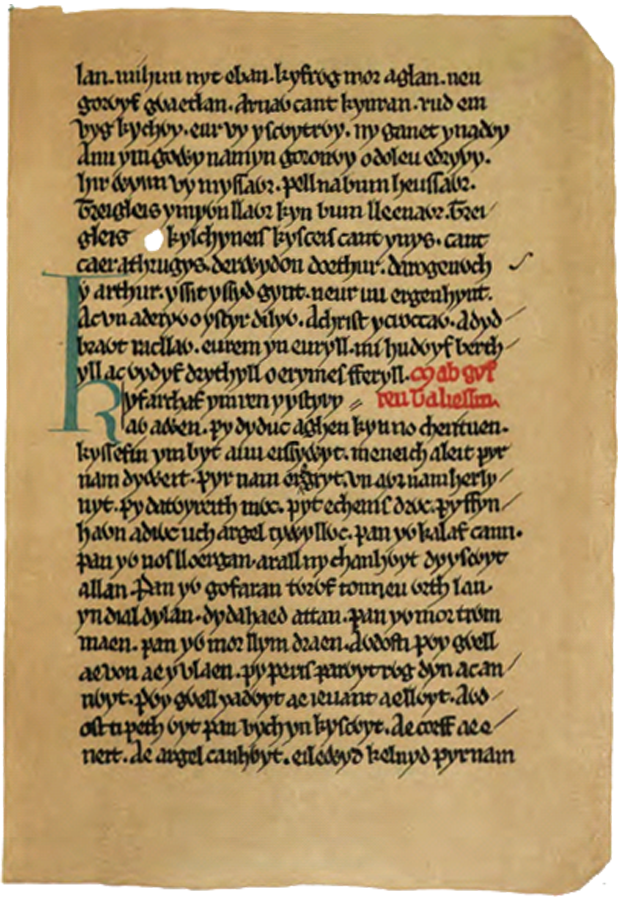
A page from the Book of Taliesin, in which the works attributed to the eponymous poet are preserved.

In addition to Aneirin, another of the poets mentioned by Nennius, Taliesin, also may be a genuine historical figure. Centuries later Taliesin would become a legendary figure associated with Arthur and a mythology of his own, as depicted in Hanes Taliesin ('The Tale of Taliesin'), and the majority of the material attributed to Taliesin such as Armes Prydain, Preiddeu Annwfn and Cad Goddeu (see below) is generally considered to date from many centuries after the historical Taliesin would have lived. Nevertheless, eleven of the poems in the Book of Taliesin are considered to be of plausibly 6th century origin. These place the possible historical Taliesin, like Aneirin, in the 'Old North' where he is believed to have been the court poet of Urien Rheged, to whom (as well as his son Owain ab Urien) a number of his poems refer, particularly their battlefield exploits. This focus on a poet's patron, fully formed in the Taliesin poems, characterises a significant proportion of medieval Welsh poetry and though Aneirin's work is now usually regarded as being the slightly earlier of the two, it is Taliesin that came to occupy a special position as "Taliesin Ben Beirdd" ('Taliesin Chief of Poets'), being "regarded both as the first and the most eminent of the [Cynfeirdd]; he was a founder poet and stood at the beginning of a tradition which lasted for a thousand years". This position as the founder-figure of the Welsh literary tradition persists to this day, as alluded to for example in the title of Emyr Humphreys's 1983 study of the relationship between Welsh literature and Welsh identity, The Taliesin Tradition. During the Middle Ages dozens of later poems were falsely attributed to him, and allusions to him litter the work of poets centuries later. He would eventually accumulate a mythos which attributed to him various magical powers, as depicted in the prose work Hanes Taliesin (recorded in the 16th century but likely based on traditions dating to between the 10th and 12th; see below). The significance of the historical Taliesin, assuming he even existed, is thus difficult to disentangle from the wider legend that became associated with the character. Nevertheless, the poems attributed to him which are believed to be written in the 6th century show the "taut perfection" of their author's craftsmanship and "his disciplined control over language and metre."

Structurally, neither Aneirin nor Taliesin's poems are in true cynghanedd, the strict rules of which would not be formalised until much later; however, by the standards of Latin or modern English poetry the work of both poets shows considerable stylistic intricacy, and when compared to other early European literature show a notable density of alliteration, repetition of consonant clusters and internal rhyme – all features of what would later become the strict metres.

==== Canu'r Bwlch: Llywarch Hen and Heledd (9th century) ====
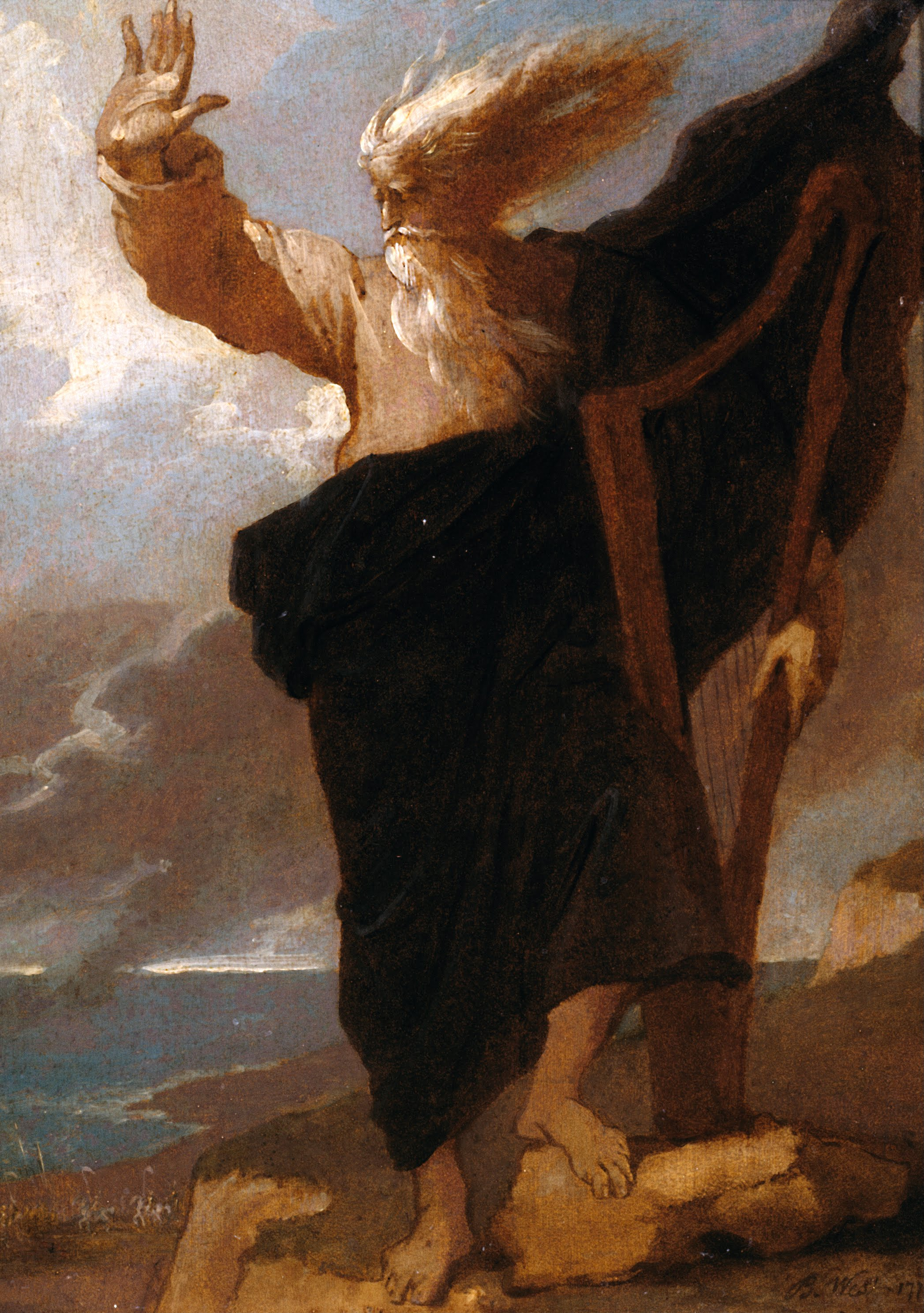
The Bard (1778) by Benjamin West

It was once believed that a gap of five centuries existed between the 6th-century Poets of the Princes period (see below) at the start of the 12th century. This is no longer the case, with a number of works now believed to have been composed between these two points, especially the later part of the period. These works had previously been either unknown or incorrectly attributed to Aneirin, Taliesin, their contemporaries, or to poets from the later Princes period. The term Canu'r Bwlch, ('The Poetry of the Gap') is sometimes used to refer to this grouping within the broader Cynfeirdd period. They are preserved in sources such as the Book of Taliesin, the Black Book of Carmarthen or the Red Book of Hergest along with other lesser manuscripts.

The most substantial and best-known works among the Canu'r Bwlch are two cycles of englynion, namely the Llywarch Hen and Heledd cycles. They purport to depict the Kingdom of Powys during the 7th century and though once believed to have been written by a contemporary of Aneirin and Taliesin, there is now a broad consensus they were probably composed during the 9th. Some propose a tenth-century date for the Heledd text however, and others that parts of the Llywarch cycle may be later still. Each cycle consists of a series of englynion in the voices of their respective eponymous protagonists: Llywarch Hen, a prince from the Hen Ogledd attested in various genealogies who may well have existed and only later became associated with Powys, and Heledd ferch Cyndrwyn, a princess of Powys known only from literary sources. Both texts are found in both the White Book of Rhydderch and the Red Book of Hergest, and though there is no suggestion they were both written by the same poet they are somewhat similar to one another in character: both are monologues expressing the narrator's sorrow and affliction at the loss of the eastern portion of Powys (what is now Shropshire) to the English (a fact which itself supports the theory of an origin in the 9th century when relations between Powys and Mercia were strained, having been relatively peaceful during the 7th century). In addition to this mournful character, they are also works where nature is an important background element, reflecting the main action and feelings of the poetry itself. Though the panegyric element is not far from the surface in either cycle, with Llywarch eulogising his losts sons and Heledd her brothers, especially Cynddylan (also the subject of an earlier poem, see below), the bleak and reflective tone of both cycles contrasts with the valedictory tone struck by Aneirin and Taliesin. The Heledd cycle is notable for being written from a female perspective, though as its authorship is uncertain it is impossible to definitively say it was written by a woman. The original form in which this poetry, sometimes referred to as the 'Welsh Saga Poetry', would have been presented is uncertain: both cycles seems to take place within an ongoing story and it has been suggested the poems may have originally interspersed sections of prose narrative (as in the case of some contemporary Irish cycles) which have since been lost; alternatively the bard or storyteller ('Cyfarwydd') may have extemporised the narrative sections, or perhaps the audience's familiarity with the story would simply have been assumed. A third, less well known englyn cycle to Urien Rheged has also survived, which may also have had a similar original form.

==== Other Canu'r Bwlch poetry (7th–11th centuries) ====
Alongside the larger works described above, a number of shorter works produced in the later part of the Cynfeirdd period are of significant historical, academic and/or literary interest. Among the smallest but most remarkable of these works is Pais Dinogaid, 'Dinogaid's Smock', interpolated as a stanza of the Gododdin in the Book of Aneirin but clearly an independent work. Believed to date to the early 7th century, it is a 17-line lullaby from a mother to her child and unquestionably the earliest example in Welsh of children's literature and "probably unique among the modern literatures of Europe at such an early date". As it predates the Heledd poems (see above) it thus also the earliest Welsh work depicting an explicitly female perspective, though it remains a work of unknown authorship. Another work associated with Yr Hen Ogledd, it has been used to suggest evidence for the presence of certain animal species in Britain in the Early Middle Ages.

A second poem also interpolated as a stanza of the Gododdin describes the independently attested c.642 Battle of Strathcarron against Dal Riada, and may be the only surviving work of literature produced in the Kingdom of Strathclyde. Two other poems may also date from the seventh century, which if so would make them the earliest works originating within the modern borders of Wales: Moliant Cadwallon ('The Praise of Cadwallon') and Marwnad Cynddylan ('Elegy for Cynddylan'). The second of these is unusual for the period in being attributed to a specific poet, whose name was Meigant, although beyond this name nothing else is known.

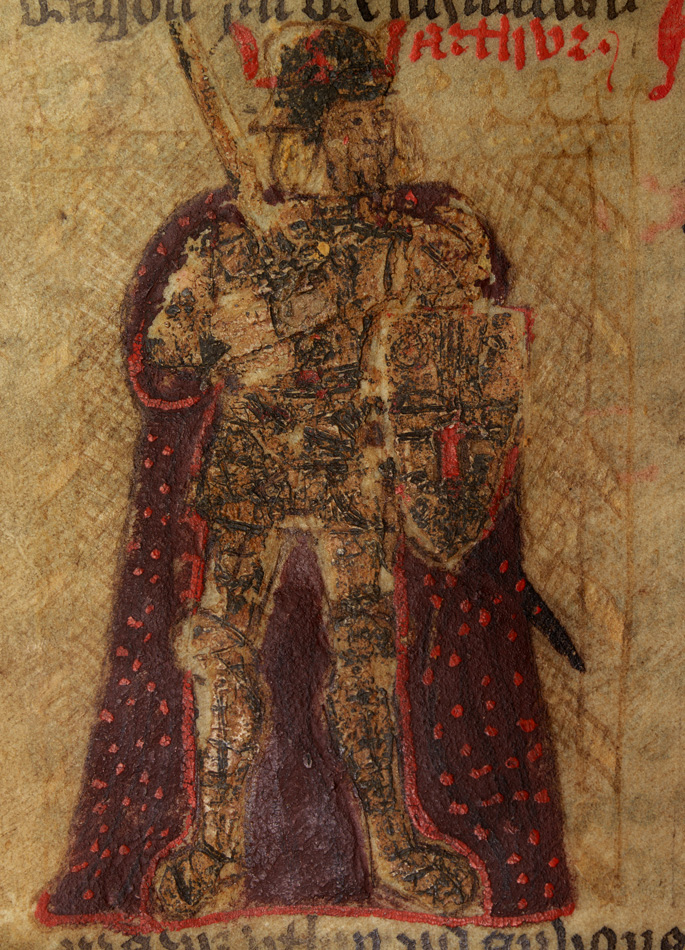
15th century depiction of King Arthur by an unknown Welsh scribe.

King Arthur may have been mentioned as far back as the 6th century Gododdin (see above), but by the later part of the Canu'r Bwlch period he was clearly an established part of Welsh poetic tradition. His earliest undisputed appearance (not yet as a King) is in the (Latin) 9th century Historia Brittonum, and by the 10th and 11th centuries poems and stories about him were circulating in Welsh, of which a handful have survived. Many were originally attributed to Taliesin, though are now agreed to be later works dating to the end of the Cynfeirdd period. These are the earliest literary works in to feature the character, in any language. Among them are Pa Ŵr yw'r Porthor? ('Who is the Gatekeeper?'), introducing the formidable Glewlwyd Gafaelfawr, Arthur's gatekeeper, unique to the Welsh Arthurian tradition; Marwnad Uthr Pen ('The Elegy of Uther Pendragon"), which refers to Arthur's valour and is suggestive of a father-son relationship for Arthur and Uther that pre-dates Geoffrey of Monmouth; and Preiddeu Annwfn ('The Spoils of Annwfn'). This last poem depicts a quest by Arthur into Annwfn to seek a magical cauldron which has historically been speculated to be the oldest form of the Grail Legend, though some scholars dispute this.

Another poem from the period Armes Prydain, ('The Prophecy of Britain') does not feature Arthur but represents the first appearance of the idea of the Mab Darogan ('Son of Prophecy'), which would later become strongly associated with Arthur. The poem, which appears in the Book of Taliesin and was long attributed to that poet, is now believed to date to the 10th century and to represent the earliest example of the Welsh tradition of canu brut (prophecy poetry), of which there are ten further examples in the Book of Taliesin dating from the 10th and 11th centuries. It has been suggested that Armes Prydain may have been written in frustration at the appeasement policies of Hywel Dda. The poem depicts an alliance between the various cultures of the British Isles – Irish, Viking and the Welsh of both Wales and Strathclyde – to drive back the Anglo-Saxons; in this context, the Mab Darogan ('Son of Prophecy') is a pseudo-messianic figure who will save the Welsh nation in its hour of need. A similar idea would become a significant part of the Arthurian tradition, though no native Welsh text from the Middle Ages directly connects Arthur to the concept, which is more commonly invoked with reference to historical figures like Owain Glyndŵr and Henry Tudor. Although difficult to interpret it is a work of "sustained vigour" and is a powerful early example of a particular stream in Welsh poetry that would remain popular for centuries.

Dating to the same period are approximately seven poems (allowing for some ambiguous cases) depicting or associated with the character of Myrddin Wyllt, among them the englyn-sequence Cyfoesi Myrddin a Gwenddydd ei Chwaer. Variously portrayed as a poet or sorcerer but also a wild man, he was later, via Geoffrey of Monmouth, combined with various other figures and inserted into the Arthur legend as Merlin. These early Myrddin Wyllt poems are notable for pre-dating this Arthurian association. Another poem depicts a conversation between Myrddin and Taliesin, showing how that possibly historical figure had already become entwined with myth.

Englynion y Beddau ('The Englynion of the Graves') probably dates to the same period. Taking the form of a poetic list recording the locations where various heroic and legendary figures are buried (with Arthur's burial site being tantalisingly listed as one of the world's mysteries).

A number of other major and minor poems from the last centuries of the Cynfeirdd period have survived, which show albeit in fragmentary glimpses the various ways Welsh poetry was continuing to develop in style and content. These include religious poems and even a small quantity of nature poetry, though considering its importance in both earlier and later periods surprisingly little of the panegyric verse which so characterises much of Medieval Welsh poetry: "we have no euologies or elegies for such eminent royal figures as Merfyn Frych, Rhodri Mawr and Hywel Dda."

=== Poets of the Princes (Beirdd y Tywysogion), c. 1100 – 1300 ===
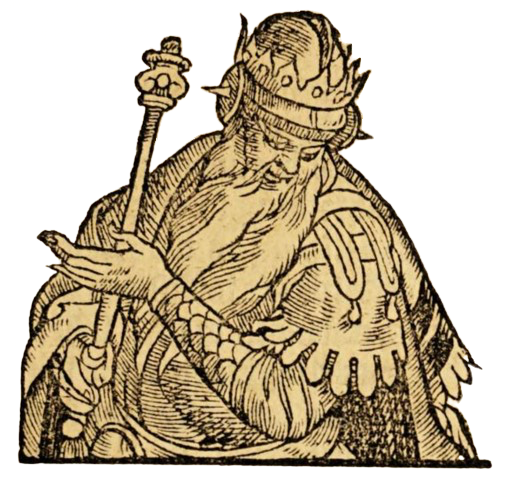
Gruffydd ap Cynan (c.1081–1137) as fancifully depicted in the 16th-century Historie of Cambria.

The arrival of the Normans in Britain in the later part of the 11th century represented an existential crisis for Welsh political independence, though under leaders such as Gruffydd ap Cynan (c.1081–1137) Owain Gwynedd (d.1170), Llywelyn the Great (c. 1173–1240) and Llywelyn ap Gruffudd (d. 1282) in Gwynedd and Rhys ap Gruffudd (1155–1197) in Deheubarth the Welsh would hold out against what became the Anglo-Norman Kingdom of England for another two centuries. Nevertheless, the political and cultural influences brought to Britain by the Normans had a significant impact in Wales, bringing an end to a period of comparative isolation and opening the country up to a range of continental influences. It has also been suggested that the existential threat the Normans represented may itself have had a galvanising affect on Welsh literature. By now an explicitly Welsh identity (as distinct from Brittonic) had formed, aided by the loss of Yr Hen Ogledd over the previous centuries, though the term Cymry (Welsh) only begins appearing slowly, and many texts well into the Early Modern period continue to use the terms Brythoniaid (Britons) and Cymry (Welsh) interchangeably. It is also during this period that the language developed into Middle Welsh. The same approximate date is taken as dividing the earlier Cynfeirdd period with the second period in Medieval Welsh literature, that of the Poets of the Princes which is the period from c. 1100 until the conquest of Wales by King Edward I of England in 1282–83.

The term 'Poets of the Princes' (Welsh: Beirdd y Tywysogion) is now generally preferred to the once common Gogynfeirdd (lit. 'Somewhat Early Poets'), with which it is synonymous. It emphasises the key relationship to the poets of this period with the Princes, especially of Gwynedd. The interest of the highest tiers of Welsh society in these matters is attested in various historical texts; for example Gruffydd ap Cynan (c. 1055–1137), King of Gwynedd, is accredited with reforming the bardic tradition and with holding an Eisteddfod, though the precise nature of these reforms and this event (and its date) is lost. A later event held in Cardigan in 1176 under the auspices of the Lord Rhys of Deheubarth is usually considered to be the first definitively documented Eisteddfod. According to the historical document known as Brut y Tywysogion, Lord Rhys announced the event a year in advance, "throughout Wales, England, Scotland, Ireland and the other islands", which suggests the event was on an unprecedented scale. It was held at Cardigan Castle over Christmas of 1176. According to the 1770 'History of Wales' "a great feast" was held and "many hundreds of English, Normans, and others coming to Aberteifi [Cardigan], were very honourably received, and courteously entertained by Prince Rhys... Rhys called all the bards or poets throughout all Wales to come thither... the bards being seated, they were to answer each other in rhyme." Rhys awarded two chairs as prizes, one for the winner of the poetry competition and the other for music. The poetry chair went to a bard from Gwynedd.

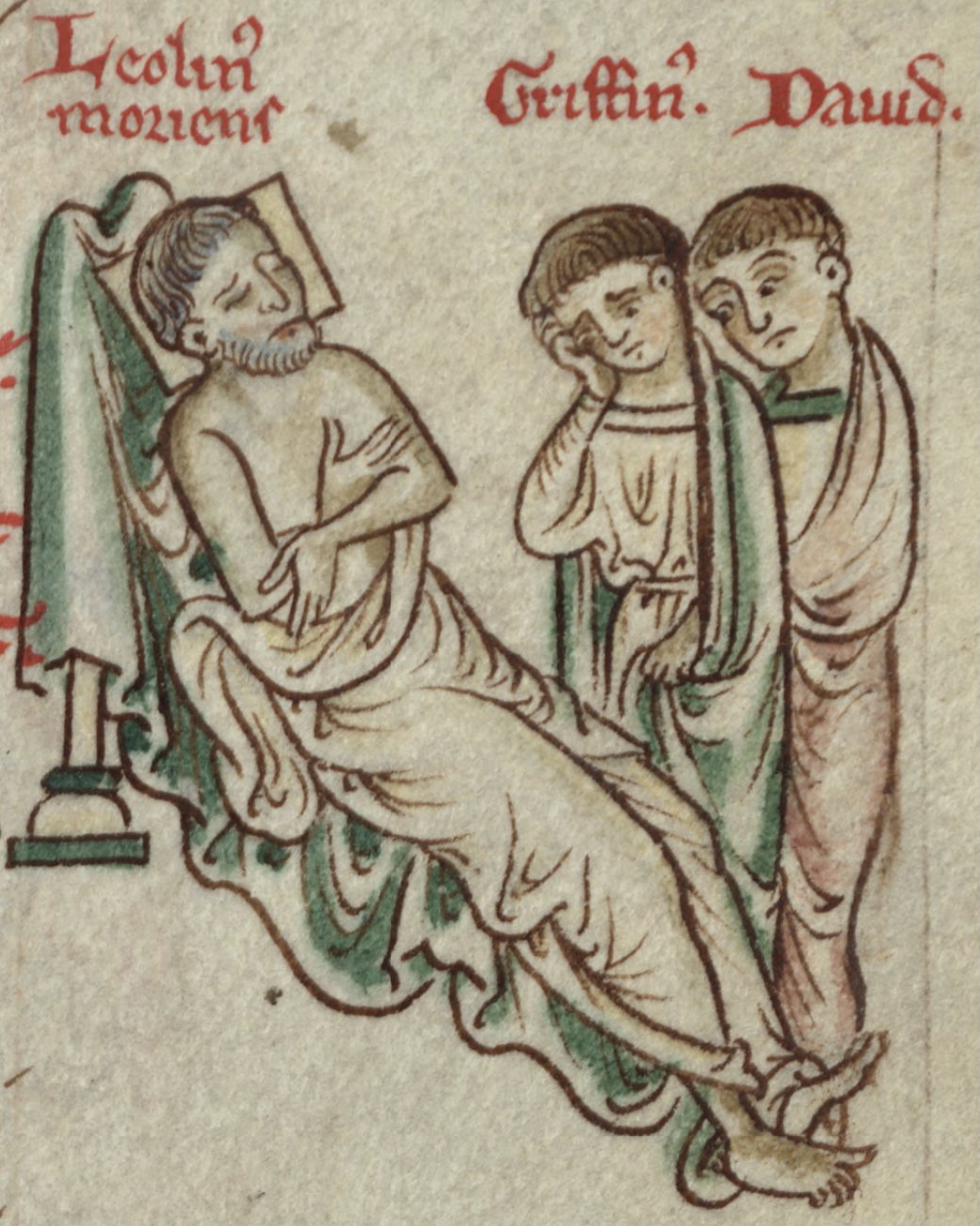
A contemporary depiction of Llywelyn Fawr of Gwynedd (c. 1173–1240), one of the Welsh Princes who was a patron of the 'Poets of the Princes' period, and his sons.

Cyfraith Hywel – medieval Welsh law – describes the important social role of the poet in Welsh society in the Middle Ages. Poetry provided a means for wealthy princes and nobles to signal their prestige, to record victories, and to preserve knowledge of lineages and traditions, as well as preserving the social hierarchy. The poet would compose praise poetry for his patron and his household, eleg(ies) on his death celebrating his generosity and battlefield exploits. In this respect the work of the poets represents the direct continuation of the panegyric tradition of Aneirin, Taliesin, and presumably earlier figures (see above); though with a broader focus on a subject's lineage, his character, his possessions and peace-time exploits rather than merely his battlefield prowess. Cyfraith Hywel describes the bards as a professional class of poets, retained as part of the household of Welsh Kings or Princes and granted significant freedoms and protections in return for their services. There is record of "Bardic schools", although these probably involved a process of apprenticeship with a senior poet rather than establishments of learning, and bardic hierarchies by which an apprentice poet might aspire to the status of first bardd teulu ('family poet') and utimately pencerdd (chief poet) through some process of examination. As with many professions, poetry would be passed down within families. Poets were also performers, who would entertain a mainly illiterate society with songs and recitations to accompaniment of a harp, often provided by the poet himself, though absent a system of musical notation this music has been lost. By the end of the medieval period multiple 'Bardic Grammars' had been produced outlining the rules and expectations of poetry and formally outlining the system known as cynghanedd. Whilst cynghanedd appears only occasionally in the earliest poetry of the period, over the course of the two centuries this increases such that a poem from the end of the period, such as the famous elegy to Llywelyn ap Gruffudd (d.1282) by Gruffudd ab yr Ynad Coch, a poem of 104 lines, is entirely in a fully formed system of cynghanedd fundamentally the same as that used by strict metre poets today.

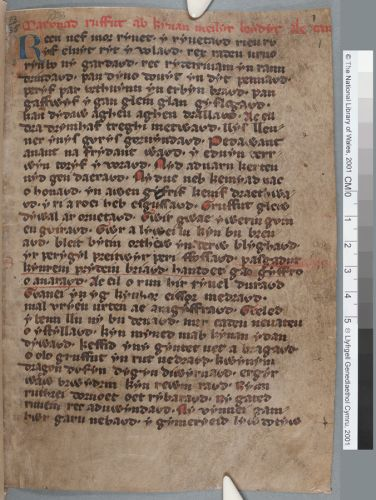
A page from the 13th-century Hendregadredd Manuscript

In comparison to the Cynfeirdd period a relatively large body of poetry by the Poets of the Princes survives, which has been described as a "splendid corpus of verse". Unlike the Cynfeirdd poets, few of whom are named and many of whose status as historical persons is doubtful, most of the Poets of the Princes are named in their manuscripts, which include the Black Book of Carmarthen and Red Book of Hergest but also the Hendregadredd Manuscript, a deliberately created compilation of the poets of the period; and nothing is known about many of these figures beyond their names, in some cases there are biographical details which can be added. Among the notable Poets of the Princes were figures such as Meilyr Brydydd (fl. 1100–1137) Cynddelw Brydydd Mawr (fl. c. 1155–1195), Llywarch ap Llywelyn (fl.1173–1220), Einion ap Gwalchmai (fl. 1202–1223), Dafydd Benfras (fl. 1230–1260), Bleddyn Fardd (fl. c. 1258 – 1284) and Gruffudd ab yr Ynad Coch (fl. 1277–1282). Whilst the vast majority of the Poets of the Princes were professional poets, at least two are noted for being Princes themselves – Hywel ab Owain Gwynedd (c. 1120–1170/1171) and Owain Cyfeiliog of Powys (d.1197).

Although the bulk of the poetry belongs in the panegyric genre of praise, eulogy and elegy, of which a typical example would be the "majestic" eulogy to Gruffudd ap Cynan by Meilyr Brydydd. there exist also occasional love poems, nature poems, religious poems, and prophecy. The poetry is replete with references to the wider Welsh literary tradition, for example direct references to the Gododdin in a poem by Owain Cyfeiliog; but also makes frequent use of Biblical imagery, allusions to heaven, Jesus, Saints (particularly Welsh ones) as well as a number of poems on religious themes (among them praise poems to God in the Welsh panegyric mold) also suggest a self-consciously Christian society with a keen interest in spiritual matters. In contrast to the poems of the Cynfeirdd period, the Poetry of the Princes also features many references to poets like Homer and Ovid and to historical and classical figures like Alexander the Great and Herakles, suggesting that rather than being isolated this was a literary tradition aware of its place in a wider world and firmly connected to it. The existence of a lower order of poets who wrote "lesser" poetry (perhaps bawdy material in the free metres) is alluded to in contemporary sources, though sadly none survives from this period; satire, however, though considered of a lower status, was considered a part of the poet's armoury and satirical poems survive by poets such as Llywarch ap Llywelyn.

Among these poets as a group, some individual names stand out. Cynddelw Brydydd Mawr (fl. c. 1155–1195), a native of Powys who served many of the major Princes of his day including Llywelyn Fawr, stands out as one of these poets of whom the most work has been preserved, a fact which alongside his name, which means 'Cynddelw the Great Poet', suggests that he was considered a poet of particular distinction in his own time. Like many poets he would also fight himself in his patrons' armies and some of his poems describe these experiences; alongside the expected odes and eulogies to his patrons there are also religious poems, a love poem, a eulogy to his own son, and – a genre that would become popular – a deathbed poem, effectively a eulogy to himself. Although a rather a conservative and somewhat formulaic poet, he has also been described as capable of "sheer lyricism, quiet meditation or deep-felt tensions... expressed with all the resources of his bardic skill."

Though only a handful of poems by Hywel ab Owain Gwynedd (c. 1120–1170/1171) have been preserved, he is a significant poet. As a Prince himself, he was freed from the need to write poetry other than according to his own whims; he is consequently the first notable writer of love poetry in Welsh and in some respects anticipates Dafydd ap Gwilym (see below). He has been named by at least one critic as one of the greatest poets of any period in Welsh.

Perhaps the best known of all the poems of this period however is associated with the end of the period itself: the elegy by Gruffudd ab yr Ynad Coch to Llywelyn ap Gruffudd, his patron, and the last Prince of an independent Wales. Although in form it is an elegy like many others from the period, its extremely bleak imagery and masterful use of cynghanedd throughout has led to its being described as "the most powerful expression in the language of dismay and unrelieved black despair" and "at the same time a miracle of art". "Several religious poems of great descriptive power and eloquence" have also been attributed to the poet. As well as its artistic value, the poem's content shows an awareness that a political era was coming to an end.

=== The Mabinogion ===
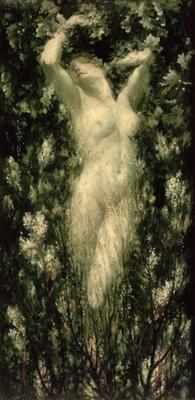
Blodeuwedd (1930) by Christopher Williams, depicting a figure from Math fab Mathonwy, the Fourth Branch of the Mabinogi

The earliest Welsh prose stories are roughly contemporaneous with the Beirdd y Tywysogion period in poetry. Mentioned in Cyfraith Hywel alongside poets were cyfarwyddiaid (sing. cyfarwydd), or storytellers. These were also professional, paid artists, but unlike the poets they seem to have remained anonymous. It is not clear whether these storytellers were a wholly separate, popular-level class, or whether some of the bards practised storytelling as part of their repertoire. Comparatively little of this prose work has survived, especially in comparison to prose from the same period in Irish, but it provides the earliest British prose literature. These native Welsh stories (alongside some hybrids with French/Norman influence) are usually collectively referred to today as the Mabinogion, the plural form of the singular Mabinogi, which strictly only refers to four of the eleven tales. The name became established in the 19th century, but is based on a linguistic error; more neutral and accurate terms such as "Native Middle Welsh Prose Tales" are sometimes preferred, but Mabinogion has proven persistent and is used here according to this convention.

The collection consists of eleven prose stories recorded in both the White Book of Rhydderch and the Red Book of Hergest, both compiled in the 14th century. The original dates of composition for the tales in the Mabinogion have been much debated, a range from 1050 to 1225 being proposed, with the consensus being that they are to be dated to the late 11th and 12th centuries, with elements possibly older. A twelfth story, Hanes Taliesin ('The History of Taliesin'), is sometimes included, for example in the influential collection of the Victorian English translator Lady Charlotte Guest, but while it is of undoubted medieval origins it was recorded centuries later and is not found in the White or Red Books, and is typically considered separate to the eleven core stories. These can be subdivided into:

- The Four Branches of the Mabinogi (Pedair Cainc y Mabinogi), which form a loose sequence:
  - Pwyll Pendefig Dyfed ('Pwyll, Prince of Dyfed')
  - Branwen ferch Llŷr ('Branwen, daughter of Llŷr')
  - Manawydan fab Llŷr ('Manawydan, son of Llŷr')
  - Math fab Mathonwy ('Math, son of Mathonwy')
- The native tales:
  - Breuddwyd Macsen Wledig ('The Dream of Macsen Wledig')
  - Lludd a Llefelys ('Lludd and Llefelys')
  - Culhwch ac Olwen ('Culhwch and Olwen')
  - Breuddwyd Rhonabwy ('The Dream of Rhonabwy')
  - Hanes Taliesin ('The History of Taliesin') is included here, though as noted above is of a later prominence
- The Three Welsh Romances: Welsh versions of Arthurian tales that also appear in the work of Chrétien de Troyes, though they are not translations and include different material; it is proposed they may derive from a common origin.
  - Owain, neu Iarlles y Ffynnon ('Owain, or the Countess (or Lady) of the Fountain')
  - Peredur fab Efrog ('Peredur, son of Efrawg')
  - Geraint ac Enid ('Geraint and Enid')

The stories are extremely varied in tone, content and style. Battles and violence feature strongly, but characters are also seen achieving goals through cunning and wit, and there is a good deal of humour and satirical material contained within the stories. Magical features include sorcerers, witches, giants, enchantments, the Otherworld known as Annwfn and talking animals; Lludd a Llefelys includes the earliest depiction of dragons in Welsh literature and Breuddwyd Rhonabwy includes an extremely early fictional depiction of time travel. Though they are fantastic literature rather than being in any sense historical, the tales feature many onomastic or etiological elements connecting the stories with specific places in Wales, as well as in England. Five of the eleven tales feature King Arthur in some degree, though he is not the central character in any of them. Culhwch ac Olwen was commonly held to be the earliest Arthurian tale and one of Wales's earliest extant prose texts, though this has since been disputed.

Although the Mabinogion are often discussed as representing a body of Welsh mythology and sometimes (particularly the Four Branches, which are believed to be the oldest) purported to consist of, or at least derive from, pre-Christian Celtic mythology, this has been strongly disputed by others who argue that they should be considered first and foremost products of a "medieval Welsh imagination". Although they are not in any real sense religious works, they contain many references to Christian concepts such as God, Heaven, Communion and churches among other things, as does the mass of Welsh literature going back to Aneirin and Taliesin (see above), emphasising that these were the products of a medieval Christian society rather than Pagan pre-Christian Celts. Regardless of their origins they are "some of the greatest works of literature produced in [Welsh] during the Middle Ages", and among the most famous, influential and widely read literary works in Welsh of any period in history.

Although they are not direct translations, the Three Romances are Arthurian tales that weave native elements into versions of stories by Chrétien de Troyes. Also found among the Welsh medieval manuscripts are Welsh versions of a number of other prose stories from the wider European tradition, such as Amlyn ac Amig (a version of Amis et Amiles) and a number of other tales concerning Charlemagne. These translations, which in some cases convert verse originals into prose, are nowhere near as well known as the native tales making up the Mabinogion; however, it has been claimed that they contain some of the best prose of the Middle Ages.

=== Other literary works of the Middle Ages ===
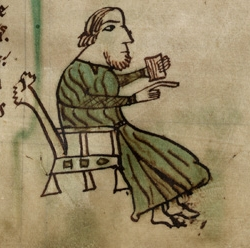
13th-century depiction of a Welsh judge in one of the manuscripts containing Cyfraith Hywel.

Welsh literature in the Middle Ages also included a substantial body of legal texts that have become (perhaps incorrectly) associated with the 10th-century king Hywel Dda (Hywel the Good); as well as extensive genealogies, religious and mythical texts, histories, medical and gnomic lore, and scientific and practical works, in addition to literature translated from other languages such as Latin, Breton or French. Most of these fall outside the scope of this article; however beyond the conventional categories of poetry and creative prose of note are the distinctive Trioedd Ynys Prydein, 'The Triads of the Isle of Britain'. These short lists of (usually) three items may have been used as aids to memory. The earliest were written down in the 13th century, but as with many early Welsh texts they may have origins much earlier. They include amongst them many lists of heroic figures, many of whom are familiar from the Mabinogion, Gododdin and other early texts, but among them also are a large number not otherwise known in Welsh literature, a fact which alongside the knowledge that only a small fraction of medieval manuscripts survived to the modern period perhaps hints at a much larger body of stories than has survived in written form.

=== Poets of the Nobility (Beirdd yr Uchelwyr), c. 1300 – 1530 ===
The death of Llywelyn ap Gruffudd and his brother Dafydd in 1282 and 1283 and the subsequent absorption of their land into the Kingdom of England brought an end to the period of Welsh independence, and with it the age of the Princes. This crisis might have been expected to be disastrous for Welsh literature; however, the fourteenth and fifteenth centuries are widely perceived to represent a golden age in which the Welsh Poetic tradition reached new artistic and creative heights. The term Beirdd yr Uchelwyr, or 'Poets of the Nobility', is used to refer to this period; reflecting how the patronage which the poets had previously received from the Princes now came from a lower social level, the uchelwyr, a class of administrators and local dignitaries who managed the newly conquered Principality on behalf of the crown or the Marches on behalf of absentee landowners. These would later form the basis of the landed gentry in Wales. Monasteries represented an additional source of patronage. In practical terms this new arrangement allowed the tradition of professionalism to continue, but poets had less stability and could no longer be maintained by a single patron the year round, requiring them to move around Wales in search of work. This, and the fact poets needed to appeal to a larger pool of less aristocratic patrons, led to a creative innovation; and of particular significance was the development of the cywydd metre. The term cywyddwyr is sometimes used to refer to this school of poets, although it is misleading as the cywydd was only one of a wide variety of forms employed. Many of the uchelwyr also sponsored the creation of manuscripts like the Red Book of Hergest, in which the poetic tradition of the previous eight centuries were recorded; alongside these a considerable degree of contemporary material was preserved, with over 150 poets represented, including for the first time a number of women. Although much of this poetry, as with the previous generation, is in the strict metres, some free metre poetry is also recorded, though it continued to be considered a lower form of composition.

All changes took place slowly however and the division of Welsh medieval poetry into distinct 'Princes' and 'Uchelwyr' periods is somewhat artificial, with the two in reality overlapping, and having key points of similarity such as the continued importance of praise. The Uchelwyr period is considered to last from 1283 until the death of Tudur Aled, considered the last great Welsh poet of the medieval period, 1526.

==== Dafydd ap Gwilym (c. 1315/1320 – c. 1350/1370) ====
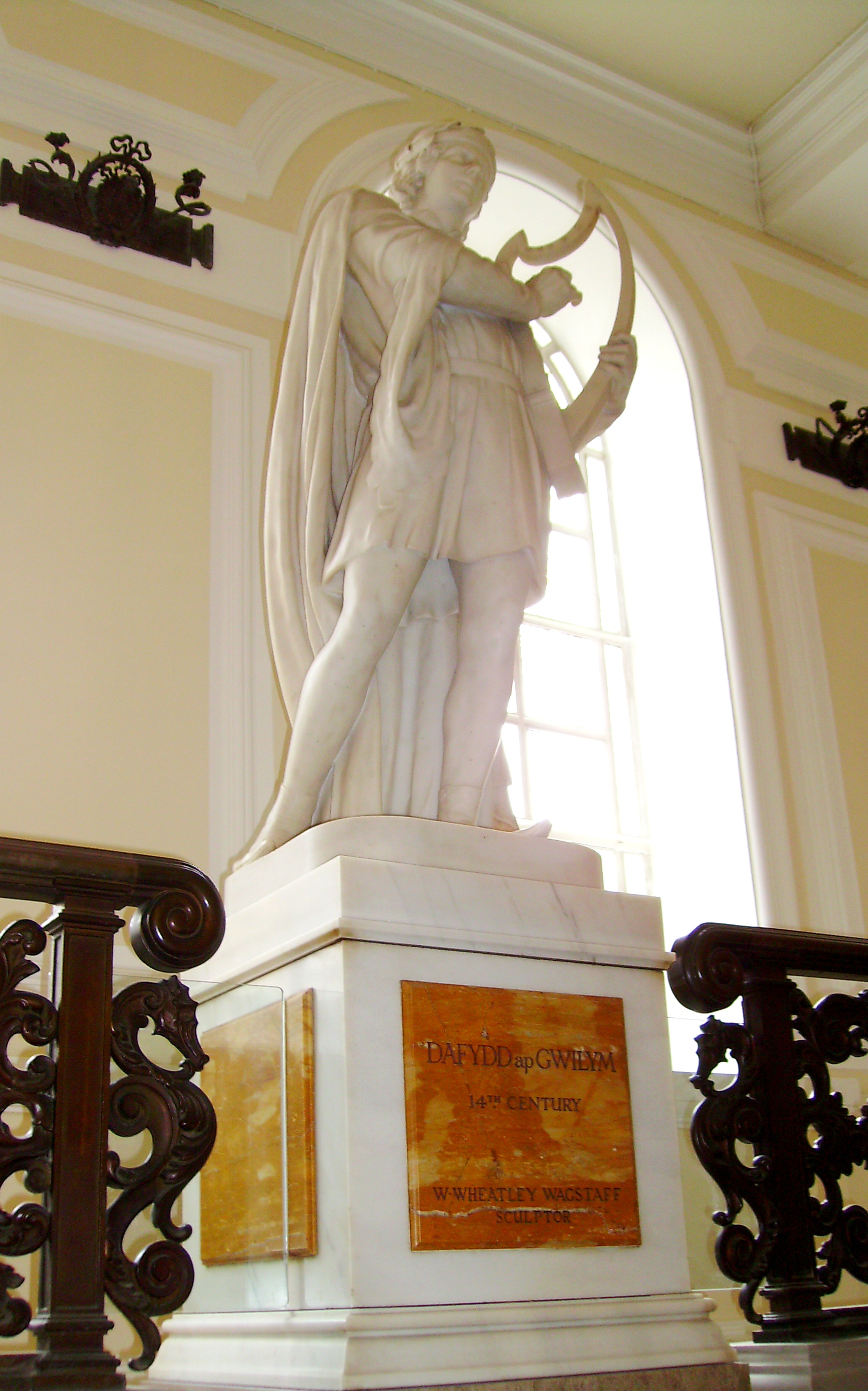
William Wheatley Wagstaff's fanciful 20th-century sculpture of Dafydd ap Gwilym, in Cardiff City Hall's Marble Gallery.

The first major poet associated with the Uchelwyr period was Dafydd ap Gwilym. Though many of the poems once attributed to him have later been shown to be either misattributions or forgeries, even on the strength of his genuine works he has been described a "supreme master" of the language and of the strict metres and he is frequently cited as one of the greatest figures of any period in Welsh literature with his poems representing "some of the most original and memorable literature produced in any European language during the medieval period." As with many medieval Welsh poets relatively little is known about his life beyond that he was originally from Ceredigion and died at a relatively young age, however his poetry is remarkable not just for its quality but for its breadth. Dafydd could produce praise poetry as well as any medieval poet, but he is particularly remembered for his love and nature poetry. Although he was not the first Welsh poet to explore these areas, Hywel ab Owain Gwynedd being an important predecessor from the Princes period for example, his work in the genres is far more substantial in breadth, variety and sheer quantity, and shows the synthesis of the aristocratic bardic tradition with both French love poetry and less elevated native verse. A particularly distinctive aspect of his verse is his playfulness: he wrote a number of poems to his lovers, Morfudd and Dyddgu, and in some poems refers to both women in the same poem; and his remarkable creativity is displayed in such diverse works as Trafferth Mewn Tafarn ('Trouble at the Inn'), a work of slapstick comedy describing a tryst that goes wrong (and all in the strict metres), the lewdly satirical Cywydd y Gal ('A Cywydd to the Penis'), and a poem to his own shadow. More than any other poet he was responsible for popularising the cywydd form, and he remains perhaps the most influential and best loved of all Welsh poets.

==== Other poets of the Uchelwyr period ====
Though undoubtedly the most significant, Dafydd ap Gwilym was only one of a number of major poets of the Uchelwyr period. Iolo Goch (c. 1325 – c. 1398) was another poet who turned the new cywydd form to the purposes of praising his patrons; his most famous work is a cywydd in praise of Owain Glyndŵr's home at Sycharth, remarkable for its level of detail. Siôn Cent (c. 1400 – 1430/45), traditionally associated with Breconshire, is primarily a religious poet, using the cywydd once again but this time to criticise the sins of this world in works such as I wagedd ac oferedd y byd (English: "To vanity and Futility"). Lewys Glyn Cothi (c. 1420 – 1490) from Carmarthenshire was one of the most prolific poets of the period, with over 230 works preserved, perhaps the most remarkable of which is a moving elegy to his five-year-old son. A supporter of the House of Lancaster during the Wars of the Roses, he also wrote a poem of praise to Henry Tudor. Guto'r Glyn (c. 1435 – c. 1493), associated with Glyn Ceiriog, Denbighshire, by contrast was a Yorkist, being a soldier-poet. Dafydd Nanmor (fl. 1450 – 1490), born at Nanmor (or Nantmor), Gwynedd, was another major poet to whom 20th-century critic Saunders Lewis attributed particular significance as a poet of ideas, praising the ideal ruler as one in whom privilege and power brought responsibilities towards family, community and nation.

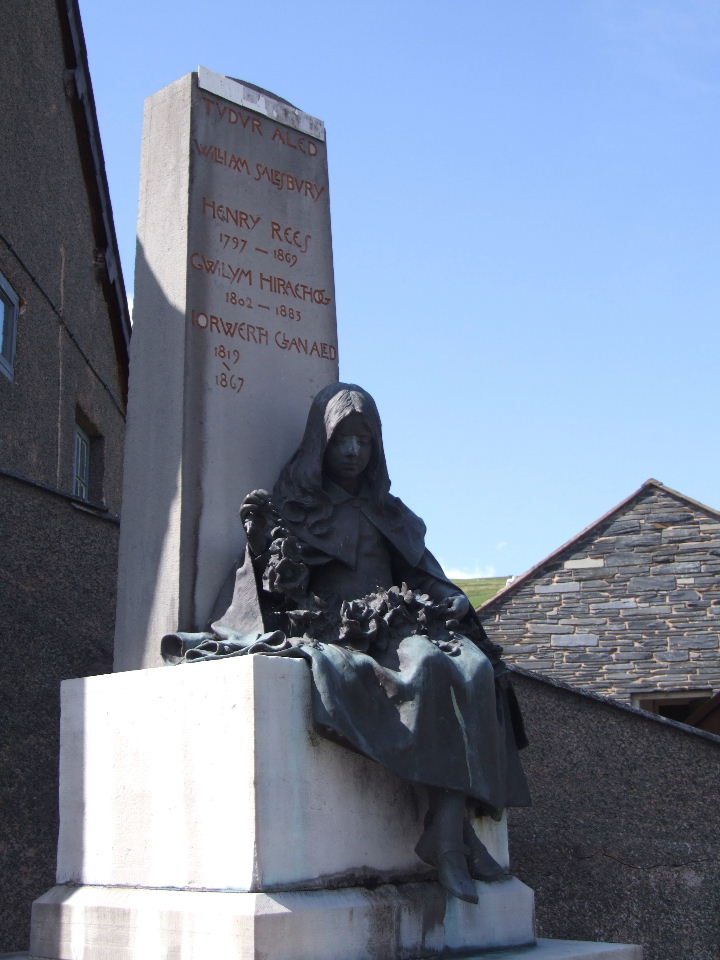
Monument known as "Yr Eneth" ("The Girl") in Llansannan, Conwy, commemorating a number of poets from the area including Tudur Aled.

Dafydd ab Edmwnd (fl. c. 1450–97) was another prolific poet who became most associated with the codification of the strict metres, defining the Pedwar Mesur ar Hugain ('Twenty Four Metres') considered acceptable to Welsh strict metre verse. Gwerful Mechain (fl. 1460–1502) was the earliest Welsh female poet from whom a substantial body of verse has survived; though the role of a professional travelling poet was not open to her she was able to learn the art of poetry from her peers. Her poems include the erotic Cywydd y Cedor ('Poem to the Vagina'), written as a counterpart to Dafydd ap Gwilym's Cywydd y Gâl, as well as a number of works in the Ymryson ('Quarrel' or 'Contenion') tradition, in which two poets would conduct a debate or argument by writing successive poems to one another.

Tudur Aled (c. 1465–1526) was himself a nobleman and one of the greatest of Beirdd yr Uchelwyr, but also one of the last. Born in Llansannan, his most important patrons were the Salisbury family of Dyffryn Clwyd. He was one of the instigators of one of the few Eisteddfodau known to have taken place before the Eighteenth century, at Caerwys in 1523. He was renowned as a praise poet of both secular and religious noblemen, and also reflects the changes at the beginning of the 16th century which were threatening the future of the bardic system. He was extremely highly regarded during his lifetime and the subject of multiple poetic elegies on his death in 1526, an event which is usually taken as the end point of the Beirdd yr Uchelwyr period, and thus of the Medieval period in Welsh literature.

== 16th and 17th centuries ==
The 16th and 17th centuries in Wales, as in the rest of Europe, were a period of great change. Politically, socially, and economically the foundations of modern Wales were laid at this time. In the Laws in Wales Acts 1535-1542 Wales was annexed and integrated fully into the English kingdom, bringing an end to the Welsh legal system and removing the last vestiges of political and administrative independence. The laws were welcomed by the Welsh gentry at the time who viewed them as granting them equality with their English counterparts and the right to elect members of parliament. However, the laws stipulated that knowledge of English was required for any administrative post in Wales and that the courts would henceforth operate in English, and established a Council of Wales and the Marches, based in an English town, Ludlow; although these would not have much impact on the language of the general population (which remained over 80% Welsh-speaking until the 19th century, and over 50% into the 20th) they established English as the language of status and power, beginning a process of anglicisation of the uchelwyr class, which would have been exacerbated by Welshmen who could afford it sending their sons to grammar schools and universities in England, and the intermarriage of Welsh and English families. The anglicisation of the very layer of society which had supported the bardic tradition over the course of the 16th and 17th centuries was exacerbated by the Dissolution of the Monasteries, which took place at exactly the same time as the Acts of Union had been introduced, effectively removing at a stroke another source of patronage and support for Welsh poets. This sense of decline is palpable in the writing of both the poets themselves and those commenting on them during the period.

It has been suggested however that external factors were only one reason for the decline of the bardic tradition, with its inherent conservatism making it appear increasingly irrelevant in a new age of renaissance learning and in the light of contemporary political and religious developments. Audiences, whom would not always have understood refined rarified verse in cynghanedd wrought with archaic words, began to prefer lighter, more comprehensible verse. The decline, however, was slow: although Tudur Aled, who had died in 1526, is considered the last of the Beirdd yr Uchelwyr (see above) and thus the last major poet of the medieval Welsh bardic tradition, poets continued to travel in search of patronage and to sing eulogies in cynghanedd throughout the 16th and 17th centuries. It has been suggested that Owen Gruffydd (1643–1730) may have been the last travelling poet in the traditional Welsh mould; though he was a weaver whose poetry supplemented his income with his poetry rather than a full-time professional poet, the last of whom may have been Siôn Dafydd Las (c.1665–1695). The year 1700 has been described as "a convenient one to mark the end of the bardic tradition"; though poets would still occasionally write praise poetry for uchelwyr "well into the eighteenth century."

Conversely, it is at this time which less rarified poetry in the free metres begins to be recorded in significant volumes. Only occasional fragments like Pais Dinogad (see above) have survived from earlier periods, though it had probably always been popular. This body of verse, which includes folk songs, ballads, love poetry, carols, and popular lyrics shows the influence of contemporary English poetry but also hints at the unrecorded tradition from which it sprung. By the 17th century, most Welsh poets were writing using both strict and free metres, and the uses to which cynghanedd was put had also changed, becoming the preserve of the wider population rather than the jealously guarded tradition of a closed guild of bards. Nevertheless, as a body of verse, the poetry of this period remains less highly regarded than that of the classical tradition of earlier centuries, and even many centuries later much of the work even of significant poets like Huw Morus (1622–1709) remains unpublished.

Beyond poetry, the 16th and 17th century were a crucial period for Welsh literature, with significant developments centered around the work of Renaissance scholars who were active in the promotion of learning, and used the new technology of printing to do so. The most important achievement in this regard was the publication in 1588 of the Welsh Bible.

=== Prose ===
==== The Reformation and Renaissance scholarship ====
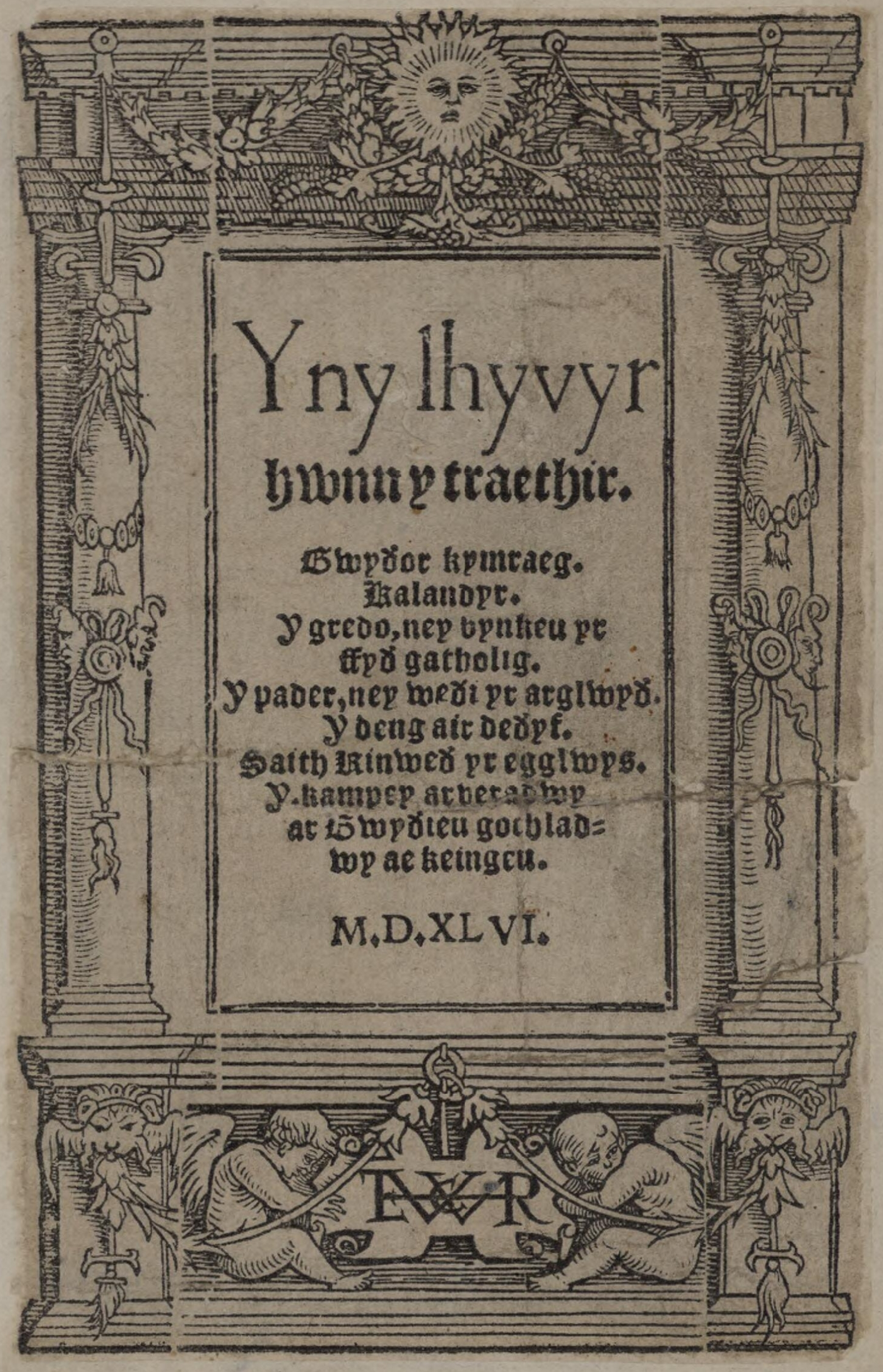
The title page of Yny lhyvyr hwnn, the first printed Welsh book.

The Reformation and the religious tensions of the Tudor period had a transformative impact in Wales. The transition from Roman Catholic worship in Latin to Protestant embrace of vernacular languages represented an opportunity for Welsh: although the language had been explicitly deprived of any formal status by the Acts of Union, a desire for religious conformity led to the approval by Elizabeth I of an Act in 1563 authorising the translation of the Bible and other religious materials into Welsh. A number of Renaissance scholars therefore began to work to provide materials which would enable the services of the new Anglican church to be delivered in Welsh. From the very start these developments in Welsh Protestantism were tied into wider the wider scholarship of a school of 'Welsh Humanists', or a 'Welsh Renaissance'. This was an informal grouping of early scholars whose aim was to ensure that the Welsh could partake in the wider learning of the Renaissance, and do so in their own language. To this end they collected and copied manuscripts, translated religious works and other works, and used the newly invented printing press to disseminate their work.

Among the earliest of these humanist scholars was Sir John Price (c. 1502–55) of Brecon, an aristocrat and an important civil servant. He served as Secretary of the Council of Wales and the Marches and had been one of the officers responsible for administration of the Dissolution of the Monasteries in the area, but he was also a scholar who embraced the latest ideas relating to religion and learning: reform and humanism. His most significant contribution was the publication in 1546 the first book to be printed in Welsh. Known simply as Yny lhyvyr hwnn ("In this book") after the first words on its frontispiece, this was a miscellany of religious material including a Welsh version of the Credo and Lord's Prayer and a primer. He was also a collector of manuscripts on various subjects, including the history and literature of Wales; and as well as its religious material Yn y lhyvyr hwnn had also included a written Welsh alphabet.

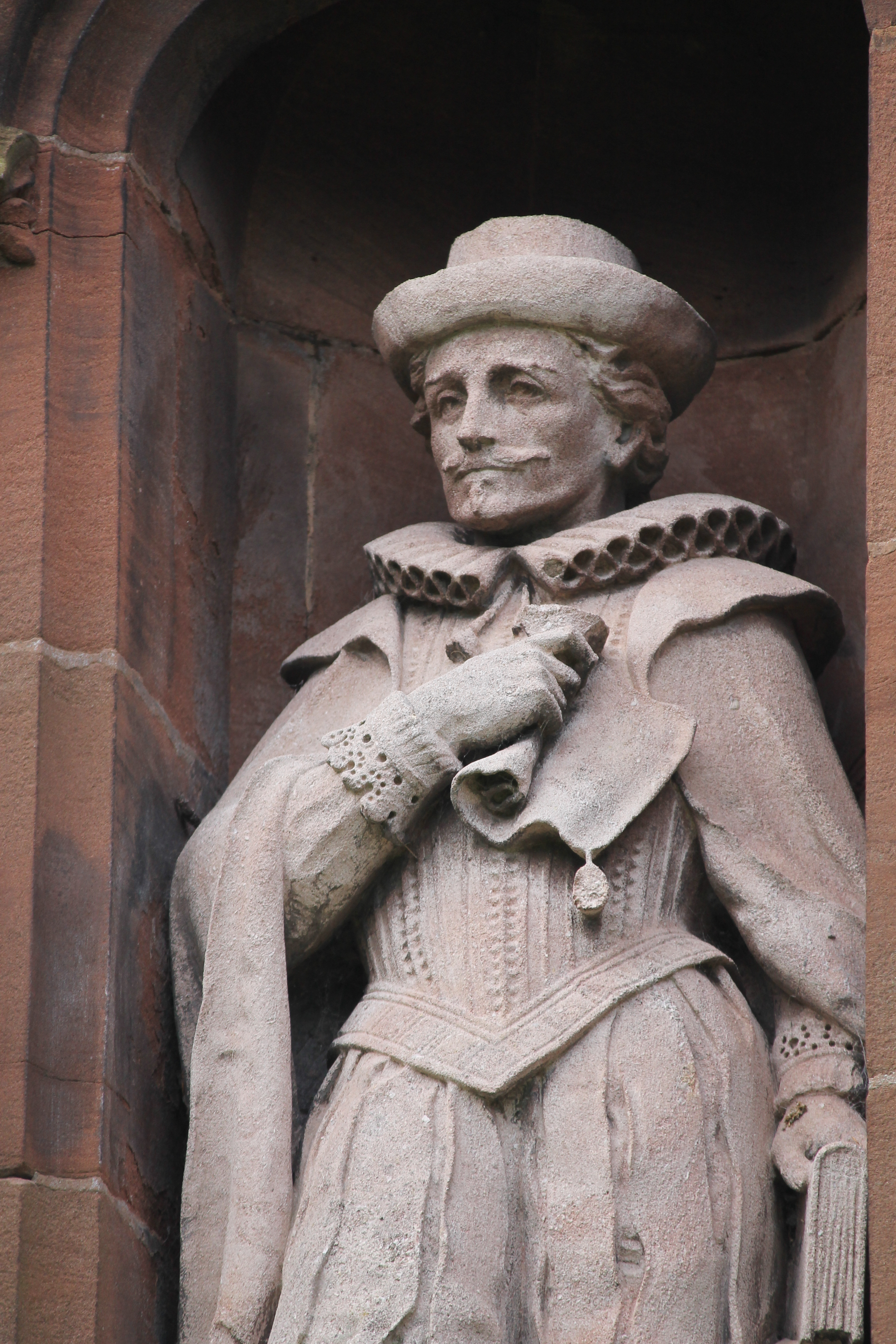
Statue of William Salesbury (c. 1520 – c. 1584) in the churchyard of St Asaph Cathedral.

William Salesbury (c. 1520 – c. 1584) was a contemporary of Price's who also paired ardent Protestantism with a humanist approach to learning; he is perhaps the most significant figure of the Renaissance in Wales. In 1547, the year after Yn y lhyvyr hwnn, he published Oll synnwyr pen Kembero ygyd ('All a Welshman's Wisdom'), a book of proverbs which had been collected by Gruffudd Hiraethog (d.1564), one of the more prominent Welsh poets of the 16th century. More significantly, he produced the first English-Welsh dictionary, and in 1567 translated the New Testament into Welsh. Whilst the renaissance scholars were sometimes seen as being in opposition to the conservatism of the traditional Bardic school, Salesbury and Hiraethog were effusive about one another (with the poet dedicating a praise poem to the scholar). By 1571 Jesus College, Oxford was founded by Welshmen, explicitly in order to provide an academic and religious education for their countrymen; the connection between the college and Wales continues to this day.

==== Recusant Catholic writing ====
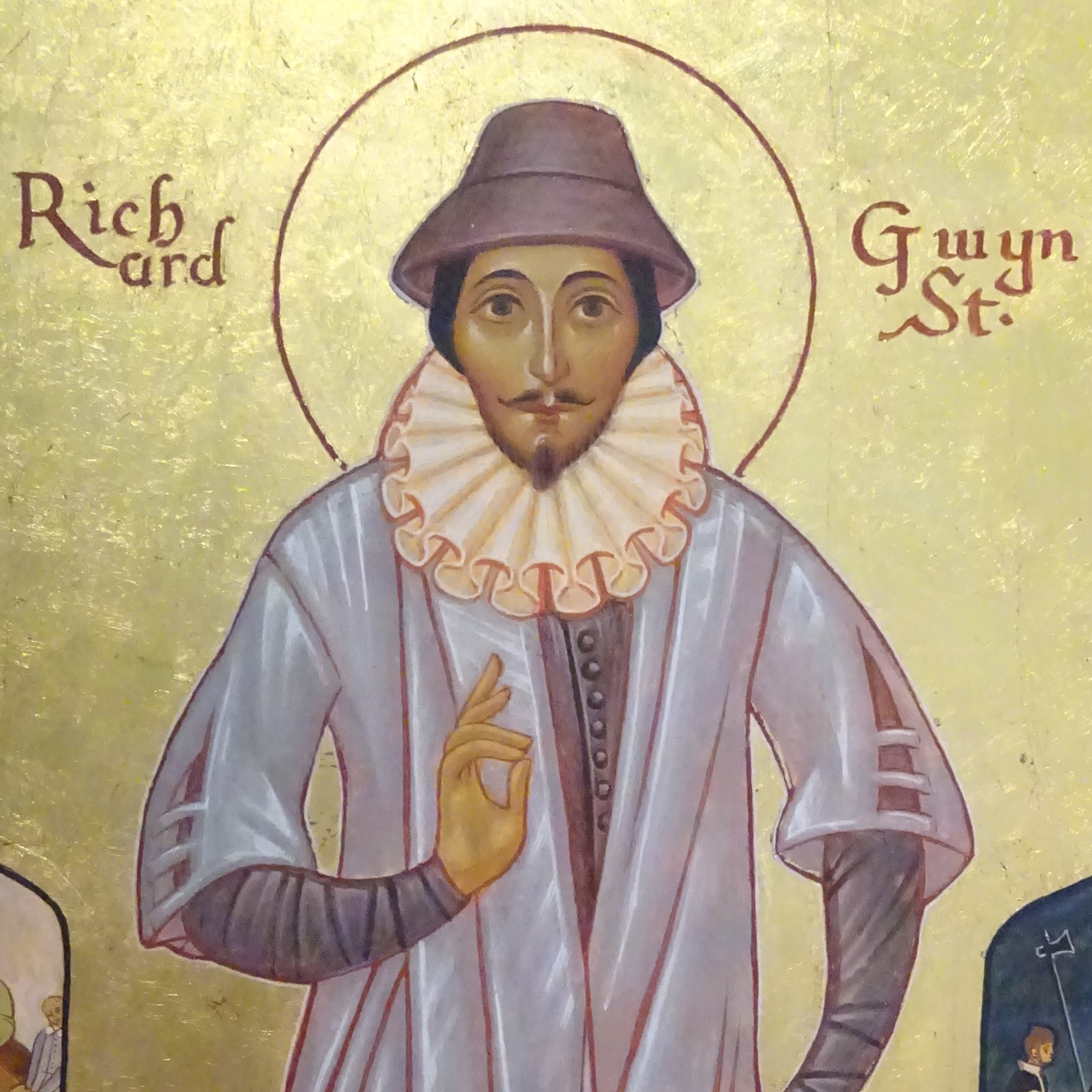
Welsh Poet and Catholic Saint Richard Gwyn (c.1537–1584).

Protestants were not the only participants in the Welsh Renaissance, and a number of Recusant Catholics were active in Welsh literature during the 16th century. Gruffudd Robert (1527–98) was an ardent Catholic who published an important Welsh grammar while in enforced exile in Milan in 1567, where his associate Morys Clynnog (1525–1581) also produced a Welsh Catechism. Other figures included Catrin ferch Gruffudd ap Hywel (fl.1555), a rare (but by no means unique) example of a female poet from the period; Richard Gwyn (c.1537–1584), who is perhaps better known for his dramatic torture and martyrdom and subsequent canonisation than his work as a poet, though the latter drew the attention of prominent 20th-century scholar T. H. Parry-Williams; Robert Gwyn (c.1545– after 1591), whose Y Drych Cristianogawl ('The Christian Mirror') was the first book to be printed in Wales (earlier books like Yn y lhyvyr hwnn had been printed in London due to legal restrictions on printing); and Gwilym Puw (c.1618–c.1689), among others. The number and activity of these poets came despite the fact that recusancy was generally lower in Wales than in much of England; and the flowering of Welsh Catholicism was ultimately short lived. It came to an effective end with the persecution of Catholics in the late 17th century, after which there would be no more notable Catholic figures in Welsh literature until Saunders Lewis in the 20th century.

==== Welsh Bible ====
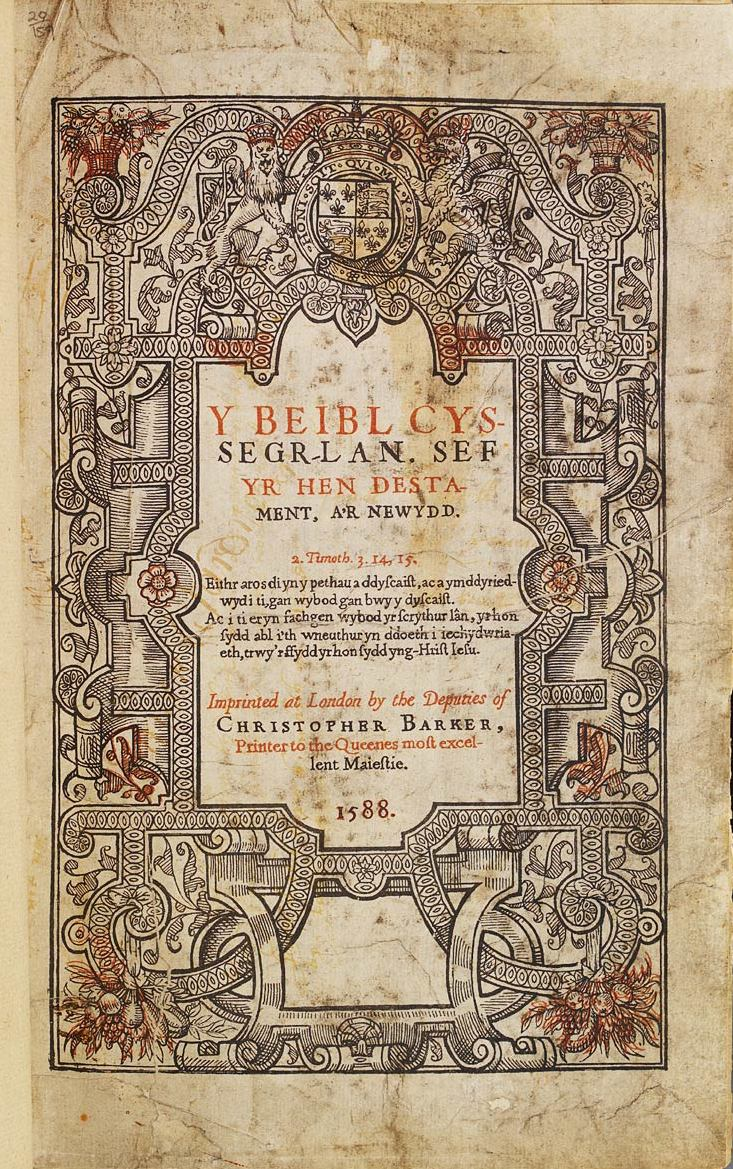
The title page of William Morgan's 1588 Welsh Bible.

The culmination of both the religious and the literary efforts of the Welsh humanist tradition was the publication, in 1588, of a full-scale translation of the Bible by the hand of William Morgan (c.1545–1604), a clergyman who would later become Bishop of Llandaf and St. Asaph. Though various revisions would be made in later periods, Morgan's translation – and especially the 1620 revision by John Davies (c. 1567–1644) – would prove a work of seminal importance not only to Christianity in Wales (as the basis of all Welsh versions of the Bible until the late 20th century), but also to the Welsh language itself. Drawing on the language used in the bardic tradition, Morgan standardised spellings and coined new terms, and such was the work's popularity that its language effectively became the standard form of literary Welsh. Its impact on Welsh orthography was also extremely significant: compared with the Welsh used by William Salesbury in his New Testament of just twenty years earlier it remains easily readable to Welsh speakers today; it has been described as "the real beginnings of the literature [...] of modern Wales."

By 1660 108 Welsh books had been published, an insignificant number compared to English but ten times higher than the equivalent figure for Irish. However, the vast majority of these works were religious in nature, with the few secular works produced in Welsh being mainly linguistic in nature (dictionaries and grammars). Some humanists did attempt to produce a broader range of writing: Elis Gruffydd (1490–1552) was an industrious figure whose enormous Cronicl o Wech Oesoedd ('Chronicle of Six Ages'), an attempt to record a complete history of the world in Welsh, was the first major original historical work written in Welsh (earlier Welsh writers like Nennius and Geoffrey of Monmouth had written in Latin, though translations of their works into Welsh were made). The work's manuscript also incorporates transcriptions of earlier work, such as the earliest known version of Hanes Taliesin, which found its way into the 19th century English translation of the Mabinogion by Charlotte Guest. Both Gruffydd and William Salesbury had written works on medicine. These works all remained unpublished however, and the humanists ambition to publish a wide body of learning in Welsh cannot be said to have been realised on the ambitious terms they had set themselves. Although there were important developments in Welsh scholarship in the later part of the 17th century, later scholars such as Edward Lhuyd (1660–1709) would increasingly view the Welsh language through an antiquarian lens rather than as a medium for scholarship in its own right, publishing their own work in English or Latin. Nevertheless, the Humanists had provided the linguistic foundations for subsequent scholarship in Welsh; a baton that would ultimately be picked up in the 18th century by the scholars of the Welsh societies (see below). Notably, among the secular books that were published was Barddoniaeth neu Brydyddiaeth ('Poetry or Poesy'; 1593) by William Midleton (c.1550–1596), an amateur bardic grammar which would have enabled more widespread access to bardic learning beyond the confines of the licensed poets.

==== 17th century Puritan writing ====
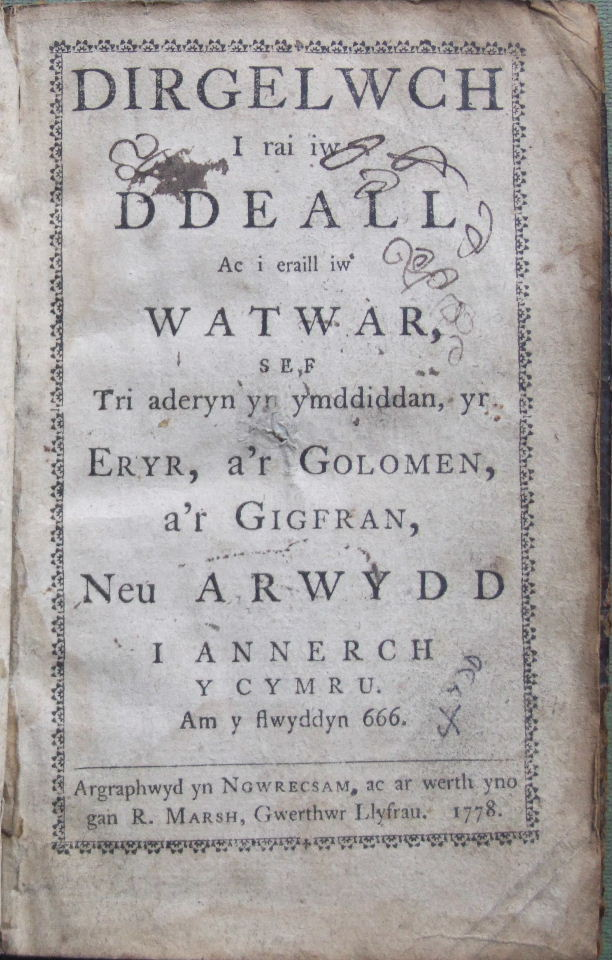
Title page of Morgan Llwyd's Llyfr y Tri Aderyn (1653).

Having being formally incorporated into England in the 16th century, in the middle part of the 17th century Wales was drawn into the English Civil War. Wales itself was considered a conservative Royalist stronghold and the great majority of the population supported the Royalist cause; this is reflected in the fact that the "great bulk of the surviving texts" in Welsh from the period were written by Royalists. Nevertheless, perhaps the single most prominent and gifted literary figure of the 17th century was a Puritan and a Parliamentarian. Morgan Llwyd (1619–1659), perhaps the most prominent literary figure of the 17th century in Welsh. A Fifth Monarchist who used both prose and poetry in both English and Welsh to recount his spiritual experiences and spread his faith, he had served as a chaplain in the Parliamentarian Army and was a prolific publisher, producing ten books in the space of five years, all of which are religious in nature and many of which include elements of mysticism. Llwyd's best known work is the prose Llyfr y Tri Aderyn ('The Book of the Three Birds'; 1653), an allegory in the form of a dialogue between a Raven, an Eagle and a Dove who represent respectively Anglicanism, the secular Government and Puritanism over the course of which the Eagle becomes convinced of the validity of the Dove's views and the imminent Last Judgement. Whilst Llwyd's work has an explicit agenda which is difficult to divorce from its original context, he was a major prose stylist who used Welsh "in new ways, crafting sentences which are rhythmically enticing and which present extremely complex ideas in beautiful prose." Disregarding the anonymous author(s) of the Mabinogion Morgan Llwyd is the first major writer in the Welsh nonconformist tradition as well as being the earliest major figure in Welsh literature whose main contribution was in prose rather than poetry; his writing influenced writers as late as the 20th century such as John Gwilym Jones (see below). His prose is also notable for the way it discusses the Welsh as a distinct nation and people (using the term 'Cymry'); he would be described as a "Nation Builder" by Gwynfor Evans.

Although Llwyd's works were by far the best known and most influential of the products of Welsh Puritanism in the 17th century, a few other Puritan works were produced in Welsh, perhaps the most important of which was a translation John Bunyan's The Pilgrim's Progress by Stephen Hughes (1622 -1688) which appeared in 1688 under the title Taith y Pererin and proved a major influence on the literature of the Welsh Methodist Revival of the 18th century (see below). Other Puritans who used Welsh included Vavasor Powell (1617–1670).

=== Poetry 1530–1700 ===
==== Strict metres ====
Although, as noted above, the 16th century after 1530 is considered a period when the Welsh bardic tradition was in decline, it was a gradual one and aspects of the tradition continued in various ways until the turn of the 18th century. Two documented events referred to as Eisteddfodau were held at the home of the Mostyn family of uchelwyr in Caerwys in 1523 and 1568, though these appear to have been administrative meetings to formalise and protect the tradition rather than competitions or cultural events in the modern sense of the term. A number of individual poets continued to produce work of quality in the strict metres and in his analysis of the bardic tradition during the period Ceri Lewis names Siôn Tudur (c.1522–1602) Simwnt Fychan (c.1530–1606) – who was named 'pencerdd' at the 1568 Caerwys Esiteddfod – and William Llŷn (c.1535–1580) as poets who "succeeded in rising above the general level of artistic mediocrity". Of these, William Llŷn is particularly highly regarded. Although he was a conservative poet whose style and manner largely reflects the poets of the uchelwyr period, he has been called "the supreme elegist in the whole history of Welsh poetry" and one of the finest poets of his age. A re-evaluation of the role of women in Welsh poetry during the twenty-first century has led to the rediscovery of Alis Wen (c.1520–?), whose work includes a series of englynion in which she compares the kind of husband her father wishes for her with her own desires. Though only a few surviving poems can be attributed to her, her work has described as "one of the most arresting, original and personable voices" in 16th century Welsh poetry.

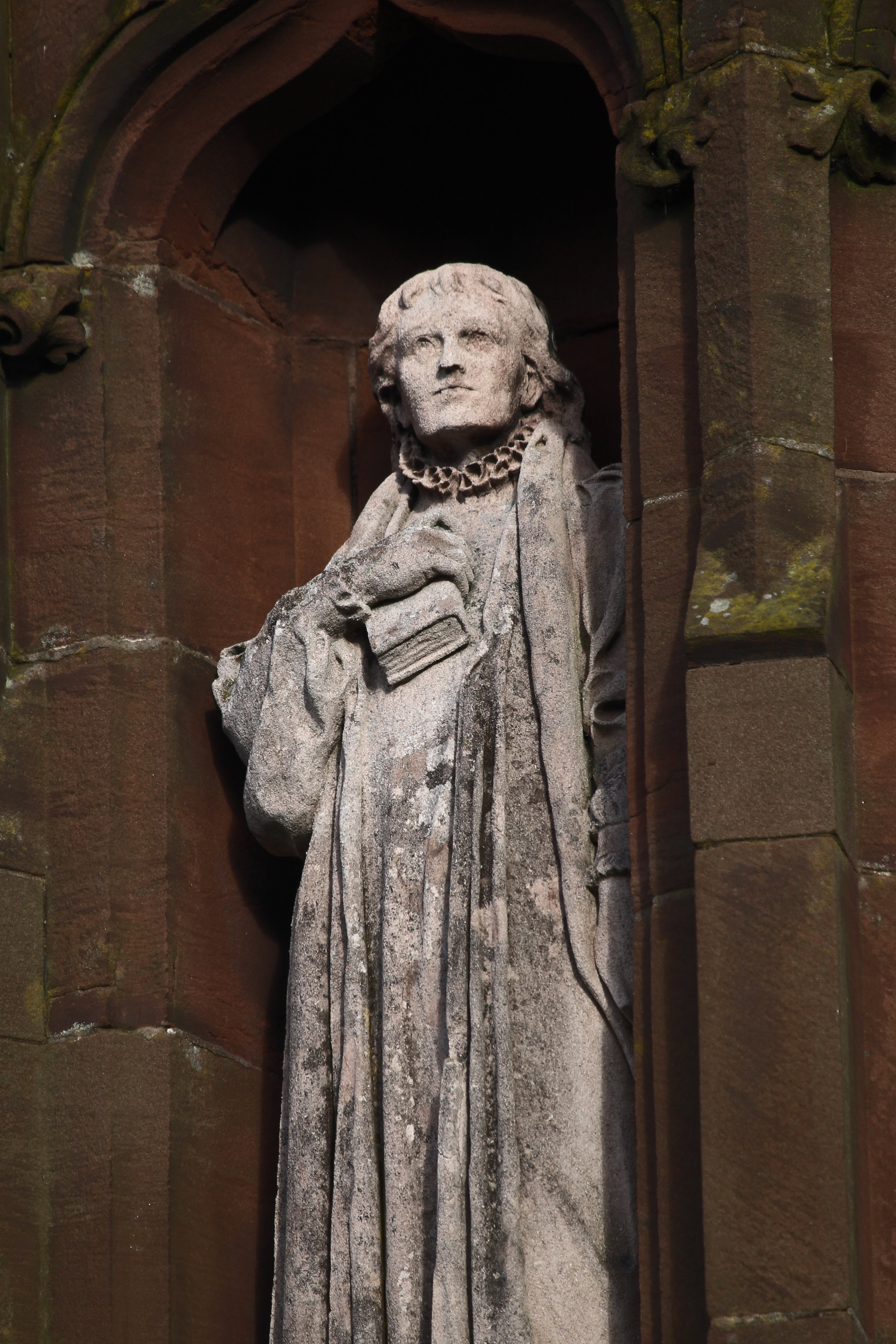
Edmwnd Prys (c.1542–1623) as depicted at St. Asaph Cathedral.

Although some professional poets such as Gruffudd Hiraethog (?–1564), who had collaborated with William Salesbury on Oll Synnwyr Pen Cymro (see above), embraced the developments of the Renaissance, others saw it as a threat. Nowhere is this hostility more clearly displayed than in the enormous ymryson or exchange of verses between William Cynwal (?–c.1587) and Edmwnd Prys (c.1542–1623), one of the scholars of the Welsh Renaissance (see above). Over this remarkable exchange of poems, fifty-four in total and mainly in the cywydd form, which came to an end only with Cynwal's death in 1587, the two poets discuss the nature of knowledge and poetry, with Cynwal defending what he saw as the traditional art of the Welsh bard. Edmwnd Prys also became known for a translation of the Psalms.

==== Free metres ====
The overwhelming majority of the Welsh poetry recorded after the ossification of the rules of cynghanedd during the Poetry of the Princes period (see above) up until the middle of the 16th century had been in the strict metres. This began to change after 1530 however and the manuscripts from this period contain a very large body of verse not in cynghanedd, much of which is anonymous and most of which had remained unpublished even by the 21st century. The professional poets held a dim view of such efforts; but it has been suggested that the ease with which Welsh poets took to the free metres strongly suggests that such works had always been employed in Welsh and simply considered unworthy of preservation in manuscript. Cennard Davies identifies two distinctive strands in the free metre poetry of the 16th century: the first, represented by figures such as Robin Clidro (fl.1545–80), drawing mainly on this now-lost folk tradition; and the second, as exemplified by the work of Richard Hughes (c.1565–1618), who had been a member of the Royal Court, showing the influence of Elizabethan poetry, particularly love poetry.

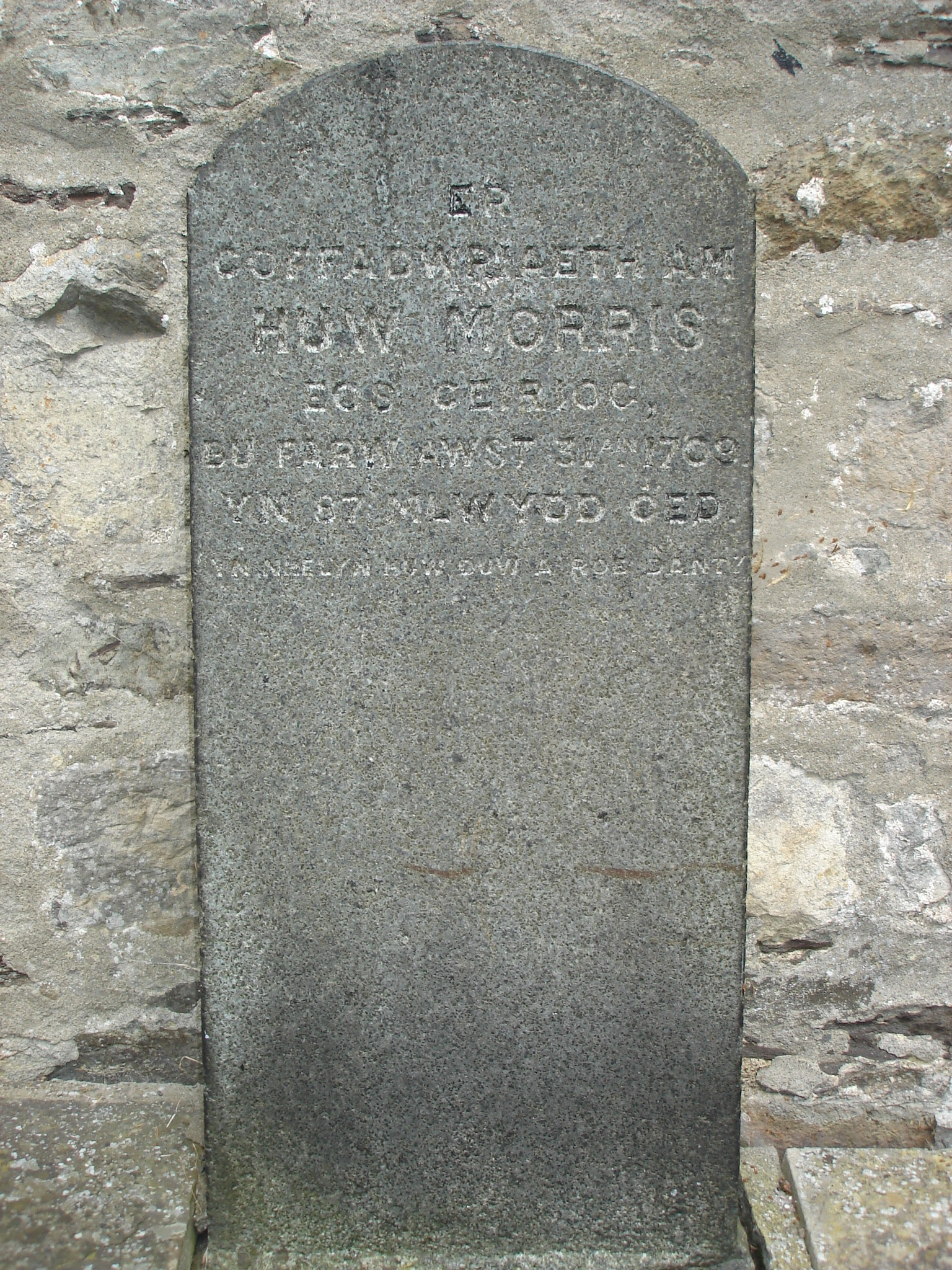
The grave of Huw Morys (or Morris, 1622–1709), poet and Anterliwtiwr.

Significantly, though his work in the free metres is of more lasting importance, Hughes had also written in the strict metres, and by the 17th century most Welsh poets were writing both with and without cynghanedd; as would be the case for most Welsh poets afterwards barring occasional exceptions like Goronwy Owen (see below). The work of Huw Morys of Llansilin (1622–1709; his name is sometimes spelled Morus or Morris and he was also known as 'Eos Ceiriog') exemplifies this change in several respects: he was the most highly regarded Welsh poet of his age during his own lifetime, even though he wrote mainly in the free metres; he is perhaps the earliest figure of which this could be said. Furthermore, Morys often employed the free metres to eulogise his patrons, something which would have been considered unacceptable or even insulting by the earlier poets. Alongside praise poems and eulogies he produced a large number of love poems and political poems in support of the Royalist cause. Known especially for his songs, he was an innovative poet who experimented by threading poems in the free metres with cynghanedd; he also wrote Anterliwtiau (see below). A popular poet long after his death, he was a direct influence on much later figures in the lyrical tradition such as Talhaiarn.

After Morys, perhaps the most notable of 17th century Welsh poets was his contemporary Edward Morris (1607–1689), whose work similarly blends cynghanedd and the free metres, though he made wider use of the former than Morys. Among the other poets of note during the 17th century, Nesta Lloyd mentions William Salesbury (1580–1660; not to be confused with the 16th century humanist of the same name, see above), who had been a general in the civil war; Rowland Fychan (c.1590–1667), author of a highly distinctive poem requesting a Cat to send an important military message; and William Phylip (c.1590-1670); as well as the Puritan Morgan Llwyd (see above). Few of these poets were extensively published during their own lifetimes, or since; despite publishing ten works of prose for example Llwyd published only a single poem. This could not be said of another Welsh poet, clergyman Rhys Prichard (1579–1644), known as 'Y Ficer Prichard' ('Prichard the Vicar'), who by contrast was the most published Welsh poet before the 19th century. His poetry, which consists mainly of simple instructional religious verses in rhyme, proved enormously popular throughout the next three centuries, in part because (though Prichard was an Anglican) it anticipate the instructional poetry of the Methodist Revival (see below).

==== The Anterliwt ====
Although performance had always been a strong element in the Welsh poetic tradition, it was this period which saw the earliest evidence for the performance of drama in Welsh, in the form of the Anterliwt. Although no individual performance of an Anterliwt can definitively be dated earlier than 1654, the appearance of the word in William Salesbury's 1547 dictionary (see above) suggests the form was in existence over a century earlier. Associated primarily with North-East Wales, Anterliwtiau were folk stage works in verse probably related to the English Morality Play (the name anterliwt is derived from the English "interlude", referring to the lighter passages in a Morality play), though showing a greater emphasis on secular elements as well as on bawdiness, innuendo, slapstick and satire. They would be performed at fairs and other public occasions, such as a Gŵyl Mabsant. The earliest surviving Anterliwt is entitled Y Rhyfel Cartrefol ('The Civil War') and appears to have been written in 1660 to commemorate the Restoration; it satirises the Commonwealth of England and is likely the work of Huw Morys (see above). Anterliwtiau relied heavily on stock characters such as the Fool and the Miser, whose lighthearted slapstick antics were juxtaposed with a more serious story with a historical, biblical or mythological basis. Due to their bawdy elements performances of Anterliwtiau were condemned by the more socially conservative elements of Welsh society, and performances were banned during the Commonwealth; and the aforementioned earliest evidence for a performance in 1654 is in fact a legal record of a court case in which a nobleman was accused of having one illegally performed in private. While the Anterliwt was clearly a common fixture in Welsh life during the 17th century, comparatively few examples of the genre survive from this early, and it was not until the eighteenth century that the form would reach its apogee.

== 18th century ==
By the turn of the 18th century, the Welsh tradition of travelling poets and noble patronage that had sustained Welsh poets since the age of the Poets of the Princes had all but died out. Over the course of the new century however, two significant new cultural movements would emerge, building on the work of the renaissance and religious scholars of the previous centuries, to ultimately provide new support networks for Welsh culture and reinvigorate Welsh-language literature in different ways throughout the second half of the 18th and through the 19th century. These were firstly the Welsh societies, such as the Cymmrodorion and the Gwyneddigion; and secondly the Welsh Methodist Revival. A parallel development connected with the second of these was the 'circulating schools' of Griffith Jones (1684–1761), which, it is believed, taught over 200,000 Welsh people to read (in Welsh) during the 18th century, making the country one of the most literate in Europe despite its comparative poverty. This new period of mass literacy would lead to a significant increase in the quantity and availability of printed material in Welsh, coming to full fruition with the remarkable vitality of the Welsh press during the 19th century (see below).

The Welsh societies – initially in London but with branches later established in Wales itself – were bourgeois amateur scholarly societies which revolved around prominent individuals such as brothers Lewis (1701–1767) and Richard Morris (1703–1779) and later Iolo Morgannwg (1747–1826). These societies functioned to rediscover, maintain and reinvigorate practices and traditions, particularly formal poetical traditions. This activity, related to the Celtic revival, included the publication of the poetry of previous eras, a neoclassical revival in strict metre poetry of which the central figure was Goronwy Owen (1723–1769) and, by the end of the 18th century, the establishment of the Eisteddfod in something approximating its modern form. The Welsh societies were also a means through which the ideas of the Age of Enlightenment could impact on, and find expression in, Welsh literature.

The second trend, roughly contemporaneous but entirely independent of the societies, was the Welsh Methodist revival and the gradual emergence of Nonconformism as the dominant religious force in Wales. Diverging from English Wesleyan Methodism comparatively early in its development, the Welsh Calvinistic Methodist Church, initially led by preachers such as Howell Harris and Daniel Rowland, would later come to be the largest of the nonconformist denominations in Wales, and both nonconformism generally and Methodism specifically would come to increasingly dominate Welsh cultural life, including its literature. The movement produced its most influential literary figure right at its inception, in William Williams Pantycelyn (1717–1791).

=== Early 18th-century prose works ===
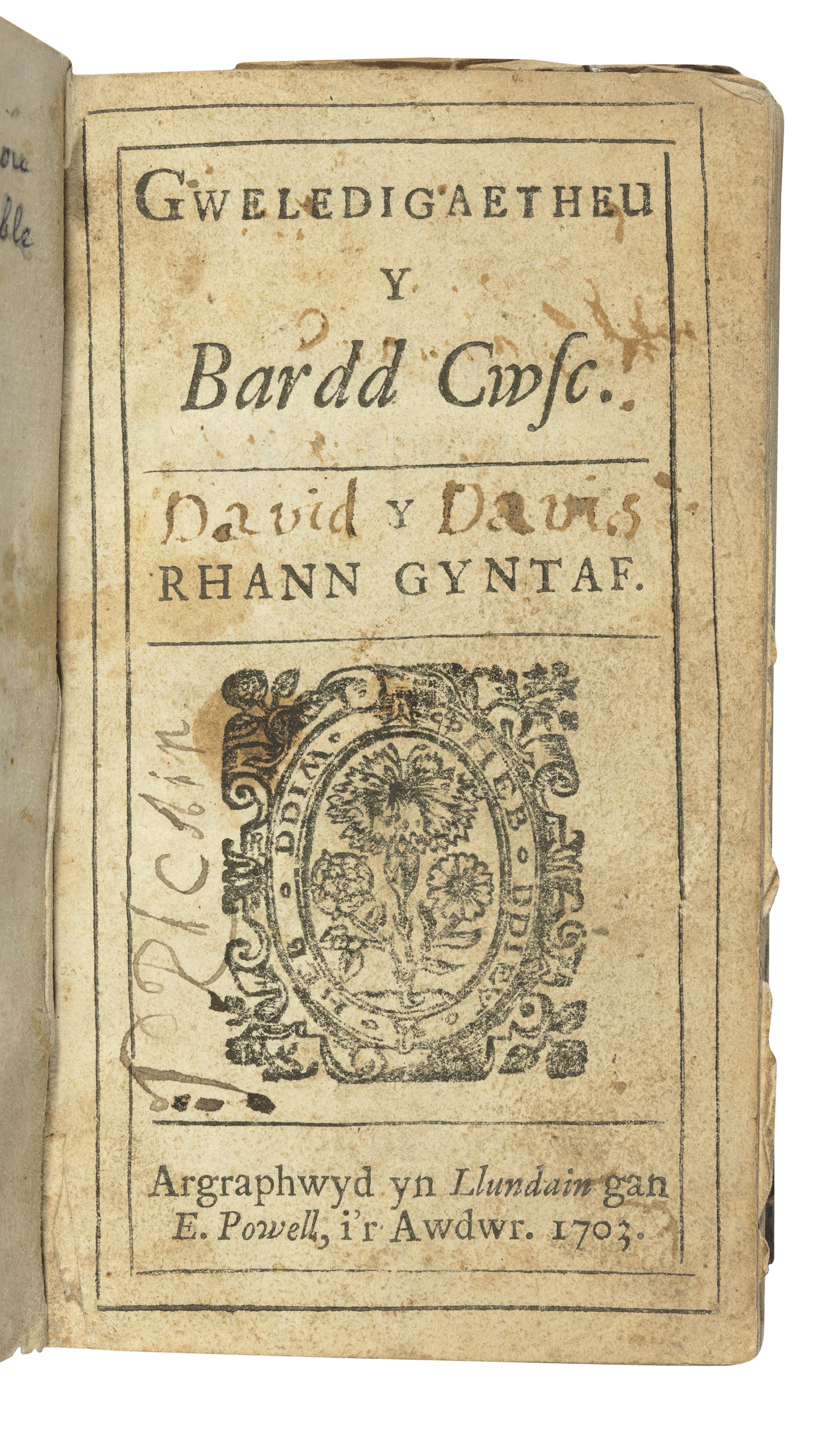
Gweledigaetheu y Bardd Cwsc by Ellis Wynne

While prose remained a comparatively small part of the total output of Welsh-language literature in the eighteenth century, the century saw the publication of a number of canonical prose works which would have a lasting influence on the Welsh literary tradition. The first of these, Gweledigaetheu y Bardd Cwsc ('Visions of the Sleeping Bard') by Ellis Wynne (1671–1734), dates to the opening years of the century, having first been published in London in 1703. Though a partial adaptation of Sir Roger L'Estrange's translation of the Spanish satirist Francisco de Quevedo's Los Sueños ('The Visions'; 1627), it is not a direct translation and Wynne thoroughly reworked the source material, creating a work "thoroughly Welsh in nature as well as language". A clergyman and Oxford graduate, Wynne's work is a religious allegory depicting a series of dreams or visions consisting of savage pictures of contemporary evils as well as of Hell. At least 32 editions had appeared up to 1932, and at least three translations into English were made. The title page bears the words Y Rhann Gyntaf ('The First Part') and it has been suggested that Wynne wrote a second part, but if it was ever completed it has not survived. Wynne's reputation rests entirely on Gweledigaetheu y Bardd Cwsc, yet he has been described as "the most famous Welsh prose writer of the period between the Middle Ages and Daniel Owen".

Another clergyman, Theophilus Evans (1693–1767), was the author of Drych y Prif Oesoedd ('A Mirror to the Main Ages'; originally published in 1716 but heavily expanded and revised in 1740). This important prose work purported to be a history of the Welsh people, though as it draws heavily on sources such as Geoffrey of Monmouth it is a work of historiography or historical fiction that falls well short of modern standards of scholarship; nevertheless as a source in its own right it provides a fascinating window into Welsh self-conception in the 18th century. The book portrays historical events in a narrative style, often featuring imagined dialogue between historical characters, and many individual passages anticipate the later development of the Welsh-language novel. It would go through several editions over the 18th and 19th centuries, playing a significant part in the preservation of myths and traditions relating to Welsh identity.

=== Literature of the Methodist revival ===
Both Ellis Wynne and Theophilus Evans had been clergy in the established Church of England, and while the majority of the population were members of the established church the religious character of Wales would change markedly over the next century and a half as a result of the Welsh Methodist revival. The relationship between the Methodists and the Welsh language was in part a question of practicality – Welsh was the only language of the majority of the population in the eighteenth century, a fact any mass religious movement would have needed to reflect – but also reflected its native origins and genuine grassroots support. The Methodists' theological emphasis on a personal relationship with God strongly encouraged literacy so that congregations could read the Bible for themselves, and built on the work of Griffith Jones, who had established his 'circulating schools' for a similar reason, with a transformative impact on literacy. Whilst Jones's schools had employed only the Bible and Book of Common Prayer, the spread of Methodism drove a demand for new texts, both literary and practical.

There were examples of influential Methodist writers, such as Thomas Jones (1756–1820), who employed a range of literary genres, including (in Jones's case) strict-metre poetry. But the genre most closely associated with the Methodist Revival was the hymn (Welsh: emyn). As well as being both theologically acceptable and a useful didactic tool to spread the faith, the singing of hymns was a popular means for mass participation, even among the illiterate and uneducated. Whilst hymns had been sung in Wales long before the Methodist Revival, Methodists like William Williams Pantycelyn (1717–1791), Dafydd Jones (1717–1777), Dafydd William (c. 1720–1794) and, by the end of the century, Ann Griffiths (1776–1805) truly popularised the genre, which in the nineteenth century saw significant contributions from members of other denominations as well (see below). Many of the Welsh hymns written in this period remain widely sung in congregations today.

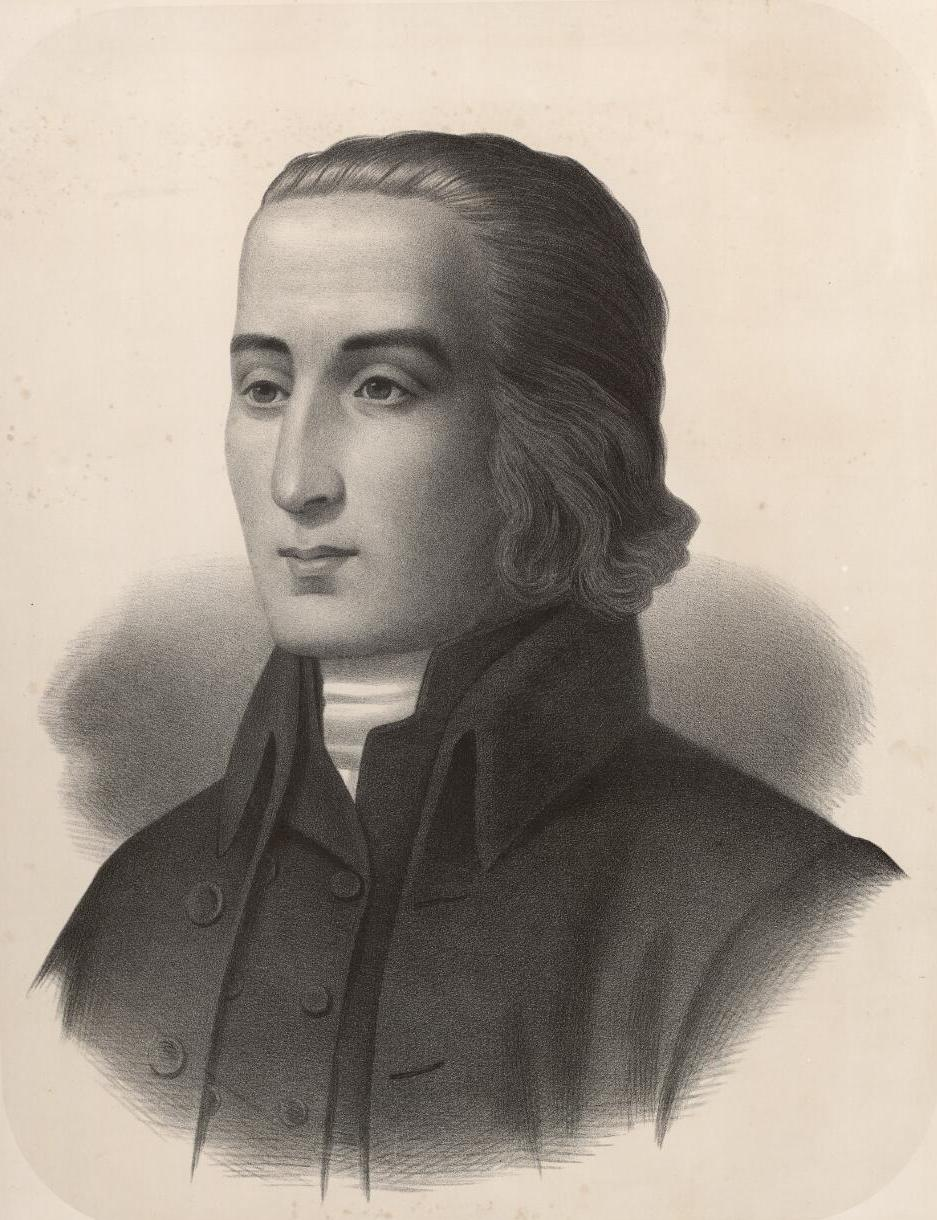
William Williams Pantycelyn (1717–1791), the central figure of the Methodist revival in Welsh literature

Undoubtedly the most important writer of the revival was William Williams Pantycelyn, who would become one of the most influential Welsh literary figures of the eighteenth and indeed of any century. Williams had joined the Methodist movement during its early years while training to be a curate (when it was still a movement within the established church) and became one of the leaders of the movement in Wales himself. He was copiously prolific in various literary fields, producing two epic poems – Golwg ar Deyrnas Crist ('A Look at Christ's Kingdom'; 1756) and Bywyd a Marwolaeth Theomemphus ('The Life and Death of Theomemphus'; 1764) – and a large number of poetic elegies and prose works, but he is particularly noted as Wales's chief writer of hymns, a tradition of which he can justifiably be considered the founding figure. He remains a major figure in the Welsh literary canon even to figures unsympathetic to his religious perspective, such as Saunders Lewis.

Pantycelyn's work exemplified the revival itself in two key respects: the first is that effectively all of it is religious, serving first and foremost to celebrate Christianity and promote Methodism alongside, its literary function and value being an instrumental goal to this end. Secondly, it owed little to nothing to the pre-existing literary tradition in Welsh. Indeed, some have suggested that the Methodists were indifferent or even actively hostile to some older forms of literature and culture, which became marginalised or died out altogether. These included not only secular folk culture and the anterliwt, which were perceived as corrupting influences, but also much of the native religious culture associated with the Established Church, such as the plygain and carol singing.

The Methodists were also active in prose-writing with Pantycelyn once more to the fore, producing a number of prose works in the later part of his career. As with all Pantycelyn's work his prose is religiously themed, and while many of these works can be characterised more as didactic tracts or practical advice for living a Christian life rather than genuine literary works, others, such as Tri Wŷr o Sodom a'r Aifft ('Three Men of Sodom and Egypt'; 1768) are religious allegories, using fiction to explore Christian morality. Though they have this in common with Gweledigaetheu y Bardd Cwsc, as with Pantycelyn's poetry he did not draw on the existing Welsh tradition and a more likely influence is John Bunyan's The Pilgrim's Progress, which had appeared in Welsh translation as early as 1688 under the title Taith y Pererin and was one of the most popular and influential books of the period in Welsh.

=== Welsh societies and their circles ===
==== The Cymmrodorion ====
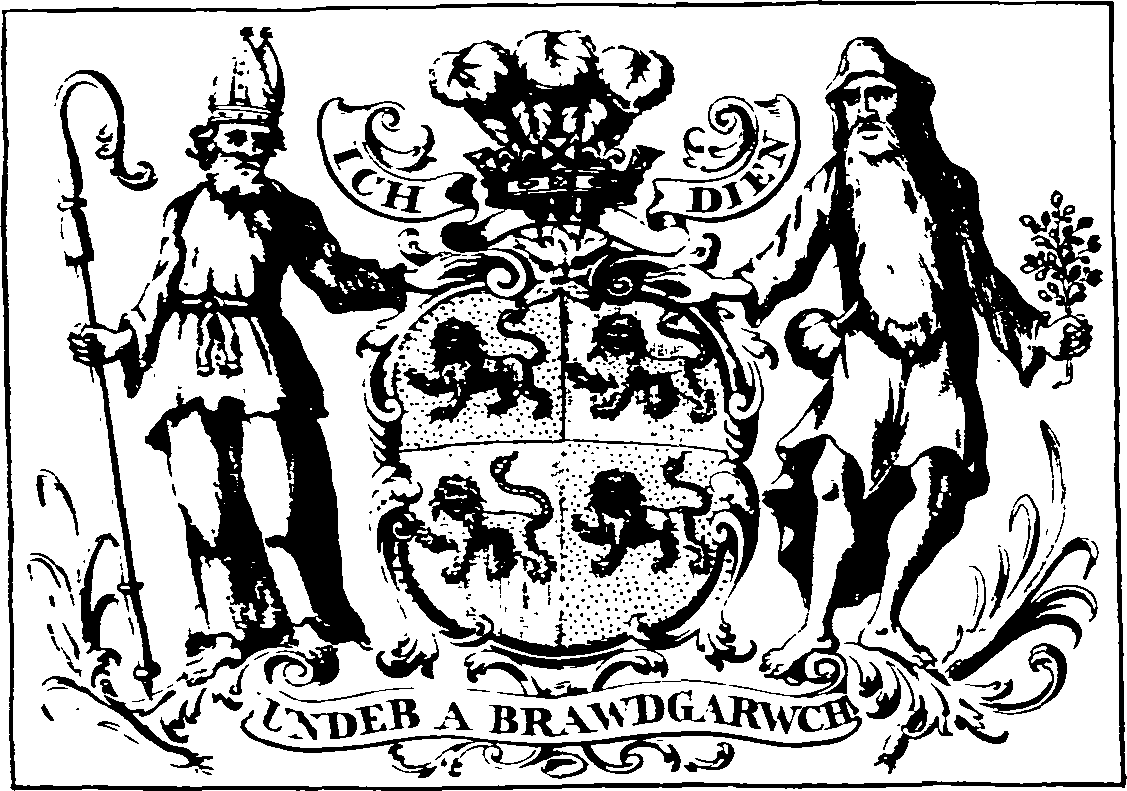
Device of the Cymmrodorion, featuring the arms of the native Princes of Wales.

Ever since the Glyndŵr rebellion and particularly from the Tudor period onwards, London had been a focal point for the Welsh diaspora, and by the eighteenth century this was manifested in the establishment of London-based societies which served a social function but were also a means to promote Welsh culture and literature. Modelled somewhat on the learned societies which existed in other fields, these groups promoted learning and the study of the tradition. One such society had been established as early as 1715 in the form of the Honourable and Loyal Society of Antient Britons (est. 1715), but more important was the Cymmrodorion founded in 1751 by the Anglesey brothers Lewis (1701–1767), Richard (1703–1779) and William Morris (1705–1763). As a group, the Morrises main legacy was as antiquarians, scholars, manuscript collectors and as enablers and champions of other poets, and by the middle of the century Lewis Morris was recognised as the highest authority in the world on the Welsh language. He has been described as the central figure of 18th century Welsh literature.

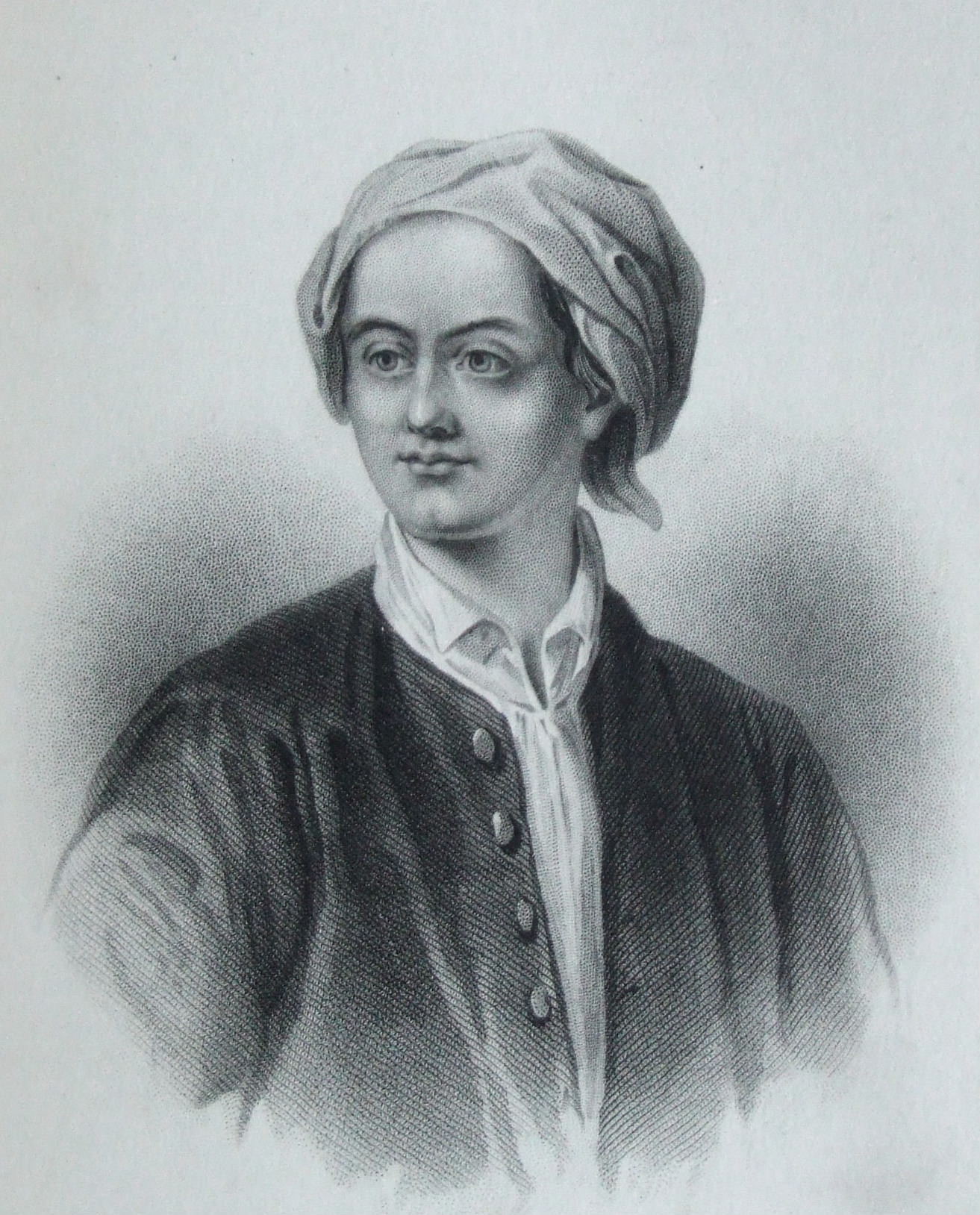
Lewis Morris (1701–1765), poet and founder of the Cymmrodorion.

The Cymmrodorion championed poetry, especially strict-metre poetry in cynghanedd, and as a result of their efforts the 18th century saw something of a revival of the art following relatively fallow periods over the previous two centuries. That the Cymmrodorion poets believed there had been a in Welsh poetry since the uchelwyr period and were seeking to reverse it is apparent from their writing. This revival has been described as the first a number of periods in Welsh literature in which a perception of decline was addressed by drawing on the past as a source of renewal and reinvigoration. Lewis Morris (1701–1765) himself was one of the major voices of this revival, and his poems, whose subjects include snails and petticoats, are notable for a playfulness not seen in the strict metres since the days of Dafydd ap Gwilym (see above) that often sits in contrast with the seriousness of his contemporaries.

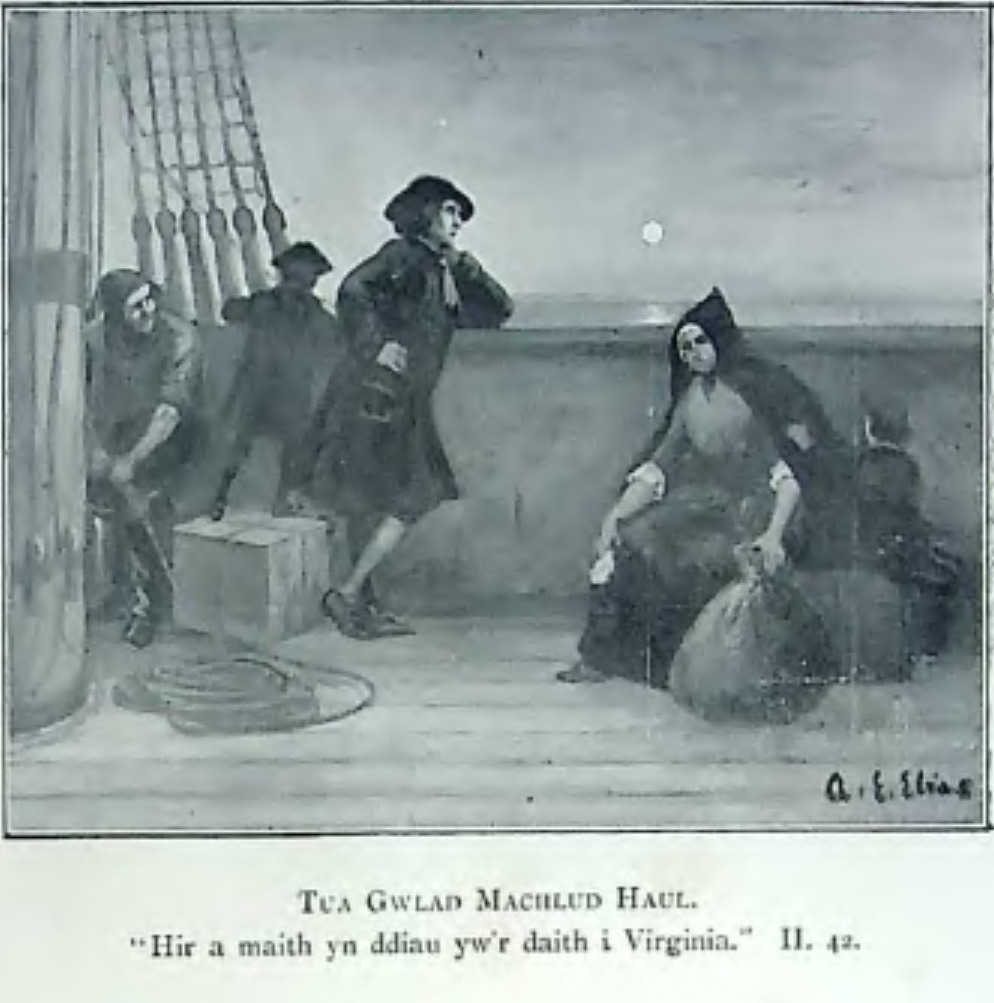
1901 depiction of Goronwy Owen (1723–1769) departing for Virginia.

This seriousness is perhaps nowhere more apparent than in the work of the figure of curate Goronwy Owen (1723–1769), who of the names associated with the Cymmrodorion was perhaps the greatest and undoubtedly the most influential poet in his own right. Much of his poetry discusses religious themes but also discusses hiraeth for his home and poems to his friends and associates. Perhaps more than any of the figures of this period he was a classicist, consciously reaching back to the old bardic tradition and writing almost all his poetry in cynghanedd with a distinctly Augustan flavour. In 1760, however, having fallen out with Lewis Morris, Owen would emigrate to the United States where he lived out the last part of his life, never returning to Wales. He would write just one poem after leaving Britain. Owen's great ambition as a poet was to produce an epic poem in Welsh equivalent to Milton's Paradise Lost. Although he discussed this idea at length he never made an attempt to realise it himself (coming perhaps closest in Cywydd y Farn Fawr ('The Judgement Day Cywydd'), which captures something of the same grandeur on a much smaller scale); but fulfilling this ambition would become a major preoccupation for the Welsh poets of the 19th century, for whom Owen would acquire a reputation unmatched by any other poet. Though his poetry would not have been known during his own lifetime outside the circles of the Cymmrodorion he was the single largest influence on the Eisteddfod poets of the later 18th and 19th centuries.

Many of the major poets of the middle part of the 18th century were part of the circle of the Cymmrodorion. Most of these, like Huw Huws (1693–1776) and Robin Ddu o Fôn (1744–1785) – who would go on to be a founder of the Gwyneddigion society (see below) – focused on the strict metres; but others like Huw Jones o Langwm (c. 1700–1782) were poets in the popular free metre styles like the ballad, and of anterliwtiau (see below). Others made their mark in other fields: Ieuan Fardd (1731–1788) was, like Goronwy Owen, a cleric and an influential strict-metre poet, but was also the circle's greatest scholar. Published perhaps to capitalise on the popularity of the Ossian forgeries around the same, his influential Some Specimens of the Poetry of the Antient Welsh Bards (1764) contained the first ever publication of Aneirin's Y Gododdin (see above) which had to all intents and purposes lain unknown for centuries prior to its rediscovery by Ieuan Fardd. Although alcoholism and poverty severely curtailed his productivity, Ieuan Fardd was a scholar who produced "brilliant work" of "unquestioned importance" and his scholarly work is largely free of the creative interpretation (or outright fabrication) which characterises the scholarship of later figures like William Owen Pughe and Iolo Morgannwg (see below).

==== The Gwyneddigion ====
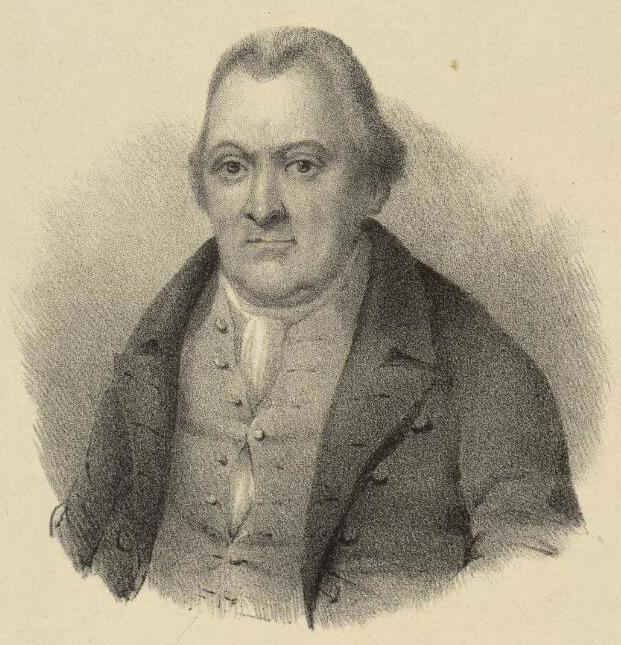
Owain Myfyr (1741–1814), first president of the Gwyneddigion

While the Cymmrodorion would continue for some time after the deaths of Lewis Morris in 1765, it was perceived as elitist by some, who resented its narrow conception of literature and its focus on cynghanedd. This contributed to the establishment of the Gwyneddigion in 1770, with the two societies running in parallel for a period. The death of Richard Morris in 1779 was another blow to the Cymmrodorion, and by 1787 the society had effectively ceased, its presidential chair symbolically transferred to the Gwyneddigion in recognition that it was now the premier Welsh society; though the Cymmrodorion would be resurrected in 1820. Although the name 'Gwyneddigion' (meaning 'Gwynedd scholars') implies a particular link with Gwynedd, its affiliations were from the start with the whole of North Wales, and later with all parts of Wales. Foremost among the founders was the antiquarian Owain Myfyr (1741–1814), who became the society's first president. Myfyr, a successful businessman, was the group's enabler, sponsoring much of their activities at considerable personal expense. Other notable members included many of the key literary figures of the late 18th and early 19th centuries: the antiquarian and lexicographer William Owen Pughe (1759–1835) and the poets Twm o'r Nant (1739–1810), Siôn Ceiriog (1747–1792), Iolo Morganwg (1747–1826), Edward Jones ("Bardd y Brenin"; 1752–1824), and Jac Glan-y-gors (1766–1821).

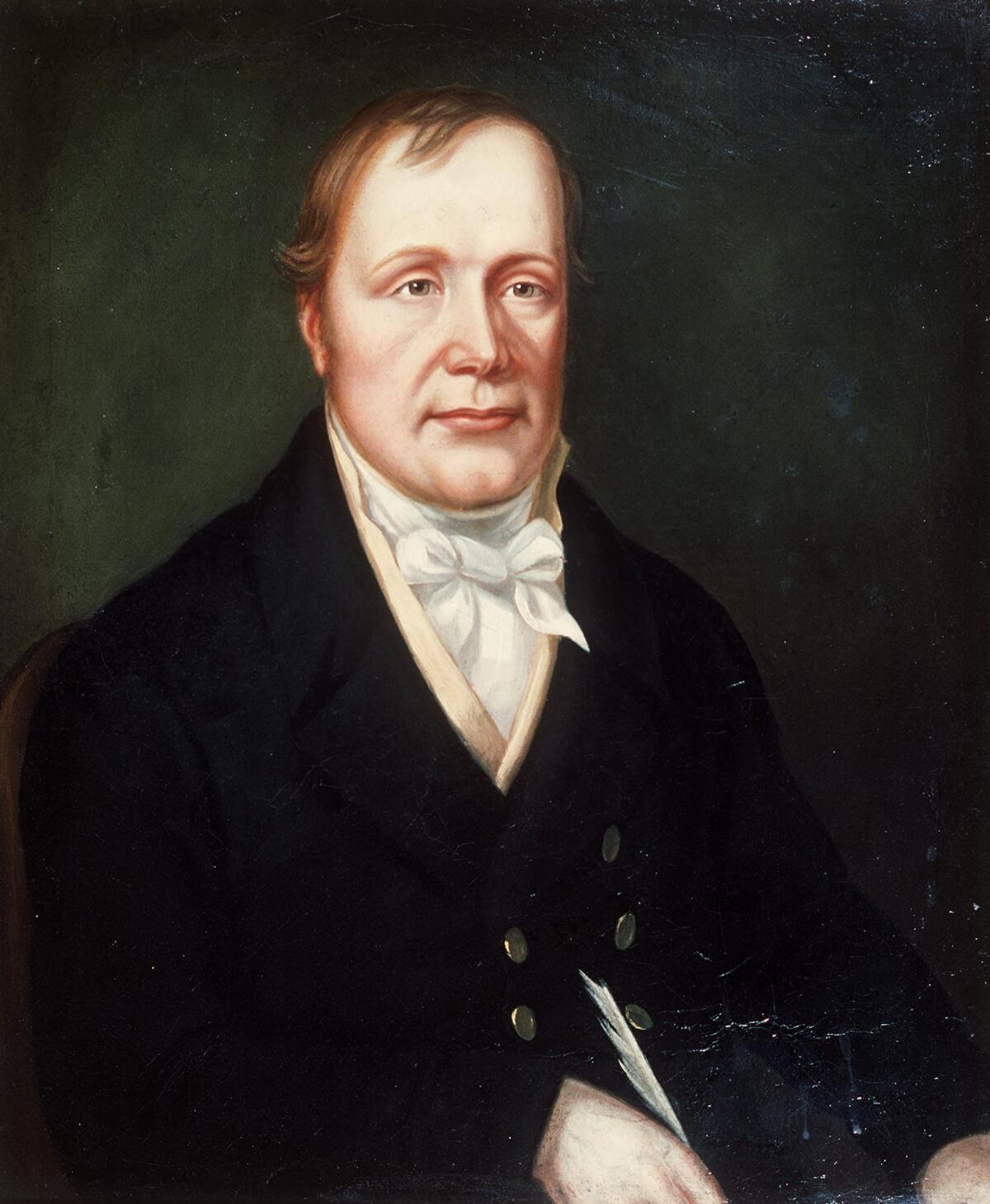
Jac Glan-y-gors (1766–1821), poet, political writer and satirist.

Many of these poets used the free metres, though rarely exclusively. Pughe, for example, would labour to show that the free metres could be used in Welsh to produce serious, sublime poetry, culminating in his publication of a translation of Paradise Lost in 1816; though he is far better known today for his controversial work as a lexicographer, whose influential Dictionary of 1803 contained many neologisms. Twm o'r Nant, Iolo Morganwg and in particular Jac Glan-y-gors also used the free metres extensively for satire, and Glan-y-gors in particular was a master. His most famous ballad is satire on anglicisation concerning the eponymous Dic Siôn Dafydd, a Welshman who returns to Wales having made his fortune in England and pretends to his mother that he can no longer understand Welsh; 'Dic Siôn Dafydd' entered the lexicon as a popular term for an anglicised Welshman is still used today. Glan-y-gors was also the author of radical political prose such as Seren tan Gwmmwl ('A Star in Cloud'; 1795), a pamphlet which effectively introduced the Enlightenment ideas contained in Thomas Paine's The Rights of Man to the Welsh context.

==== The Eisteddfod and the Gorsedd ====
The major collective achievement of the Gwyneddigion was the establishment of the Eisteddfod tradition in the form it exists today. While there had been documented examples of eisteddfodau being held at least as far back as 1176, little is really known about their form other than that they were public competitions between bards and musicians. Ad-hoc eisteddfodau were also known to have been held throughout the century, typically small meetings held in taverns. The Gwyneddigion took these traditions and formalised them with sets of rules which have remained a core part of Eisteddfodau ever since, such competing under pseudonyms, and setting the subjects of competitions centrally and in advance. The first Eisteddfod organised by the Gwyneddigion in Bala in 1789 is therefore often described as the first modern Eisteddfod, though it was not until much later (1860) that the National Eisteddfod, which continues today, was established.

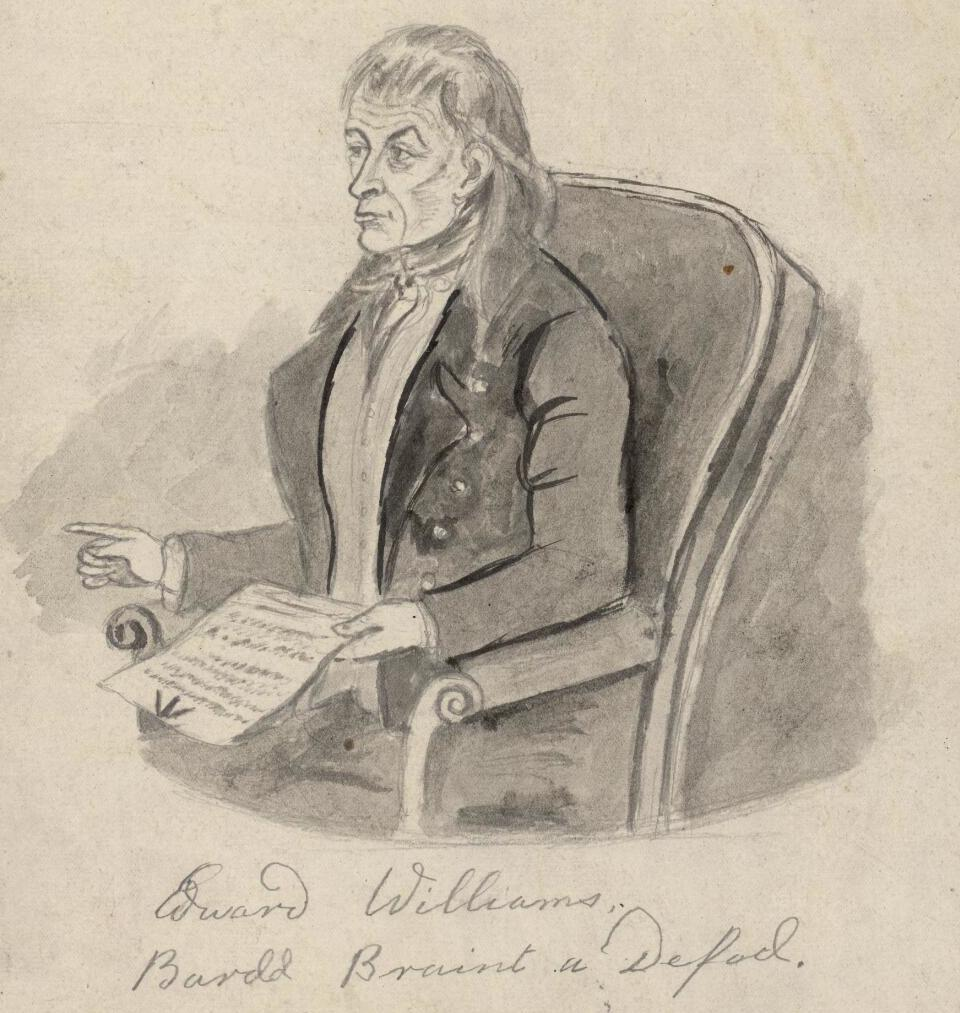
Iolo Morgannwg (1747–1826)

Working in parallel to the development of the Eisteddfod was the most famous of all the members of the Gwyneddigion: poet and mystic Iolo Morganwg (1747–1826). A fascinating, complex and controversial figure, as well as writing his own poetry he published collections of the work of earlier poets such as Dafydd ap Gwilym and established Gorsedd y Beirdd. A bardic society, Iolo claimed that Gorsedd y Beirdd was based on ancient Celtic druidic rituals; it held its first meetings in London in 1791–92. By the Carmarthen Eisteddfod of 1819 Iolo had succeeded in making the Gorsedd a major part of the Eisteddfod tradition. Celebrated in his lifetime and for much of the 19th century as a significant authority on bardic and druidic learning, by the 20th century it became widely accepted that many of his "discoveries" were in fact inventions and forgeries, including the Gorsedd, the "bardic alphabet" Coelbren y Beirdd, and dozens of poems attributed to real historical figures such as Dafydd ap Gwilym. Iolo's forgeries, occurring throughout his long career, are extremely numerous and typically serve to support his literary theories, prejudices and suppositions, or otherwise to glorify the Welsh poetic tradition (for example, allegedly medieval poems prophesising subsequent historical events). A key concern of Iolo's was the elevation of his native Glamorgan and its role in the bardic tradition, and many of his forgeries sought to reinforce the idea that Glamorgan had been a region of poetic excellence and innovation. There are also forgeries, however, to which there is no obvious purpose: it has been suggested he may have been exhibiting some kind of compulsive disorder which compelled him to fabricate materials. Iolo's fabrications were accepted largely without question for almost a hundred years, and his forgeries and false theories litter the anthologies and scholarship of the 19th century. Paradoxically, he also produced a good deal of genuine and often brilliant scholarship, and as collector of manuscripts preserved many genuine works which would otherwise have been lost. Despite its fraudulent origins the Gorsedd survives to this day and has become a tradition in its own right, as have many of the ceremonies and rituals derived from Iolo's inventions, which remain a prominent part of the National Eisteddfod.

=== Folk literature ===
While the Cymmrodorion had had a definite elitist streak, being often dismissive of poetry in the free metres and other popular forms, the Gwyneddigion were more inclusive and many of their members such as Twm o'r Nant (1739–1810) and Jac Glan-y-gors (1766–1821) were active in more popular genres such as the ballad and songs.

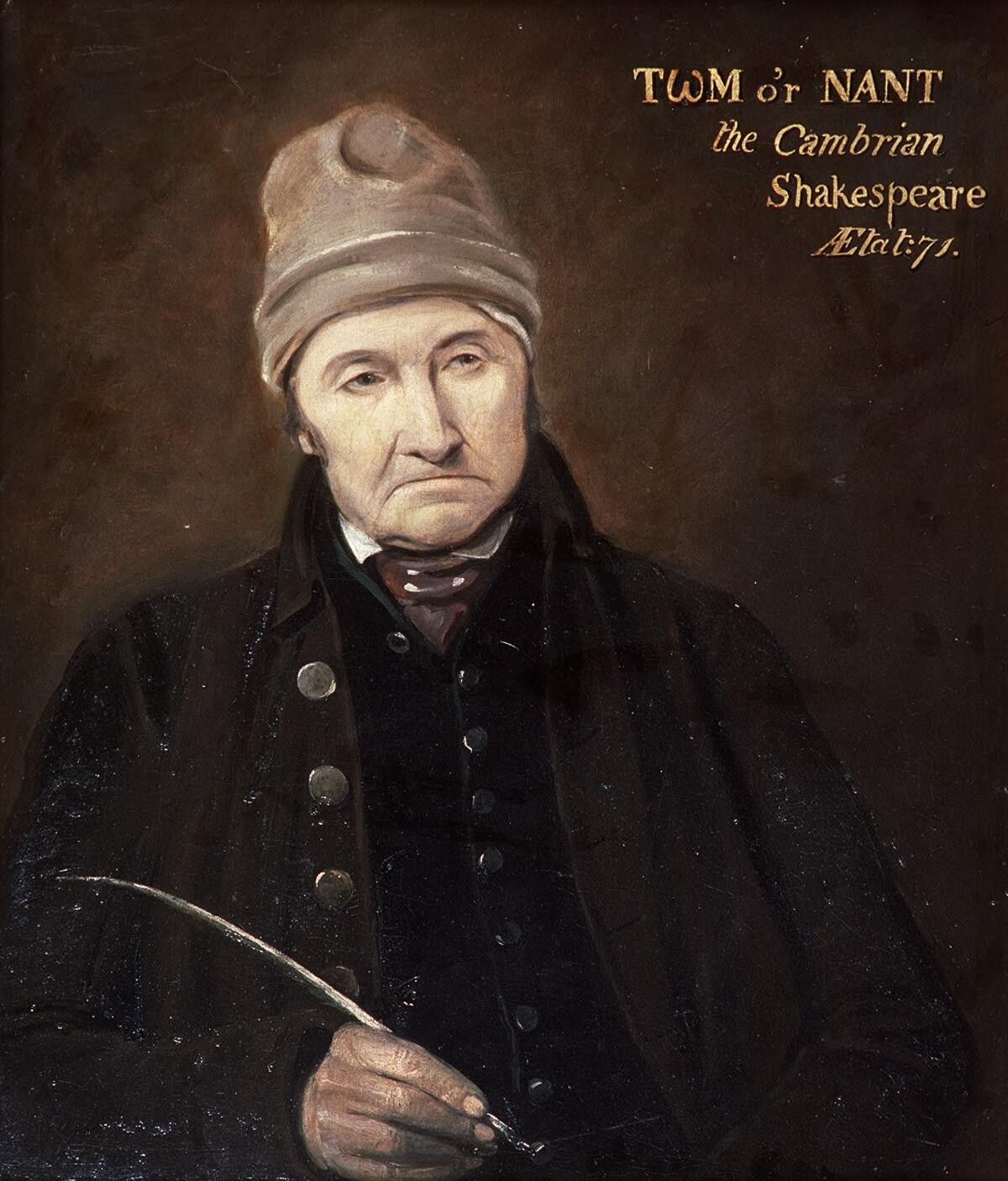
Twm o'r Nant (1776–1810)

Although the anterliwt had been a popular form in the previous century and possibly earlier (see above), the eighteenth century was the golden age of the form and the majority of the surviving examples date from this period. Though some are anonymous, many were by known writers such as Huw Jones o Langwm (d. 1782), Elis y Cowper (d. 1789), Jonathan Hughes (1721–1805) and Twm o'r Nant (1739–1810), all of whom came from the north-east of Wales, which became the part of the country most strongly associated with the form. Most of these writers were also associated with folk genres such as the ballad. Anterliwtiau by Twm o'r Nant, who can justifiably be considered the central figure of the genre, were especially popular and often incorporated social criticism of the ills of the day such as greedy landowners or unpopular taxes. Due in part to their bawdy content, however, anterliwtiau had always been the subject of disapproval from more conservative circles, and the spread of Methodism – which was itself often the subject of the satire in anterliwtiau – meant that as the century wore on anterliwtiau become both more respectable and less popular. Even Twm o'r Nant turned away from the genre for a period, though he would return to it later. While a handful of anterliwtiau survive from the early years of the 19th century the genre had to all intents and purposes disappeared by the time of Twm's death in 1810.

== 19th century ==
Due mainly to the Industrial Revolution, the 19th century was an enormously transformative period in Wales. In 1800 the Welsh population of approximately 600,000 was mainly rural and almost entirely Welsh-speaking (with the majority monoglot); but by the turn of the 20th century the population had grown fivefold and was now predominantly urban due to a combination of natural growth and significant immigration, particularly into the South Wales Valleys. Whilst there was significant internal migration within Wales as well, many newcomers were English or Irish. Although some learned Welsh and integrated into their new communities, in places where immigration was very significant English displaced Welsh as the community language, and by the end of the 19th century about half the Welsh population could speak English, many of them bilingual. Taken together, it has been argued that Wales underwent a greater cultural and demographic change over the course of the 19th century than it had in any previous period in its history.

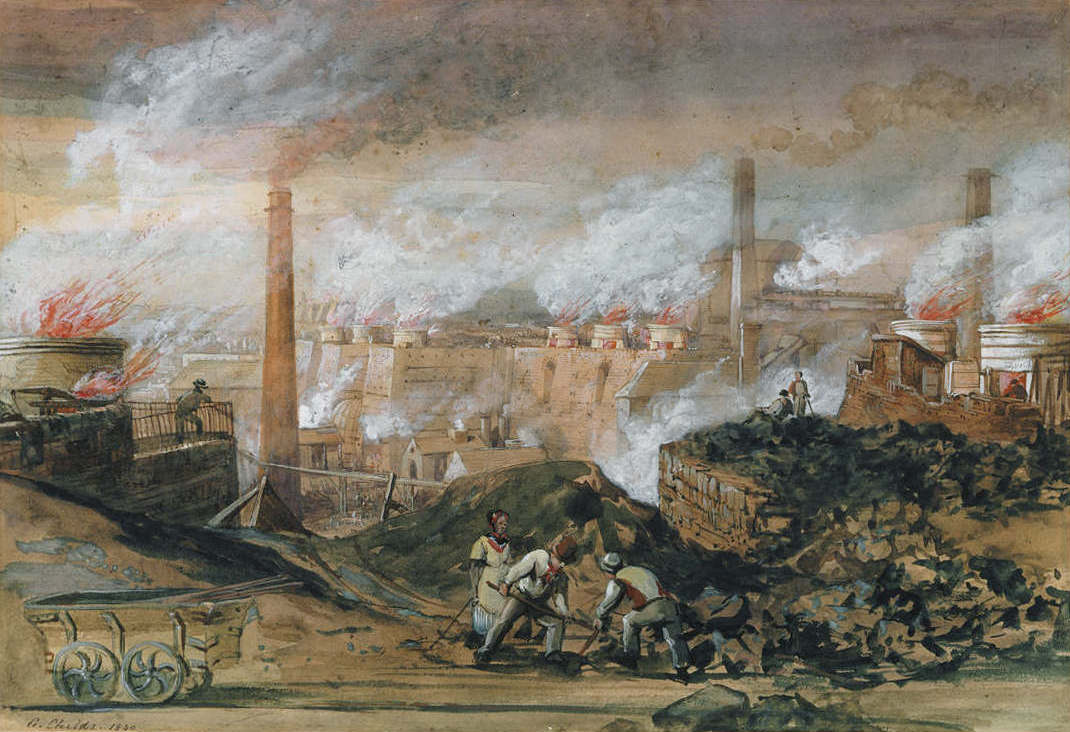
Dowlais Ironworks (1840) by George Childs (1798–1875)

Despite this relative decline, however, the Welsh speaking population increased significantly in absolute terms, peaking as late as 1911 with over one million recorded in Wales as able to speak Welsh. To these should be added a significant diaspora elsewhere. Literacy in Welsh also increased significantly, not due to public education (which was extremely limited for most of the century and, where it existed at all, focused entirely on English) but due to the efforts of the nonconformist Sunday Schools which flourished as a part of the ongoing Methodist revival. Nonconformist denominations collectively dominated Welsh cultural life by the middle of the 19th century. Facilitated by economic growth and falling publishing costs, this growth in population and literacy led to a huge increase in the output of literature in Welsh in the form of books, periodicals, newspapers, poetry, novels, ballads and sermons, all of which were provided in copious quantities in what has been described as the "Golden Age" of the Welsh-language press. Estimates suggest that over 10,000 books in Welsh were published over the course of the 19th century, a remarkable figure when compared to other stateless languages such as Irish. This represented an enormous increase in the quantity and variety of literature available in Welsh. Its character was influenced by the sometimes competing values of the Eisteddfod, the nonconformist tradition, and wider developments in Western Aesthetics such as Romanticism. During this period Welsh became an international language, with newspapers and periodicals in Welsh published locally by and for the Welsh-speaking diaspora in London, Liverpool, Manchester, the United States, Argentina and Australia.

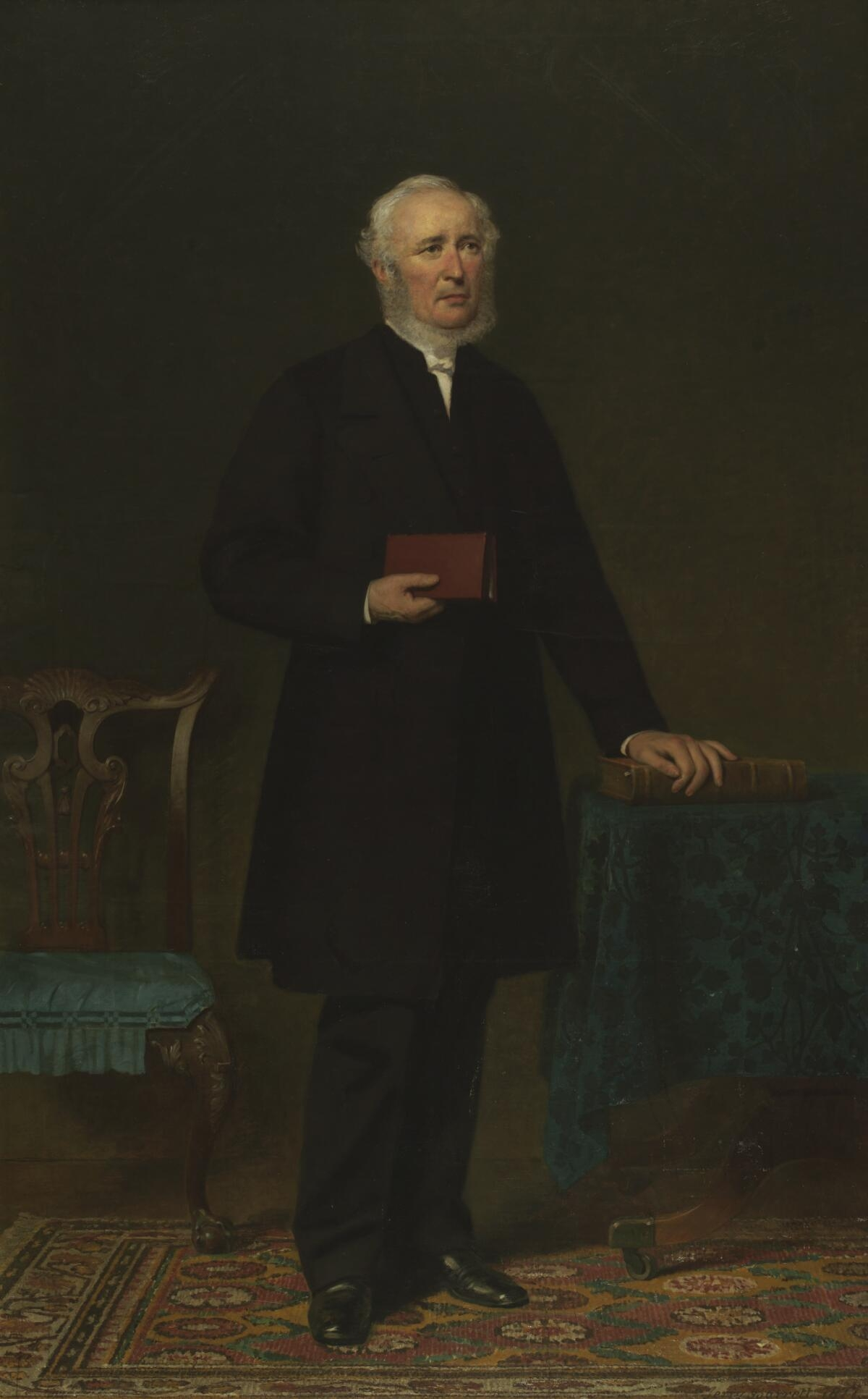
Lewis Edwards (1809–1887), a key figure in 19th century Wales.

This explosion in quantity was not always reflected in quality, however, and a critical consensus had emerged by the 20th century that, taken together, the bulk of 19th-century literature in Welsh was of a poor quality. This view can be seen espoused in the work of most major 20th century critics in Welsh such as W. J. Gruffydd, Saunders Lewis and Thomas Parry, as well as later critics such as Hywel Teifi Edwards. The influence of the chapels, though sometimes credited with ensuring the survival of Welsh as a living language, was not necessarily entirely positive: some commentators suggested that the channelling of so much energy into religion had a negative impact on literature on the whole. The Treachery of the Blue Books is also cited as a factor, contributing to an obsession that literature should contribute to the reader's spiritual and/or moral wellbeing, which might come at the expense of considerations of literary merit. Nevertheless, others such as R. M. Jones have challenged the consensus that the Welsh literature of the 19th century was poor, and even those broadly critical of the century's output as a whole have championed individual poets and authors and held up individual works as major contributions to literature in Welsh.

As in previous centuries, poetry remained the focus of much creative activity in Welsh, much of it now written within the vibrant Eisteddfod tradition. However, there was also much creative prose work: the first novels and short stories in Welsh had emerged by the middle of the century, and the first works of children's literature appeared soon afterwards. The Welsh societies (see above) continued, but they were far less influential after the first decade of the century, their role largely taken over by an informal network of Anglican vicars referred to retroactively as the Hen Bersoniaid Llengar ('The Old Literary Parsons'). They worked in various ways to promote the literature of past and present; they helped bridge the gap between the Gwyneddigion societies and the professional Welsh scholarship which emerged at Oxford and the fledgling University of Wales by the end of the century. Throughout the century antiquarians, historians, scholars, linguists, and lexicographers including Iolo Morgannwg (1747–1826), William Owen Pughe (1759–1835), Carnhuanawc (1787–1848), Lewis Edwards (1809–1887), Thomas Stephens (1821–1875), John Rhŷs (1840–1915) and John Morris-Jones (1864–1929) made significant – though sometimes controversial – contributions to the re-discovery of Wales, its language and literature. Some figures from outside Wales also contributed, such as Charlotte Guest (1812–1895), Matthew Arnold (1822–1888) and Ernest Renan (1823–1892). Much of this scholastic activity can be viewed as a part of the wider Celtic revival of the period. This influence was not always positive, with the work of Pughe in particular often being blamed for tortuous, unnaturalistic neologisms in the work of many poets of this period. At the same time others produced less figures like Thomas Gee (1815–1898), who published Encyclopaedia Cambrensis, a 9,000-page encyclopaedia that remains the largest ever single paper publication in the Welsh language. Travel writers such as Cranogwen (1839–1916) and O. M. Edwards (1858–1920) sought to teach the Welsh about the wider world. Cranogwen also wrote proto-feminist journalism, whilst R. J. Derfel (1824–1905) wrote about radical politics in Welsh; and Emrys ap Iwan (1848–1906) was one of the first original Welsh-language philosophers and political writers.

=== Poetry ===
==== Hymns ====
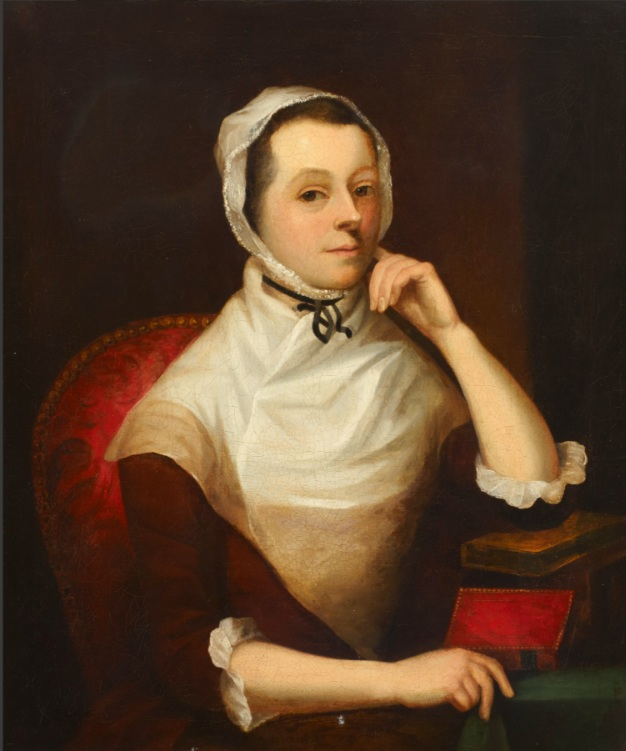
Ann Griffiths (1776–1805)

Developments in Welsh poetry in the first decades of the 19th century continued the trends established in the 18th. As the Methodist revival continued and nonconformist chapels took increasing hold of the spiritual lives of Wales's population, a strong native tradition of hymn-writing emerged, drawing on the example of Williams Pantycelyn (see above). Prominent Welsh hymn-writers of this first part of the century included David Charles (1762–1834) and Robert ap Gwilym Ddu (1766–1850); however, undoubtedly the finest and most influential figure in this tradition in this period (and perhaps any) was the short-lived Ann Griffiths (1776–1805)^{B}. She died in comparative obscurity and her complete poetic output consists of only seventy stanzas over twenty-seven hymns, but she was later recognised as a major religious poet of almost cult-like popularity and an important figure in Welsh nonconformism; she was even the subject of a 21st-century musical. She was the first female writer to be widely acknowledged as a part of the literary canon in Welsh: she is the only female poet included in the Oxford Book of Welsh Verse in 1962.

Many hymns from this period are sung in chapels and churches to this day. The hymn in Welsh is inextricably linked with the nonconformist tradition thanks to the enduring influence of Williams Pantycelyn (see 18th Century above), but it quickly developed into a cross-denominational tradition, with hymn-writers such as Ieuan Glan Geirionydd (1795–1855) and Nicander (1809–1874) working in the Established Church. They, alongside Methodists like Eben Fardd (1802–1863), Congregationalists like Gwilym Hiraethog (1802–1883) and others like Robert ap Gwilym Ddu (1766–1850) who were not committed to any denomination would also make significant contributions to the Welsh hymn in the second quarter of the century. However, notwithstanding the contribution of later hymn-writers such as Elfed (1860–1953), in the view of R. M. Jones, there was little development in Welsh hymn-writing after the 1850s, which Jones attributed to the increasing respectability and establishment nature of nonconformity by the later part of the century.

==== The Growth of the Eisteddfod ====
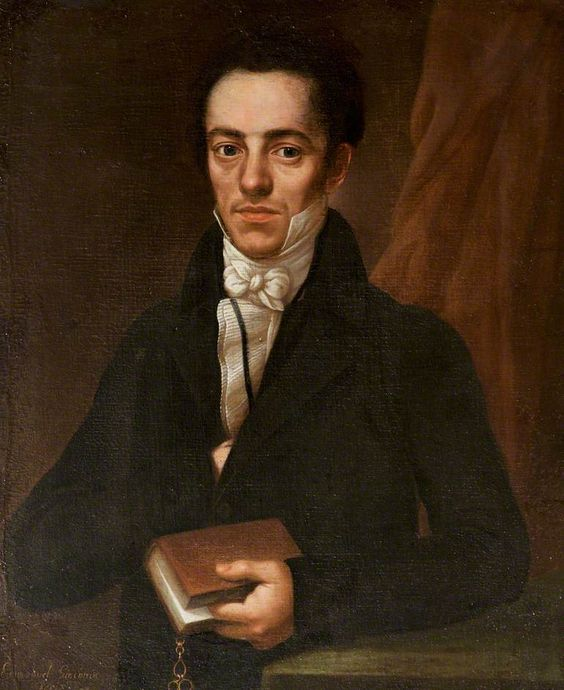
Carnhuanawc (Thomas Price; 1787–1848), one of the Hen Bersoniaid Llengar.

After the codification of the modern Eisteddfod by the Gwyneddigion in the 1790s, by the early 19th century Eisteddfodau on the Gwyneddigion model were regularly being held across Wales. While these were modest, ad-hoc festivals – the regular National Eisteddfod was not formally established until 1860 – they provided regular opportunities for poets to compete in a range of competitions; in an age when journalism was limited and Wales had no real national institutions, Eisteddfod success provided a means for poets – who were frequently labourers or craftsmen, and unlikely to have had much formal education unless they were vicars – to achieve genuine local and even national fame. The Gwyneddigion had largely ceased their meaningful activity and following end of the disruption caused by the Napoleonic Wars the baton would be picked up by what became later known as the Hen Bersoniaid Llengar – "The Old Literary Parsons", a loose grouping of curates in the Church of England such as Thomas Beynon (1744–1833), Gwallter Mechain (1761–1849), Ifor Ceri (1770–1829) and Carnhuanawc (1787–1848) and later Harry Longueville Jones (1806–1870) and Ab Ithel (1811–1862). A key early achievement was the Eisteddfod was the one organised in Carmarthen in 1819, primarily by Ifor Ceri. This was the first of the "Provincial Eisteddfodau" of 1819–1934 and far exceeded any of the previous Eisteddfodau in scale, spreading beyond poetry competitions to include competitions for essays and scholarship as well as music and dance. It was also notable for the presence of Iolo Morgannwg, by then in his seventies, who ensured that the Gorsedd had a major presence at the Carmarthen Eisteddfod, a link which has remained ever since.

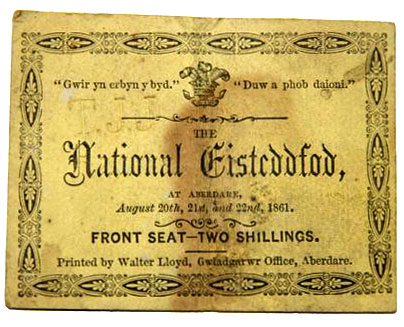
Seat ticket for the 1861 Eisteddfod; entirely in English except for the motto.

The 19th century Eisteddfod is the direct predecessor of the various modern Eisteddfodau, but while these are often described today as bastions of the Welsh language and culture, throughout the 19th century the relationship was more complex. The Hen Bersoniaid and their successors coveted the attention and patronage of the landed gentry who had been effectively completely anglicised by this point; although they had some genuine success with individuals like Augusta Hall (1802–1896), this desire to appeal to Victorian sensibilities led to the inclusion of things like essays (in English) on Social Science and even Mathematics. Whilst the musical competitions did provide an outlet for Welsh composers like John Thomas or Joseph Parry they called more often for performances of choral or operatic works in Italian, German or English by Handel and Mendelssohn and would be judged by Englishmen like Charles Villiers Stanford, with the choral competitions in particular often won by visiting English choirs. This all drew crowds and patronage but did nothing to promote anything Welsh. Whilst the main poetic competitions remained for works written in Welsh, there were also competitions for writing in English and translation into English (almost never into Welsh), and speeches and adjudications would frequently be delivered in English even for literary compositions in Welsh. In 1873 the Welsh-language magazine Y Faner would note – with approval – that three-quarters of the speeches at the National Eisteddfod that year had been in English. The social science section would set essays on the utility or value of Welsh, with authors both for and against the language in agreement that the Welsh needed to learn English, and in the 1867 Eisteddfod English poet Matthew Arnold would deliver a lecture in which he urged the Welsh not to "give offence to practical men" by resisting the spread of English. Whilst vague expressions of Welsh patriotism were ubiquitous at the Eisteddfod, in the Welsh press and the literature of the period they were almost always within a British framework which little resembled 20th century Welsh nationalism. Indeed, it has been claimed that the 19th century is remarkable for the lack of engagement of Welsh speakers with the threat to the future of their own language: where the question was addressed at all it is typically with either a naive optimism that the Welsh would always speak Welsh or a fatalistic belief that its extinction was inevitable, even on the part of major literary figures who were writing innovative literature in Welsh. It was only in the last decade of the century and the efforts of Emrys ap Iwan (1848–1906) and O. M. Edwards (1858–1920) among others that this began to be meaningfully challenged and the argument put forward that the survival of Welsh as a living language was both possible and desirable; and it was not until the 20th century and the adoption, as late as 1950, of what is now known as Y Rheol Gymraeg ('The Welsh (language) rule') – which stipulates that all speeches and competitions at the Eisteddfod must be in Welsh – that the Eisteddfod became the predominantly Welsh-language institution which it remains to this day.

==== Eisteddfod poetry ====
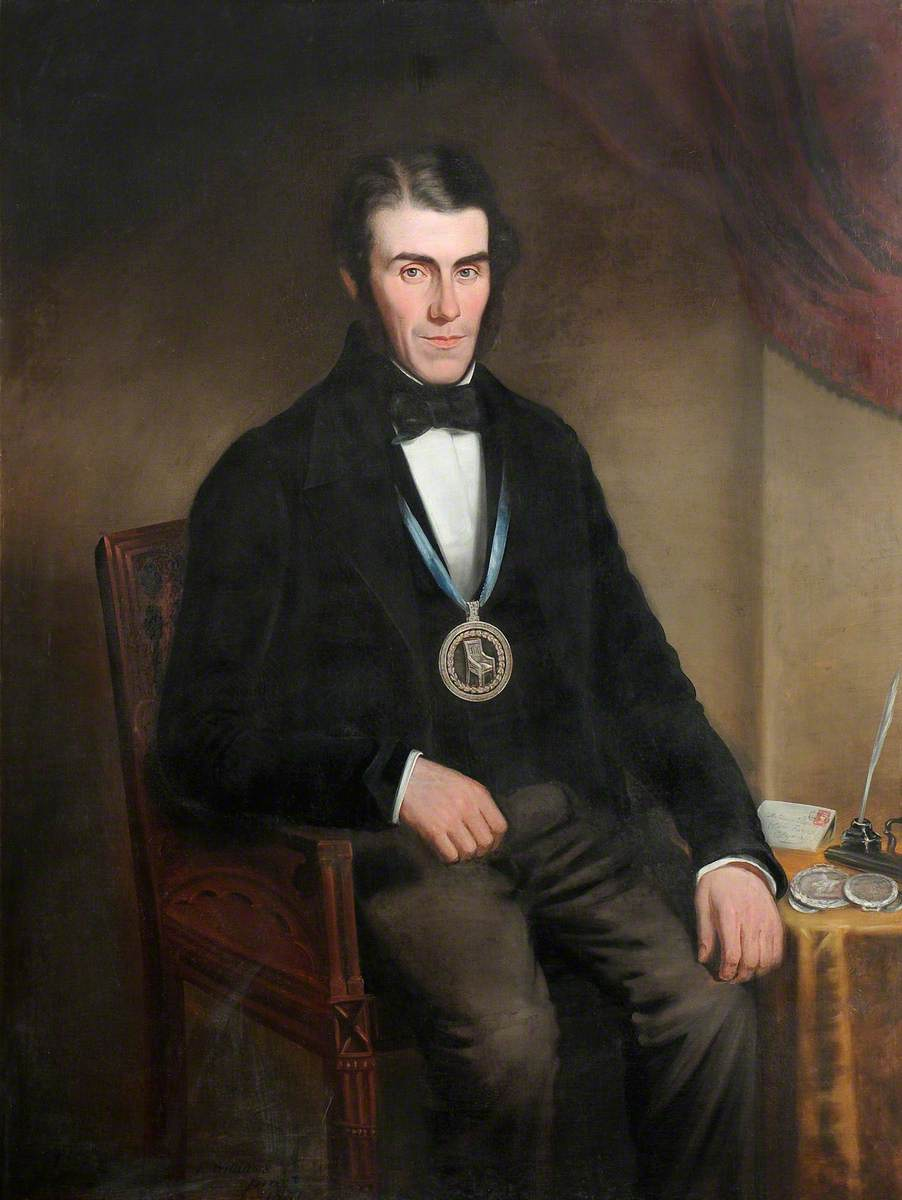
Eben Fardd (Ebenezer Thomas, 1802–1863), one of the most successful poets of the early 19th century in Welsh. The three medals are for his chairs won at the Eisteddfodau held in Welshpool (1824), Liverpool (1840) and Llangollen (1858).

The most prestigious award at each Eisteddfod was the Chair, usually awarded for an awdl in the strict metres. Poets used bardic names to disguise their identity in competitions, and often continued to use them when they became well known. With the exception of the dedicated hymn-writers (see above) and rare exceptions like Robert ap Gwilym Ddu (1766–1850), who eschewed competition altogether, Eisteddfod success was the ambition of all the major poets of the first part of the century. They can be loosely divided into two schools: the classicists such as Dafydd Ddu Eryri (1759–1722), Dewi Wyn o Eifion (1784–1841), Caledfryn (1801–1869) and (initially at least) Eben Fardd (1802–1863) upheld Goronwy Owen (see above) as the ideal, and favoured the strict metres and traditional forms such as the englyn, the cywydd and the awdl; whilst the lyrical school of poets such as Ieuan Glan Geirionydd (1795–1855), Alun (1797–1840), Gwilym Hiraethog (1802–1883), Gwenffrwd (1810–1834), Creuddynfab (1814–1869) and Daniel Silvan Evans (1818–1903) preferred the free metres, writing telynegion (lyrics) and pryddestau. The lyrical school showed a more overt influence from contemporary English poetry but had also been influenced by native folk literature, and Goronwy Owen's ideal of a Miltonian epic remained the ideal of both schools. The distinction between the two was not always clear, with some like Eben Fardd and Gwilym Hiraethog maintaining a foot in both camps, Gwallter Mechain (1761–1849) attempting to forge a middle path and others such as Talhaiarn (1810–1869) defending cynghanedd in his critical writing whilst largely eschewing it himself; however, the debate between the strict and free metres would dominate poetic discourse in Welsh for much of the century. Initially most obvious in the work of the lyrical school and the middle period of Eben Fardd's work, Romanticism had become the dominant aesthetic in both forms by the middle of the century.

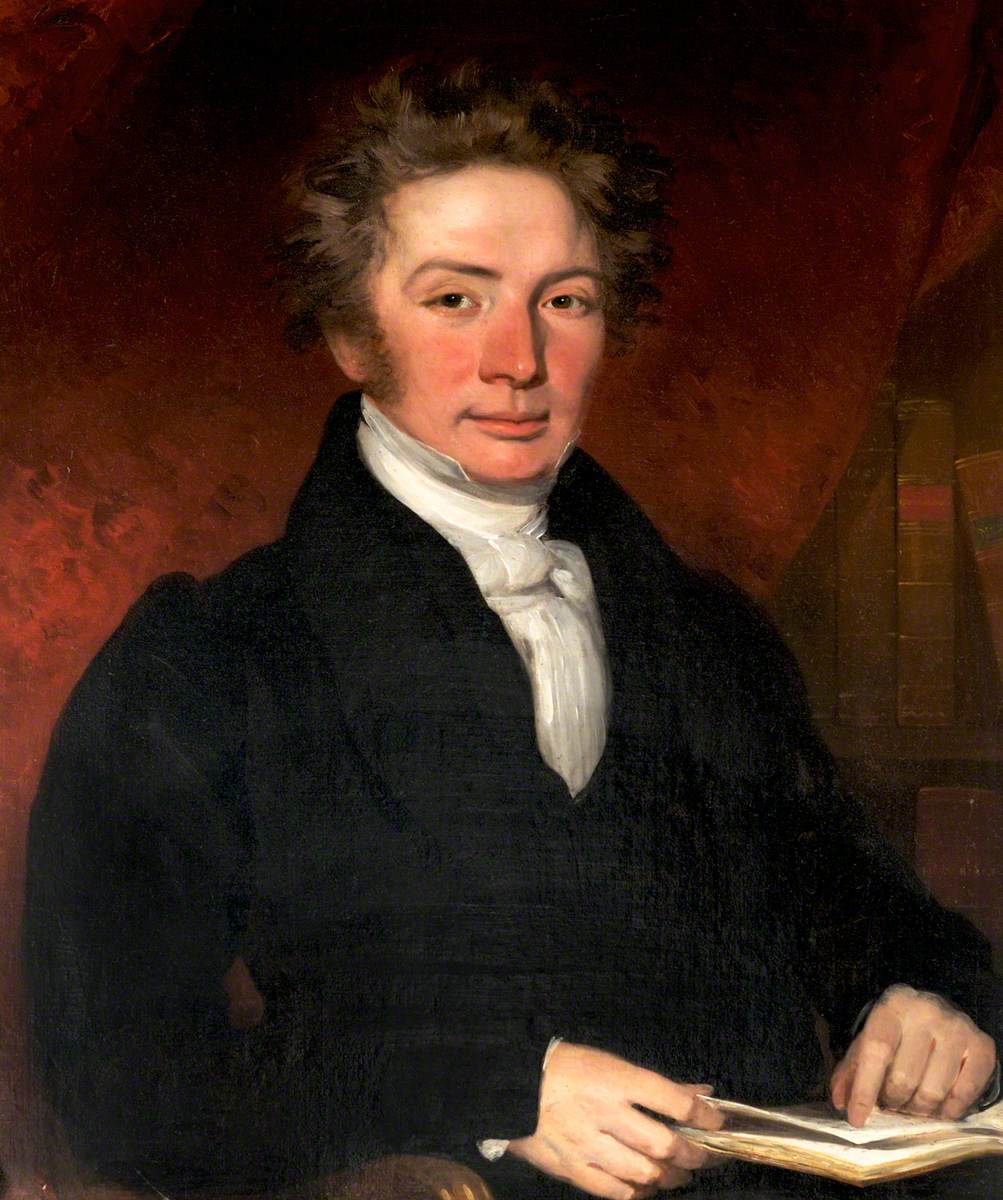
Ieuan Glan Geirionydd (Evan Evans, 1795–1855)

Eben Fardd ("Eben the Poet") was one of the most successful Eisteddfod competitors of his age and alongside Caledfryn made a significant impact also as an Eisteddfod adjudicator; his most famous poem, Dinistr Jerusalem ("the Destruction of Jerusalem", depicting the Siege of Jerusalem) has been described as "one of the finest awdlau in Welsh" and "a high point of Eisteddfod strict metre poetry"; his shorter poetry has also been highly praised. Alongside him, perhaps the most notable poet of this generation was Ieuan Glan Geirionydd, described as "the most versatile poet of the [19th] century". He was highly thought of by Saunders Lewis for poems such as Ysgoldy Rhad Llanrwst ('Llanrwst's Cheap School'), who saw in his work a distinctive stoicism. Particularly by the end of his life he was associated with a turn away from cynghanedd towards the free metres. The same could be said of another influential poet, Alun, whom with Ieuan Glan Geirionydd made up the main proponents of the lyrical school, though both poets had composed awdlau earlier in their careers which have been favourably compared to those of the 20th century. Caledfryn was perhaps the most influential of the poets who maintained a strict loyalty to cynghanedd, as much through his often scathing criticism as an Eisteddfod adjudicator as through his own verse.

Though the Eisteddfod had provided a major impetus for the composition of strict metre poetry and a path for poets to attain genuine national celebrity status, poets as far back as Goronwy Owen in the 18th century had questioned whether cynghanedd was suitable to write the kind of epic poetry written by English poets such as John Milton, which was held in high esteem at the time. While neo-classicists such as Caledfryn continued to champion cynghanedd, other figures such as the short-lived Gwenffrwd (1810–1834) and the influential Gwallter Mechain (1761–1849) went so far as to directly criticise the strict metres. Mechain and his disciples, among them Ieuan Glan Geirionydd, set out to compose pryddestau. This new form of long poem – poems of many thousands of lines were common – was effectively a free metre equivalent of the awdl in which the poet could adopt any number of free metres over an extended work. An influential early pryddest was Eben Fardd's Yr Atgyfodiad ("the Resurrection") which, though unsuccessful at the Rhuddlan Eisteddfod in 1850, proved enormously influential on subsequent works, beginning what E. G. Millward referred to as the "golden age" of the pryddest. An ongoing and sometimes fierce debate in the press over the relative merits of cynghanedd and the free metres led to the eventual establishment of the National Eisteddfod's Crown, first awarded in 1880 for the best pryddest, nominally of equal prestige to the chair. The Crown is still awarded today at the National Eisteddfod as the main award for free meter poetry, though often now for a series of shorter poems rather than a single pryddest as was originally the case.

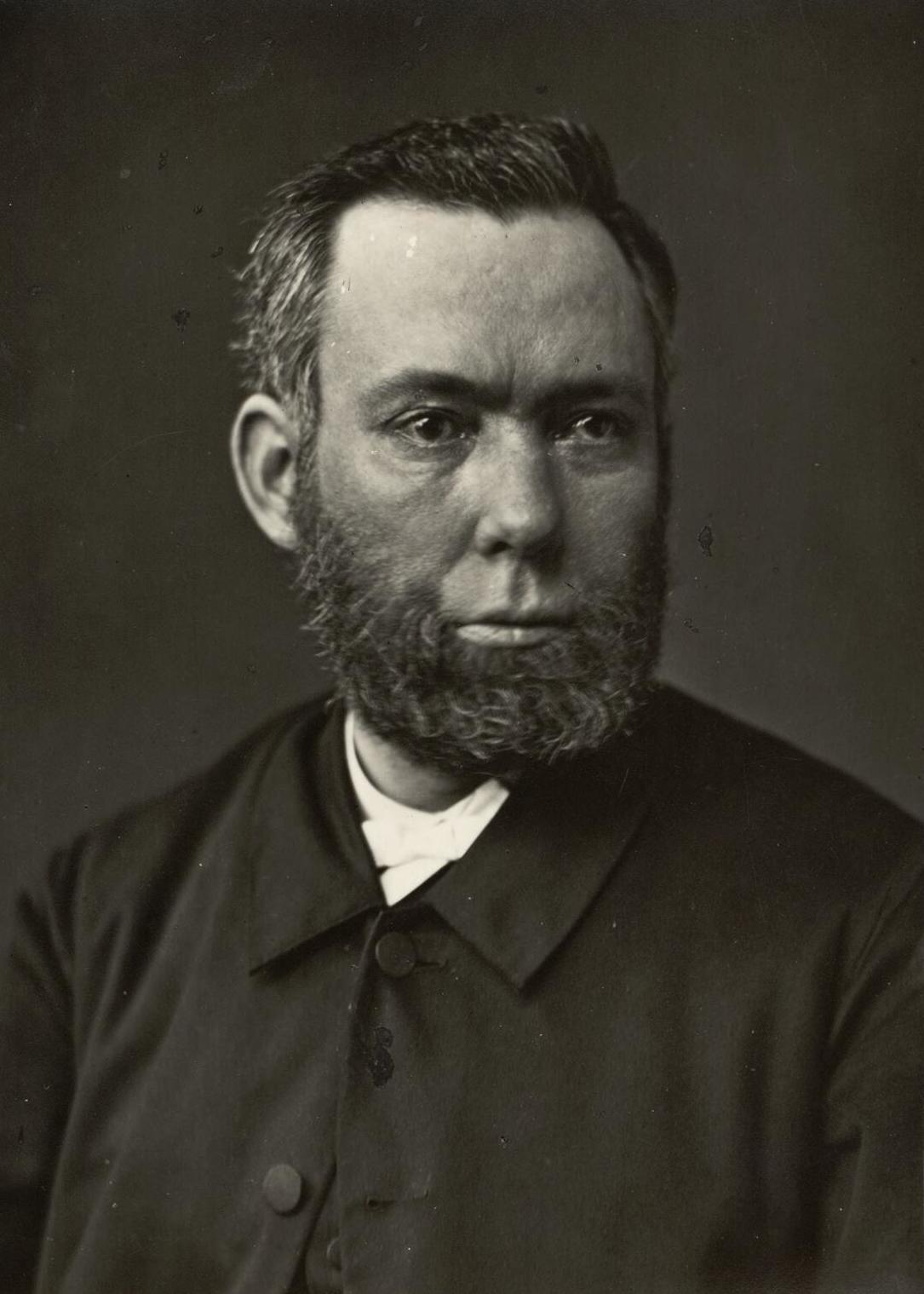
Islwyn (1832–1878), one of the most highly regarded poets of the 19th century among 20th century critics.

Of all the streams of Welsh poetry in the 19th century it is perhaps the pryddest which is the most contentious. Dozens of epic pryddestau, typically on either biblical themes or depicting passages from Welsh history, were composed by poets such as Iorwerth Glan Aled (1819–1867), Llew Llwyfo (1831–1901) and Golyddan (1840–1862) in an attempt to create a Welsh equivalent to Paradise Lost. None succeeded: despite its influence and popularity at the time Eben Fardd's Yr Atgyfodiad is almost unknown today and was condemned by later critics. Thomas Parry considered all the works of the century in the form to be completely without "poetic merit"; and Ioan Williams singled out Gwilym Hiraethog's enormous pryddest Emmanuel, published in two volumes during the 1860s, as "probably the longest poem written in Welsh and possibly the worst written in any language." Others have identified merit in individual examples, however, such as R. M. Jones who identified Iesu (Jesus) by Golyddan and particularly the second of two pryddestau titled Y Storm by Islwyn (1832–1878) as masterpieces. It is perhaps significant, however, that the second Y Storm, which was not published in its original form until 1990, can hardly be considered representative of the 19th century pryddest nor of the Welsh epic: it is a rambling, mystic meditation on mortality rather than a coherent narrative poem, was not composed for an Eisteddfod competition, and remained unpublished. Though comparatively obscure in his own lifetime Islwyn has since become recognised as one of the major poets of the century in the Welsh language. Much of Islwyn's poetry (including Y Storm) was inspired by the early death of his fiancée in 1853 and is frequently extremely bleak in tone. His output is uneven in quality and many critics have suggested that he had produced all his significant poetry in the space of a few years in his early twenties, after which he produced little other than uninspired awdlau in a futile attempt to win the National Eisteddfod Chair. Nevertheless, at its best, including in both versions of Y Storm, Islwyn's work shows a "complexity of imagery and intellectual ambition rare in any Welsh poetry of the period." One critic went so far as to say, "If the 19th century has a great poet [in Welsh], it is Islwyn"; and he was perhaps the main influence on the generation of Eisteddfod poets active in the last quarter of the 19th century (see below).

==== Mid–19th-century lyric poetry ====
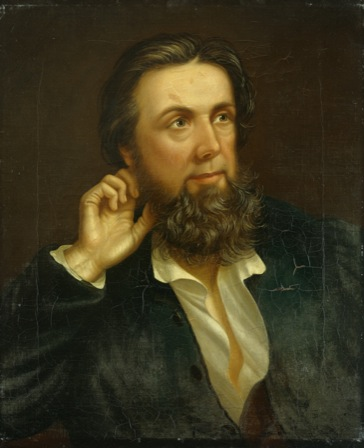
Talhaiarn (John Jones, 1810–1869), a key figure in Welsh Romanticism

Despite turning increasingly to cynghanedd later in his life, Islwyn's writings on poetry advocated the free metres and lyric poetry, and notwithstanding the enormous efforts poets devoted to awdlau and pryddestau to compete at Eisteddfodau it is poetry in this vein which was the most popular of the period with a wider audience. Ieuan Glan Geirionydd and Alun had led the way in this regard in the earlier part of the century but it reached its full flowering in the work of the poets of the middle part of the century, particularly Talhaiarn (1810–1869), Mynyddog (1833–1877) and Ceiriog (1832–1887). Talhaiarn was a popular though controversial figure in his day due to his extravagant lifestyle, his willingness to argue against the Welsh orthodoxies of his time (he was an Anglican and a Tory), and his involvement in several Eisteddfod adjudication controversies. He composed popular lyrics for a great number of songs by composers of the day, much of which according to R. M. Jones were "superficial and tasteless" and yet in his finest poems, such as the long Tal ar Ben Bodran (Tal[haiarn] on Bodran Hill), Talhaiarn was a "unique, intelligent and experienced poet with something sobering to say about life". Saunders Lewis described Talhaiarn as "the only poet of his age who understood the tragedy of the life of man".

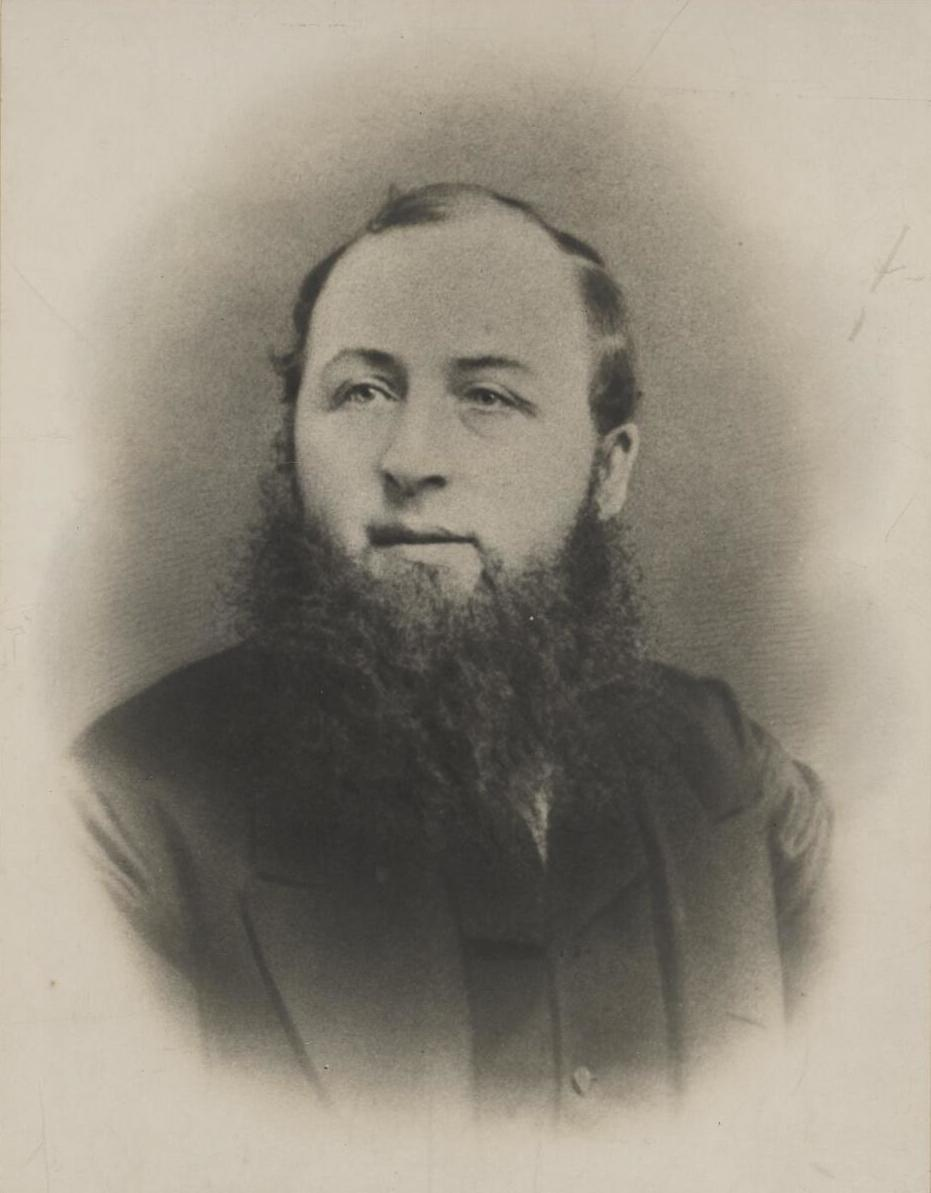
Ceiriog (1832–1887), the most popular Welsh poet of the 19th century.

As with Talhaiarn, music played a key role in the work of Mynyddog — perhaps best known now as the author of the lyrics to Myfanwy — and the best known of the Welsh lyric poets, Ceiriog (1832–1887). Ceiriog was the most popular Welsh poet of the 19th century: his collection Oriau'r Hwyr (The Late Hours) was outsold in the 1860s only by the Bible. Ceiriog's most successful lyrics such as Nant y Mynydd (The Mountain Stream) are direct, moving and effective, often describing rural and romantic scenes. They were an inspiration for 20th-century poets like R. Williams Parry, and some of Ceiriog's songs such as Ar Hyd y Nos remain familiar to many today. Ceiriog's poetry became strongly associated with a particular vision of Welshness, much in the way Robert Burns had become associated with Scotland; in one novel of 1905 the mother of a young Welshman migrating from Wales to America packs him a Bible and a book of Ceiriog's poetry. His work, however, is often criticised for its sentimentality and his desire to appeal to "the most basic tastes, the most simple desires and the ignorance" of his audience, and his reputation declined quickly in the 20th century.

==== Social radicalism in poetry ====
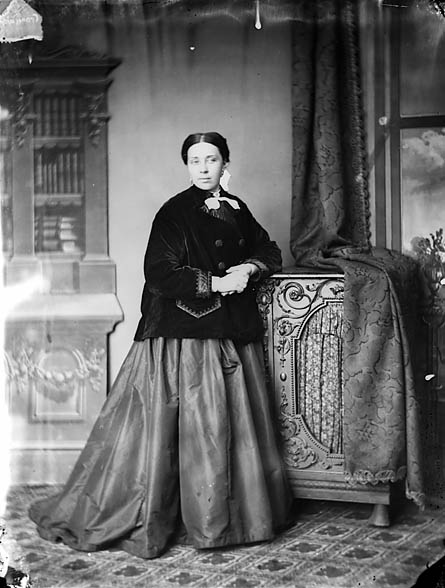
Cranogwen (1839–1916), one of the few prominent female poets in Welsh of the 19th century.

The worlds of the Eisteddfod and Welsh public life generally in the 19th century were dominated by men; however, female poets were able to break through, perhaps assisted by the Eisteddfod tradition of anonymous submission to competitions. To the name of Ann Griffiths (see above) can be added those of Jane Ellis (d.1840) and Elen Egryn (1807–1876) — both of whom have been claimed to be the first woman to have a book in Welsh published — as well as others such as Buddug (1842–1909). But perhaps most prominent of these female poets was Cranogwen (1839–1916), who laboured throughout a long career to further the course of Welsh women and was the major Welsh female voice of her day. Victorious in an 1865 Eisteddfod competition in which she beat both Islwyn and Ceiriog with a poem on Y Fodrwy Briodas (The Wedding Ring), she would later edit Y Frythones, a literary journal aimed at women through which she would support other literary Welsh women such as Ellen Hughes (1867–1927) and Mary Oliver Jones (1858–1893). Cranogwen's own work, which also encompassed travel writing, often has proto-feminist themes; it is also understood that she had relationships with women.

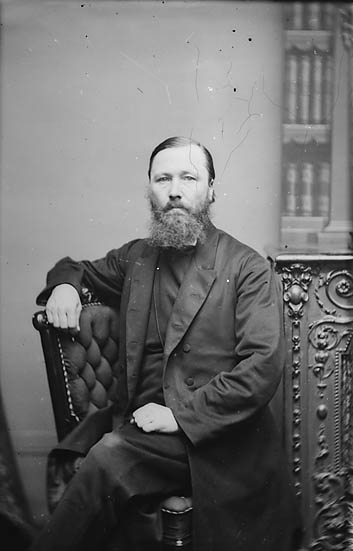
R. J. Derfel (1824–1905), radical socialist and poet.

While the work of many prominent Welsh poets of the period — including but not limited to Eben Fardd, Talhaiarn, Islwyn and Ceiriog — frequently features vague expressions of Welsh patriotism, rarely is there any real political undercurrent to these sentiments. Indeed, there are many poetic expressions in Welsh of loyalty to the British state, such as Eben Fardd's awdl Brwydr Maes Bosworth (the Battle of Bosworth Field), which ends with a paean to Queen Victoria, and many poems by the avowed Tory Talhaiarn. But by the later part of the century some poets were increasingly willing to use poetry to more express more radical political ideas, such as R. J. Derfel (1824–1905) and T. Gwynn Jones (1871–1948). An associate of Ceiriog who spent his whole adult life in England, Derfel came under the influence of Robert Owen and Karl Marx and would become one of the first major proponents of socialism in Welsh, including in his poetry. T. Gwynn Jones would later become regarded as a major poet of the 20th century (see below), but already by the end of the 19th he had published a good deal of poetry with radical political overtones, most notably the satirical Gwlad y Gân (The Land of Song). Influenced by thinkers like Emrys ap Iwan, Jones has been described as "the unofficial poet of the [proto-nationalist] Cymru Fydd movement".

==== The late 19th-century Eisteddfod and the Bardd Newydd ====
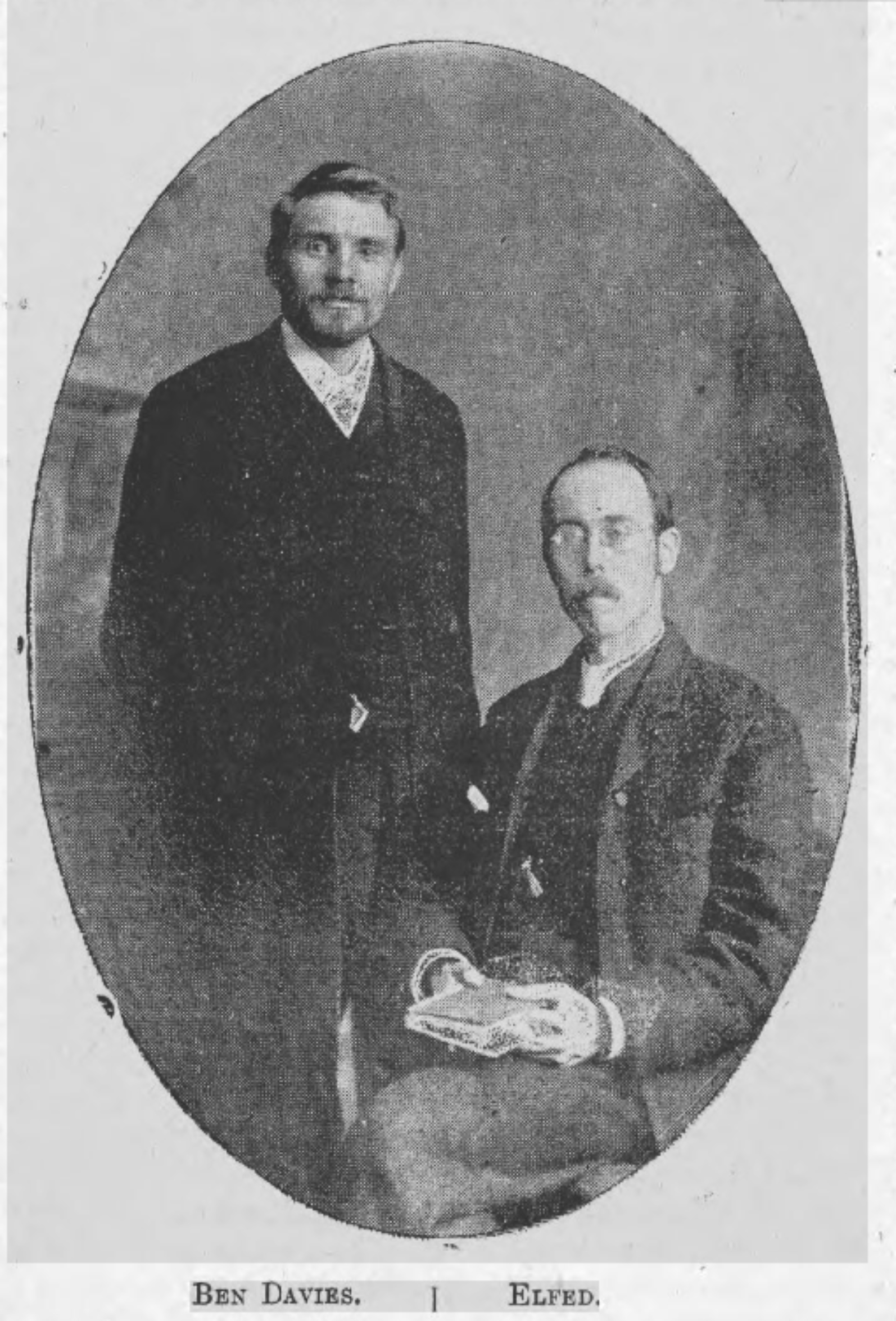
Ben Davies (left) and Elfed, victorious in the Crown and Chair respectively at the 1894 National Eisteddfod.

It is notable that despite multiple efforts in some cases, most of the above poets including Islwyn, Ceiriog, Talhaiarn and others failed to win the Chair or the Crown at the National Eisteddfod. Indeed, later critics have been virtually unanimous in their condemnation of almost all the 19th-century poets who did so. Poets such as Llew Llwyfo (1831–1901; two crowns), Iolo Caernarfon (1840–1914; two crowns), Cadvan (1842–1923; three crowns), Tudno (1844–1895; two chairs), Dyfed (1850–1923; four chairs, still a record), Pedrog (1853–1932; three chairs), Ben Davies (1864–1937; a chair and three crowns) and Job (1867–1938; three chairs and a crown) – many (though not all) of whom belonged to a loose grouping sometimes referred to as "y Bardd Newydd" (the New Poet) – are almost completely forgotten today. Drawing on the example of Islwyn (see above), the poetry of the Bardd Newydd was very often religious (many of these figures were preachers and ministers), frequently over-long, philosophical, mystical and ambiguous; these are in the words of Robert Rhys "the poet-preachers with their enormous compositions and prosaic styles who made perfect punching-bags for later critics". Alun Llywelyn-Williams went further and said of them: "The plain truth is that the Bardd Newydd was not a poet and had no grasp of poetry." Rhys singles out Elfed (1860–1953), who won a chair and two crowns in the 1880s and 1890s, as the most interesting of the successful Eisteddfod poets of the period, suggesting that some of the innovations of the poets of the 20th-century revival (see below) can be identified in his work – and yet that despite living to 1953 he made no further contribution to Welsh literature in the 20th century. His hymns, however, have remained popular.

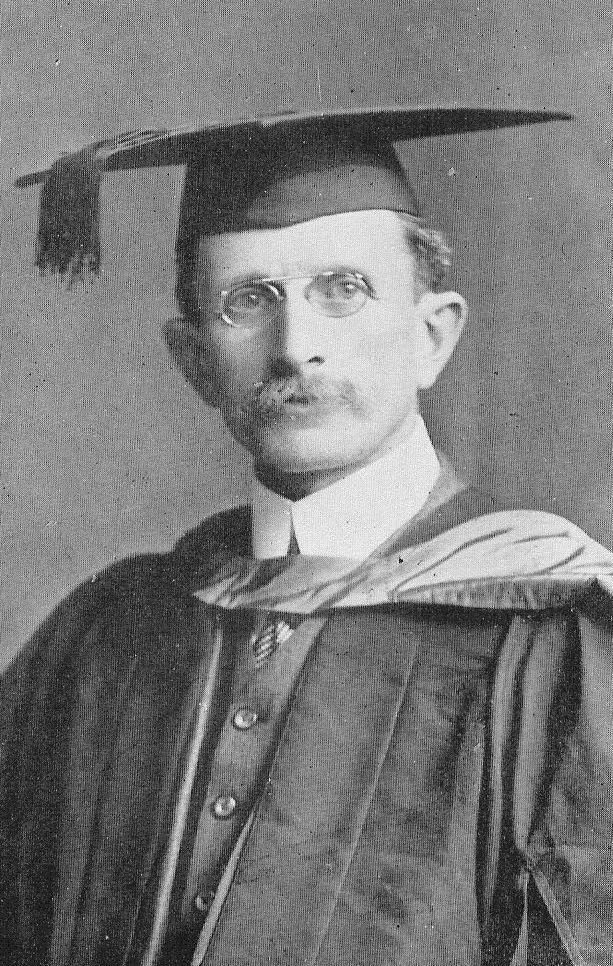
Eifion Wyn (1867–1926)

In parallel to the Bardd Newydd, poets such as Watcyn Wyn (1844–1905) and Eifion Wyn (1867–1926; no relation) continued the lyrical tradition of Ceiriog and Talhaiarn, producing romantic lyrics which would prove to be far more popular than the Eisteddfod poets' epics. By the end of the century, however, this tradition would be developed and built upon by more ambitious poets such as the Oxford-educated John Morris Jones (1864–1929). Morris-Jones's main legacy was to be in his capacity as a scholar and Eisteddfod adjudicator, the influence of which it is impossible to understate (see 20th century below), but in the closing decade of the 19th century he was an influential poet in his own right who imbued the lyrical tradition with an "academic confidence and authority". His awdlau Cymru Fu – Cymru Fydd ('Wales that was – Wales that will be') and Salm i Famon ('A Psalm to Mammon') use irony to express his social criticism of philistinism and materialism, and he was also a significant translator of poetry into Welsh, such as that of Heinrich Heine and Omar Khayyam. Though he wrote little poetry of his own after 1900, his influence on others was to make him a major figure in the revival in Welsh poetry of the following century. Following his example, by the last years of the 19th century poets who would become the significant voices of the first part of the 20th such as T. Gwynn Jones (1871–1948) sought to both simplify and improve the quality of Eisteddfod poetry, which they perceived had become formulaic and stilted.

=== Prose ===
The vitality of the Welsh-language press meant the 19th century was a golden era for Welsh prose in Welsh in terms of quantity, if not necessarily quality. A significant amount of the prose published in Welsh during the period served primarily religious purposes: published sermons, biblical commentaries and the biographies and autobiographies of important ministers and preachers were all popular. Some more literary works such as Y Bardd (1830) by the poet Cawrdaf (1795–1848) blended religious and literary elements in a similar way to the prose works of the eighteenth century. Although its spread was slow in the first third of the century, the publication of more secularly-oriented prose works would gather pace and by the end of the century hundreds of novels and short stories had been published in Welsh, though even works intended firstly to entertain often contained religious morals.

==== Novels ====
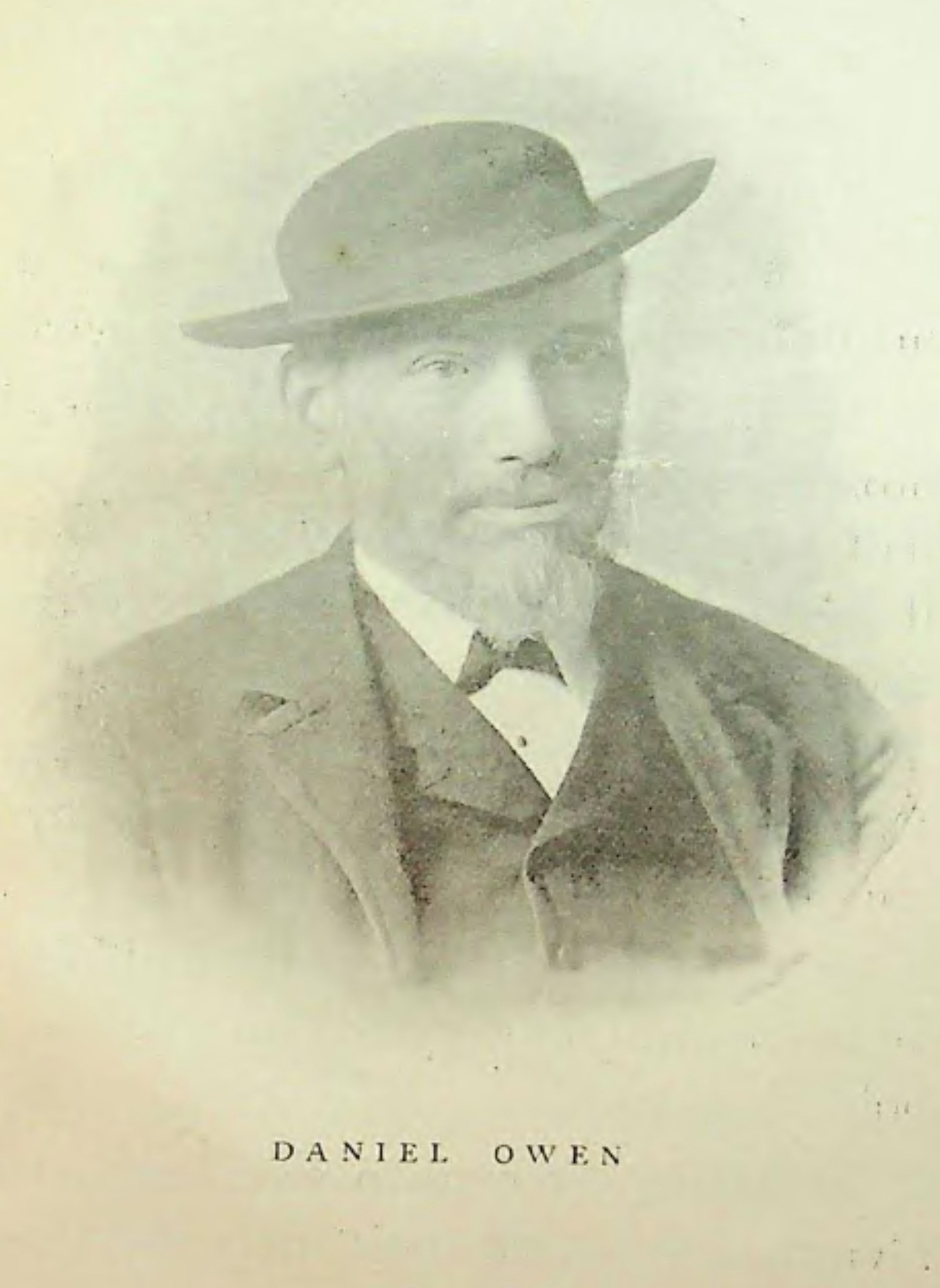
Daniel Owen (1836–1895)

The first magazine serial stories in Welsh had begun appearing in periodicals by the 1820s, though translations of works such as Robinson Crusoe had appeared earlier. The novel in Welsh was somewhat slow to develop, however, due in part to the continued emphasis on poetry in Welsh literary circles but also an ambivalence towards the novel on the part of the nonconformist chapels, which had solidified their dominance on Welsh-language culture over the course of the century. If allegories like Y Bardd are excluded it was not until the which middle of the century that the first novels appeared in book form such as Gwilym Hiraethog's (1802–1883) Aelwyd F'Ewythr Robert (1852), which incorporates a translation of Harriet Beecher Stowe's novel Uncle Tom's Cabin, and Llewelyn Parri (1855) by Llew Llwyfo (1831–1901).

By the 1870s novels both original and translated were being regularly published as serials in a number of publications in the Welsh-language press, and occasionally as books. Competitions for the composition of novels became an occasional feature of Eisteddfodau, though there would not be an annual competition with fixed rules until the establishment of Gwobr Goffa Daniel Owen in 1978. Prolific 19th century novelists in Welsh included Elis o'r Nant (1841–1912), Beriah Gwynfe Evans (1848–1927) and Mary Oliver Jones (1858–1893). Popular subjects for Welsh novels included temperance and social justice, but equally popular was Welsh history, particularly the Welsh princes, such as Elis o'r Nant's Gruffydd ap Cynan and Evans's Bronwen, one of at least four novels written in Welsh in the 19th century to take as their subject Owain Glyndŵr. However, the first novelist in the Welsh language to achieve genuine lasting popularity was Daniel Owen (1836–1895), author of Rhys Lewis (1885) and Enoc Huws (1891), among others. A tailor from Mold, Owen's novels have been widely praised for qualities which are often deemed lacking in those of his contemporaries: accessible and natural language, especially dialogue; memorable characters; psychological insight and satirical humour. They proved phenomenally popular in his own lifetime and though sometimes criticised for a lack of structure they have remained popular ever since, going through multiple reprints during the 20th and 21st centuries as well as being adapted for stage and television. Owen's achievement went some way towards legitimising the Welsh-language novel and by the end of the century a new generation of novelists such as William Llewelyn Williams (1867–1922), Winnie Parry (1870–1953) and T. Gwynn Jones (1871–1949) were evidence of a well-established tradition of novel-writing in Welsh, though not until well into the 20th century would any Welsh novelist approach Daniel Owen's popularity with either audiences or critics.

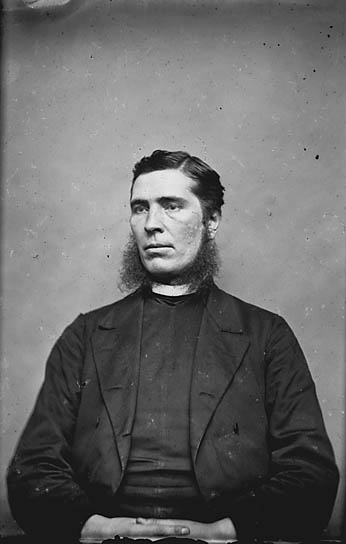
Glasynys (1828–1870)

==== Short stories ====
Short prose stories had appeared in Welsh periodicals as far back as the 18th century and by the end of the 19th they were extremely common, though it has been argued that only very few before the 20th century can be considered examples of the literary short story, with the vast majority being examples more of folk literature or tall tales. An early example are the stories of Glasynys (1828–1870) which appeared in the compendium Cymru Fu ("Wales that Was") edited by Isaac Foulkes (1836–1904). Glasynys's stories draw on extensively on Welsh folklore though they draw as much on his own invention. Novelist Daniel Owen (see above) was also the author of Straeon y Pentan ("Fireside Tales") which was the first dedicated collection of Welsh short stories to be published in book form. The stories in the collection, which Owen claimed to be "true every word," appear to be at least partly based on material Owen collected from local oral tradition.

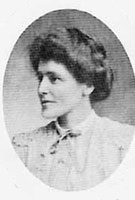
Eluned Morgan (1870–1938)

==== Essays and other forms ====
Thanks to the explosion in readership and publications Welsh readers could draw from an enormous range of original creative writing concerning various subjects. While religious subjects remained the most prominent by some distance, particularly by the end of the century there were examples of political writing by the likes of R. J. Derfel and Cranogwen (see above) as well as Emrys ap Iwan, but also genres like travel writing in Welsh, such as Cranogwen's account of her visits to England and the United States of America, and the descriptions of the Andes by Eluned Morgan (1870–1938), perhaps the most significant Welsh writer to emerge from the Welsh-speaking community in Patagonia. Morgan's depictions appeared in the periodical Cymru as did many poems, stories and novels by individuals mentioned above. Cymru's editor O. M. Edwards (1858–1920) was himself a major early travel writer in Welsh with books such as O'r Bala i Geneva (1899). Cymru was enormously influential in promoting Welsh literature and history broadly; Edwards personally contributed a significant number of accessible articles on Welsh history to the journal. He was a central figure in the Liberal tradition which dominated Welsh political life during the 19th century; however, the 19th century also saw the emergence of a native, nationalist political tradition, most notably in the writing of Emrys ap Iwan (1848–1906), perhaps the first original political philosopher whose primary language of expression was Welsh.

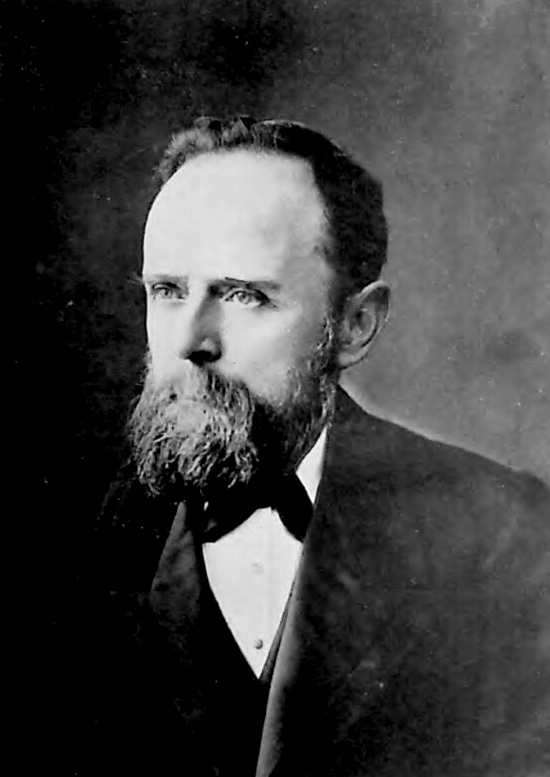
Beriah Gwynfe Evans (1848–1926), novelist and "father of the Welsh-language drama".

=== Stage works ===
Although a handful of Anterliwtiau survive from the first years of the 19th century, and some 18th century Anterliwtiau would be republished in the 19th, the form had disappeared as a performance art by the death of Twm o'r Nant in 1811. When Welsh-language drama re-emerged in the second half of the century it was effectively a new tradition rather than one which had any continuity with the Anterliwt. The Theatres Act 1843 had relaxed legal restrictions on public performance and English-language theatre consequently became established, leading to a new interest in a secular Welsh-language theatre. Theatrical performances had become an occasional feature of Eisteddfodau by the last third of the century. Drama remained a small part of the century's literary output in Welsh, however. The key practitioners in the field were poets such as R. J. Derfel (1824–1905), whose verse play Brad y Llyfrau Gleision (1854), depicting the Treachery of the Blue Books was a part of the literary response to that event; and journalist/novelist Beriah Gwynfe Evans (1848–1927), sometimes described as the "father of the Welsh-language drama". His dramas, such as Owain Glyndŵr (1880) and the "drama-cantata" Llewelyn ein Llyw Olaf (1883) drew on Welsh history (as did many of Evans's novels). Llewelyn ein Llyw Olaf was written to music by composer Alaw Ddu (1838–1904), and the period saw many settings of words in Welsh to musical performances, such as the first opera in Welsh, Blodwen (1878) by Joseph Parry (1841–1903), the libretto to which had been written by Mynyddog (1833–1877). These works, whether dramatic or operatic, were all written in stylised verse; by the end of the century, however, stage adaptations of the novels of Daniel Owen (see above) by John Morgan Edwards (1868–1924) among others pointed the way to a more naturalistic style of dramatic writing and performance.

== 1900–1950 ==
If the 19th century had been a century of change, then this only accelerated in the 20th. By now Welsh was for the first time a minority language in Wales, with the 1901 census being the last to show Welsh as the language of over half the population. This decline would accelerate during the first half of the century before stabilising in the final decades. With most migration to Wales having taken place before the First World War, the continued decline during the 20th century represented language shift within families and the low social status of Welsh. Another aspect of this cultural shift was the emergence of Welsh writing in English as a significant tradition in its own right for the first time, which some Welsh writers perceived as either an irrelevance or a threat to their own legitimacy.

Despite (or even because) of this unpromising context for the language, there is a widespread recognition that Welsh-language literature thrived during the 20th century. This can be attributed in part to a growing academic professionalism on the part of Welsh writers, in response to developments like the establishment of the University of Wales, which began teaching university courses in Welsh literature. Although these were initially antiquarian in focus and taught exclusively in English, this had changed by the middle of the century, with the universities effectively supplanting the role of the old Welsh societies and the Hen Bersoniaid which had maintained Welsh scholarship in the previous two centuries. Increasing access to literature as well as radio and the democratisation of travel enabled Welsh writers of the 20th century to tap into European literature and art in a way that few of the predecessors had been able.

As the 20th century wore on, literature in Welsh was increasingly being produced in response to, or at least in the awareness of, the climate of crisis and of a changing Welsh identity, and though this was less apparent in the first part of the century, a very significant number of major literary figures in 20th century Welsh literature (though by no means all) were directly involved to some degree with Plaid Cymru and the campaign for Welsh independence. Among the literary figures who were prominent in Plaid Cymru – either involved in its founding, standing as candidates, and/or occupying administrative roles within the party – were W. J. Gruffydd (1881–1954), D. J. Williams (1885–1970), Prosser Rhys (1889–1967), Kate Roberts (1891–1985), Saunders Lewis (1893–1985), Ambrose Bebb (1894–1955), James Kitchener Davies (1904–1952), Pennar Davies (1911–1996) and Islwyn Ffowc Elis (1924–2004), among many others who were members or active to other degrees. Writers also responded in various ways to the wider political and historical developments of the period through which they were living, such as the rise of fascism and socialism, and the two World Wars. Particular of note in the latter regard is the number of Welsh literary figures who served as conscientious objectors during the First (such as T. H. Parry-Williams and D. Gwenallt Jones) and particularly the Second World War (Euros and Geraint Bowen, Islwyn Ffowc Elis, Rhydwen Williams and Waldo Williams), though many also saw action.

Whilst some of the institutions which had sustained the language in the 19th century – the chapels and the press – saw significant declines in the 20th, where Welsh-language publishing continued it was more professional than in the past. The Eisteddfod (at least at national level) maintained its significance and in fact became more self-consciously Welsh, being seen not just as a celebration of Welsh-language culture but a bastion to protect the language itself, with a rule being passed in 1950 which brought the use of English in Eisteddfod competitions and speeches – which had previously been commonplace – to an end.

=== The 20th-century literary revival ===
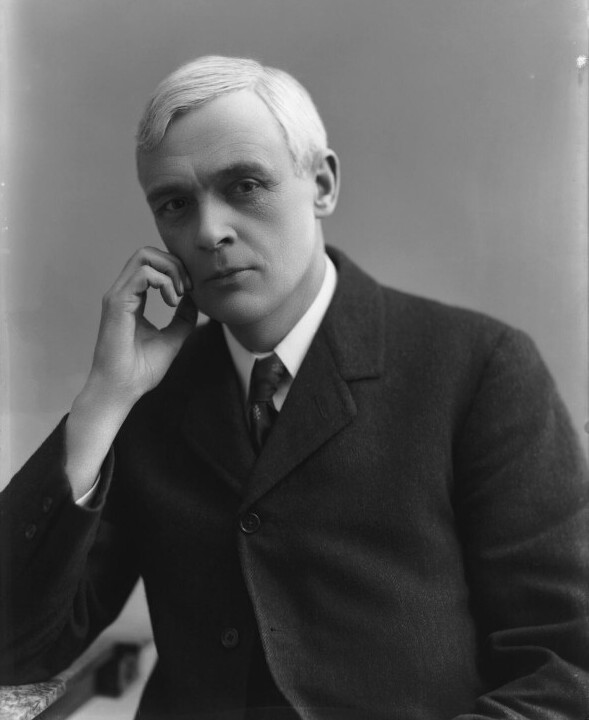
O. M. Edwards (1858–1920)

The first years of the 20th century are frequently regarded as representing a "revival" or even a "renaissance" in Welsh poetry; and once again a period in Welsh literature in which a perception that standards had declined was addressed by reaching back into the literary tradition of the past as a source of renewal and reinvigoration. The reaction against the late 19th century Bardd Newydd ("New Poet"; see above) had already begun by the final years of that century (see above), but the first two key figures in the 20th-century literary revival would make their mark not as poets in their own right but as what R. M. Jones referred to as "literary politicians": using their influence to create the conditions necessary for the revival. The first of these was journalist, historian and politician O. M. Edwards (1858–1920). He would make a mark in his own right as a writer of popular history books and travel writing (see below), but made his main impact as an enabler of others, particularly through his editorship from 1890 onwards of the influential magazine Cymru, in which some of the poetry and other literature of the revival appeared alongside accessible articles on Welsh history, politics and a range of other subjects. Edwards would also publish an affordable series of literary classics in Welsh, Cyfres y Fil, making the poetic tradition accessible to ordinary readers in a way it had not been before. Edwards included not just established canonical figures such as Dafydd ap Gwilym and Goronwy Owen in the series, but also poets of the 19th century like Eben Fardd, Islwyn and others. Writing in the Dictionary of Welsh Biography, historian R. T. Jenkins would say of him:

His service to Wales in these respects cannot be over-estimated; it was a service rendered at a critical time in the history of Welsh culture... He nourished a school of young writers, and it would be easy to give a long list of prominent Welsh literati who began their careers under his aegis.

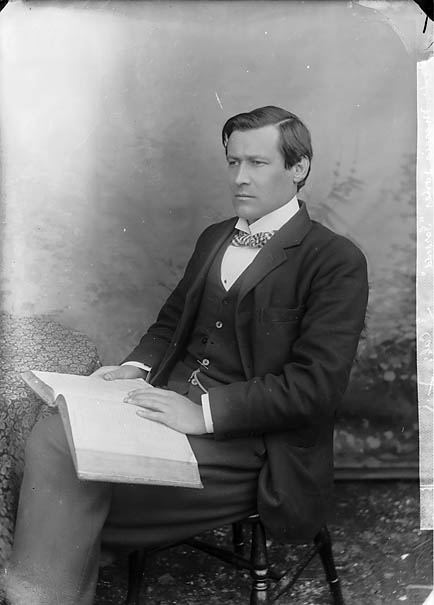
John Morris-Jones (1864–1929)

A fellow student of Edwards's at Oxford was John Morris-Jones (1864–1929). A poet in his own right in the last years of the previous century (see above) as well as a translator of Heine and Omar Khayyam, it is in his capacity as an academic and critic that he would become a central figure in the 20th century literary revival. After completing his studies under John Rhys at Oxford, Morris-Jones would become the first lecturer in Welsh at the fledgling University of Wales and would teach many writers of the next generation. Morris-Jones would go on to standardise Welsh grammar and spelling, and later in life would also produce a book Cerdd Dafod (1925) in which he set out the rules of the strict metres; it remains an authoritative text on the subject. A stickler for academic standards who was entirely unafraid of causing offence, in a series of articles in O. M. Edwards's Cymru he would expose the inauthenticity of the Gorsedd, causing a scandal and beginning a wider conflict between the fledgling University (and Morris-Jones specifically) and the old Eisteddfod establishment which would also encompass poetic standards. Its credibility declining, the Eisteddfod invited Morris-Jones to adjudicate the Chair even though he had never won the award himself: he would regularly serve as chief adjudicator throughout the first quarter of the 20th century, finally banishing the (never-realised) obsession with a Miltonian epic and helping to usher in a new set of literary values: clarity, brevity, high linguistic standards, and an understanding of the literary tradition. The major poets associated with the 20th-century revival – T. Gwynn Jones (1871–1949), W. J. Gruffydd (1881–1954), R. Williams Parry (1884–1956) and T. H. Parry-Williams (1887–1975) – undoubtedly all individually eclipsed Morris-Jones as poets, and in fact would all ultimately move beyond Morris-Jones's rather narrow poetic conception. Nevertheless, their achievements would have been difficult or even impossible without the influence of John Morris-Jones.

==== The revival poets ====
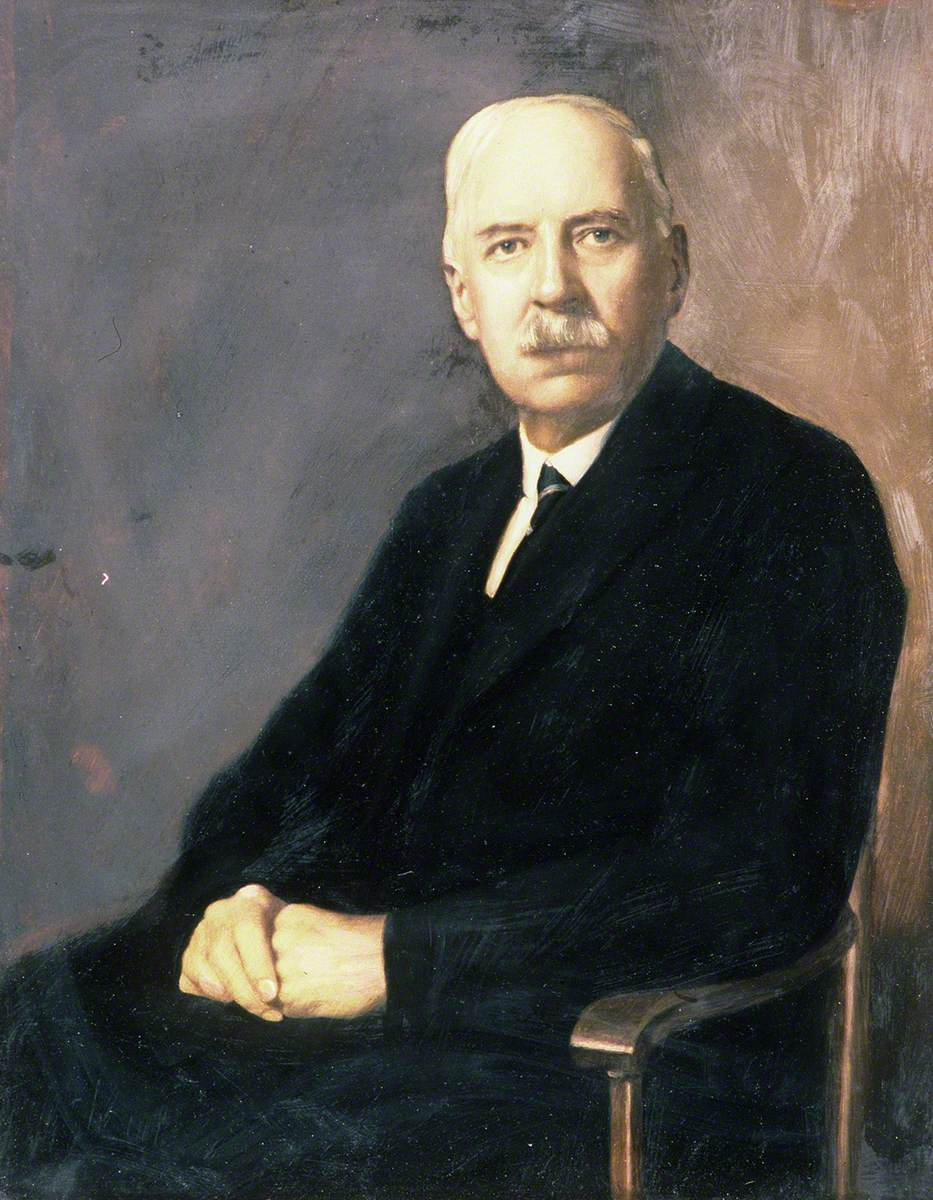
Portrait of T. Gwynn Jones, a leading figure in the early 20th-century literary revival, c. 1930

The winning of the Chair by T. Gwynn Jones (1871–1949) in 1902 for his awdl Ymadawiad Arthur – with Morris-Jones the lead adjudicator – was widely seen as a watershed moment in the new literary revival and at least one critical study of 20th century Welsh literature begins its field of study in 1902, not 1900 for this reason. Widely recognised as a "masterpiece" (in its final 1934 revision at least), the poem, which reconciled the European romantic traditions of King Arthur with the Mabinogion, was one of the shortest awdlau to win the chair at the time and was later perceived to have reinvigorated cynghanedd and the wider Eisteddfod tradition. It would cement the reputation of T. Gwynn Jones as the first major poet of the new movement. A journalist and the son of tenant farmers, Jones had already established a name during the 1890s as a novelist and as a political poet and satirist with works like Gwlad y Gân (see above); he had always harboured serious poetic and academic ambitions, however. He would eventually become a professor at Aberystwyth and a major figure of his age in Welsh scholarship. A phenomenally productive author whose bibliography has thousands of entries in a wide range of genres, he made significant contributions in the novel, short story and drama, and even travel writing, as well as being a translator into Welsh of major European works such as Goethe's Faust, Victor Hugo's The Man Who Laughs, Ibsen's Ghosts and Shakespeare's Macbeth, and even an abridged Welsh retelling of War and Peace. Despite all this activity, however, it was poetry that he held in the highest regard, and for which he would be best remembered. A poet of "genius", he is considered one of the major practitioners of cynghanedd in Welsh and his output in the strict meters includes alongside 'Ymadawiad Arthur' numerous other long narrative poems drawing on Welsh mythology such as 'Madog' (1918), 'Broseliàwnd' (1922) and 'Anatiomaros' (1925). It was perhaps in 'Madog' that Gwynn reached his full maturity, at least in this kind of narrative poem; Alan Llwyd described the work as having "[solved] the problem of the Welsh epic." 'Despite this acute indebtedness to centuries of literary tradition, Jones was an innovator who experimented with cynghanedd in a way no previous poet had done, for example writing sonnets in cynghanedd and inventing his own meters such as in 'Madog'. Although most of his best-known works are in the strict metres his lyrical poetry in the free metres matches that of his contemporaries and he is widely acknowledged as one of the finest poets in the language of any period, Jones remained characteristically modest about his own achievements, scuppering an attempt to put his name forward for a Nobel Prize by refusing to accept the nomination.

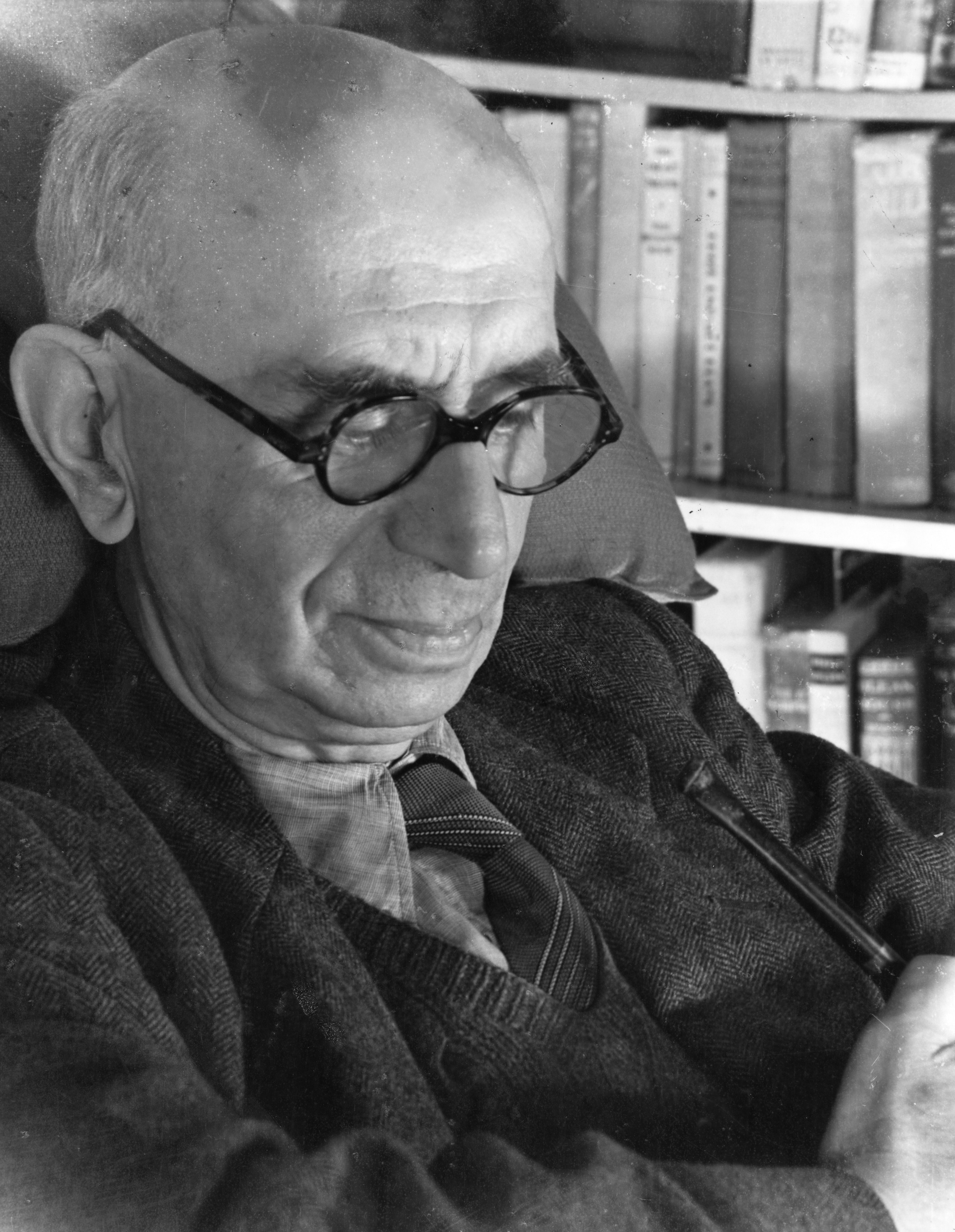
W. J. Gruffydd (1871–1954), academic and poet of the 20th-century revival.

As a young man T. Gwynn Jones had been unable to accept a scholarship at Oxford due to illness, but many of the other major figures of the revival, even if they were from working-class backgrounds, were able to benefit from a university education. This was something which would have been available to very few of their predecessors, representing a generational divide between the old Eisteddfod poets and the new school. By the time he left Wales to study at Oxford, quarryman's son W. J. Gruffydd (1871–1954) had become an acquaintance of John Morris-Jones and published his first poems in a collaboration with fellow revival poet R. Silyn Roberts (1871–1930), whose "lyrical pryddest" Trystan ac Esyllt won the Eisteddfod Crown in 1902, the same year as T. Gwynn Jones won the chair. Their collection, Telynegion ('Lyrics'), which drew heavily on the example of Morris-Jones, was heralded at the time as representing a new era in Welsh poetry. Gruffydd would go on to become a major voice in the new kind of lyrical poetry which the revival pursued; in contrast with T. Gwynn Jones this was written entirely in the free meters. Though he composed less and less poetry as the century drew on, he would become one of the most prominent figures in Welsh public life – if not always the most popular – thanks to his literary and academic work, his uncompromising personality as well as a controversial period in politics in his last decades.

Like Gruffydd, many of the major revival poets would ultimately become employed at the Welsh colleges. Whilst Morris-Jones at Bangor had been the first Wales-based professor of Welsh to be employed by the fledgling University of Wales, by the turn of the century there were also departments of Welsh (or at least "Celtic") at Cardiff and Aberystwyth. These would employ Gruffydd at Cardiff from 1906; similarly R. Williams Parry (1884–1956) would end up at Bangor from 1922, and both T. Gwynn Jones and T. H. Parry-Williams (1887–1954) at Aberystwyth from 1914. Other influential early academics, though remembered mainly for their scholarship rather than as poets, were Ifor Williams (1881–1965) and Thomas Parry (1904–1985). Figures such as these and others made significant strides in the undoing of the mistakes (and forgeries) of the previous two centuries of antiquarianism. Gruffydd in particular was influential in demanding full academic status for the Welsh language, and it was under his leadership that the Welsh department at Cardiff would be the first to be referred to as such (rather than as a department of 'Celtic'), and the first to conduct all its teaching and internal administration in Welsh.

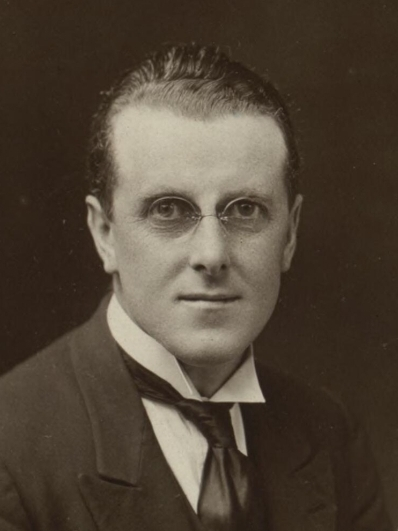
R. Williams Parry (1884–1956), academic and poet of the 20th-century revival.

In 1909 the Chair and Crown had been won by T. Gwynn Jones (again) and Gruffydd respectively, and the following year the Chair was won by another major poet associated with the 20th-century revival, R. Williams Parry (1884–1956). His victorious poem, Yr Haf ('Summer'), has remained one of the most popular of all the Eisteddfod awdlau. A Romantic allegory about the transience of love, it shows the influence of Omar Khayyam (whose poetry had appeared in a Welsh translation by Morris-Jones in 1907). It earned its author the reputation as the only living practitioner of cynghanedd to rival T. Gwynn Jones and is considered one of the great awdlau of the 20th century. Williams Parry became equally well known, however, as a writer of lyrical poems in the free metres, especially sonnets (a form which became very popular in Welsh during the first half of the century) such as Y Llwynog ('The Fox') and Mae Hiraeth yn y Môr ('There is Hiraeth in the Sea'). He remains an extremely popular poet for his "acute observation, his independent outlook and his meticulous attention to the mode of expression created a body of poetry which has its own special features and is a unique contribution to Welsh literature." A change in attitude that can be seen in the literary careers of these revival poets and which was explicitly acknowledged by R. Williams Parry was that they saw Eisteddfod success not as the highest literary achievement for a Welsh poet (as their predecessors had done), but as a means for a poet at the start of his career to achieve recognition and constructive feedback, with the expectation that, having won the award(s), he would then move on to produce work of greater literary worth than allowed by the constraints of competition.

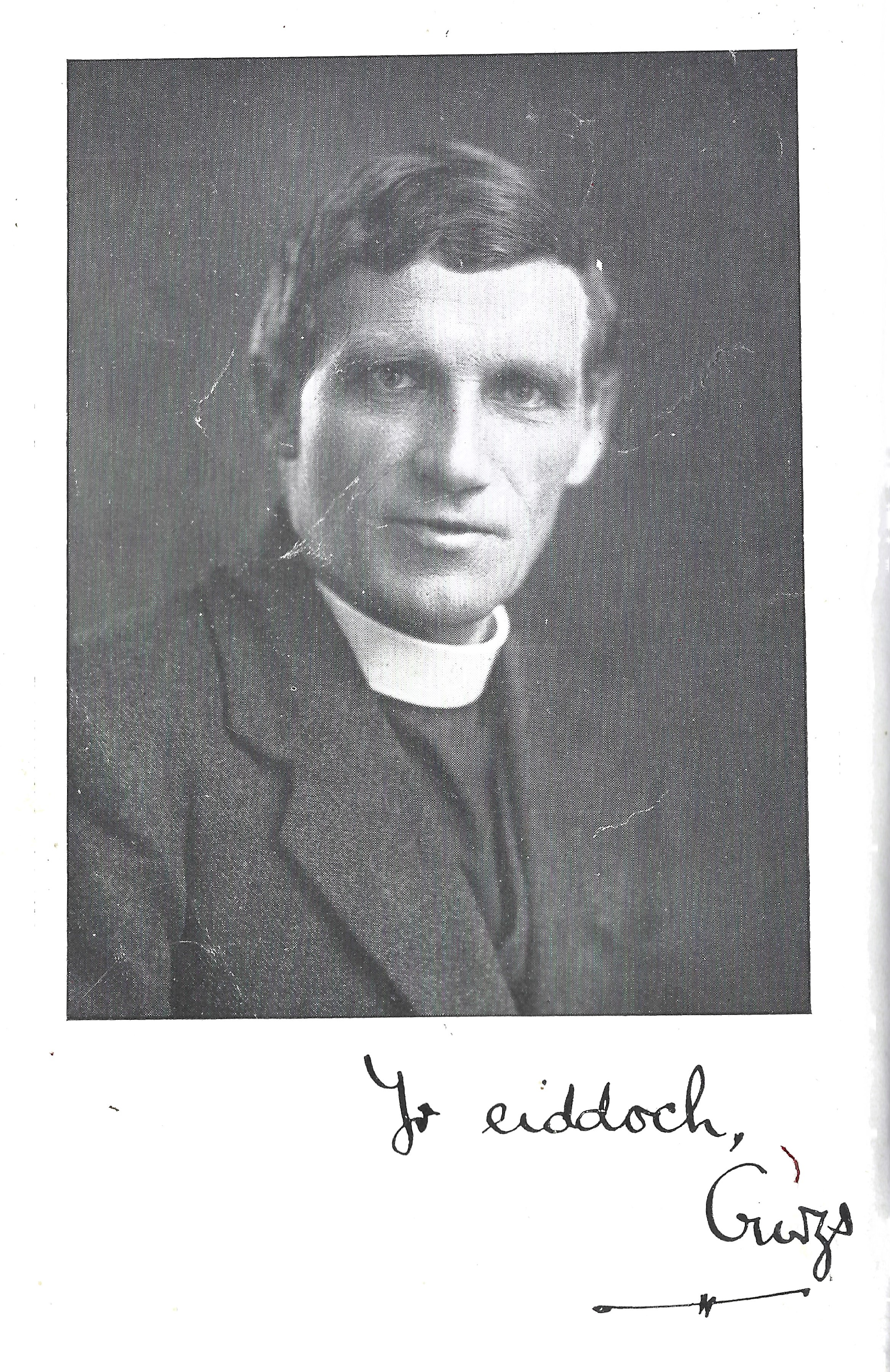
Crwys, one of the most popular Welsh poets of the first half of the 20th century. (1875–1968)

==== Other figures ====
By beginning of the First World War, it was possible to speak of a growing number of now prominent poets who had assimilated the influence of John Morris-Jones. Among these names, Eifion Wyn (1867–1926) was the only one (besides T. Gwyn Jones and Morris-Jones himself) who had achieved any kind of prominence in the previous century; he would be one of the most popular poets of the first decades of the century though he would not achieve the lasting critical reputation of the younger generation. Among the other names associated with the literary revival worthy of mention are J. J. Williams (1869–1954), R. Silyn Roberts (1871–1930), John Dyfnallt Owen (1873–1956) and Crwys (1875–1968; winner of the Crown in 1910, 1911 and 1919); these poets had a range of backgrounds and whilst the names most prominently associated with the revival had come from North Wales, many of these were from the South. Though he had been born in Ceredigion J. J. Williams had grown up in the valleys and worked as a miner; he would win the chair in 1906 and 1808, the first for Y Lloer ('The Moon'), a love poem which would prove one of the more popular awdlau of the period. He would go on to be a popular poet for children, edit the poetry of Hedd Wyn (see below) and serve as archdruid. R. Silyn Roberts had won the Crown in 1902 and was a key early figure in the revival but would write little after publishing a book of his poetry in 1907, turning from poetry to politics and education. J. Dyfnallt Owen from Pontardawe was the winner of the Crown in 1907 for Y Greal Sanctaidd ('The Holy Grail') and another poet who would go on to serve as archdruid, as would Crwys, from Clydach, who would prove one of the most popular poets of the 20th century as a writer of accessible, lyrical poems.

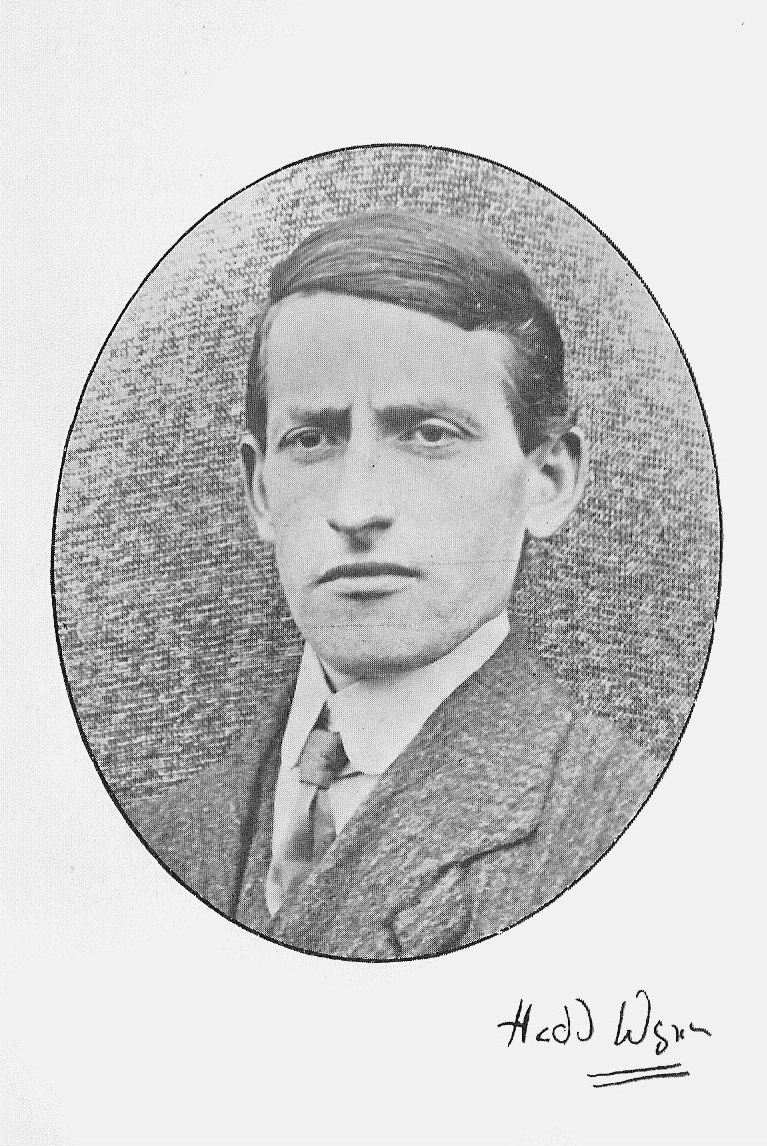
Hedd Wyn (1887–1917)

One of the last poets to emerge in the romantic tradition o of the revival was a shepherd from Trawsfynydd who would go on to become one of the most famous of all Welsh poets, albeit for tragic reasons. Hedd Wyn (Ellis Humphrey Evans; 1887–1917) was a gifted poet in the romantic mode of the 20th-century revival. A promising literary career beckoned, however, like many young men of his generation he was enlisted during the First World War. Shortly after submitting his awdl on Yr Arwr (The Hero) – not a romanticisation of the conflict, but a complex, mystical meditation on the role of the artist – for the 1917 Eisteddfod, he was killed in the Battle of Passchendaele. His poem having been judged best (by T. Gwynn Jones), during the ceremony Hedd Wyn's chair was draped in a black cloth.

=== Testing boundaries: Poetry 1910–1940 ===
However much it represented a reaction against the literary traditions of the previous century, the poetic revival of the early 20th century, as expressed in the poetry of all the aforementioned figures in the period, was fundamentally Romantic in its aesthetic in the same way as much of the literature of the 19th century had been. By the second decade of the century, however, and particularly after the war, poets were increasingly transgressing the expectations of romanticism and beginning to take the first steps into modernism or at least post-romanticism. In this context it is possible to see Hedd Wyn's awdl of 1917 as something of a swan song for Welsh Romanticism; it has been described by Alan Llwyd as "the last great poem of the Romantic movement".

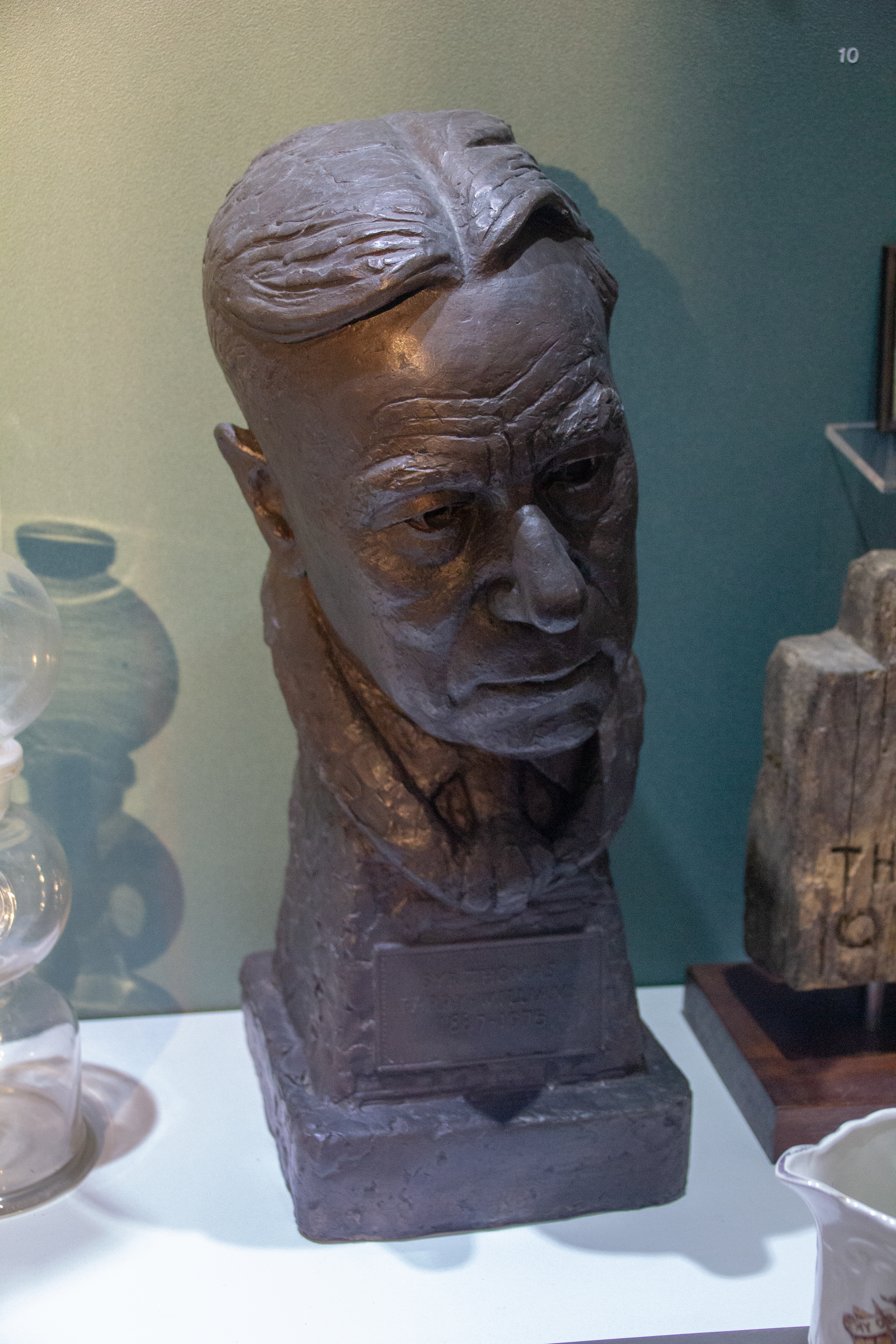
Bust of T. H. Parry-Williams (1887–1975)

The first poet to achieve prominence in a more obviously modernist idiom was T. H. Parry-Williams (1887–1975), who capped his remarkable achievement in becoming the first poet to win both chair and crown in the same year, in 1912, by repeating the feat a second time in 1915. His earlier poems including those awarded in 1912 show the strong influence of R. Silyn Roberts and W. J. Gruffydd and would have established him as another major figure in the Romantic vein of the other revival poets, but of much greater significance was the poem which won him the Crown in 1915. The previous year's Eisteddfod had been cancelled due to the war, and consequently and unusually no subject was set for the Crown in 1915, with poets allowed to write on the subject of their choice, so as to allow poems prepared for the previous year's competition to be entered alongside newly composed poems. This would prove significant as Parry-Williams's choice of subject was one unlikely to have been set at the time: Y Ddinas ('The City'). A portrait of Paris, where he had spent time in 1913, and a cynical exploration of the corrupting nature of urban environments on the human condition, it is acknowledged as one of the first significant explorations of urban life and the earliest expressions of modernism in Welsh poetry. It proved controversial, earning the condemnation of arch-romantic Eifion Wyn. It was for his later work on a smaller canvas, however, that T. H. Parry-Williams would become celebrated, and in his shorter poetry, mostly written in the 1920s–1930s, he can be seen ranging far beyond the limits set by John Morris-Jones. Poems like Hon ('This'), Moelni ('Bareness') and Llyn y Gadair (A lake in the poet's native Eifionydd), many of them sonnets (of which Parry-Williams was a master), often exhibit an unromantic affection for his home expressed through ironic detachment and frustration. One of his most remarkable poems, the sonnet Dychwelyd ('Return'), is a bleak expression of nihilism and materialism. Described as the "most influential Welsh writer of the inter-war period", Parry-Williams also pioneered the expressive essay in Welsh. Parry-Williams's poetry is a mainstay of school and university syllabuses, and he remains one of Wales's best loved poets; even during his own lifetime he was widely recognised among the most important poets writing in Welsh and he would be a continuing influence on poets of the late 20th century, and even the twenty-first.

He was not the only Welsh poet to move away from Romanticism, however. Whilst Parry-Williams had been a conscientious objector during the war, W. J. Gruffydd had spent it at sea on a minesweeper and the handful of poems he produced in response to the conflict track his progression to a sparser, more ambiguous style. His cynical 1914–1918: Yr Ieuainc wrth yr Hen ('The Young to the Old'), which parodies For the Fallen, depicts a youth condemning, from the grave, the older generation who had sent them to their deaths. In the introduction to the first volume of poetry he published after the war, Ynys yr Hud a Cherddi Eraill, Gruffydd dismissed most of his earlier work as frivolous and/or juvenilia (despite including many such earlier poems in the volume). T. Gwynn Jones had been deemed of too poor health to serve in the war but it coincided with a shift towards a darker style in his writing, as seen in Madog (1918), and the poetry he published in his final collection Y Dwymyn (The Fever; written around 1935–36) is strikingly modern, particularly when compared to the poetry for which he had become famous.

Younger poets also began pushing boundaries. Cynan (1895–1970) came to prominence initially for poetry describing his experiences as a soldier during the First World War, including Mab y Bwthyn, the pryddest which won him the 1921 Crown; he is perhaps the Welsh poet who responded most extensively and effectively to his experiences as a soldier, but was a poet who believed anything could be material for poetry, writing about things as diverse as rugby. He courted controversy with form also: the poem that won him the Chair in 1923, I'r Duw nid adwaenir (To the unfamiliar God), was notable as, though in cynghanedd, it had not been written in the acknowledged twenty-four metres of Welsh strict metre poetry but rather in the form T. Gwynn Jones had invented for Madog. The Crown saw even more marked experimentation: the poem with which Wil Ifan (1883–1968) won the award in 1925 was the first time the competition had been won by a poem written in vers libre.

A different kind of controversy took place during the same competition the preceding year, when Prosser Rhys (1901–1945) won on the subject Atgof ("Memory") with a poem that caused a scandal due to its frank (for the time) depictions of sexual intercourse, including sex between men. Another poet whose depictions of sexuality caused controversy, and one of the major poets in Welsh to emerge between the wars, was Gwenallt (1899–1968). He won the Chair in 1926 and 1931, but his entry in 1928 on Y Sant (The Saint), though "by far the best poem in the competition", shocked the adjudicators for its graphic sexual imagery. The poets of the revival had largely avoided religious subjects (so beloved of the Bardd Newydd): not so Gwenallt, who was "a major force in modern Welsh poetry, and also a major religious poet". Adopting a complex personal philosophy that integrated Christianity with Welsh Nationalism and Marxism, he joined the Church in Wales only to leave in protest and join the Methodists in 1957 when a non-Welsh speaker was appointed Archbishop of Wales. The limits of acceptability were also stretched by yet another young poet, Caradog Prichard (1904–1980), who won three consecutive National Crowns from 1927 to 1929 – an unprecedented feat, never since repeated – for poems each of which dealt in different ways with the same, autobiographical subject: his mother's descent into mental illness and institutionalisation in an asylum.

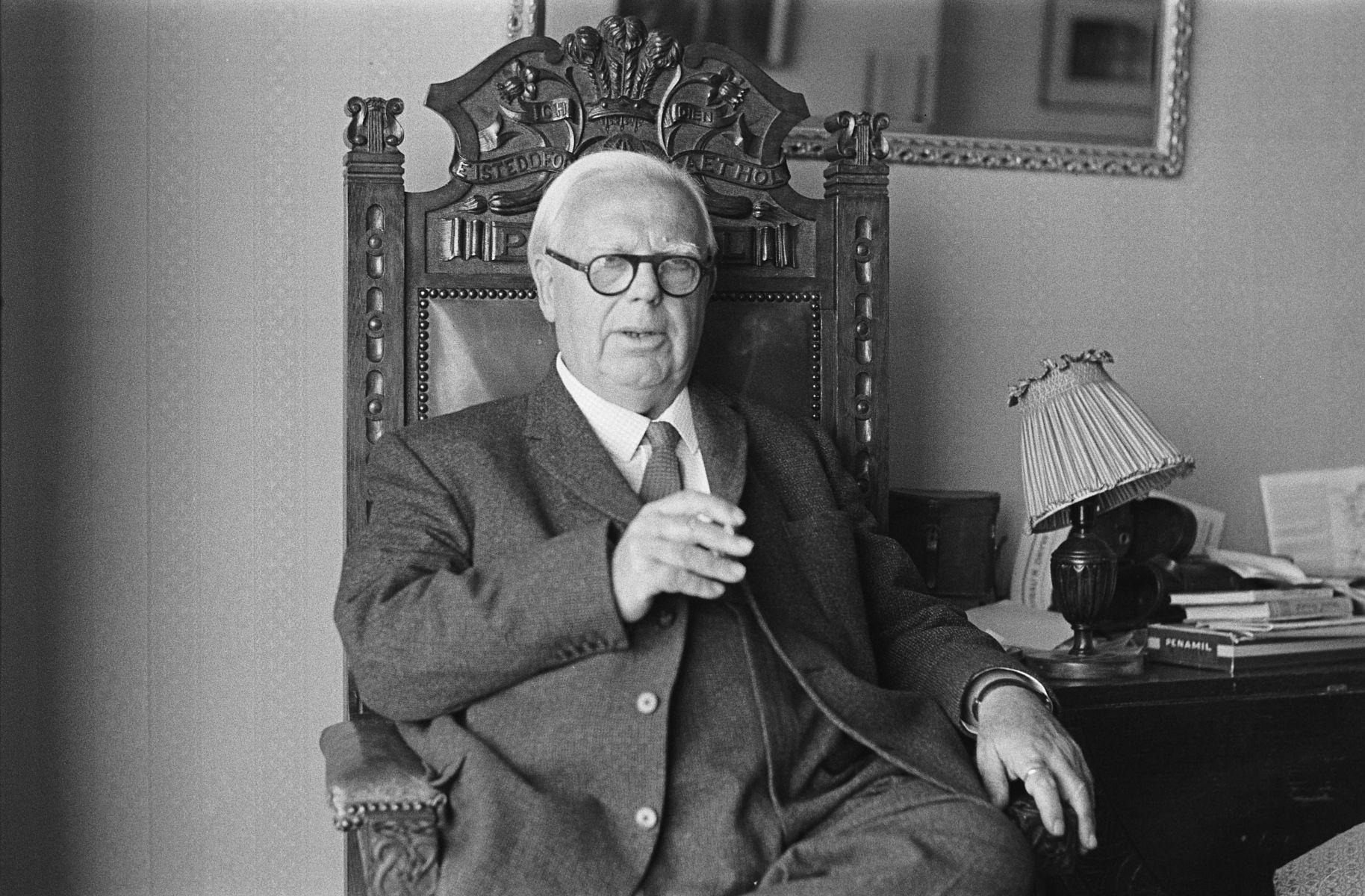
Cynan (1895–1970), poet, dramatist and archdruid, depicted towards the end of his life, seated in a bardic chair.

These overt experiments remained somewhat outside the mainstream of Welsh poetry, however, and much of the work of poets named above like Cynan and Wil Ifan, alongside others such as Sarnicol (1873–1945), Crwys (1875–1968), I. D. Hooson (1880–1948), Dewi Emrys (1881–1952) and Iorwerth Peate (1901–1982) was less controversial stylistically. The work of these poets is often described (sometimes pejoratively) in criticism as "Georgian": they were regularly-anthologised poets wrote accessible, lyrical poetry in an "adamantly unintellectual" style which brought them popularity and often Eisteddfod success, though they have tended to be overlooked by critics in favour of their more innovative contemporaries. The prominence of bardic names in this group is significant: Gwenallt was perhaps the only true innovator in the period to use a bardic name. The revival poets from Morris-Jones onwards had tended to eschew bardic names for their associations with the Eisteddfod tradition, and their brief return among the members of this group suggests a more conciliatory attitude towards the Eisteddfod. Cynan would later serve as Archdruid, and he is likely the single individual who has had the greatest influence on the Eisteddfod in that capacity: he was responsible for reforming and modernising the Eisteddfod and Gorsedd and was the first Archdruid to openly acknowledge the inauthenticity of the pseudo-pagan elements which had had their origins in Iolo Morganwg.

=== Mid-century poetry ===
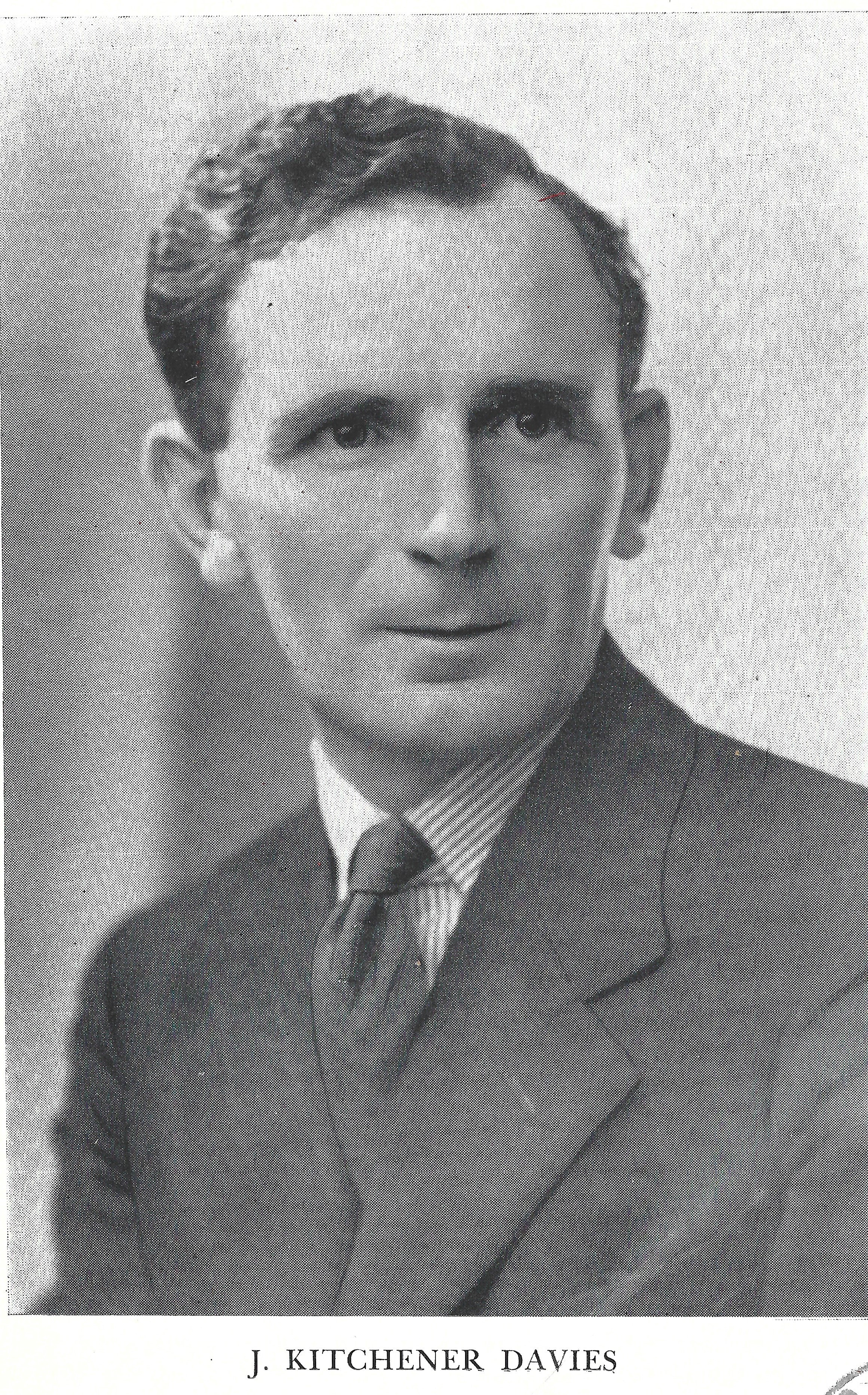
James Kitchener Davies (1902–1952) was a prominent local politician as well as a dramatist and poet.

The flowering in Welsh poetry which had begun with the literary revival at the start of the century continued throughout the 1930s and 1940s. Well-established poets such as T. H. Parry-Williams and Gwenallt (see above) continued to produce important work, and a number of significant new poetic voices emerged during these decades including Saunders Lewis (1893–1985; see section on drama below); Iorwerth Peate (1901–1982), perhaps better known as a museum curator and historian but also one of the proponents of the sonnet in Welsh; Dilys Cadwaladr (1902–1979), who in 1953 became the first woman to win the National Eisteddfod Crown; James Kitchener Davies (1902–1952), whose pryddest for radio Sŵn y Gwynt Sy'n Chwythu ('The Sound of the Blowing Wind'; 1952), narrated by the dying poet to his wife from his hospital bed, has been described as one of the greatest poetic works of the 20th century in Welsh; poet-novelists Pennar Davies (1911–1996) and Rhydwen Williams (1916–1997) (see below); and brothers Euros (1904–1988) (see below) and Geraint Bowen (1915–2011), whose victorious Awdl Foliant i'r Amaethwr ('Ode of Praise to the Agriculturalist') of 1946 has been described as one of the most skilfully constructed poems to win the chair, and is easily the most popular poem of the period to do so. Many of these poets were members of the so-called "Cadwgan Circle" in the Rhondda valley alongside the novelist and short-story writer Käthe Bosse-Griffiths (1910–1998) and her husband J. Gwyn Griffiths (1911–2004).

Another major South Wales poet was Alun Llywelyn-Williams (1913–1988). His upbringing in a middle-class, primarily English-speaking household in Cardiff was far from typical for a Welsh poet of the time and he was in many respects an outsider in Welsh poetry, having seen action in the Second World War (he believed fighting fascism was a moral duty, in contrast to many Welsh poets of his generation who were conscientious objectors) and drawing more on English poets like Auden and Stephen Spender than his Welsh peers (though the revival poets were also a key influence; he studied at Cardiff under W. J. Gruffydd). He eschewed both cynghanedd and Eisteddfod competition. Though not a prolific one, his poems, often provide perspectives rarely seen from other Welsh poets such as those depicting his wartime experiences including his cycle Berlin 1945 which depicts the German capital in ruins after the war from Llywelyn-Williams's first hand perspective. He has been described as "one of the greatest masters of vers libre in Welsh."

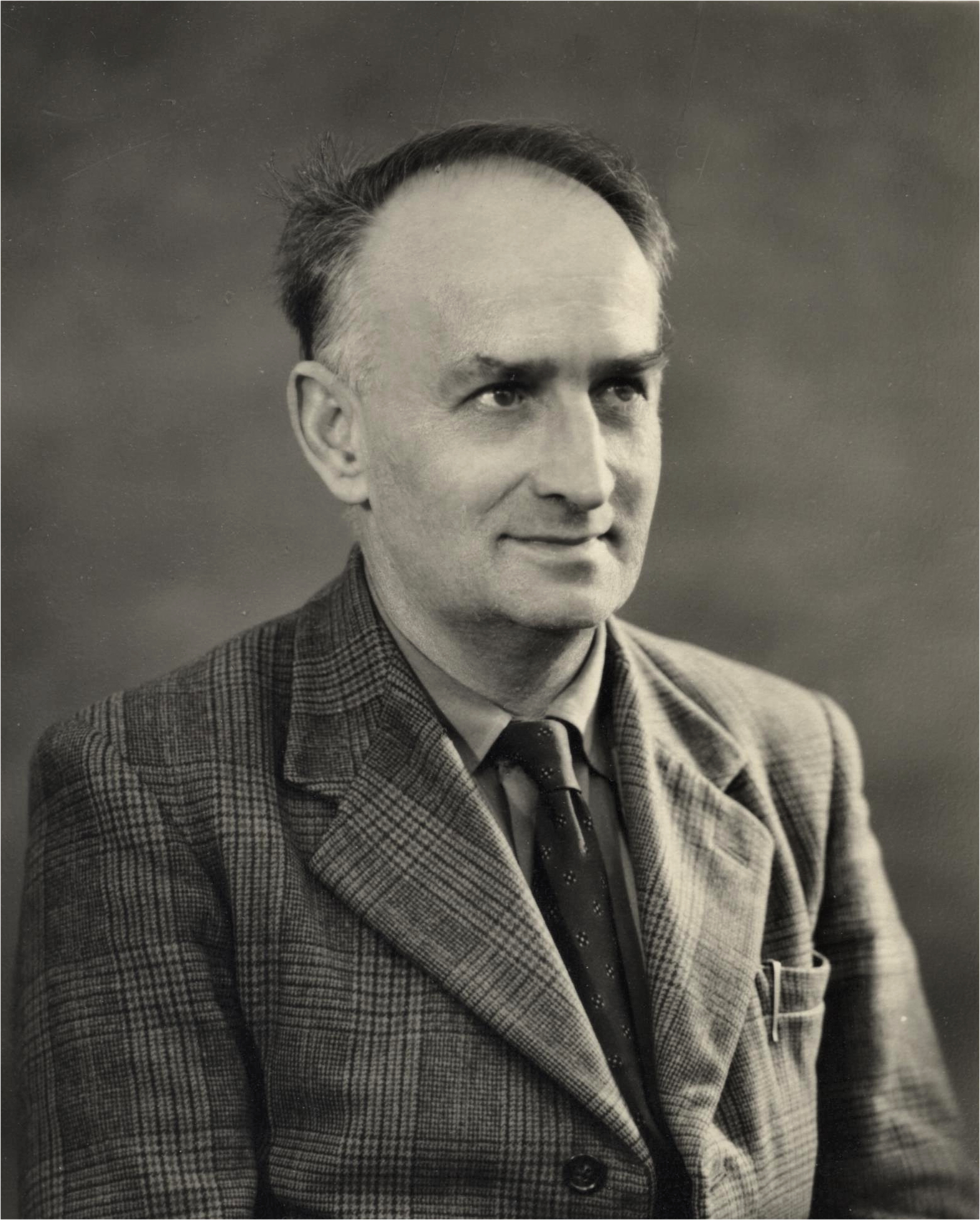
Waldo Williams (1904–1971), one of the best-loved poets in the Welsh language.

One popular poet who emerged at this time would go on to become one of the best-loved of all Welsh poets, Waldo Williams (1904–1971) from Pembrokeshire. Like most Welsh writers he held strong nationalist convictions, but he was also a Quaker whose poetry expresses a distinctive and affecting pacifism and humanism: he was a conscientious objector during the Second World War, and though this was hardly unusual he is perhaps the Welsh poet most strongly associated with this kind of political pacifism. Poems such as "Cofio", "Mewn Dau Gae" and "Ar Waun Cas Mael" have been described as "...some of the most rewarding and challenging poems of the 20th century... He has come to be regarded as a prophet and visionary by those who share his conviction." Despite a somewhat half-hearted attempt at winning an Eisteddfod chair in 1936, for all his popularity and undoubted skill Waldo Williams would never attain a major Eisteddfod prize, and neither did genuine innovators like Saunders Lewis and James Kitchener Davies, during a period when serial competitors such as Dewi Emrys would win several. Some writers once more began to question the relationship between the Eisteddfod and literary standards. The Eisteddfod itself, however, remained as popular as ever, and in 1950 passed a rule known as Y Rheol Gymraeg ('the Welsh Rule', controversial at the time but now widely accepted) dictating that Welsh should be the only language during competition events and performances.

=== Prose 1900–1950 ===
==== Novels and short stories ====
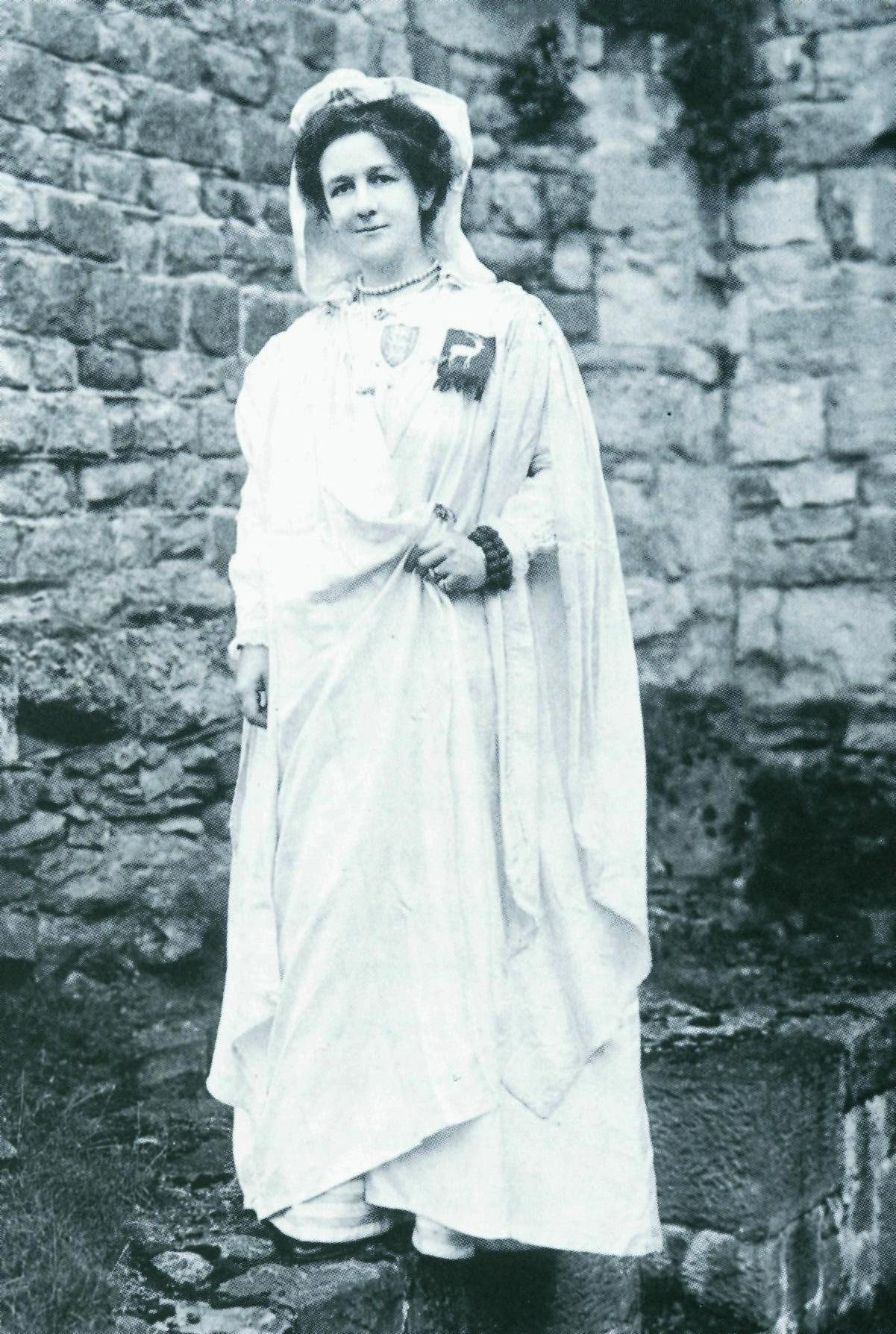
Gwyneth Vaughan (1852–1910), prominent Welsh-language novelist of the 1900s.

Whilst a large number of novelists were active during the early 20th-century literary revival, this period in the Welsh-language novel has remained comparatively less well-known considering the prominence of the poetry of the period. Nonetheless, there were a considerable volume of Welsh novels produced by authors such as T. Gwynn Jones (see above) who published at least ten novels between 1897 and 1910, among them Gorchest Gwilym Bevan (1899) and Enaid Lewys Meredydd: Stori am y Flwyddyn 2002 (Lewys Meredydd's Soul: A Story of the year 2002), the latter one of the earliest examples of science fiction in Welsh. Another novelist was William David Owen, author of Madam Wen (1914), an adventure novel about a 17th-century female pirate. Perhaps the finest novelist in Welsh of the early 20th century was Gwyneth Vaughan (1852–1910), whose works, especially Plant y Gorthrwm ("Children of Oppression"; 1905) – a historical novel taking as its background the 1868 General Election in rural Wales, and the expansion of the franchise – are radical by the standards of their time, with female characters to the fore and exhibiting clear proto-feminist and nationalist themes. Nevertheless, critical discussions of the Welsh novel have tended to give little attention to this period.

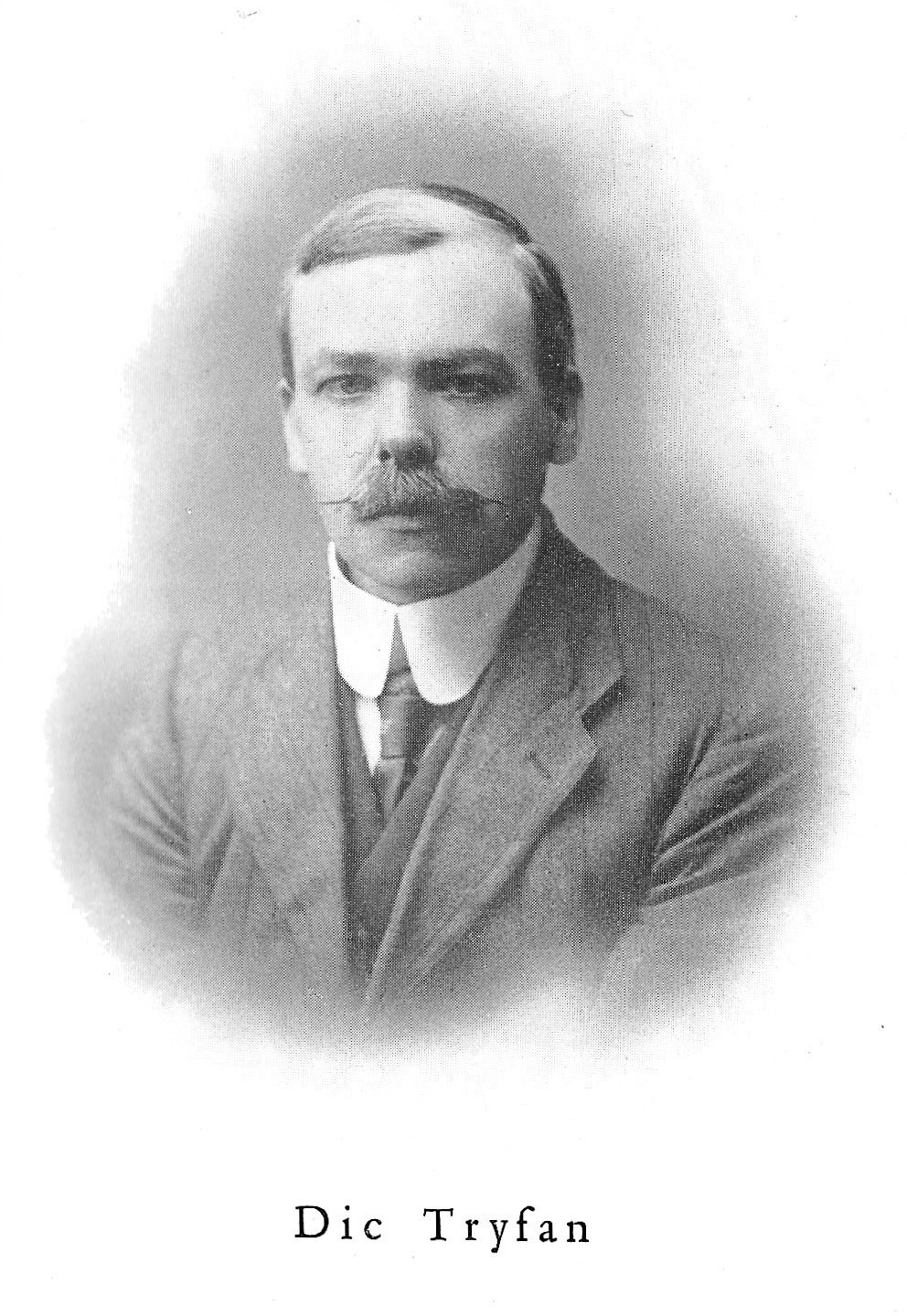
Richard Hughes Williams "Dic Tryfan" (1878–1919), pioneer of the Welsh short story.

The short stories of the period have received more attention, and here yet again T. Gwynn Jones was prominent, though most of his short stories, much as Daniel Owen's had done, belong more to the genre of folk literature and light entertainment than literary short story. This would not be the case with others such as Robert Dewi Williams (1870–1955) whose story Y Clawdd Terfyn (The Boundary; 1912) is an early example, as are the stories of Richard Hughes Williams (1878–1919), which had appeared periodically during the first two decades of the century. Humorous and tragic at turns, Williams's most famous stories are those which explore the lives of the workers of the North Wales slate quarries and though small in number they are celebrated for their subtlety and humour; Williams would exert a significant influence on later short story writers in Welsh.

Modernism caught on more slowly in prose than it had in poetry, and the development of the novel in the Welsh language after the First World War continued to be slow, at least compared with what would come later. The most popular Welsh novel of the 1920s is E. Tegla Davies's Gŵr Pen y Bryn (1923), which though popular is essentially Victorian in its idiom. Davies's main legacy was as a writer for children (see below). By the 1930s Welsh novelists had begun to explore beyond these limits, such as Monica (1930) by Saunders Lewis (1893–1985; see below), which depicts a woman obsessed with sexuality and caused something of a scandal on its publication, and Plasau'r Brenin (1934) by Gwenallt (see above), a semi-autobiographical novel describing the author's experiences in a prison as a conscientious objector during the war. Other authors such as Lewis Davies (1863–1951), author of four adventure novels in the 1920s, and E. Morgan Humphreys (1882–1955) are sometimes described as writing for younger readers but should perhaps better be understood as writers of popular literature intended for a wide audience. As well as a range of early adventure stories, Humphreys pioneered detective fiction in Welsh, with his detective John Aubrey appearing in four novels beginning with Y Llaw Gudd ('The Hidden Hand') in 1924.

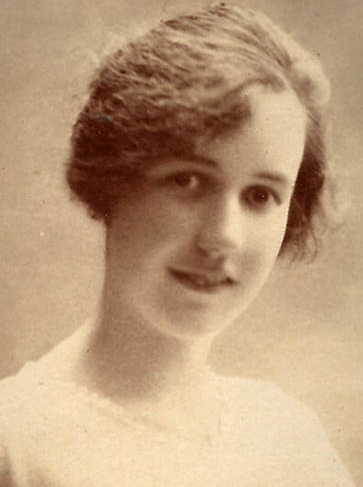
Novelist Elena Puw Morgan (1900–1973)

The most highly regarded and popular novels were in more literary yet realist idiom, however, such as Traed Mewn Cyffion (Feet in Chains; 1936) by Kate Roberts (1891–1985; see below) and the works of Elena Puw Morgan (1900–1973), whose first novel for adults Nansi Lovell (1934) was followed by Y Graith (The Scar) winner of one of the first Prose Medals (Welsh: Y Fedal Ryddiaith) at the Eisteddfod in 1938: this new award for prose was ostensibly equal to the chair and Crown. Morgan would produce a third novel before the end of the decade, Y Wisg Sidan ("The Silk Gown", 1939), and a number of works for children; however, unable to balance writing with her caring responsibilities she wrote nothing new after 1940. She is nevertheless an "accomplished writer" whose early retirement precluded the wider recognition she perhaps deserved.

The most successful novelist of the first half of the 20th century, both commercially and critically (at least at the time), was T. Rowland Hughes (1903–1949), many of whose novels described culture of the slate quarrying regions of North-West Wales, including William Jones (1942) and Chwalfa (1946). Characterised by "gentleness, geniality, and kindness and by the courage of his chief characters", they were the first novels in Welsh to match Daniel Owen for popularity; yet although of undoubted quality Hughes's novels were ultimately romantic, sentimental, even old-fashioned works which in no sense reflected the turbulent war years in which they had been written.

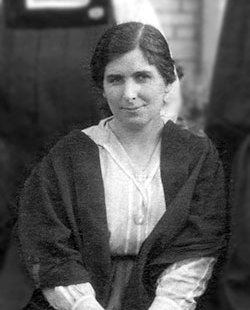
Kate Roberts (1891–1985) in 1923.

As had been the case in the first decades of the century, more innovation was seen in the short story and by the middle of the century a number of prolific writers in the genre had emerged writing in Welsh. These included W. J. Griffith (1875–1931), D. J. Williams (1885–1970) and J. O. Williams (1892–1973), but by far the most famous writer in Welsh to extensively employ the short story was Kate Roberts (1881–1985), who produced the first of many collections of stories, O Gors y Bryniau (From the Hill Bog) in 1925. Her "brief and resonant stories are rooted in the landscape and community of the Caernarfonshire of her childhood", and "often focus on parent-child relationships and on experiences of loss and longing."

==== Children's literature ====
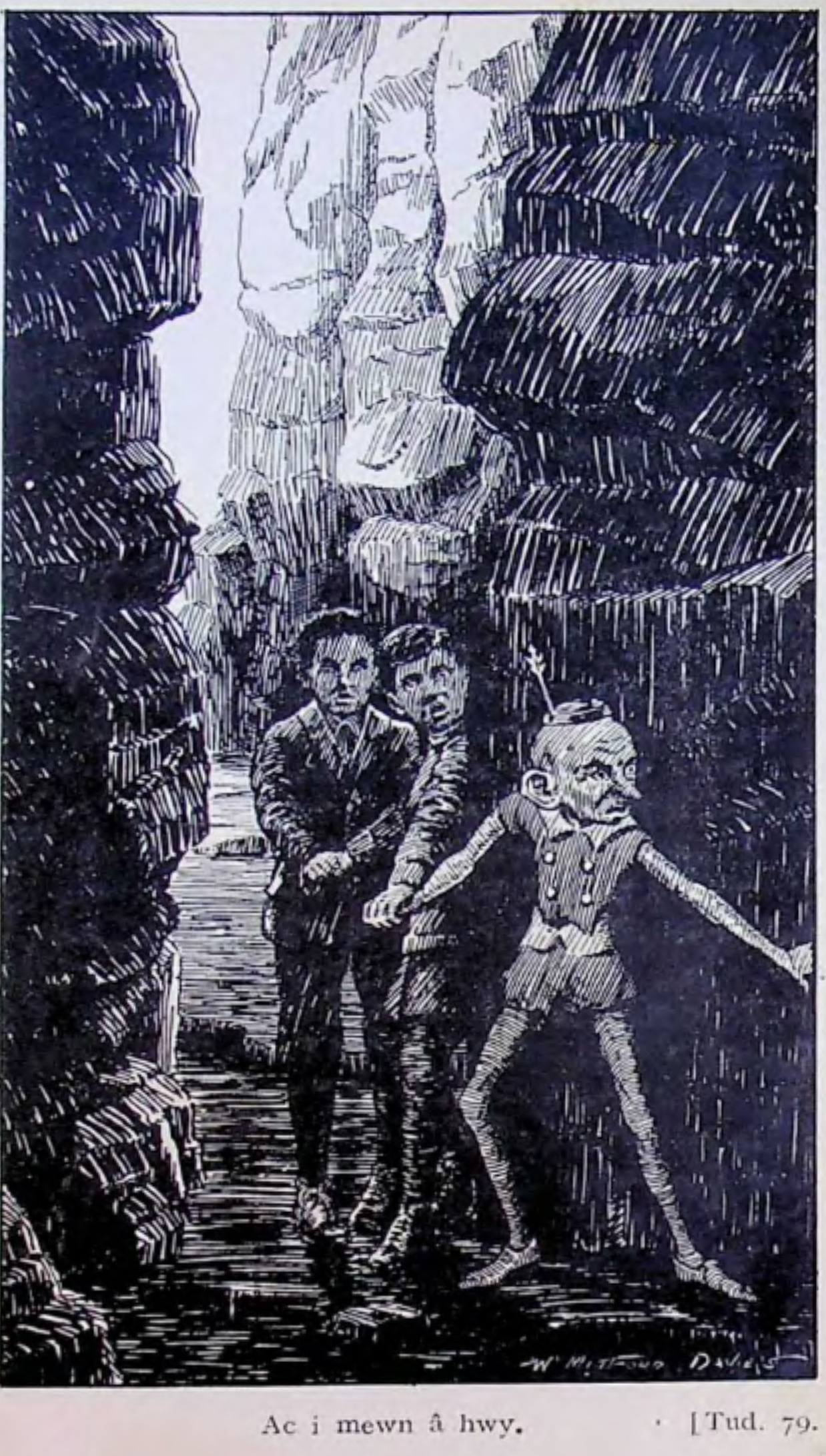
Illustration from Rhys Llwyd y Lleuad (1925), one of E. Tegla Davies's books for children.

Although a few of the denominations had produced printed works aimed at children during the 19th century, and O. M. Edwards had begun the secular children's magazine Cymru'r Plant ('Wales for the Children's) during the 1890s, the 20th century saw authors begin to take writing for children more seriously. Perhaps the two most prominent figures in Welsh children's writing in the first half of the century were E. Tegla Davies (1880–1967), who published at least seven short novels for children between 1912 and 1938 and Moelona (1877–1953) who produced at least four over the same period. Both authors drew on the kind of children's stories widely available in English. Tegla Davies's stories showcased his quirky sense of humour and adventure, and included an early science fiction story Rhys Llwyd y Lleuad (1925); though he also drew on Welsh history and folklore with works like Tir y Dyneddon (1921), and Hen Ffrindiau (1927). The background of Moelona's works was typically more domestic as in her most famous book, Teulu Bach Nantoer (The Little Family at Nantoer; 1912), which was perhaps the most popular children's book of its period, selling over thirty thousand copies. This was not always the case, however: Breuddwydion Myfanwy (1928) is a desert island adventure. Moelona's stories often foreground the role of girls and women in a way male authors rarely did, and perhaps as a result have tended to be characterised as being 'girls' novels', though the frontispieces typically describe them as being 'for children'.

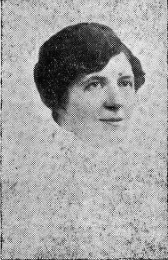
Children's novelist Moelona (Elizabeth Mary Owen, 1877–1953) in 1917.

Although both Tegla Davies and particularly Moelona are now probably better known for their writing for younger readers, both also wrote for adults, and there was not always a clear distinction between writing for these different audiences. Many authors best known for their books for adults produced at least one work for children, such as T. Gwynn Jones who wrote Yn Oes yr Arth a'r Blaidd ('The Age of the Bear and Wolf'; 1908/13), a story about the Stone Age, and T. Rowland Hughes whose first book Storiau Mawr y Byd ('The Great Stories of the World'; 1939) was a retelling of classical and biblical stories as well as others from Celtic and Germanic mythology.

Undoubtedly the single most influential and beloved work in Welsh for children of the first half of the 20th century was Llyfr Mawr y Plant ('The Children's Big Book'; four volumes: 1931, 1939, 1949 and 1975). Written and illustrated mainly by Jennie Thomas (1898–1979) and J. O. Williams (1892–1973) and described seventy years after its first publication as a "masterpiece" and "iconic", it was an attempt to create a Welsh equivalent of the children's literary annuals popular in English, consisting of a combination of stories, poetry, and puzzles, and introduced popular characters like Siôn Blewyn Coch and especially Wil Cwac Cwac, who would later become a television cartoon.

==== Other prose ====
An unusual genre of note in 20th century Welsh literature is the personal or expressive essay (known in Welsh as a Ysgrif), a genre overlapping with the short story and prose poem which occupies a relatively larger position within Welsh-language literature than in other traditions such as English literature, with regular competitions for a Ysgrif at the Eisteddfod (collections of Ysgrifau may also occasionally win the Prose Medal). Generally a literary, rather than polemical or didactic exercise, a Welsh Ysgrif typically takes as its subject an object or event of little inherent significance and uses it to explore the author's personality or emotional state; though they can also portray an individual known to the poet or a specific place, in which case they overlap with historical or travel writing. Though sometimes used in connection to early figures like O. M. Edwards, the Ysgrif is considered to have been pioneered after the First World War by poet T. H. Parry-Williams (1887–1975; see above), who began writing them in 1918 and published dozens in several collections; other prominent writers of Ysgrifau were J. O. Williams (1892–1973), T. J. Morgan (1907–1986) and novelist Islwyn Ffowc Elis (1924–2004; see below); and other literary figures mentioned elsewhere in this article who experimented with the genre in various ways included W. J. Gruffydd, T. Gwynn Jones, Ambrose Bebb, R. T. Jenkins among many others.

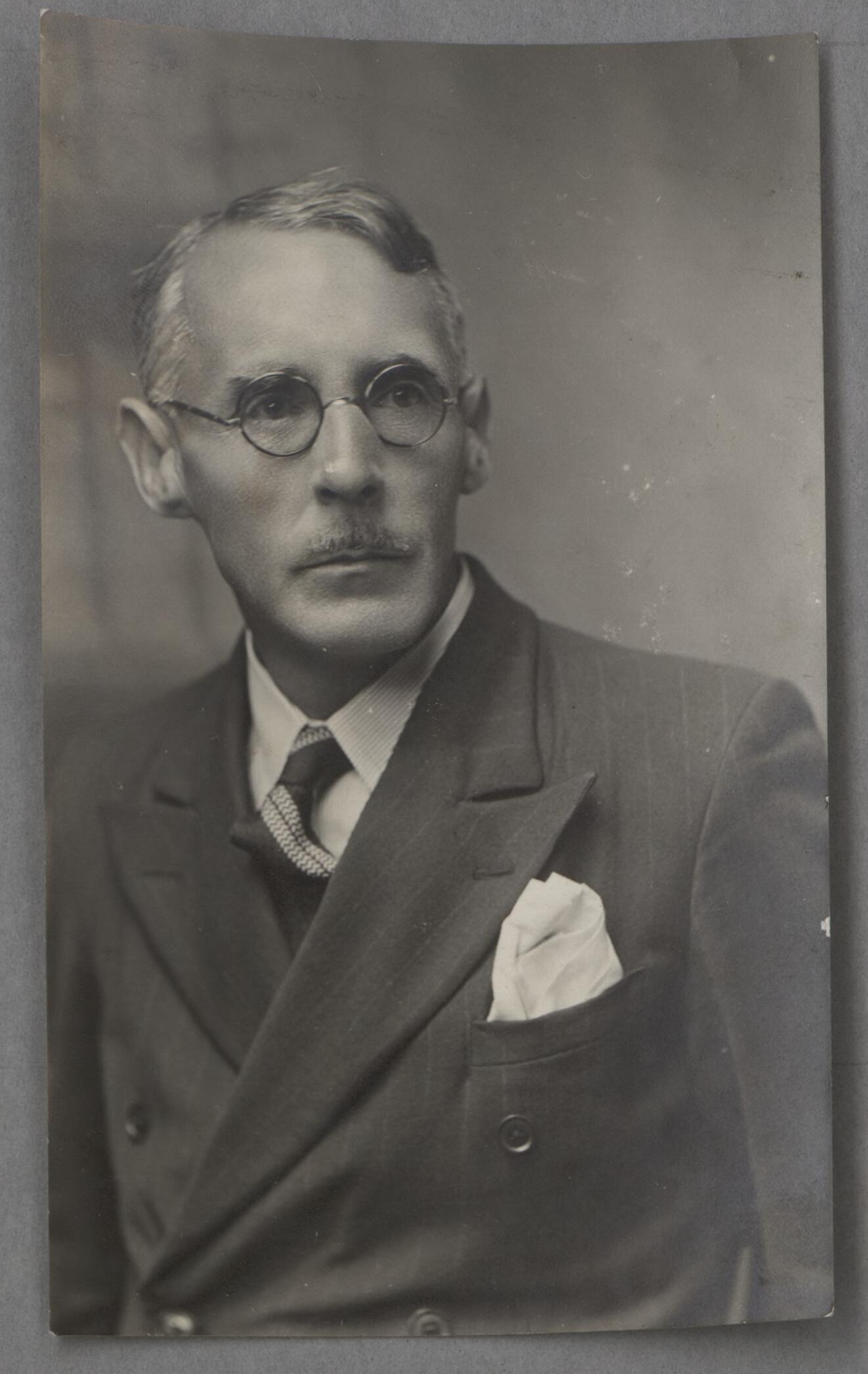
Ambrose Bebb (1894–1955), diarist, historian, travel writer and one of the founders of Plaid Cymru.

O. M. Edwards (1858–1920) was a key figure in the literary revival at the start of the 20th century (see above). In his own right, however, he was a prolific popular historian and occasional travel writer, the latter describing his journeys around Wales as well as to Brittany and Switzerland. Although his historical approach falls well short of modern academic standards and his writing exhibits the prejudices of his age and background, his prose has been described as "charming" and provides a fascinating Welsh perspective on the world at the turn of the 20th century. A similar assessment could be made of a later figure, Ambrose Bebb (1894–1955), who wrote three historical novels but is mainly remembered today for his role in the foundation of Plaid Cymru and in particular for his historical and travel writing, the latter often drawn from his extremely extensive personal diaries, which form a fascinating account of Wales in the period. Bebb had lived in France and like O. M. Edwards before him was fascinated with Brittany, the subject of three of his travel books, learning Breton and becoming associated with the nationalist movement there. Bebb's historical writing, though thorough and scholarly, is notable for "patriotic fervour" and enthusiasm, as well as its use of literary as well as historical references. Like Edwards and Bebb, historian R. T. Jenkins (1881–1969) wrote a number of accessible works of popular history in Welsh.

Whilst Edwards and Bebb's travel writing had focused on the immediate European continent, a few other Welsh writers ventured further afield. The irrepressibly prolific T. Gwynn Jones produced Y Môr Canoldir a'r Aifft ('The Mediterranean and Egypt') in 1912, even though he was travelling on medical advice and meant to be resting; and Eluned Morgan (1870–1938), perhaps the most significant literary figure to emerge from the Welsh-speaking colony in Patagonia, described her travels in South America.

=== 20th-century drama ===
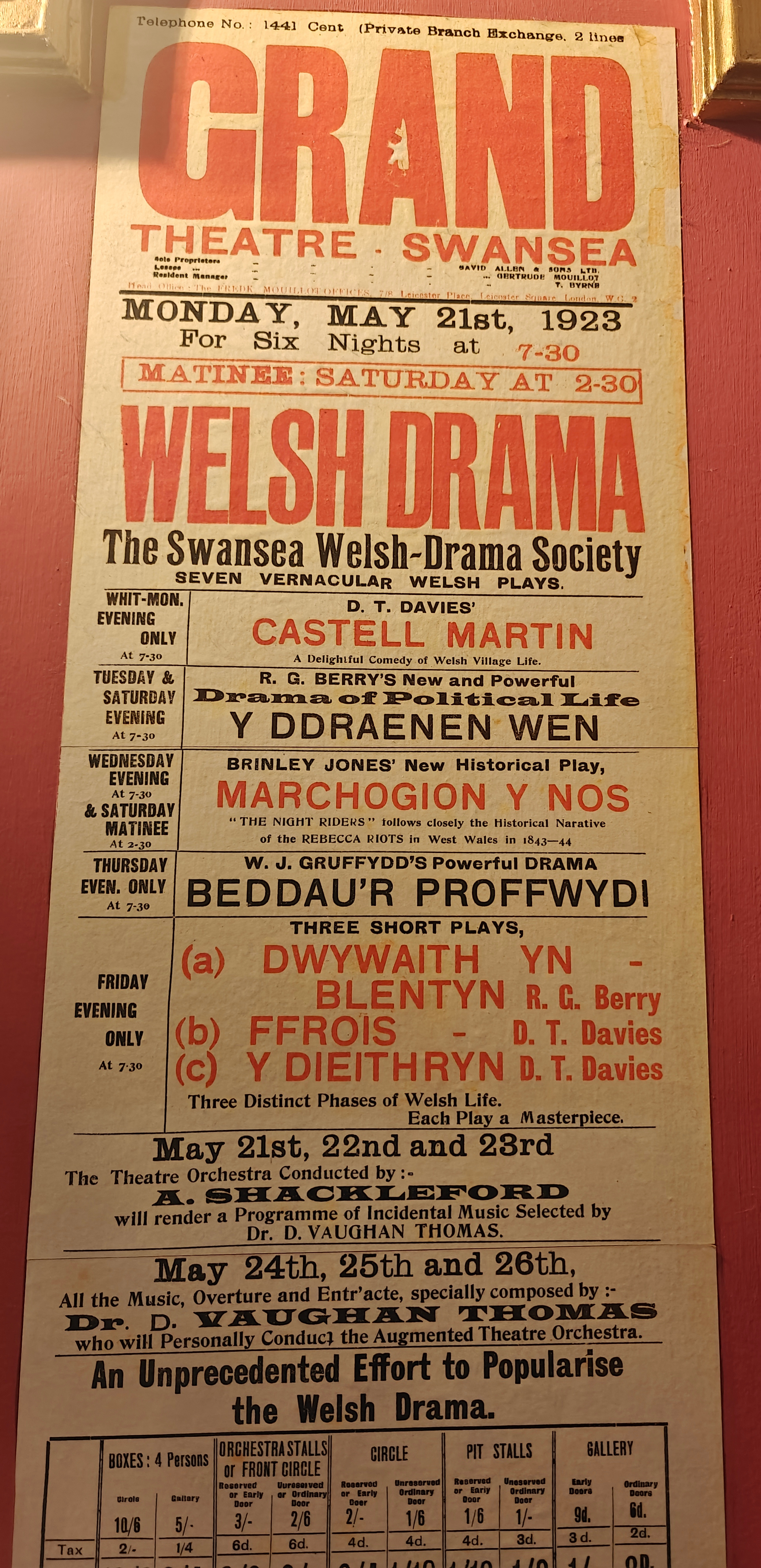
Poster from 1923 advertising performances of Welsh language plays at the Swansea Grand Theatre.

The efforts of Beriah Gwynfe Evans (see above) to establish a Welsh dramatic tradition continued in the first decades of the 20th century, and though largely forgotten today the performance of his Owain Glyndwr at the Investiture of the Prince of Wales in 1911 (for which he had rewritten his original play from 1879) was celebrated at the time as a significant event in the development of a native tradition. Although Evans had experimented with a more naturalistic idiom in Ystori'r Streic ('The Story of the Strike', 1904), Owain Glyndwr was a verse "Pageant" explicitly described as being "in the style of Shakespeare"; of perhaps more importance was the appearance plays in a modern style resembling the work of contemporary English language dramatists like J. M. Synge during the 1910s. A key early example was Beddau'r Proffwydi ('The Prophets' Graves', 1913) by W. J. Gruffydd, written for performance by University students and among the earliest works of realist theatre in Welsh being acknowledged as important milestones in the development of Welsh-language theatre. Gruffydd followed this with the satire Dyrchafiad Arall i Gymro ('A Welshman Promoted Again', 1914); his fellow revival poet T. Gwynn Jones (see above) also wrote a number of plays and translated Macbeth in the 1910s, but whilst these were poets first and foremost, by the 1920s Welsh theatre could boast of figures like R. G. Berry (1869–1945) and David Thomas Davies (1876–1962) who were primarily dramatists; their works were being performed across Wales alongside that of their English-language contemporary John Oswald Francis (1882–1956), who encouraged the translation and performance of his plays in Welsh.

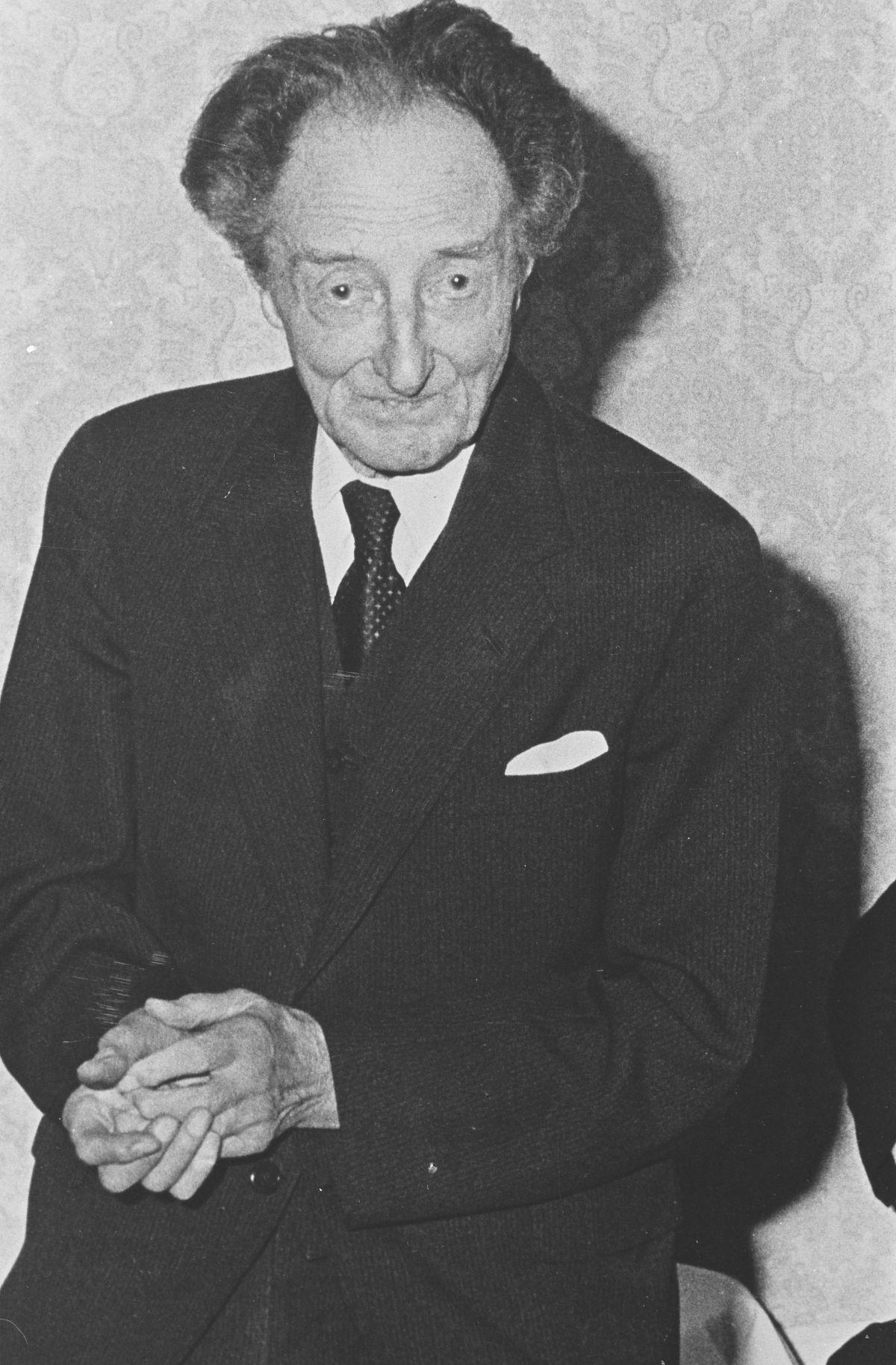
Saunders Lewis (1893–1985), a major figure in 20th century Welsh literature and politics.

These figures' work was built on during the middle decades of the 20th century by younger playwrights. In Cwm Glo ('Coal Valley', 1934) James Kitchener Davies (1902–1952) depicted the impact of the Depression on the South Wales Valleys in a bleak and unromantic fashion which contrasted starkly with the novels of T. Rowland Hughes, whose own play Y Ffordd ('The Road', 1945) extended his gentler approach into theatre. John Gwilym Jones (1904–1988) was an occasional novelist and short story writer but plays formed the bulk of his literary output; beginning with works like Y Brodyr ('The Brothers', 1934) and Diofal yw Dim ('Careless is Nothing', 1942) he introduced a Brechtian modernism to Welsh theatre, continuing to and produce write plays until 1979. However, perhaps the most significant figure in Welsh theatre of the mid 20th century, indeed of any period, and one of the major figures of the century in Welsh literature and public life was Saunders Lewis (1893–1985). He was a crucial figure in his country's political scene as the founder of the party later known as Plaid Cymru. Outside politics Lewis was an influential academic and essayist, important poet and an occasional novelist, but his main literary legacy was in works for the stage. His plays – some written for the radio – include Blodeuwedd (1923–25, revised 1948), Buchedd Garmon (1936) and Siwan (1956) among others, and drew upon a wide range of material and subject matter including Welsh mythology and history as well as the Bible, although he also wrote plays set in contemporary Wales. A complex and sometimes controversial figure, the influence and significance of his dramatic output was recognised with a Nobel Prize nomination in 1970.

== 1950–2000 ==
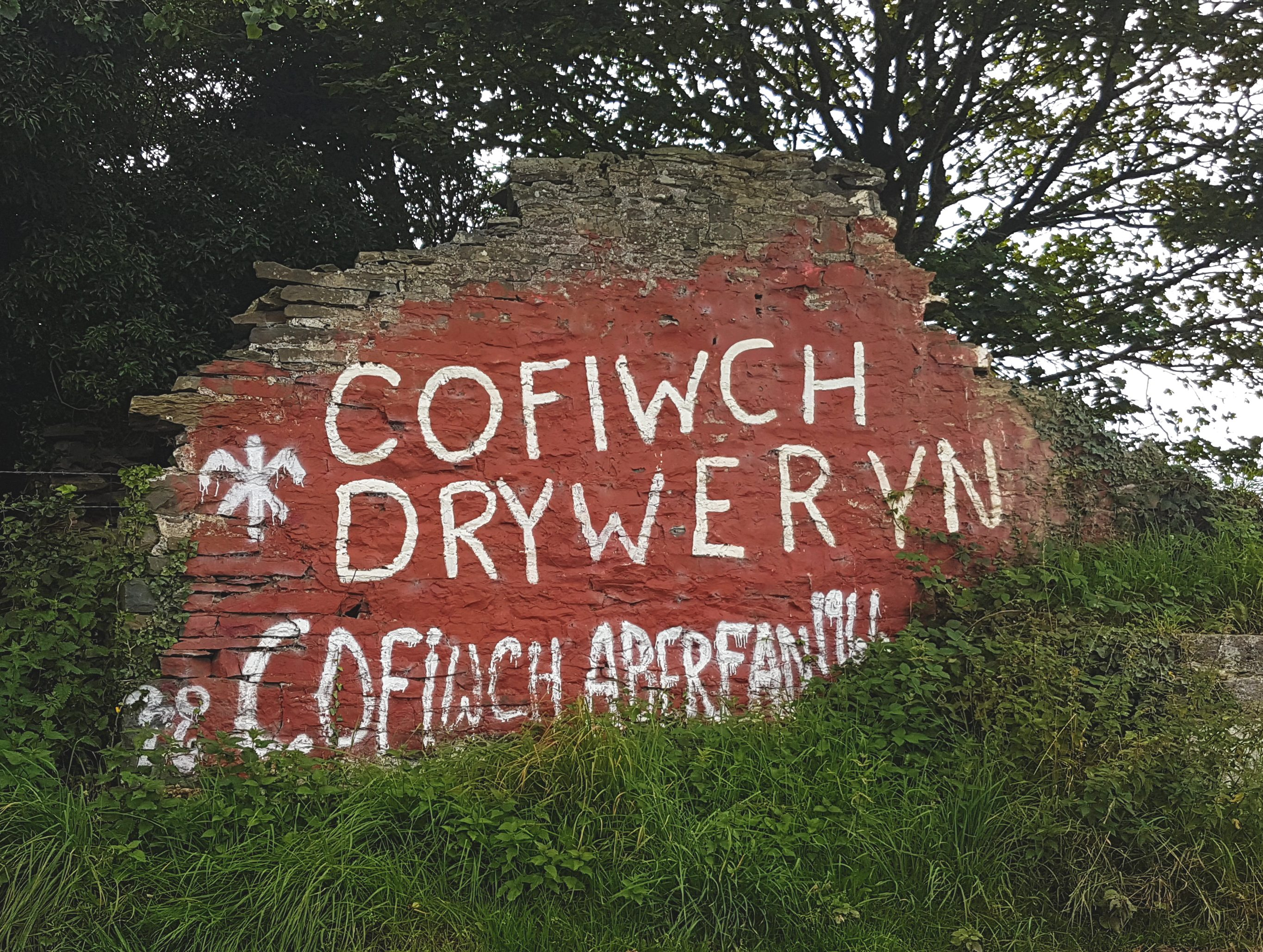
The Cofiwch Dryweryn memorial in August 2017

During the second half of the 20th century the question of the future of Welsh as a living language took centre stage in Welsh public discourse in a way that had never previously been the case. The flooding of the Tryweryn valley (played out from 1955 to 1965) and the associated protests, though in some sense a defeat, galvanised support for devolution, independence and language rights, as did Saunders Lewis's highly influential radio lecture Tynged yr Iaith of 1962 which predicted the extinction of Welsh within a generation without radical change. In a similar way to Tryweryn, whilst the crushing rejection of self-determination in the 1979 Welsh devolution referendum represented a practical defeat for Welsh nationalism by any measure, it nevertheless had a galvanising psychological impact that shone through in poets' and novelists' artistic responses.

Although Welsh continued to decline as a spoken language during the third quarter of the 20th century, concern for the language began to be reflected in increased support from the state and wider society through institutions like the universities, Welsh-medium education (designated Welsh-medium schools, in which most instruction was in Welsh, began appearing in the 1940s and by the end of the century approximately a fifth of Welsh schoolchildren were in such schools), Urdd Gobaith Cymru (a youth organisation founded in 1922 by Ifan ab Owen Edwards (1895–1970), the Books Council of Wales (founded 1961), Radio Cymru (1977), S4C (1982) among others; as well as political and pressure groups like Plaid Cymru and Cymdeithas yr Iaith. These both fed off and drove improving social attitudes towards the language. Thanks to the efforts of pioneers in the first half of the century like O. M. Edwards and W. J. Gruffydd (see above) as well as politicians across the political spectrum such as David Lloyd George (1863–1945; the only Welsh Prime Minister), Jim Griffiths (1890–1975), Saunders Lewis (1893–1985), Gwynfor Evans (1912–2005), Cledwyn Hughes (1916–2001) and Nicholas Edwards (1934–2018), by the end of the 20th century there was widespread support in Wales for the preservation and continued use of Welsh, which bore fruit in Welsh Language Acts passed in 1967 and 1993, codifying language rights for Welsh speakers, and the stabilisation of the decline in the officially recorded numbers of Welsh speakers by the 1980s, though a sense of vulnerability has remained. By the end of the century, a small majority had voted in favour of self-government in the 1997 Welsh devolution referendum, granting Wales a degree of political independence for the first time since the days of Owain Glyndŵr.

The Welsh literature of the late 20th century reflects these oppositions between despair, anxiety and hope, whilst also responding in full to wider contemporary developments in aesthetics such as modernism and post-modernism, in technology including radio and television, as well as the period's social concerns, including but not limited to civil rights (often framed in Wales in terms of language rights), feminism, the Sexual revolution, the Cold War, the end of colonialism and environmentalism.

=== Welsh poetry since 1950 ===
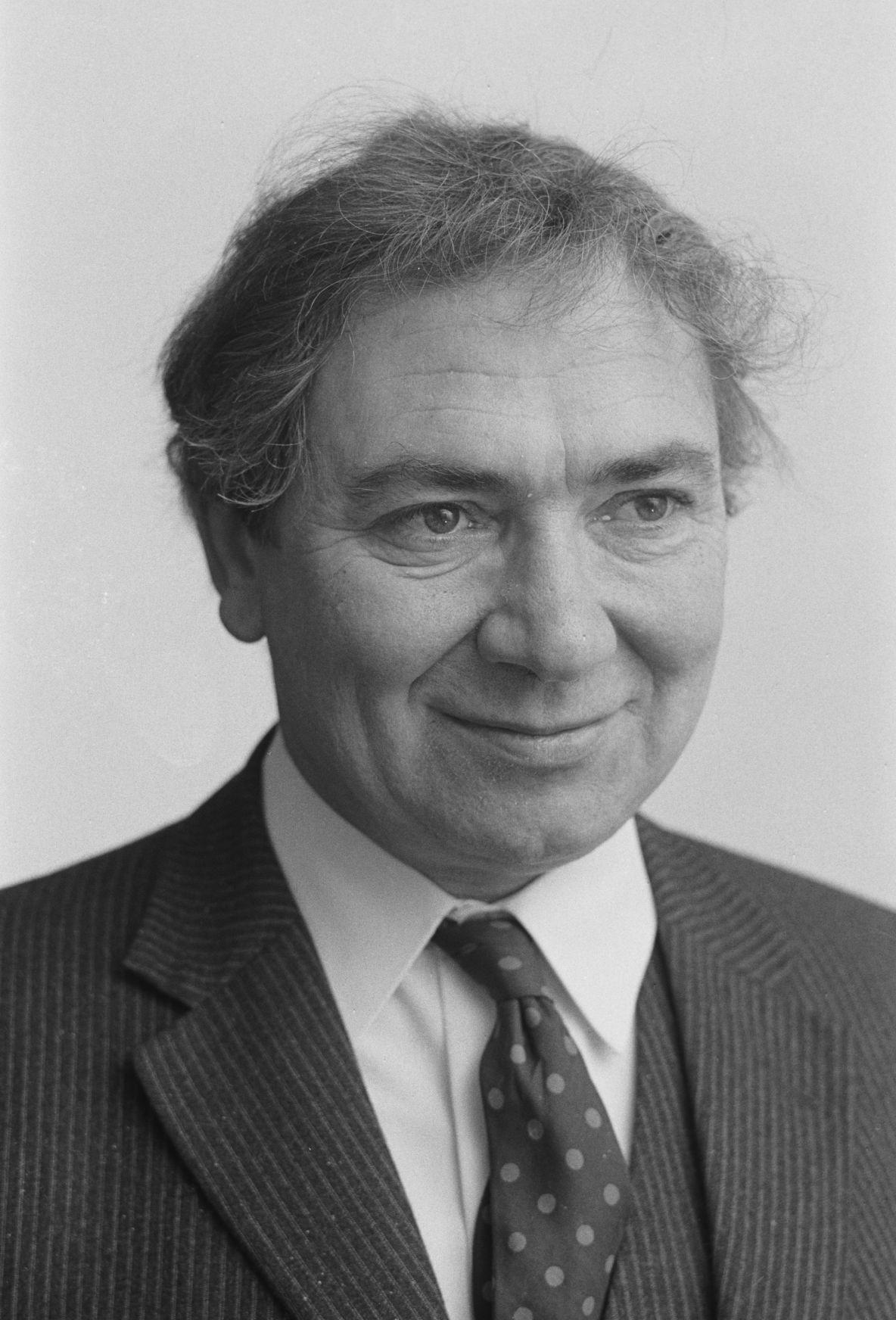
Poet and novelist T. Glynne Davies (1926–1988), author of Adfeilion and Marged.

An influential poet who emerged at the start of the 1950s was T. Glynne Davies (1926–1988). His poem Adfeilion ('Ruins') has been described as one of the greatest poems ever to win the Crown, which it did in 1951. Depicting rural depopulation and the decline of traditional ways of life, with the obvious implications for the language, it tapped into the zeitgeist of the time and would prove a major influence on poets of the 1950s and 60s. However, of the poets who emerged in the 1950s perhaps the most notable was Euros Bowen (1904–1988). The older brother of Geraint Bowen, who had won the Chair in 1946 for an awdl in a neoclassical vein (see above), Euros Bowen was a later developer who only began writing poetry in his late forties; nevertheless as a poet he was the more radical of the brothers and could be counted as one of the most stylistically innovative poets of the 20th century in Welsh. Utilising only the free metres, his earlier work was formally conventional enough to see him win the Crown in 1948 and 1950; he would later extensively explore vers libre as well as producing a whole volume of prose poems. An Anglican curate, much of his poetry is religious in nature, developing further the declamatory spirit of earlier poets like Gwenallt.

The 1960s saw the emergence of two contemporaries who would both go on to become some of the major poetic voices in Welsh of the second half of the 20th century: Bobi Jones (1929–2017) and Gwyn Thomas (1936–2016). They had many things in common: both wrote extensively in vers libre, both were academics (at Aberystwyth and Bangor respectively) and both were extremely prolific poets; yet in other respects they represented diametrically opposite poetical approaches. Bobi Jones, who often used his full name Robert Maynard Jones when writing academic work, had learned Welsh as an adult; he would nevertheless go on to become "by far the most prolific writer in Welsh of his lifetime". His publications, almost exclusively in Welsh, number in the hundreds and cover Welsh literature of all periods (he was a particular champion of the literature of the 19th century, a period often maligned by others), literary theory, religious writing, novels and other prose works but especially poetry. An Evangelical Christian, Bobi Jones was fiercely critical of post-modernism and the scepticism he perceived as being both widespread and devoid of meaning; but he was an equally fierce critic of populism of all kinds, being of the firm belief that the vitality of Welsh required its readers to be stretched. His prodigious output was a conscious expression of these diverse perspectives. Often ruggedly intellectual and demanding, his poetry is also often playful: his poem Hunllef Arthur ('Arthur's Nightmare'; 1986) may be the longest poem ever written in Welsh, but it is a satire of epic poetry. Thomas, however, was a poet who eagerly engaged with modern popular culture, especially film and television, and wanted to bring poetry to life for a wide audience. He became National Poet of Wales in 2006. He was an innovator nonetheless, writing in the free metres and especially vers libre but often using everyday, colloquial and even anglicised language, whilst dealing with subjects of universal and timeless relevance, such as in one of his most famous poems, Croesi Traeth ('Crossing a Beach'; 1978). Long a feature of GCSE syllabuses, it is a reflection on mortality and ageing through the portrait of a young family enjoying a day at the beach.

==== 1970s strict meter renaissance ====
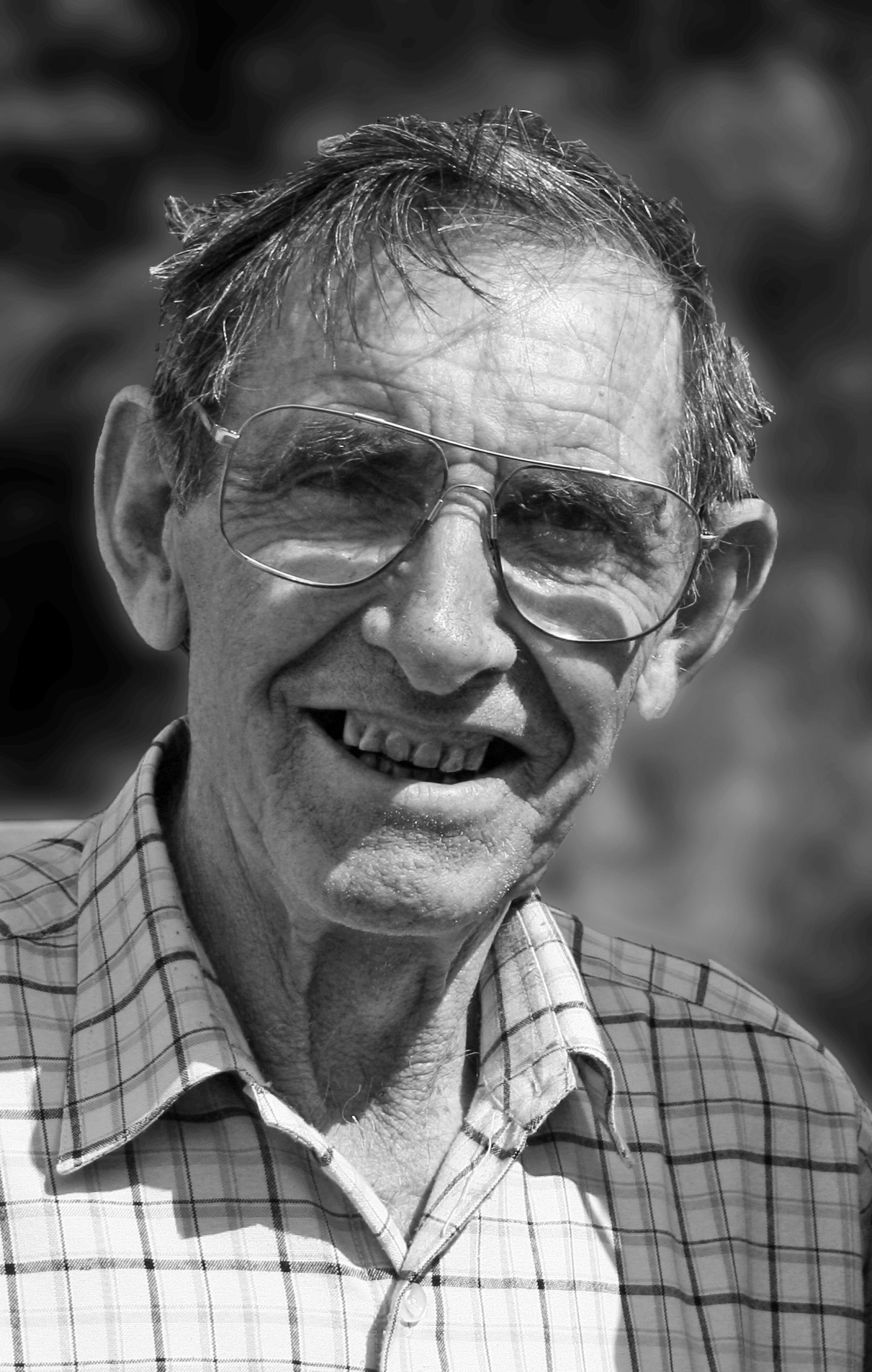
Dic Jones (1934–2009), a latter-day bardd gwlad.

Most of the prominent names in Welsh poetry during the central part of the 20th century – whether they were new poets like Glynne Davies, Bobi Jones and Gwyn Thomas, or the older more established voices like Alun Llywelyn-Williams, Gwenallt and Waldo Williams, and even figures from earlier who were still writing and publishing poetry such as T. H. Parry-Williams and Cynan, were primarily known as poets in the free metres even if they produced poetry in cynghanedd occasionally (or had done so earlier in their careers); and it would be easy to view the period 1940–1960 as one in which poetry in the strict meters saw comparatively little development. This would change in the 1960s and especially the 1970s, however, yet another period in the history of Welsh literature which has been termed a dadeni (renaissance), part of a pattern, argues Dafydd Johnston, in which "The Welsh literary tradition can be seen to have renewed itself periodically by turning back upon itself deriving energy and inspiration from its past." The emergence of Dic Jones (1934–2009), who won the Chair in 1966 with his awdl on Cynhaeaf ('Harvest') was a significant event. A farmer in Ceredigion his entire life who had left school at 15, in contrast to university poets like Bobi Jones and Gwyn Thomas he was a latter-day example of a concept known in Welsh as the Bardd Gwlad ('Country Poet'): a poet rooted in his local community writing about local events and concerns rather than grander intellectual ones. Beirdd Gwlad had always used the strict metres and Dic Jones was no exception; his eisteddfod awdlau Cynhaeaf and 1976's Gwanwyn ('Spring'), which would have won him a second Chair that year had he not been disqualified on a technicality, are regarded as two of the finest poems ever produced for the competition; he was also a master of shorter forms such as the englyn. Like his two Eisteddfod awdlau, much of his poetry explored rural life. The combination of this grounded Bardd Gwlad aesthetic and his complete mastery of his medium ensured that of all the modern proponents of poetry in cynghanedd he perhaps achieved the widest general popularity, and by the time of his death (at which point he was serving as Archdruid) was regarded as a "national icon" who had brought a new accessibility and relevance to the strict metres.

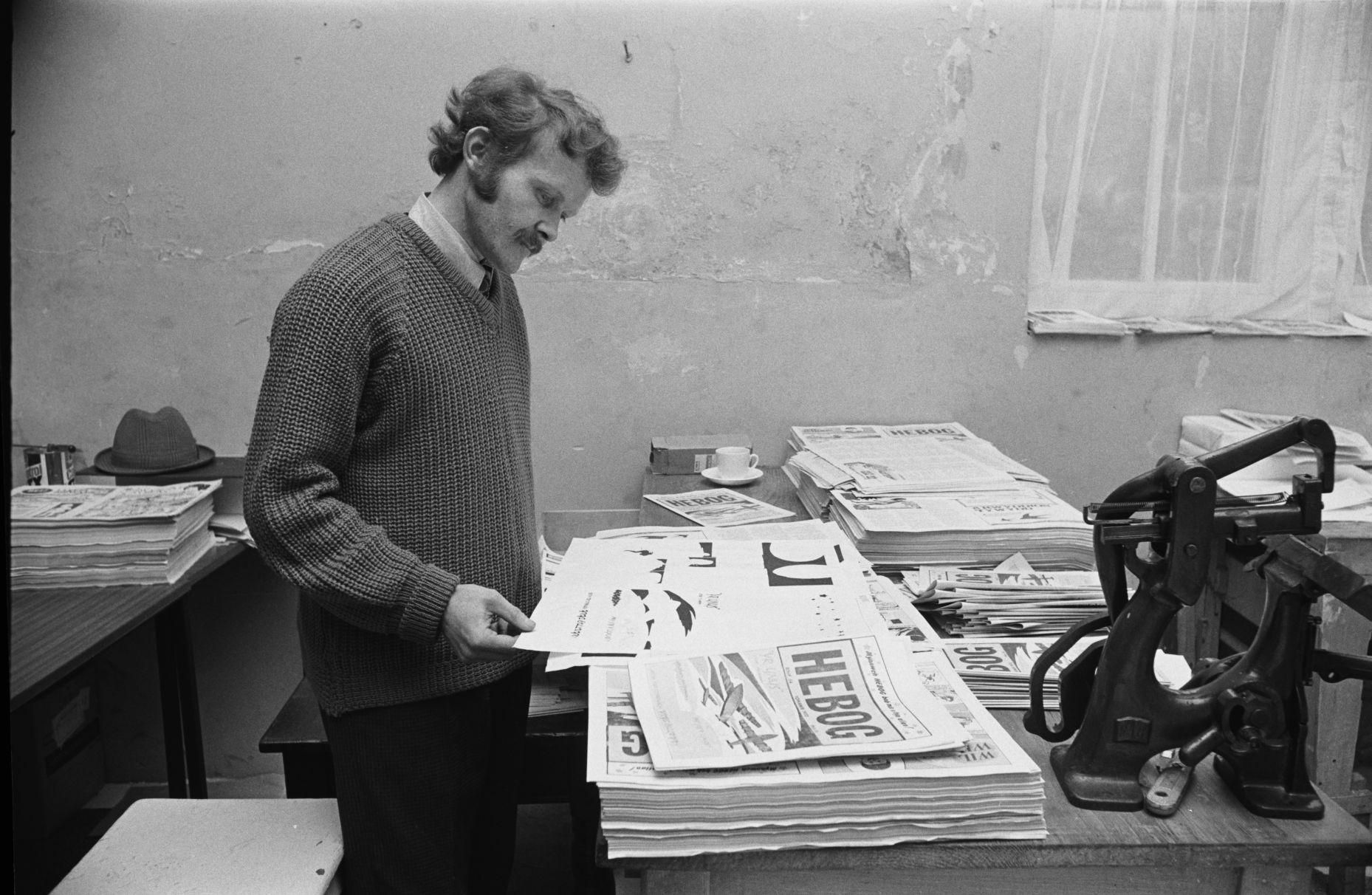
Gerallt Lloyd Owen (1944–2014)

Dic Jones's emergence heralded a new golden age for cynghanedd which continued for the rest of the century. The early 1970s saw the emergence of two major practitioners in the strict metres whose poetic approach would be starkly different to Dic Jones, both of whom would also work tirelessly beyond their own poetry to maintain the art of strict metre poetry and foster the next generation. Gerallt Lloyd Owen (1944–2014) was perhaps the most famous and popular strict metre poet of his generation in Welsh; he would go on to serve extensively as an Eisteddfod adjudicator and for thirty years as the chair of Talwrn y Beirdd, a radio programme in which poets compete with spontaneously composed poetry. He also produced two Welsh comic books. However, he is best remembered the Welsh poet whose art most directly responds to the Welsh national crisis/revival of the 1960s and 70s Tynged yr Iaith and the flooding of Tryweryn. A fervent Welsh nationalist, he first came to prominence with poems he had composed to protest against the 1969 investiture of Prince Charles. Whilst his poems often venerate national heroes of the past, particularly Llywelyn ap Gruffudd, any suggestion of Romanticism is banished by his often bitter attitude towards the Welsh themselves (in which he resembles R. S. Thomas, though the voice is his own) and his graphically modernist imagery, as in the opening lines of his poem Fy Ngwlad (1969), referring directly to the investiture, which are among the most famous lines of 20th century cynghanedd:

Wylit, wylit Lywelyn
Wylit waed pe gwelit hyn

You'd weep, you'd weep, Llywelyn
You'd weep blood if you saw this.

Cilmeri, believed to be the site of Llywelyn's death in 1282, was set as the subject for the chair in 1982, the 700th anniversary of the event, Gerallt Lloyd Owen's victory was inevitable, and his victorious awdl is a latter-day masterpiece of the genre which both evokes and reinvents the medieval tradition of praise and elegy as a powerful contemporary political statement. The poem can also be seen as part of a wider body of poetry which addressed and mourned the result of the 1979 Welsh devolution referendum, in which Welsh self-government had been soundly rejected.

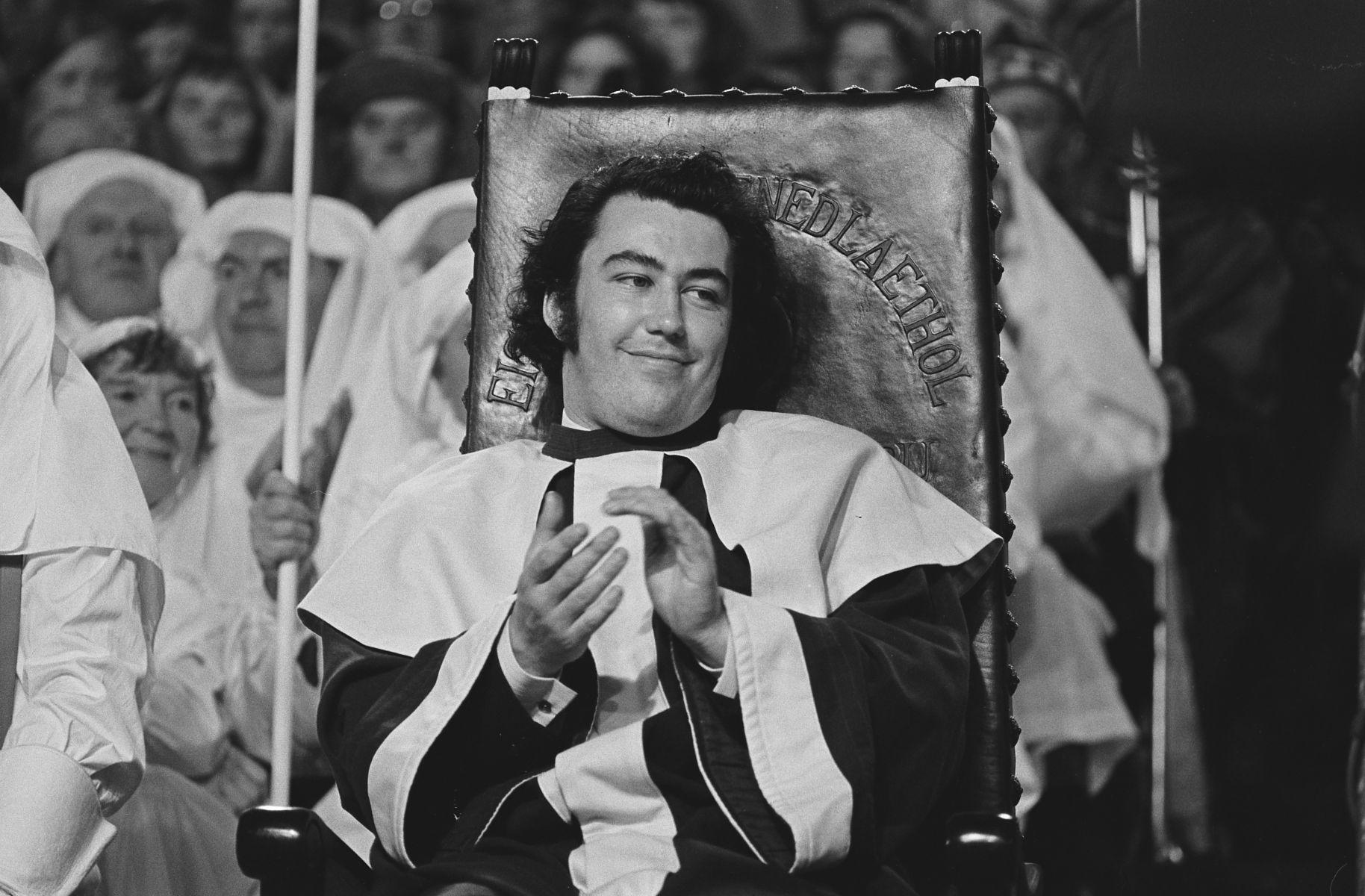
Alan Llwyd (b.1948) winning the Chair at the 1973 Eisteddfod.

In 1973, the year before Gerallt Lloyd Owen won his first Eisteddfod Chair, the competition had been won by Alan Llwyd (b.1948), who compounded his achievement by winning the Crown as well (the first such 'double' since T. H. Parry-Williams back in 1915); even more remarkably he would repeat the same feat (as Parry-Williams had done) three years later. A major voice in Welsh poetry of the 20th and 21st centuries, he has published widely in both the strict and free metres as well as vers libre, as well as editing anthologies and publishing biographies of a number of literary figures, with his poetry often differentiated from that of his contemporaries by a more personal note, for example in his series of Sonedau i Janice for his wife (pub. 1996). Although he has published copiously in all poetic forms he is one of the most widely recognised living practitioners of strict metre poetry. A rule in place forbidding awarding a Chair to those who had already won two was lifted in 2023, and Llwyd would go on to win the chair a third time that year, a full half century after his first victory. This makes him, as of 2025, the most successful Eisteddfod poet alive in terms of the number of times he has won the main prizes (5), and tied with Dewi Emrys as the most successful Eisteddfod poet of all time (by this metric).

The sense of revival was not confined to the strict meters. Bryan Martin Davies (1933–2015) came to prominence as the winner of the 1970 crown and would go on to be described as "one of the most accomplished free meter poets" of his age. Other major poets included T. James Jones (born 1934); Donald Evans (born 1940), who repeated the 'double-double' feat of Parry-Williams and Alan Llwyd by winning both chair and crown at two separate National Eisteddfodau (1977 and 1980); Nesta Wyn Jones (1946–2025); Einir Jones (born 1950), who also writes extensively for children, and Menna Elfyn (born 1951), "perhaps Wales's best-known feminist poet". The emergence of these latter three voices in Welsh poetry represented a significant female inroad into what had always been a male-dominated field over the centuries (notwithstanding individual exceptions like Ann Griffiths and Cranogwen). This situation stands in stark contrast to prose, where many of the main figures of Welsh had always been women. The strict metres in particular would remain male-dominated until the twenty-first century: although Dilys Cadwaladr (1902–1979) was the first woman to win the Crown, doing so in 1953, a feat that would be repeated by others like Eluned Phillips (1914–2009) and Einir Jones, it would not be until 2001 that the Chair would be won by a woman, Mererid Hopwood (b.1964), who would go on to become the first female Archdruid. Among the female poets who emerged in the 1970s, Nesta Wyn Jones was noted for her "artful subtlety"; whilst Menna Elfyn has become a major voice in Welsh poetry and been particularly successful in translation.

The strict metres saw another flowering during the 1990s, which, it has been suggested, should be seen as a continuation of the 1970s revival as many of the same poets were still active. New poets to emerge in the last decade of the century included names such as Myrddin ap Dafydd (born 1956), Iwan Llwyd (1957–2010), Emyr Lewis (born 1957), Twm Morys (born 1961), Meirion McIntyre Huws (born 1963), Mererid Hopwood (born 1964), Ceri Wyn Jones (born 1967) among others; some of these were part of a loose grouping known as the "cywyddwyr cyhoeddus" ('Public Cywydd-writers') after the publication in 1994 of a volume of poetry under the title Cywyddau Cyhoeddus, a collection rehabilitating the Cywydd, a form which had been popularised as long ago as the 14th century but had been comparatively neglected by more recent generations.

=== Late 20th-century prose ===
==== 1950–1980: The Welsh novel comes of age ====
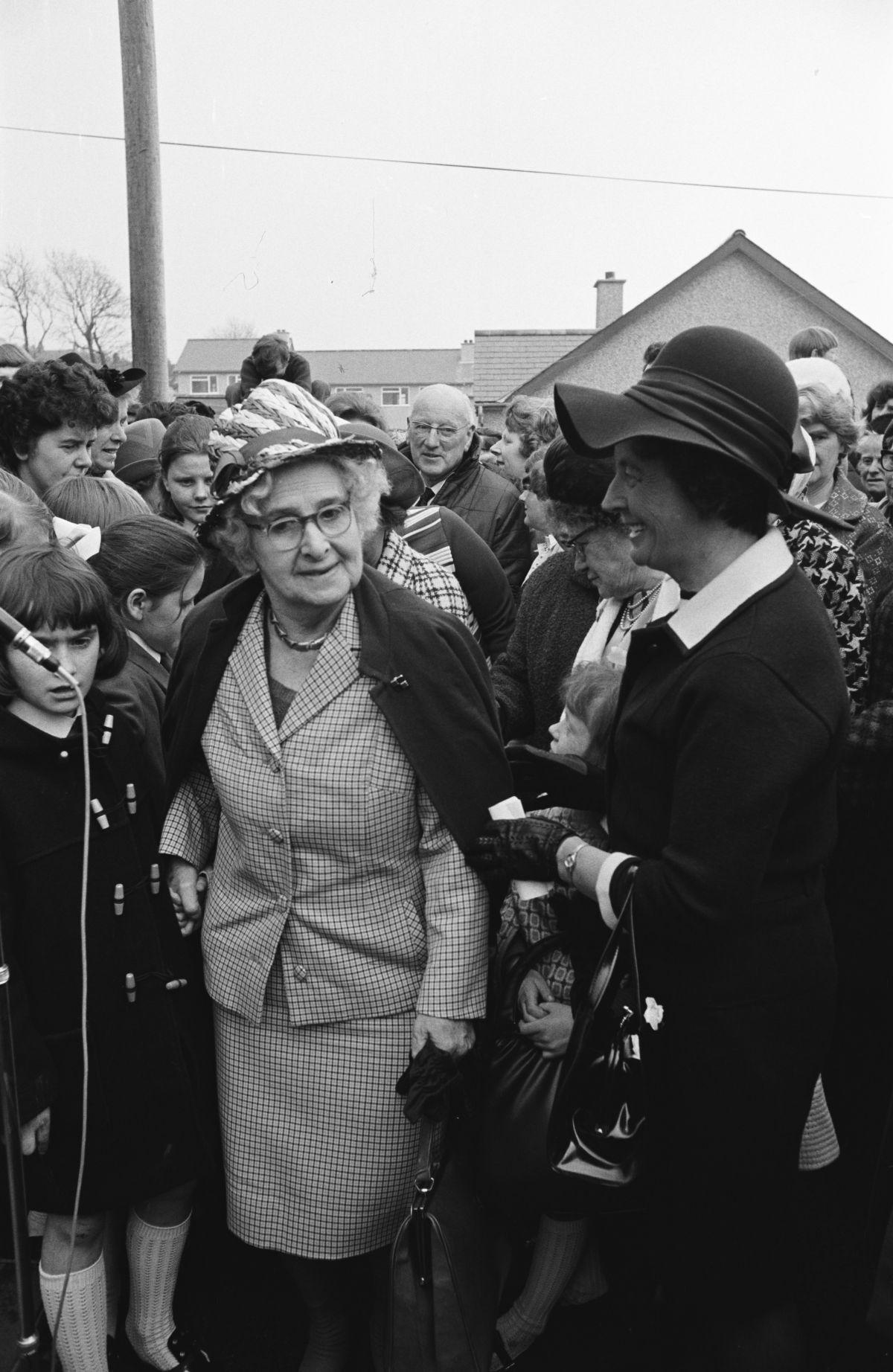
Kate Roberts (1891–1985), left, in 1971, presenting her childhood home of Cae'r Gors as a gift to the Welsh nation.

Prior to 1950 very few Welsh-language novelists could be said to have made a lasting impact on Welsh literature, but this would change dramatically over the following decades. Kate Roberts (see above) had been active as a novelist and short story writer since the 1920s, but after a hiatus for much of the 40s began writing again at the end of that decade. This second period, which begins with the novella Stryd y Glep (1949) she went on to produce a remarkable string of novels, novellas, and story collections through the 1950s and 1960s – among them some of her best-known works such as Y Byw Sy'n Cysgu (1956; 'The Living that Sleep'), Te yn y Grug (1959; 'Tea in the Heather'), Tywyll Heno (1962; Dark Tonight, a reference to Canu Heledd) and Prynu Dol a Straeon Eraill (1969; 'Buying a Doll and Other Stories') – and occasionally thereafter up until her last collection, Haul y Drycin ('Storm Sun') in 1981. Though her work from this period is distinctly feminist and often depicts the lives of working-class women much as her previous work had done, much (though not all) of this later work is considerably darker in tone. This is particularly true of Y Byw Sy'n Cysgu, whose main character is abandoned by her husband; and Tywyll Heno, whose main character is suffering a mental health crisis. These works, alongside those of her first period such as Traed Mewn Cyffion (1936), had earned Roberts the moniker "Brenhines ein llên" ("The Queen of our Literature") by the time of hear death in 1981. She has been described as the most significant female prose writer in Welsh.

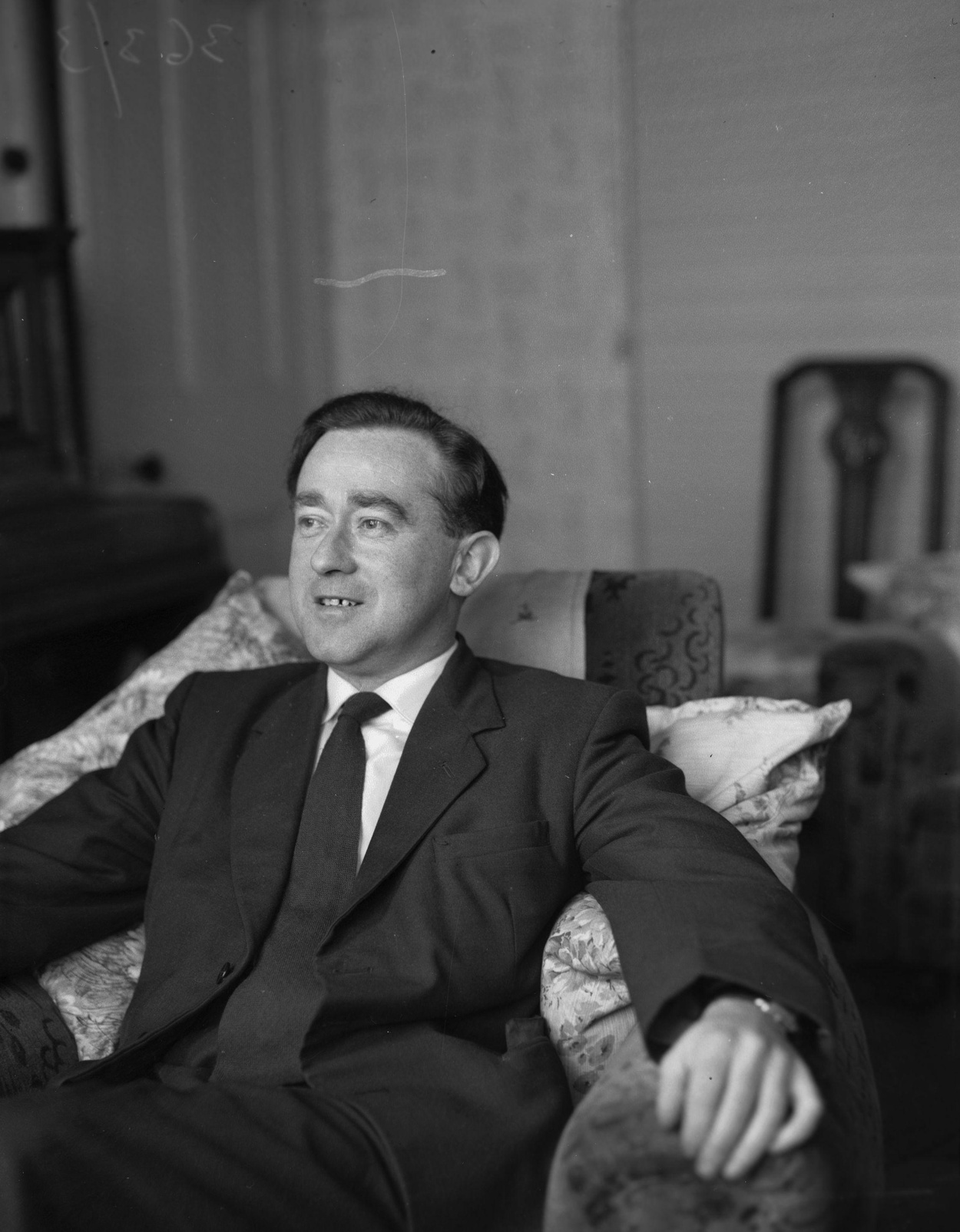
Islwyn Ffowc Elis (1924–2004)

Contemporary to Roberts's second period was another novelist who would also earn a great degree of affection from his countrymen. Islwyn Ffowc Elis (1924–2004) began his career with Cysgod y Cryman (1953; 'Shadow of the Sickle'), a novel depicting a farm in rural Wales which discusses the rising political forces of Communism and Welsh Nationalism. It proved an enormous critical and commercial success and in a 2000 popular poll would be voted the favourite Welsh novel of the 20th century. Elis would return to the same characters with his third novel, Yn ôl i Leifior (1956; 'Return to Lleifior') after the critical failure of his second, Ffenestri Tua'r Gwyll (1955; 'Windows on the Twilight'). However, beginning with his fourth novel, Wythnos yng Nghymru Fydd (1956; 'A Week in Wales that Will Be'), a time travel story which is a rare example of science fiction in Welsh up to that point, Elis would take a deliberately populist direction, seeking to fill what he perceived as a need for a more accessible, less self-consciously literary kind of writing in Welsh during the 1960s, though he would write little after 1970.

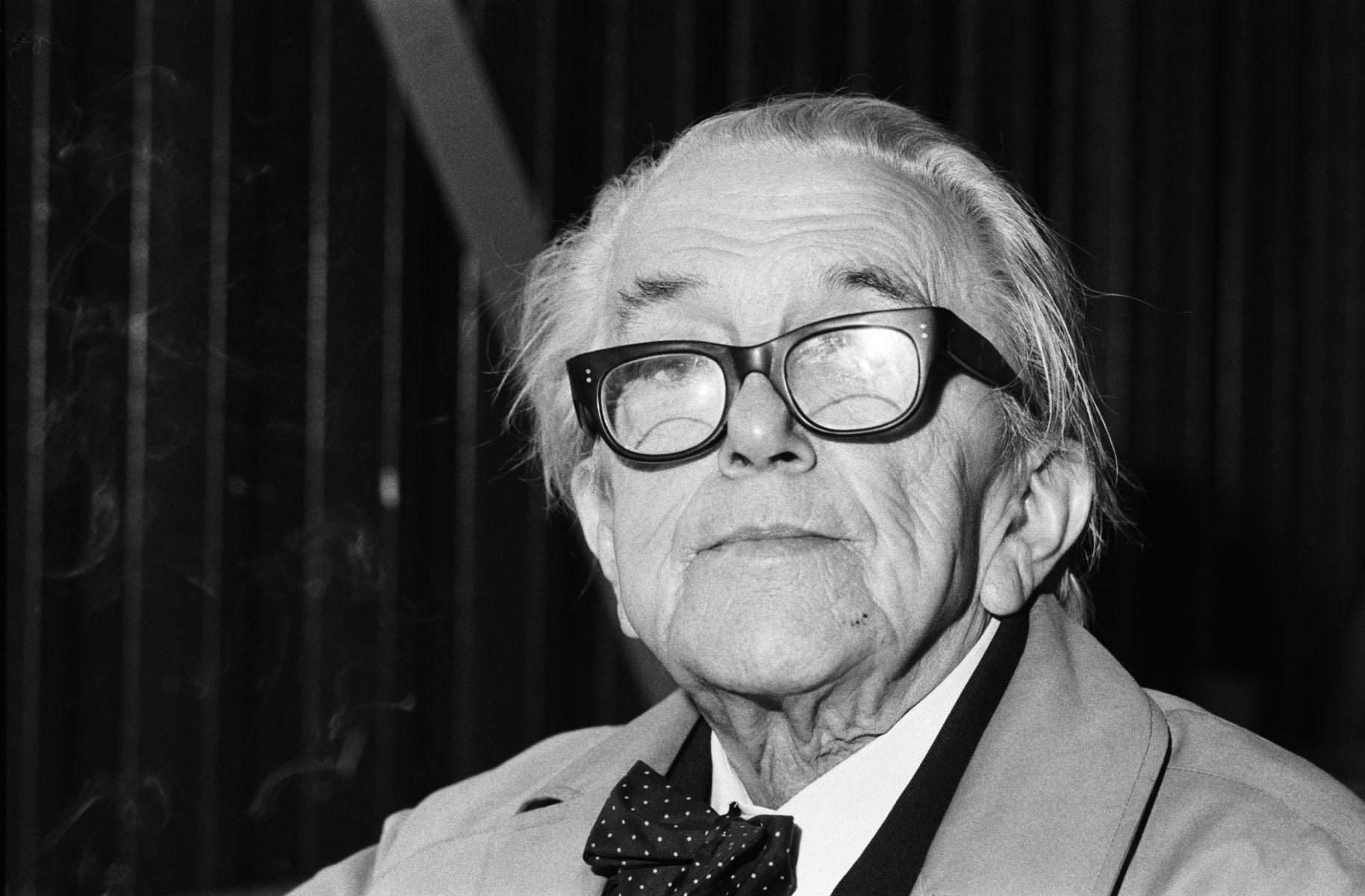
Caradog Prichard (1904–1980)

It was neither Roberts nor Elis, however, that would produce the most critically discussed novel of this period, but rather a figure who had risen to prominence as a poet decades earlier. Caradog Prichard (1904–1980) had achieved fame in the 1920s by winning the Eisteddfod Crown on three consecutive occasions; and yet it is for his only novel, Un Nos Ola Leuad (1961; variously translated as Full Moon or One Moonlit Night) that he is best remembered today. Set in a fictional version of Bethesda, it provides a bleak and cynical portrait of the slate-quarrying communities of North-West Wales that stands in stark contrast to the stoic, noble depiction of the same communities by Kate Roberts let alone T. Rowland Hughes (though it bears some resemblance to works by Caradoc Evans and Dylan Thomas). It is also notable for being written entirely in colloquial rather than literary language, something which had been done before but never in so consciously literary a work, but would influence later writers such as Robin Llywelyn (see below). Un Nos Ola Leuad remains one of the most popular and best regarded of Welsh novels and was included on the "Big Jubilee Read" list of 70 books by Commonwealth authors, selected to celebrate the Platinum Jubilee of Elizabeth II.

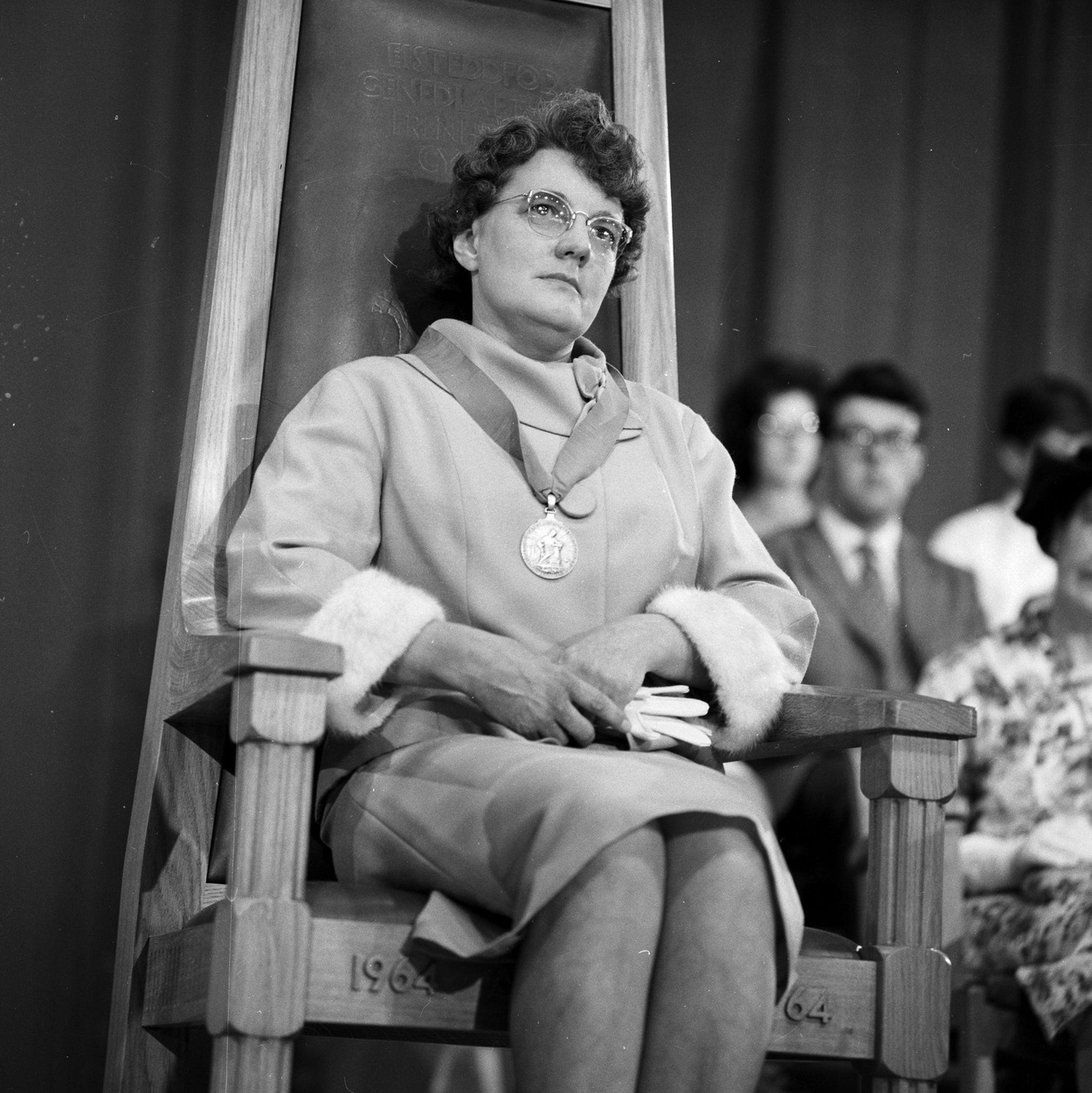
Historical novelist Rhiannon Davies Jones (1921–2014) at the 1964 Eisteddfod.

Alongside the above names a number of other highly respected voices in the Welsh novel emerged during the 1960s and 1970s. Pennar Davies (1911–1996) wrote a series of works, among them novels including Meibion Darogan (1968; 'Sons of Prophecy') which pioneered a form of radical Christian utopianism. Rhydwen Williams (1916–1997) produced a trilogy of novels from 1969 to 1974 depicting the communities of the South Wales valleys in a similar way to which Roberts had explored the slate communities of the North. The period has been described as one in which the historical novel flourished thanks to authors like Marion Eames (1921–2007) and Rhiannon Davies Jones (1921–2014), whose attention to detail and realism stood in stark contrast to the Historical Romances of earlier periods; both also frequently focused on the stories of women (both real and fictional) through periods in Welsh history that had previously been viewed only from a male perspective. T. Glynne Davies (1926–1988) was the author of Marged (1971), an epic novel describing multiple generations of the same family which was one of the longest written in Welsh since the 19th century. Owain Owain (1929–1993) was the author of Y Dydd Olaf (1968, but not published until 1976; 'The Last Day'), a dystopian science fiction which explores the relationship between man and technology. John Rowlands (1938–2015) produced cerebral, complex and challenging works, including Ienctid yw 'mhechod (1965; 'My Sin is Youth') which caused controversy at the time for depicting an adulterous relationship between a Minister and a member of his congregation. Eigra Lewis Roberts (born 1939) published her first novel, Brynhyfryd, in 1959 and would go on to be perhaps the most prolific of all Welsh novelists, having published over 30 as of 2025.

==== The Post-modern Welsh novel (1980s–2000s) ====
The flowering in the Welsh novel since the 1950s (see above) continued during the last part of the century and was marked by the introduction in 1978 of the Daniel Owen Memorial Pize, named after the 19th-century novelist (see above), awarded annually at each National Eisteddfod for "a novel of at least 50,000 words with a strong storyline". Although prizes had been awarded for novels at the Eisteddfod on a fairly regular basis since the 19th century, and the Prose Medal has been awarded to a (short) novel more often than not over its history, this award meant that for the first time there would be an annual award with consistent rules given for a novel in Welsh. The first winner was Alun Jones for Ac Yna Clywodd Sŵn y Môr ('And Then he Heard the Sea').

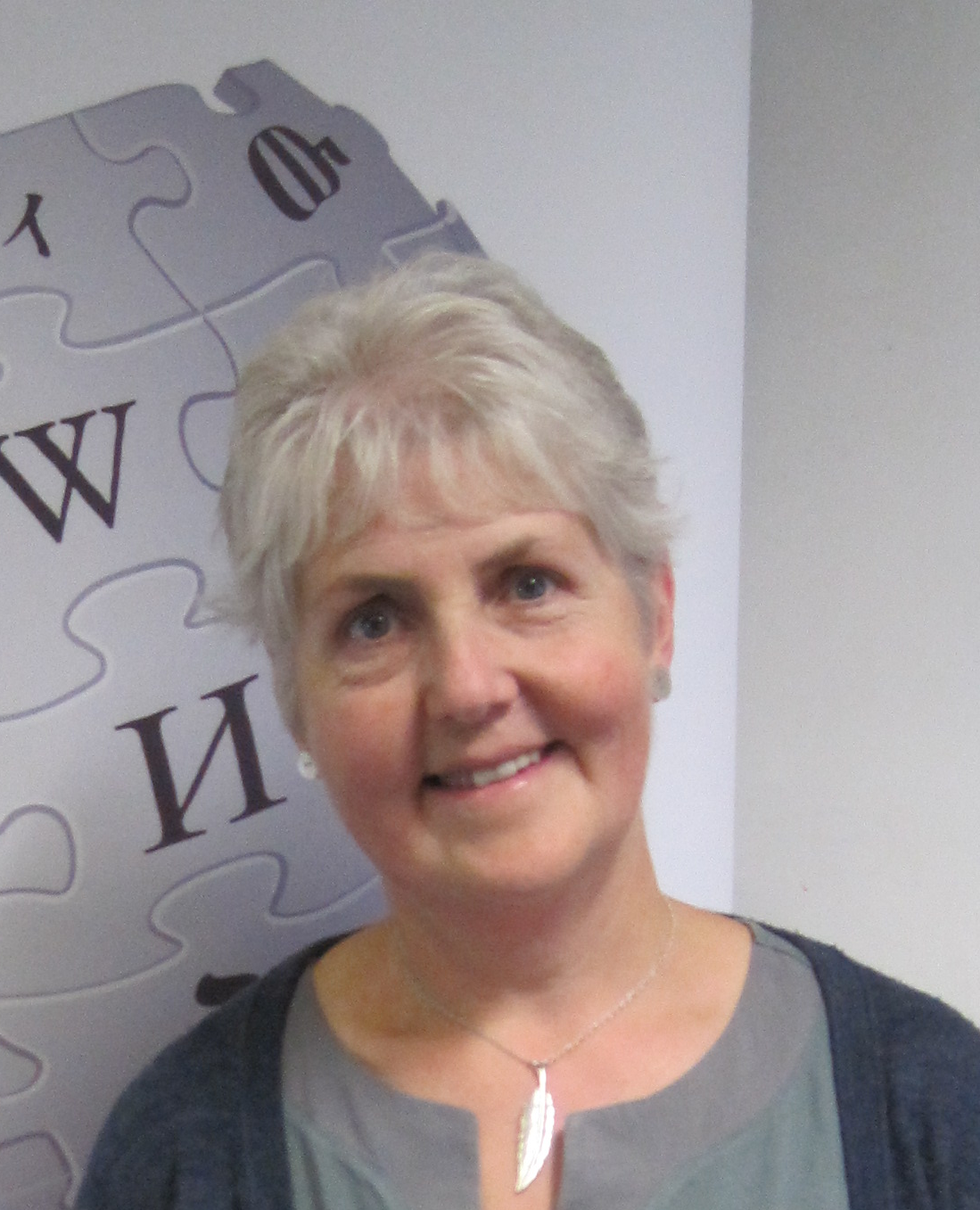
Angharad Tomos (born 1958), one of the major Welsh novelists to emerge during the 1980s.

Many of the novels of the 1980s showed a preoccupation with contemporary political matters. Prose Medal winners Y Tŷ Haearn (The Iron House'; 1983) by John Idris Owen (1937–2021) and Cyn Daw'r Gaeaf ('Before Winter Comes'; 1985) by Meg Elis (born 1950) both responded in very different ways to the threat of nuclear war: the former is a post-apocalyptic story depicting a group of characters locked inside a fallout shelter in the weeks after a nuclear assault, whilst the latter depicts the Greenham Common protests. The overtly feminist perspective of Elis's work was reflected in one of the most significant novelists in Welsh to emerge in the 1980s, Angharad Tomos (born 1958). In works like Hen Fyd Hurt ('Silly Old World'; 1983), Yma o Hyd ('Still Here', drawn from the title of the song; 1985) and Si Hei Lwli (1991) Tomos drew on her personal experience to explore feminine perspectives of unemployment and prison (she was briefly incarcerated for actions whilst protesting with Cymdeithas yr Iaith). She was also the author of Cyfres Rwdlan ('The Rwdlan Series'), the first of which, Rala Rwdins, was published in 1983 and which remains perhaps the best known and most popular original Welsh picture book series for young children.

The most obvious stylistic development over the 1980s and 1990s in Welsh prose was a trend towards post-modernism. This had been hinted at since the start of the decade in works like Sarah Arall ('Another Sarah'; Daniel Owen winner in 1980) by Aled Islwyn (born 1953) in which a child develops an obsession with fasting girl Sarah Jacob; if not even earlier in the work of Caradog Prichard and John Rowlands (see above) but was overt in the early work of William Owen Roberts (born 1953) such as Bingo! (1983), a re-working of the diaries of Kafka; and particularly Y Pla ('Pestilence'; 1985). Considered one of the major novels of the period in Welsh, it is a historical novel depicting the black death in Wales but with significant surrealist elements.

The trend was not without its critics: when the 1992 Prose Medal was won by Robin Llywelyn (born 1958) for Seren Wen ar Gefndir Gwyn ('A white star on a white background') some complained that the work was elitist and/or "un-Welsh". Depicting a war between fantasy countries but written entirely in the dialect of the Lleyn peninsula and replete with absurdist humour and slapstick, it is a complex novel that resists easy definitions. Variously described as an example of magical realism and fantasy, it has since been recognised one of the major works in Welsh of the 1990s and in the novel genre. Other writers whose work has been as post-modern include Gareth Miles (1938–2023) and Twm Miall, but perhaps the most prominent is Mihangel Morgan (born 1955). In novels and story collections like Dirgel Ddyn (1993; 'Secret Man'), Te gyda'r Frenhines (1994; 'Tea with the Queen'), Melog (1997) and Dan Gadarn Goncrit (1999; 'Under Hard Concrete') he explores often dark themes such as political corruption and serial killers. He is also a major voice in Queer literature in Welsh, and has come to be considered one of the leading novelists writing in the language.

Alongside these, a great number of new Welsh novelists emerged during the 1980s and 1990s and writing in a wide range of styles, including Harri Parri (born 1935), Geraint V. Jones (born 1938) Manon Rhys (born 1948), Eirug Wyn (1950–2004), Elgan Philip Davies (born 1952), Sonia Edwards (born 1961) and Dyfed Edwards (born 1966) among many others.

=== Late 20th-century drama ===
Alongside playwrights like Saunders Lewis and John Gwilym Jones who had emerged in the first half of the century, major voices in Welsh drama of the second half of the century included Gwenlyn Parry (1932–1991).

=== Children's literature ===
The trickle of writing for children in the first half of the 20th century (see above) became a steady stream in the second and a flood by the end (see below). Children growing up in Wales during the 1950s and 60s had access to a much wider quantity of reading material than their parents had had. Although comparatively few of the Welsh children's works produced during the 1950s and 1960s are well known today, a major exception is the work of T. Llew Jones (1915–2009). One of the most prolific writers in Welsh for children of any period, he would publish over fifty books for children over seven decades, including adventure and detective stories, poetry, and stories drawing on Welsh history and mythology; by the time of his death aged 93 in 2009 he would be regarded as "the premier children's author in Welsh" and a "national icon". He published his first book for children in 1958, Trysor Plas y Wernen ('The Treasure of Alder Place'), which would be followed by many more. Among his best known works are a trilogy about legendary Welsh highwayman Twm Siôn Cati – Y Ffordd Beryglus ('The Dangerous Road'; 1963), Ymysg Lladron ('Among Thieves'; 1965) and Dial o'r Diwedd ('Revenge at Last'; 1968); Barti Ddu (1973), about the pirate Bartholomew Roberts; Tân ar y Comin ('Fire on the Common'; 1975) about a Welsh Romany boy; and Lleuad yn Olau ('Full Moon'; 1989), a collection of stories drawn from Welsh mythology and folklore. Whilst such subjects had been employed by Welsh children's authors for decades, T. Llew Jones's efforts were differentiated by being free of didactic elements and his refusal to patronise his readers, as well as his rich prose; he had worked as a schoolteacher for many years and is often praised for possessing a deep understanding of his audience.

Although he likely will be remembered first and foremost as a children's author (and as a writer of poetry for children), T. Llew Jones was also an Eisteddfod poet who had won the chair twice at the end of the 1950s. It was notable that many significant literary figures in Welsh of the second half of the 20th century devoted at least some of their time to writing for children or young adults, including but not limited to Gwyn Thomas, Gerallt Lloyd Owen, Einir Jones, Angharad Tomos and Myrddin ap Dafydd; evidence that writing for children in Welsh was considered an activity of growing cultural import. Authors of note in the post-T. Llew Jones era include Dafydd Parri (1926–2001), author of the popular series Y Llewod ('The Lions'), which would eventually number 23 books initially appearing between 1975 and 1980 which depict a group of young friends who get involved in various adventures. Although bearing an obvious debt to Enid Blyton the series is thoroughly Welsh in character, idiom and cultural context. Parri was also the author of the 'Cailo' series, about a sheepdog. Irma Chilton (1930–1990) was another notable author of children's books in Welsh. The 1980s saw the publication of the first books in the Rwdlan series of picture books by Angharad Tomos (born 1958), one of the earliest and perhaps still the most popular original Welsh picture books for children. By the 1970s children's literature in Welsh began also to be supplemented by translations into Welsh of works such as the Tintin books by Hergé and the Narnia books by C. S. Lewis.

The establishment of the Tir na n-Og Award in 1975 showed the growing recognition of children's literature. By the 1990s, children's literature had become a major area of Welsh publishing. Authors writing extensively or mainly for children and/or teenagers included Mair Wynn Hughes (born 1930), Emily Huws (born 1942), Penri Jones (1943–2021) Siân Lewis (born 1945), John Owen (1952–2001), Bob Eynon (active 1990–2010), Elgan Philip Davies (born 1952) and Gareth F. Williams (1955–2016); among their output were not only novels, stories and pictures books, original and in translation, but gamebooks, non-fiction and books intended for learners.

== 21st century ==
=== Prose ===
The Welsh language novel has continued to thrive during the first decades of the twenty-first century. Despite a drop in readership mirroring trends across Western languages in response to the growing ubiquity of the internet and social media, Welsh publishing remains in comparatively rude health from a creative perspective, with the 2010s and 20s being described by various commentators as a 'renaissance' and a 'Golden Age' for the Welsh novel in particular.

==== Speculative and genre fiction ====
The possibilities of speculative fiction had remained relatively untapped by Welsh authors before the twenty-first century, with the examples mentioned above such as Wythnos yng Nghymru Fydd and Y Dydd Olaf being relatively rare. This began to change during the 21st century, especially after 2015. Dystopian and Post-apocalyptic fiction have proven particularly popular, with notable examples in the former including Talu'r Pris (2007) by Arwel Vittle, Gwales (2017) by Catrin Dafydd (born c. 1982) and Cymru Fydd (2022) by William Owen Roberts, and the latter including Y Dŵr ('The Water', 2007) by Lloyd Jones, Ebargofiant (2014) by Jerry Hunter (see below), Iaith y Nefoedd ('The language of Heaven' 2017) by Llwyd Owen and Llyfr Glas Nebo ('The Blue Book of Nebo,' 2018) by Manon Steffan Ros.

Welsh Authors have also explored fantasy, such as Alun Jones with his nordic-inspired trilogy Lliwiau'r Eira ('The Colours of Snow', 2013), Taith yr Aderyn ('The Bird's Journey', 2018) and Llwybr Gwyn yr Adar ('The Birds' White Path', 2024); Bethan Gwanas with her YA Melanai Trilogy (2017–19); Elidir Jones with the Chwedlau'r Copa Coch ('Tales of Red Mountain'), which started with Yr Horwth (2015); and Aled Emyr with Trigo (2024). These series are all notable for drawing on material from non-Welsh sources such as Nordic culture in the case of the Alun Jones trilogy, and the Copa Coch books owing an obvious debt to D&D. Other Welsh fantasy authors have drawn on material closer to home, such as Ifan Morgan Jones (born 1984) whose urban fantasy Dadeni (2017) draws on the Mabinogi, and whose steampunk novel Babel (2019) is set in 19th-century Wales; and Sioned Wyn Roberts with her novel Madws (2024) which draws on Welsh mythology but also folk medicine.

Horror is another genre which has received more attention by Welsh authors since 2000, with examples including Hen Bethau Anghofiedig ('Forgotten Things', 2018) by Mihangel Morgan (see above) and novels and short story collections by Peredur Glyn: Pumed Gainc y Mabinogi ('The Fifth Branch of the Mabinogi', 2022), Cysgod y Mabinogi ('The Shadow of the Mabinogi', 2024) and Anfarwol ('Immortal', 2025), a loosely connected series blending Welsh mythology with cosmic horror. Glyn acknowledges his debt to H. P. Lovecraft, whose stories he has also translated into Welsh.

Crime Fiction has been a particularly popular genre in Welsh with stand-alone novels such as Yr Argraff Gyntaf ('First Impression', 2010) by Ifan Morgan Jones but also a number of detective series with recurring characters. These include those featuring fictional detective Dela Arthur, beginning with Gwyn eu byd (2010) by Gwen Parrot (born 1955); and especially the series beginning with Dan yr Wyneb ('Under the Surface', 2012) by John Alwyn Griffiths, a former police officer whose series about fictional detective Jeff Evans numbers 14 books as of 2026. Cardiff-based Llwyd Owen (born 1977) is another popular writer of crime and thriller novels in Welsh. His novels, which include Ffawd, Cywilydd a Chelwyddau ('Fate, Shame & Lies', 2006), Ffydd Gobaith Cariad ('Faith Hope Love', 2006), Mr Blaidd ('Mr Wolf', 2009) Un Ddinas Dau Fyd ('One City Two Worlds', 2011) and Taffia (2016) are mostly set in Cardiff and address urban life in a way comparatively few Welsh-language novelists had previously done, addressing issues such as drug abuse and gang violence.

==== The 21st-century historical novel ====
Historical novels have been the chosen genre of some of the more ambitious novelists in Welsh of recent times. William Owen Roberts (born 1960), who had come to prominence in the 1980s for his post-modern historical novel Y Pla (see above) but had been silent in the 1990s began writing again in the new century, producing three ambitious historical novels in the form of Paradwys ('Paradise', 2001), depicting the colonial Caribbean, followed by Petrograd (2008) and its sequel Paris (2013) depicting a family fleeing the Russian Revolution. Roberts's work is notable for its strong political angle, with his most recent novel, Cymru Fydd (2022), being a semi-dystopian account of an independent Wales. Also of note is that Petrograd and Paris explore historical contexts with no direct connection to Wales itself; a fact also true of Awst in Anogia ('August in Anogeia', 2015) by Gareth F. Williams (1955–2016) which has been described as "a contender for Welsh book of the decade".

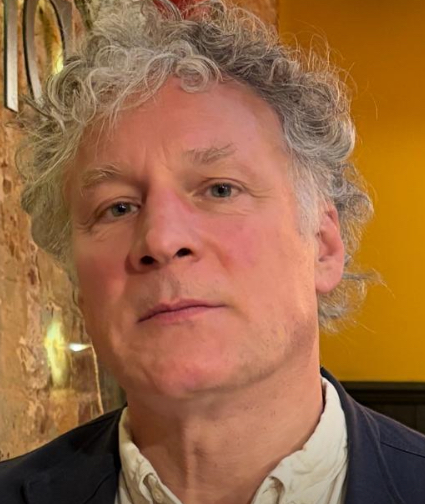
Jerry Hunter (born 1965), author of notable historical novels in Welsh.

Another author of ambitious historical novels in Welsh is Jerry Hunter (born 1965). Originally from Cincinnati, Ohio, Hunter has lived in Wales since the early 1990s and in his capacity as an academic has made important contributions in the understanding of the history and writing of the Welsh in America. As a novelist, much of his work engages in different ways with Welsh history and the Welsh literary tradition: he first came to prominence with Gwenddydd (2010), winner of the Prose Medal, ostensibly a novel about a brother and sister during the Second World War but in fact a retelling of the 13th century poem "Cyfoesi Myrddin a Gwenddydd ei Chwaer". This was followed by the progressively more ambitious Gwreiddyn Chwerw ('Bitter Root', 2012) and Y Fro Dywyll ('Dark Territory', 2014), set in the 19th and 16th centuries respectively, and culminating the sequence the epic-length Ynys Fadog (2018) about the Welsh in America which has been described as the "Welsh War and Peace" and alleged to be the longest Welsh novel ever written. Alongside these historical novels he has also explored post-apocalyptic fiction with Ebargofiant ('Oblivion', 2014), written in an original orthography reflecting hypothetical language shift after an environmental apocalypse, and alternate history with Safana (2021). Hunter has been described as a "boundary tester par excellence" and "a master at work", and his novels are regularly featured on lists of the greatest Welsh novels of the 21st century.

== See also ==
- Breton literature
- Cornish literature
- Dafydd ap Gwilym
- Four Ancient Books of Wales
  - Black Book of Carmarthen
  - Book of Taliesin
  - Book of Aneirin
  - Red Book of Hergest
- Geoffrey of Monmouth
- Iolo Morganwg
- List of Welsh-language authors
- List of Welsh-language poets
- List of Welsh writers
- Literature in the other languages of Britain
- Thirteen Treasures of the Island of Britain
- Welsh-language comics
- Welsh literature in English
- Welsh mythology
- Welsh Triads

== Notes ==
A.A distinction exists in Welsh between 'canu caeth' (literally 'chained verse' or 'bound verse') in cynghanedd and 'canu rhydd' ('free verse'), the latter referring to all poetry not in cynghanedd including what is referred to in English as free verse but also all other poetry not in cynghanedd regardless of form or metre, whether in native Welsh forms or imported forms such as the sonnet. Thus, what the Welsh refer to as 'canu rhydd' can in fact be quite strict by the standards of other literary traditions. For clarity, in this article the terms 'strict metres' and 'free metres' are used to refer to canu caeth and canu rhydd respectively, the term 'free verse' is avoided altogether and the French term 'vers libre' used, as it is sometimes used in Welsh, to refer to poetry without fixed line length, rhyming scheme or metrical pattern.
B.Although Griffiths lived most of her short life in the 18th century she wrote most of her poetry in the early years of the 19th.

== Sources ==
- Bowen, Geraint (1970). Y Traddodiad Rhyddiaith. Coleg Cymraeg Cenedlaethol. ISBN 978-1-909656-30-7.
- Boyd, Matthieu (3 August 2017). "Cynfeirdd". In Rouse, Robert; Echard, Sian; Fulton, Helen; Rector, Geoff (eds.). The Encyclopedia of Medieval Literature in Britain. Oxford, UK: John Wiley & Sons, Ltd. pp. 1–2. doi:10.1002/9781118396957.wbemlb647. ISBN 978-1-118-39695-7.
- Davies, John (2007). A History of Wales. Penguin Books. ISBN 978-0-14-028475-1.
- Edwards, Hywel Teifi (2000). A Guide to Welsh Literature: 1800–1900. University of Wales Press. ISBN 9780708316054.
- Edwards, Hywel Teifi (2016). The Eisteddfod. University of Wales Press.
- Ellrodt, Robert (25 May 2000). "George Herbert and Henry Vaughan". Seven Metaphysical Poets. pp. 127–141. doi:10.1093/acprof:oso/9780198117384.003.0008. ISBN 978-0-19-811738-4.
- Evans, Daniel Simon (1970). A Grammar of Middle Welsh. Dublin Institute for Advanced Studies.
- Evans, Geraint; Fulton, Helen (2019). The Cambridge History of Welsh Literature. Cambridge University Press. ISBN 978-1107106765.
- Ford, Patrick (1975). "The Poet as "Cyfarwydd" in Early Welsh Tradition". Studia Celtica. 10: 152. ProQuest 1297884980.
- Gruffydd, R. Geraint (1969). "'Yny Lhyvyr Hwnn (1546): The Earliest Welsh Printed Book". Bulletin of the Board of Celtic Studies. XXII: 105–116.
- Hallam, Tudur (2019). "The Legacy of Saunders Lewis". The Cambridge History of Welsh Literature. Cambridge University Press. pp. 507–528. doi:10.1017/9781316227206.028. ISBN 978-1-107-10676-5. S2CID 242196364.
- Hunter, Jerry (2007). "Llywelyn's breath, Arthur's nightmare: the medievalism within Welsh modernism". Cambrian Medieval Celtic Studies (53/54): 113–132. ISBN 9780952747857.
- Hutchison, Robert; Feist, Andrew (1991). Amateur Arts in the UK. London: Policy Studies Institute. p. 121. ISBN 9780853745334.
- Jarman, A. O. H.; Hughes, Gwilym Rees (1976). A Guide to Welsh Literature volume 1. Christopher Davies. ISBN 0-7154-0124-6.
- Jarman, A. O. H. (1981). The Cynfeirdd: early Welsh poets and poetry. Cardiff: University of Wales Press on behalf of the Welsh Arts Council. ISBN 0-7083-0813-9.
- Jenkins, Geraint H. (1999). 'Gwnewch Bopeth yn Gymraeg': Yr Iaith Gymraeg a'i Pheuoedd 1801–1911 (in Welsh). Cardiff: University of Wales Press. ISBN 0-7083-1573-9.
- Johnes, Martin (2024). Welsh Not: Elementary Education and the Anglicisation of Nineteenth-Century Wales. Cardiff University Press. ISBN 9781837721801.
- Johnson, Dale A. (2012). "In the Shadow of the Pulpit: Literature and Nonconformist Wales, by M. Wynn Thomas". Victorian Studies. 55 (1): 135–137. doi:10.2979/victorianstudies.55.1.135. ISSN 0042-5222. S2CID 144216028.
- Johnston, Dafydd (1994). The Literature of Wales. Cardiff: University of Wales Press. ISBN 0-7083-1265-9.
- Johnston, Dafydd (1998). A Guide to Welsh Literature c. 1900–1996. Cardiff: University of Wales Press. ISBN 0-7083-1424-4.
- Jones, R. M. (1988). Blodeugerdd Barddas o'r Bedwaredd Ganrif ar Bymtheg (in Welsh). Cyhoeddiadau Barddas.
- Koch, John C (2006). Celtic Culture: A Historical Encyclopaedia. ABC-CLIO. p. 827. ISBN 978-1-85109-440-0.
- Koch, John T.; Carey, John (1994), The Celtic Heroic Age: Literary Sources for Ancient Celtic Europe and Early Ireland and Wales, Malden, MA: Celtic Studies Publications, ISBN 978-0-9642446-2-7.
- Parry, John J. (1952). "The Court Poets of the Welsh Princes". PMLA. 67 (4): 511–520. doi:10.2307/459824. ISSN 0030-8129. JSTOR 459824. S2CID 163613768.
- Parry, Thomas (1955). A History of Welsh Literature, by Thomas Parry ... Translated from the Welsh by H. Idris Bell. Clarendon Press.
- Parry, Thomas (December 1964). Hanes Llenyddiaeth Gymraeg Hyd 1900. University of Wales Press. ISBN 978-0-7083-0291-0.
- Parry, Thomas; Morgan, Merfyn (1976). Llyfryddiaeth Llenyddiaeth Gymraeg: Without special title (in Welsh). Gwasg Prifysgol Cymru. ISBN 978-0-7083-0631-4.
- Phillips, Rhea Seren (2 August 2017). "Welsh Poetic Forms and Metre- A History". The Luxembourg Review.
- Rowland, Jenny, ed. (1990). Early Welsh Saga Poetry: A Study and Edition of the Englynion. Cambridge: D. S. Brewer. ISBN 9780859912754.
- Stephens, Meic (1986). Cydymaith i Lenyddiaeth Cymru (in Welsh). Gwasg Prifysgol Cymru. ISBN 978-0-7083-0915-5.
- Tanner, Marcus (2004). The Last of the Celts. Yale University Press. ISBN 978-0-300-11535-2.
- White, Donna R. (1996). "The Further Crimes of Lady Charlotte Guest". Proceedings of the Harvard Celtic Colloquium. 16/17: 157–166. ISSN 1545-0155. JSTOR 20557319.
- Williams, Ifor (1987). The Poems of Taliesin. Translated by Williams, J. E. Caerwyn. Dublin Institute for Advanced Studies.
- Williams, John Ellis Caerwyn (1994). The Poets of the Welsh Princes. University of Wales Press. ISBN 978-0-7083-1206-3.
- Williams, Katherine (1959). "Owen, Daniel (1836–1895), novelist". Dictionary of Welsh Biography. National Library of Wales.
- The New Companion to the Literature of Wales ([New, completely rev.] ed.). Cardiff: University of Wales Press. 1998. ISBN 0-7083-1383-3.
- A.D. 1535 Anno vicesimo septimo Henrici VIII c. 26 (The Laws in Wales Act 1535) (in Latin). Parliament of England. 1535.
