= 1912 in Wales =

- Centuries: 18th; 19th; 20th; 21st
- Decades: 1890s; 1900s; 1910s; 1920s; 1930s
- See also: List of years in Wales; Timeline of Welsh history 1912 in The United Kingdom Scotland Elsewhere

This article is about the particular significance of the year 1912 to Wales and its people.

== Incumbents ==
- Archdruid of the National Eisteddfod of Wales – Dyfed
- Lord Lieutenant of Anglesey – Sir Richard Henry Williams-Bulkeley, 12th Baronet
- Lord Lieutenant of Brecknockshire – Joseph Bailey, 2nd Baron Glanusk
- Lord Lieutenant of Caernarvonshire – John Ernest Greaves
- Lord Lieutenant of Cardiganshire – Herbert Davies-Evans
- Lord Lieutenant of Carmarthenshire – Sir James Williams-Drummond, 4th Baronet
- Lord Lieutenant of Denbighshire – William Cornwallis-West
- Lord Lieutenant of Flintshire – William Glynne Charles Gladstone
- Lord Lieutenant of Glamorgan – Robert Windsor-Clive, 1st Earl of Plymouth
- Lord Lieutenant of Merionethshire – Sir Osmond Williams, 1st Baronet
- Lord Lieutenant of Monmouthshire – Godfrey Morgan, 1st Viscount Tredegar
- Lord Lieutenant of Montgomeryshire – Sir Herbert Williams-Wynn, 7th Baronet
- Lord Lieutenant of Pembrokeshire – John Philipps, 1st Viscount St Davids
- Lord Lieutenant of Radnorshire – Powlett Milbank
- Bishop of Bangor – Watkin Williams
- Bishop of Llandaff – Joshua Pritchard Hughes
- Bishop of St Asaph – A. G. Edwards (later Archbishop of Wales)
- Bishop of St Davids – John Owen

== Events ==
- 9 February - Alfred Thomas is created Baron Pontypridd.
- 1 March - A national coal miners' strike begins, led in Wales by Vernon Hartshorn and Noah Ablett, among others.
- 15 April - Wireless operator Artie Moore of Gelligroes near Blackwood, hears a distress signal from RMS Titanic.
- 22 April - Denys Corbett Wilson leaves Goodwick, Pembrokeshire, to make the first manned flight fully across the Irish Sea in a time of 1 hour 40 minutes.
- 26 April - Vivian Hewitt of Bodfari in Denbighshire makes a manned flight across the Irish Sea, from Holyhead to Dublin.
- 28 May - A major demonstration in favour of disestablishment takes place in Swansea.
- 25 June - King George V and Queen Mary arrive for a 4-day visit to Cardiff onboard HMY Victoria and Albert (built Pembroke Dock 1899). On 26 June the royal couple lay the foundation stone of the National Museum Cardiff (it does not open to the public until 1927).
- 24 June - Sir David Brynmor Jones becomes a member of the Privy Council.
- 27 June - King George V and Queen Mary travel by train via Pontypridd for a controversial visit to Merthyr Tydfil.
- 1 August - Chemist Humphrey Owen Jones marries a colleague, Muriel Gwendolen Edwards. A fortnight later the couple, both keen climbers, are killed in a fall while on their honeymoon in the Alps.
- 17 September - Welsh immigrant workers play a major part in organizing the coal miners' strike in Vancouver Island, Canada.
- unknown dates
  - The Welsh Health Service Insurance Commission is established, under the National Insurance Act 1911
  - Dan yr Ogof caves are discovered by brothers Jeff and Tommy Morgan.
  - Sir Ellis Ellis-Griffith becomes chairman of the Welsh Parliamentary Liberal Party.
  - Clough Williams-Ellis receives his first major architectural commission, for the remodelling of Llangoed Hall.
  - First coal raised from Bedwas Navigation Colliery.
- 8A drill hall is built in the Pen-dre area of Tywyn for the Territorial Army (the 7th Battalion the Royal Welsh Fusiliers). The hall, subsequently known as Neuadd Pendre, is renovated 100 years after its construction with grants from various sources and houses a 3-manual 9-rank Wurlitzer Organ originally installed in a cinema in Woolwich.

== Arts and literature ==
- The Welsh colony in Chubut launches its own newspaper.

=== Awards ===
- National Eisteddfod of Wales - held in Wrexham
  - Chair and Crown - T. H. Parry-Williams (the first time both major prizes were won by the same person)

=== New books ===
==== English language ====
- Stanley Bligh - The Art of Conversation
- Rhoda Broughton - Between Two Stools
- A. G. Edwards - Landmarks in the History of the Welsh Church
- Miners' Unofficial Reform Committee - The Miners' Next Step
- T. M. Rees - Welsh Painters
- Bertha Thomas - Stranger Within The Gates (collection of short stories)

==== Welsh language ====
- Edward Tegla Davies - Hunangofiant Tomi
- Thomas Williams (Brynfab) - Pan Oedd Rhondda'n Bur

=== Music ===
- Thomas Carrington - Concwest Calfari
- Sir Henry Walford Davies - Song of St Francis (cantata)
- David Vaughan Thomas - A Song for St. Cecilia's Day

== Film ==
- The Belle of Bettws-y-Coed
- The Pedlar of Penmaenmawr
- The Smuggler's Daughter of Anglesea
- The Witch of the Welsh Mountains

== Sport ==
- Boxing:
  - January - Freddie Welsh dislocates his neck in a bout of wrestling, rendering him unable to compete.
  - 3 June - Jim Driscoll wins the European featherweight title.
  - 16 December - Freddie Welsh wins the Commonwealth lightweight title.
- Football
  - Cardiff City F.C. win the Welsh Cup - the first time a club from south Wales has done so.
  - Swansea Town play their first match at the Vetch Field.
- Rugby league - Ebbw Vale RLFC fold after five seasons, ending the first attempt to bring rugby league to Wales.
- Rugby union
  - 14 December - The South African touring team defeats Wales 3–0 at Cardiff Arms Park.
  - 26 December - Swansea RFC defeat the South African touring team 3–0 at St Helen's, Swansea.

== Births ==
- 17 January - J. E. Caerwyn Williams, academic (died 1999)
- 27 February - Joe Thomas, communist activist (died 1990)
- 3 March - Mary Keir, supercentenarian (died 2024)
- 5 March - Enoch Mort, footballer (died 1999)
- 17 March - Brenda Chamberlain, artist and poet (died 1971)
- 27 March - James Callaghan, English Labour politician, Prime Minister of the U.K., M.P. for Cardiff (died 2005)
- 29 April - Elvet Jones, Wales and British Lions rugby international (died 1989)
- 9 May - Evan Williams, jockey (died 2001)
- 29 May - David Jenkins, librarian of National Library of Wales (died 2002)
- 30 May - Hugh Griffith, actor (died 1980)
- 8 June - Billy Bassett, footballer (died 1977)
- 16 June - Enoch Powell, English Conservative politician, Welsh scholar (died 1998)
- 29 June - Valerie Davies, swimmer (died 2001)
- 17 July - John Williams, clergyman (died 2002)
- 1 September - Gwynfor Evans, Plaid Cymru politician (died 2005)
- 1 September - Eileen Rees, nurse (died 2008)
- 20 October - William R. P. George, solicitor and poet (died 2006)
- 15 November - Arthur Granville, footballer (died 1987)
- 20 November
  - Arthur Rees, Wales rugby international and police Chief Constable (died 1998)
  - Wilf Wooller, Wales rugby international and Glamorgan cricket captain (died 1997)
- 12 December - Daniel Jones, composer (died 1993)
- 13 December - Garfield Hopkin Hughes, academic (died 1969)
- 20 December - Sir Morien Morgan, aeronautics engineer (died 1978)

== Deaths ==
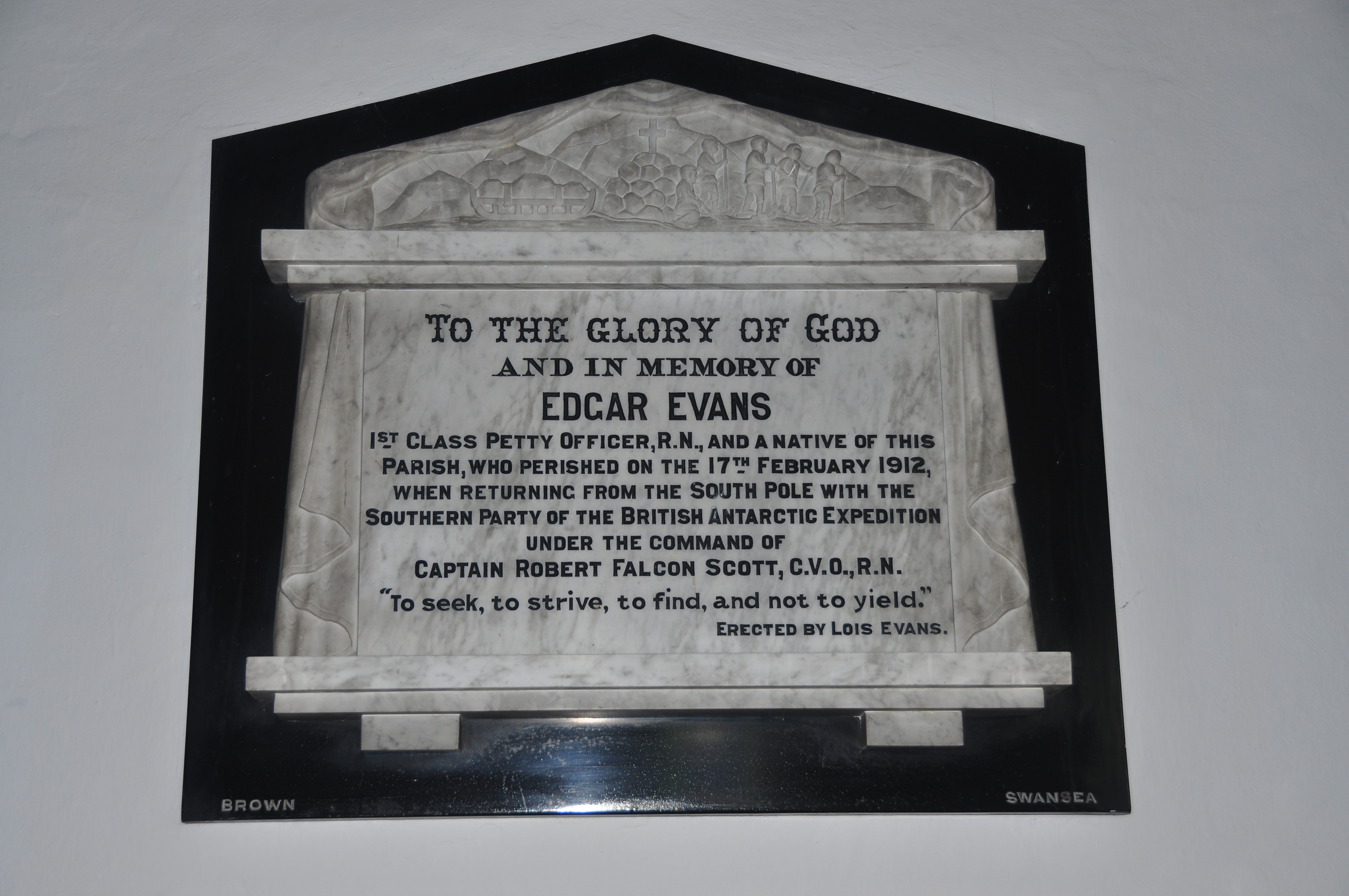
memorial to Edgar Evans, Rhossili

- 25 January – Augusta Mostyn, artist and philanthropist, 81
- 29 January – Dai Evans, Wales international rugby player
- 17 February – Edgar Evans, explorer, 35
- 6 April – Eleazar Roberts, writer and musician, 87
- 15 April – David John Bowen, boxer, 20 (sinking of the Titanic)
- 18 April – Walter Clopton Wingfield, lawn tennis inventor, 78
- 18 May – Richard Grosvenor, MP for Flintshire 1861–1886, 75
- 23 July – Abel Thomas, lawyer and politician, 63/64
- 25 July – Griffith John, missionary, 80
- 31 July – Ellis Pierce, writer and bookseller, 71
- 15 August - Humphrey Owen Jones, chemist, 34 (climbing accident)
- 29 August (in Haslemere) - James Cholmeley Russell, railway entrepreneur, 71
- 21 September – William T. Davies, Welsh-born Lieutenant Governor of Pennsylvania, 80
- 24 September – John Rolls, 1st Baron Llangattock, politician, 75
- 30 October – Walter W. Thomas, architect, 63
- 18 November – Edward Thomas (Cochfarf), local politician, 59
- 4 December – Phoebe Davies, actress, 48

== See also ==
- 1912 in Ireland
