= Tarian Rhyddid a Dymchwelydd Gormes =

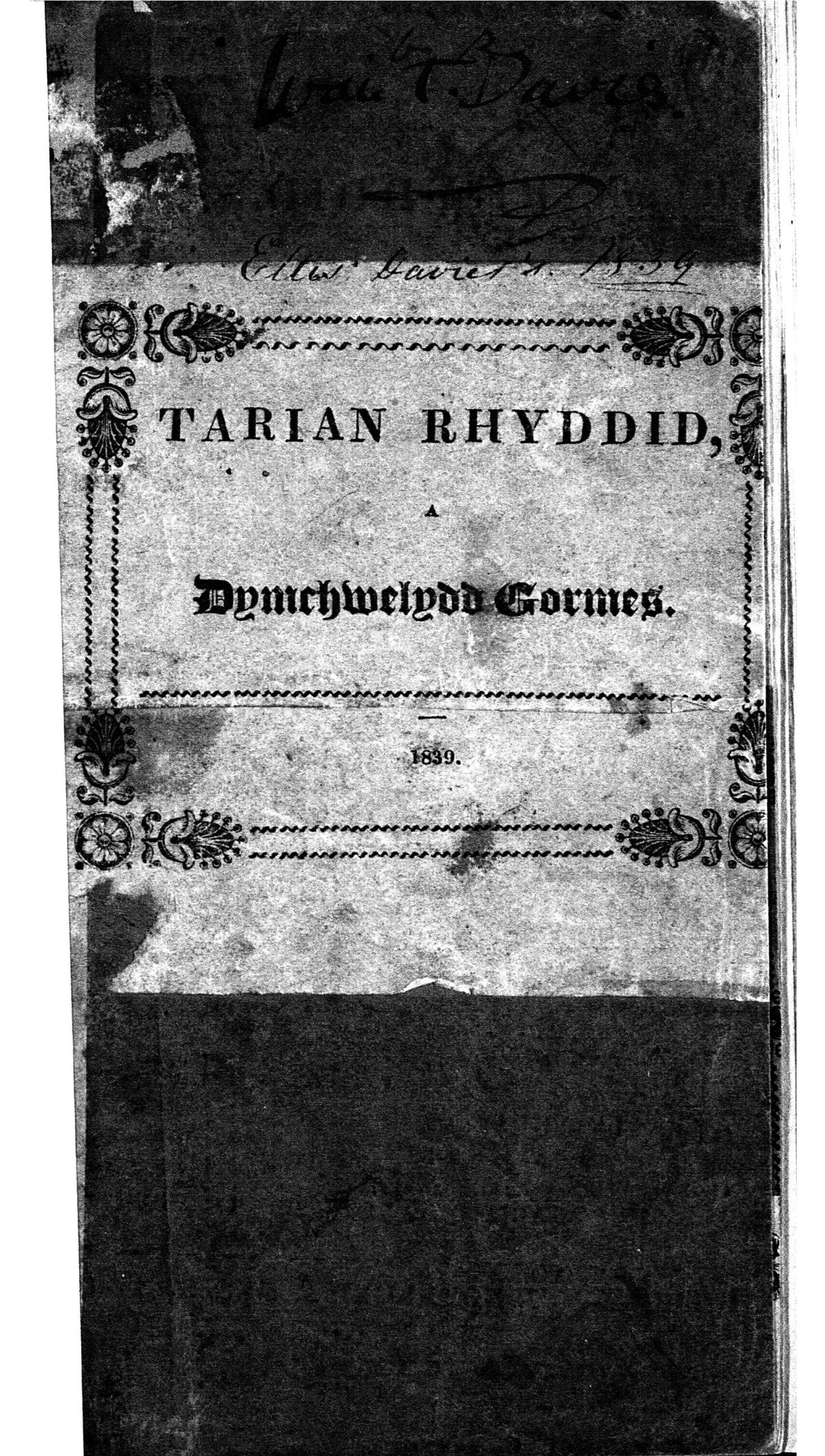
Tarian Rhyddid a Dymchwelydd Gormes

Tarian Rhyddid a Dymchwelydd Gormes ('The Shield of Freedom and Overthrower of Oppression') was a 19th-century Welsh-language periodical, produced for the Congregationalist Church by the ministers William Rees (Gwilym Hiraethog, 1802–1883), one of the major Welsh literary figures of the 19th century, and Hugh Pugh (1803–1868). It contained mainly articles which attacked the Established Church, and protested against its practices (such as the collection of tithes).
