= Gerallt Lloyd Owen =

Welsh-language poet (1944–2014)

Gerallt Lloyd Owen (6 November 1944 – 15 July 2014) was a Welsh-language poet who lived in Llandwrog. He is considered to be one of Wales's leading "strict-metre" poets.

== Works ==
Owen began as a "political poet" in the 1960s, often using medieval forms or imagery for purposes of promoting Welsh nationalism. His political works at times satirized the failings of the Welsh people, or Welsh history, rather than simply praising them.

The 1982 Bardic Chair at the National Eisteddfod of Wales was awarded to Owen for his awdl Cilmeri, which Hywel Teifi Edwards has called the only 20th-century awdl, that matches T. Gwynn Jones' 1902 masterpiece Ymadawiad Arthur ("The Passing of Arthur"). Owen's Cilmeri reimagines the death of Prince Llywelyn ap Gruffudd of the Royal House of Gwynedd in battle near the village of the same name on 11 December 1282, while leading a doomed uprising against the occupation of Wales by King Edward I of England. Owen's poem depicts the Prince as a tragic hero and invests his fall with an anguish unmatched since Gruffudd ab yr Ynad Coch wrote his famous lament for the Prince immediately following his death. Owen also, according to Edwards, encapsulates in the Prince's death the Welsh people's continuing "battle for national survival."

One of his earlier works, Afon, is more about childhood. Part of it is quoted in a document on early children's education in Wales.

== Death ==
Owen died on 15 July 2014 in hospital at the age of 69.

== Awards ==
- 1992 Wales Book of the Year winner, Welsh-language.
- 2002 Glyndŵr Award for literature.
