= Encyclopaedia Cambrensis =

The Encyclopaedia Cambrensis or Y Gwyddoniadur Cymreig was the most ambitious encyclopedia in the Welsh language. It was published in ten volumes between 1854 and 1879 by Thomas Gee on his press in the town of Denbigh, Gwasg Gee. The general editor was John Parry, Gee's brother in-law and lecturer at the College of Bala. It remains the largest paper publication in Welsh today.

The project cost for Gee was about £20,000 (equivalent to £2,600,000 in 2023).

== Description ==
The Encyclopaedia Cambrensis includes nearly 9,000 pages in double columns. While the number of articles relating to the Bible and theology is significantly higher than expected in such a reference work today, it also includes a large number of biographical articles, articles on Welsh history and literature, science, geography and other Celtic nations.

Among the numerous contributors were Owen Morgan Edwards and John Morris-Jones. The article that the latter contributed on the Welsh language was used as a basis for his A Welsh Grammar, Historical and Comparative.
