= Y Goeden Eirin =

Welsh-language short stories

Y Goeden Eirin (The Plum Tree) is a 1946 collection of six modernist Welsh-language short stories by John Gwilym Jones, which has been described as "a milestone in the development of the Welsh short story". It introduced Freudianism and the stream-of-consciousness technique to Welsh literature. It was published in English translation as The Plum Tree and Other Short Prose (2004).

== Contents ==
Contents of the English-language version, The Plum Tree and Other Short Prose (2004):

- The Craft of the Short Story
- Decline
- The Wedding
- The Plum Tree
- The Highest Cairn
- The Communion
- On the Mend
- The Steeping Stones
- Meurig
- Duty
- The Man from Groeslon
- Afterword [by Gwyn Thomas]

== Publication history ==
When Jones submitted his Welsh-language short stories to Gwasg Gee, a small Denbigh publishing house run by Kate Roberts and Morris Williams, they at first rejected them, but later reconsidered their decision and published them under the title Y Goeden Eirin in 1946.

Two of the stories were later anthologized in English versions. "Y Briodas", translated into English by Islwyn Ffowc Elis as "The Wedding", was included in Elis's and Gwyn Jones's Twenty-Five Welsh Short Stories (OUP, 1971), later reissued as Classic Welsh Short Stories (OUP, 1992). The title-story of Jones's collection, "Y Goeden Eirin" (The Plum Tree), appeared in Meic Stephens's A Book of Wales (Dent, 1987) in a translation by Elan Closs Stephens.

There is also an English translation by Meic Stephens of the complete Y Goeden Eirin together with extra material, including previously uncollected stories, an autobiographical sketch by Jones, the transcript of an interview in which Jones discussed the art of short-story writing, and a biographical and critical afterword by Gwyn Thomas. This book was published by Seren Classics in 2004 as The Plum Tree and Other Short Prose.

== Influences and themes ==
Y Goeden Eiren is perhaps Jones's most modernist work, and one which makes demands of its readers, notwithstanding Jones's belief that they "readers are often lazy, expecting to be given something in one reading". Jones was a self-consciously intellectual writer, and these stories display the influence of Marcel Proust, Virginia Woolf, James Joyce, and William Saroyan. They introduced Freudianism and stream-of-consciousness narrative to Welsh literature. Y Goeden Eiren is concerned on the one hand with cerebral ideas and on the other with sexual anxieties, including repressed homosexuality. Jones described his characters as being "the nouveau riche of the educational system"; they are concerned with philosophical ideas, with reason and faith, but the enlarged vision of the world they owe to their education is in conflict with their loyalty to their roots.

== Sources ==
- Morgan, Mihangel (2016). "From Huw Arwystli to Siôn Eirian: representative examples of cadi/queer life from medieval to twentieth-century Welsh literature". In Osborne, Huw (ed.). Queer Wales: The History, Culture and Politics of Queer Life in Wales. Cardiff: University of Wales Press. ISBN 978-1-78316-863-7.
- Reynolds, S. Rhian, ed. (2005). A Bibliography of Welsh Literature in English Translation. Cardiff: University of Wales Press. ISBN 0-7083-1882-7.
- Roberts, Dewi (n.d.). "Gwales Review". Gwales. Cyngor Llyfrau Cymru/Books Council of Wales.
- Tomos, Megan (2006). "Welsh prose literature [4] the short story". In Koch, John T. (ed.). Celtic Culture: A Historical Encyclopedia. Santa Barbara: ABC-CLIO. pp. 1784–1785. ISBN 978-1-85109-440-0.
