= List of public art in Conwy County Borough =

Map of Wales with Conwy highlighted

This is a list of public art in Conwy County Borough, Wales. Conwy County Borough (Welsh: Bwrdeistref Sirol Conwy) is a unitary authority area in North Wales and includes the town of Conwy. This list applies only to works of public art on permanent display in an outdoor public space and does not, for example, include artworks in museums.

== Abergele ==
Image	Title / subject	Location and coordinates	Date	Artist / designer	Type	Material	Dimensions	Designation	Wikidata	Notes
	War memorial	St Michael's Churchyard, Abergele			Celtic cross					
	Peace Stone	Pensarn Beach, Abergele	1995		Boulder	Stone				Erected to mark the anniversary of the end of World War II

== Capel Curig ==
Image	Title / subject	Location and coordinates	Date	Artist / designer	Type	Material	Dimensions	Designation	Wikidata	Notes
	War memorial	Capel Curig			Celtic cross on pedestal		2.1m high			

== Capel Garmon ==
Image	Title / subject	Location and coordinates	Date	Artist / designer	Type	Material	Dimensions	Designation	Wikidata	Notes
	War memorial	St Garmon's Church, Capel Garmon			Celtic cross on plinth	Stone				

== Colwyn Bay ==
Image	Title / subject	Location and coordinates	Date	Artist / designer	Type	Material	Dimensions	Designation	Wikidata	Notes
More images	War memorial	Conway Road, Colwyn Bay	1922	John Cassidy	Statue on pedestal	Bronze		Grade II	Q29492486	
	The Cormorant	West Promenade, Colwyn Bay	2021/2022	Small World Theatre	Sculpture	Metal, recycled materials and concrete		—N/a		
	Statue of Terry Jones	Colwyn Bay	2024–2026	Nick Elphick	Statue	Bronze		—N/a		Unveiled 25 April 2026, with his fellow Python Terry Gilliam in attendance, the statue shows Jones in character as "the nude organist".

== Conwy ==
Image	Title / subject	Location and coordinates	Date	Artist / designer	Type	Material	Dimensions	Designation	Wikidata	Notes
More images	Llywelyn the Great	Lancaster Square, Conwy	1898	Grayson & Ould, Liverpool; Edward O. Griffith, sculptor.	Statue, column, fountain	Painted bronze statue, stone column & fountain		Grade II	Q29483177	
	War memorial	Bodlondeb Park, Conwy	1921		Obelisk	Granite	1.5m high	Grade II	Q29507966	Moved from Castle Square after World War II.
More images	Mussel sculpture	The Quay, Conwy	2007	Graeme Mitcheson	Sculpture	Kilkenny limestone		—N/a		

== Dolgarrog ==
Image	Title / subject	Location and coordinates	Date	Artist / designer	Type	Material	Dimensions	Designation	Wikidata	Notes
	War memorial	Gardens of the British Legion Club, Dolgarrog	1927		Obelisk		3m high			

== Dolwyddelan ==
Image	Title / subject	Location and coordinates	Date	Artist / designer	Type	Material	Dimensions	Designation	Wikidata	Notes
	War memorial	Dolwyddelan	1922		Column and sphere	Stone				

== Llandudno ==
Image	Title / subject	Location and coordinates	Date	Artist / designer	Type	Material	Dimensions	Designation	Wikidata	Notes
More images	Queen Victoria	Happy Valley, Great Orme, Llandudno	1887		Bust, fountain and canopy	Stone		Grade II	Q29485153	
More images	War Memorial	South Parade, Llandudno	1922	Sidney Colwyn Foulkes	Obelisk	Granite	15.2m high	Grade II	Q29483324	
More images	The White Rabbit Memorial	West Shore, Llandudno	1933	Mr Forester (stonemason)	Statue	Stone		Grade II	Q29483356	Statue enclosed in anti-vandalism structure
More images	Kashmir goat	Bishop's Quarry Road, Llandudno	2002	Graham High	Sculpture on pedestal	Bronze				
	The White Rabbit	Vaughan Street, Llandudno	2012	Simon Hedger	Statue	Wood				
More images	The Mad Hatter	Glan Y Mor Parade, Llandudno	2012	Simon Hedger	Statue	Wood				
	Alice	Augusta Street, Llandudno	2012	Simon Hedger	Statue	Wood				
	Queen of Hearts	Gloddaeth Street, Llandudno	2012	Simon Hedger	Statue	Wood				
	The Cheshire Cat	Gloddaeth Avenue, Llandudno	2012	Simon Hedger	Sculpture	Wood				
	Welsh mountain pony	Llandudno		Sally Matthews	Sculpture	Metal				

== Llansannan ==
Image	Title / subject	Location and coordinates	Date	Artist / designer	Type	Material	Dimensions	Designation	Wikidata	Notes
More images	The Girl Tudur Aled William Salesbury Henry Rees William Rees (Gwilym Hiraethog) Edward Roberts (Iorwerth Glan Aled)	Llansannan	1899	Goscombe John	Statue, obelisk & plinth	Bronze statue		Grade II	Q29499309	Monument to several local poets and preachers.

== Llyn Crafnant ==
Image	Title / subject	Location and coordinates	Date	Artist / designer	Type	Material	Dimensions	Designation	Wikidata	Notes
	Llyn Crafnant Monument	Llyn Crafnant	1896		Obelisk					Erected by people of Llanrwst to mark the gift of land by Richard James

== Penmaenmawr ==
Image	Title / subject	Location and coordinates	Date	Artist / designer	Type	Material	Dimensions	Designation	Wikidata	Notes
	William Gladstone	Paradise Road, Penmaenmawr	1899, bust replaced 1991	Pete London	Bust on obelisk	Bronze and granite		Grade II		
