= Eleazar Roberts =

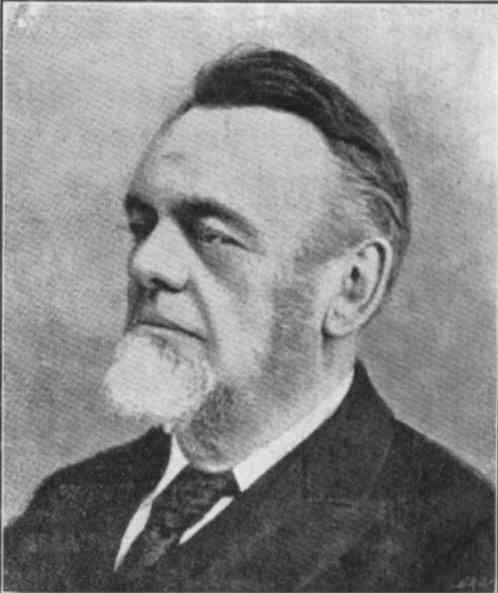
Eleazar Roberts

Eleazar Roberts (15 January 1825 – 6 April 1912), sometimes also spelt Eleazer, was a Welsh musician, translator, writer and amateur astronomer. Roberts's family moved to Liverpool in England while he was an infant, but despite this he retained a strong link to his country of birth and was a fluent Welsh speaker. He wrote for several Welsh journals and travelled Wales, setting up music classes. He is most notable for pioneering the tonic sol-fa method of sight-singing in Wales, which in turn led to the strengthening of the practice of congregational singing.

== Life history ==
Roberts was born in Pwllheli, Caernarfonshire in 1825 to John and Margaret Roberts, but only two months after his birth, the family moved to Liverpool. He grew up in Liverpool and was educated at several schools in the town including the Liverpool Institute High School for Boys. At the age of 13 he found work in a solicitor's office. In 1853 he became a full member of staff in the office of the clerk to the Liverpool magistrates before reaching the position of chief assistant to the clerk to the stipendiary magistrate. He retained the role of chief assistant until his retirement in 1894, and the following year he was made a justice of the peace. He died in 1912 and was buried at Anfield Cemetery.

=== Literary work ===
Roberts wrote for several Welsh journals throughout his life, most notably Yr Amserau, for which he wrote a weekly article under the pseudonym 'Meddyliwr'. As well as his weekly article he was also published in Y Drysorfa, Y Geninen and Y Traethodydd. He wrote two books in the English language, Owen Rees: a story of Welsh life and thought (1893) a novel about life in a Welsh community in Liverpool, and a biography on Welsh politician Henry Richard.

=== Musical work ===
Roberts travelled throughout Wales establishing singing classes. He was also a pioneer of the tonic sol-fa method of sight-singing in Wales, having adapted and translated into Welsh, the works of John Curwen. His most important publication on the topic was Llawlyfr y Tonic Solffa, a handbook which was designed to help in the teaching of the tonic sol-fa method. Other musical works in Welsh from Roberts include Llawlyfr Caniadaeth, Llawlyfr i ddarllen yr Hen Nodiant and Hymnau a Thonau.

He was also precentor at Netherfield Road Calvinist Methodist chapel in Liverpool, and along with John Edwards he conducted the first Welsh singing festival held in Liverpool, in 1880.

=== Astronomical work ===
Roberts was an amateur astronomer, but is notable in Welsh astronomy for translating The Solar System by prominent Scottish astronomer, Dr Thomas Dick, from English into the Welsh language. He wrote many essays in Welsh journals on astronomy, including several pieces in Y Traethodydd under the title 'The Telescope and its Discoveries'. He had an observatory in Hoylake and was friends with prominent astronomer Dr Isaac Roberts, who like Roberts was born in Wales, but grew up in Liverpool.
