= The Poet's Burial for Love =

15th-century Welsh poem

"The Poet's Burial for Love" (Welsh: Claddu'r Bardd o Gariad or Claddu y Bardd o Gariad) or "The Poet's Burial" (Welsh: Angladd y Bardd) is a Welsh-language love poem in the form of a cywydd in which the poet foresees his own death from unrequited love. It was formerly attributed to the 14th-century Welsh poet Dafydd ap Gwilym, but in 1952 was rejected from the canon of his works by Dafydd's editor, Thomas Parry and is now widely considered to be a 15th-century poem of uncertain authorship. The poem has nevertheless remained popular with translators and it continues to appear in anthologies, including Thomas Parry's own Oxford Book of Welsh Verse.

== Synopsis ==
The poet addresses a beautiful woman whom he has loved for a long time, and warns her that if he dies for love of her she will be guilty of his murder. He will then be buried among the woodland trees, his body adorned with flowers, leaves and clover, and eight branches will form his bier. Seagulls will carry his pall, trees follow his body, with two nightingales for statues. There a woodland choir, who have learned their Latin grammar from books of leaves, will sing, and the hayfield's organ and bells will sound. The grave is ready for him in Gwynedd, where the cuckoo will chant Masses for his soul, sounding like an organ, a visitation of love in the summer months. May God keep his tryst with the poet in Paradise!

== Manuscripts ==
"The Poet's Burial for Love" survives in 11 manuscripts, a comparatively small number for a poem attributed to Dafydd ap Gwilym. They are mostly rather late, dating from the 17th and 18th centuries, with the exception of National Library of Wales MS Brogyntyn 1, which can be dated to c. 1553.

== Attribution ==
The manuscripts of "The Poet's Burial for Love" all attribute it to Dafydd ap Gwilym. The earliest of them also has a marginal note stating that one Llywelyn ap Gruffydd ap Ieuan wrote it, but this may simply mean that he was the copyist. The poem was included in the 1789 collection of Dafydd's works, Barddoniaeth Dafydd ab Gwilym, and was attributed to Dafydd in a selection of cywyddau edited by Ifor Williams and Thomas Roberts in 1914, but in the mid-20th century Thomas Parry excluded it from his edition, citing the poem's imperfect cynghanedd (the strict alliteration required in the classical Welsh metres). Parry also considered that it had a less elaborate style than Dafydd's authentic works, indicating a more recent date; he assigned it to the 15th century without suggesting any alternative author. The recent Dafydd ap Gwilym.net edition similarly classifies this poem as apocryphal. Nevertheless, the canon of Dafydd's works has not been finally settled, and many scholars would be in favour of reattributing "The Poet's Burial" to him. The poet Giles Watson, noting the unanimity of the manuscript attributions, has pointed to the poem's lightness of touch and self-mockery as being characteristic of his work, and notes that it shares its theme of birds celebrating religious sacraments with Dafydd's poem "The Woodland Mass".

== Analogues ==
The Celticist Rachel Bromwich pointed out that the theme of birds singing at the funeral of a poet who died from love appears in three Old French poems, and that birdsong is metaphorically described as "Latin" in the Roman de la Rose and other French poems of the period. One of them, Li Fablel dou Dieu d'Amors, combines both features. There are also medieval paintings that depict birds conducting funerals, which the scholar D. J. Bowen has suggested may be a source of the poem.

== Musical settings ==
This poem was set to music by the composer David Vaughan Thomas as part of his song-cycle Saith o ganeuon ar gywyddau Dafydd ap Gwilym ac eraill.

== English translations and paraphrases ==
- Anonymous (1 October 1873). "The Poems of Dafydd ab Gwilim". The Westminster and Foreign Quarterly Review. 100 (198): 380–381.
- Bell, H. Idris, in Bell, H. Idris; Bell, David (1942). Fifty Poems. Y Cymmrodor, vol. 48. London: Honourable Society of Cymmrodorion. pp. 221, 223, 225. With the Middle Welsh original in parallel text.
- Conran, Anthony; Williams, J. E. Caerwyn, eds. (1967). The Penguin Book of Welsh Verse. Harmondsworth: Penguin. pp. 159–60.
- Fulton, Helen, ed. (1996). Selections from the Dafydd ap Gwilym Apocrypha. Llandysul: Gomer Press. pp. 68, 70. ISBN 185902310X. With the Middle Welsh original in parallel text.
- Gruffydd, W. J. (1935). Dafydd ap Gwilym. Caerdydd: Gwasg Prifysgol Cymru. pp. 75, 77. Abridged translation.
- Gurney, Robert, ed. (1969). Bardic Heritage. London: Chatto & Windus. pp. 109–111. ISBN 0701113286.
- Heseltine, Nigel, ed. (1968) [1944]. Twenty-Five Poems by Dafydd ap Gwilym. Banbury: Piers Press. pp. 26–27. ISBN 9780950355801.
- Humphries, Rolfe (1969). Nine Thorny Thickets. Kent, Ohio: Kent State University Press. pp. 64–65. ISBN 9780873380393.
- Johnes, Arthur James (1834). Translations into English Verse from the Poems of Davyth ap Gwilym. London: Henry Hooper. pp. 33–35.
- Jones, William Lewis, ed. (1915). The Land of My Fathers: A Welsh Gift Book. London: Hodder & Stoughton. pp. 56–57.
- Watson, Giles (2014). Dafydd ap Gwilym: Paraphrases and Palimpsests. Lulu.com. pp. 182–183. ISBN 9781291866803.
