= Lewis Edwards =

Welsh educator and Nonconformist minister (1809–1887)

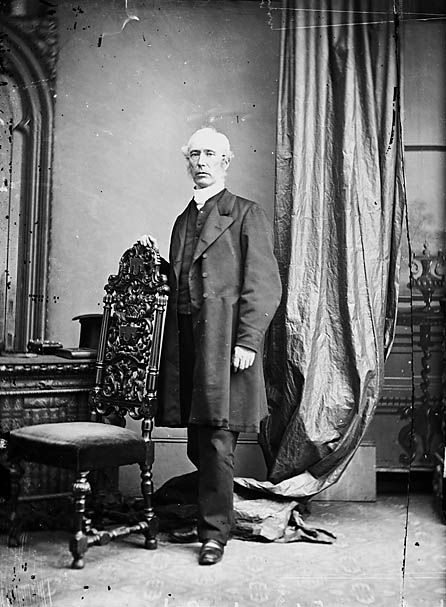
Photographic portrait by John Thomas (c. 1875)

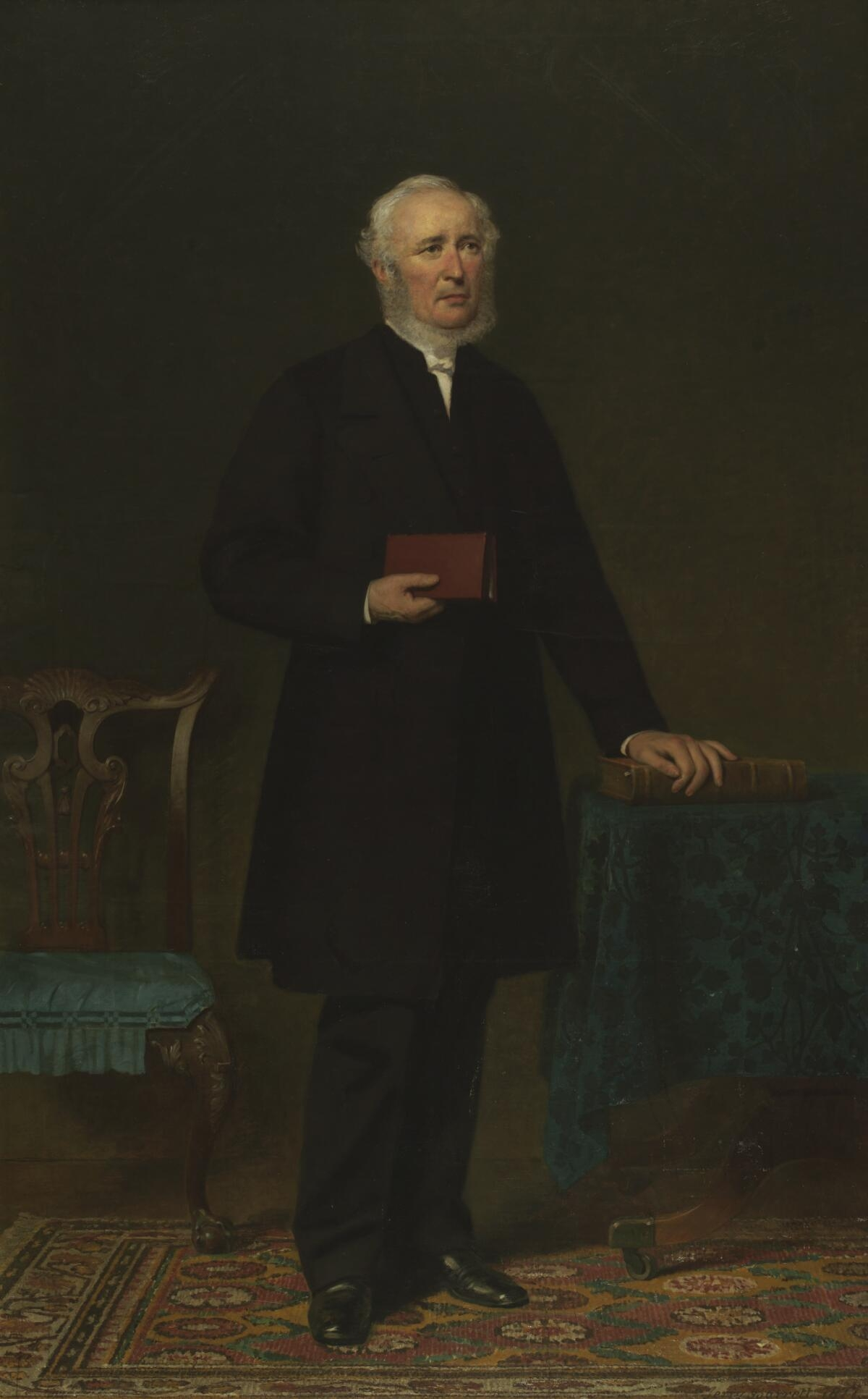
Portrait by Jerry Barrett (1877)

Lewis Edwards (27 October 1809 – 19 July 1887) was a Welsh educator and Nonconformist minister.

== Life ==
He was born in Pen-llwyn, Ceredigion, Wales, the eldest son of Lewis and Margaret Edward. He was educated at Aberystwyth and at Llangeitho. He ran schools in both these places and then became private tutor to a family in Meidrim, Carmarthenshire.

He had preached for the Calvinistic Methodists and, in 1829, was accepted as a regular preacher by the Calvinistic Methodist congregation at Llangeitho. In 1830 he was accepted for study at the Seceders' College, Belfast, but chose instead to study in London, at a college which later became University College London. After one year in London he became a minister and schoolteacher in Laugharne, Carmarthenshire. in 1833 he went to Edinburgh University, where he studied under Thomas Chalmers and Christopher North. By a special dispensation he graduated after three years instead of the usual four, obtaining an MA with honours. He was awarded an honorary D.D. by the University of Edinburgh in 1865.

He was now better able to further his plans for providing a trained ministry for his church. Previously, the success of the Methodist preachers had been due mainly to their natural gifts. Edwards made his home at Bala, and there, in 1837, with David Charles, his brother-in-law, he opened a school, which ultimately, as Bala College, became the denominational college for north Wales.

In 1836 he married Jane Charles, the granddaughter of Thomas Charles (1755–1814), a prominent Calvinistic Methodist minister. Their son Thomas Charles Edwards became the first principal of the University College of Wales, Aberystwyth.

He died on 19 July 1887, and was buried in Llanycil churchyard near the grave of his grandfather-in-law Thomas Charles.

== Influence ==
Edwards may fairly be called one of the makers of modern Wales. Through his hands there passed generation after generation of preachers, who carried his influence to every corner of the principality. By fostering competitive meetings and by his writings, especially in Y Traethodydd, a quarterly magazine which he founded in 1845 and edited for ten years, he did much to inform and educate his countrymen on literary and theological subjects. A new college was built at Bala in 1867, for which he raised £10,000. His chief publication was a noteworthy book on the doctrine of the Atonement, cast in the form of a dialogue between master and pupil; the treatment is forensic, and emphasis is laid on merit. It was due to him that the North and South Wales Calvinistic Methodist Associations united to form an annual General Assembly; he was its moderator in 1866 and again in 1876. He was successful in bringing the various churches of the Presbyterian order into closer touch with each other, and unwearying in his efforts to promote education for his countrymen.

== Publications ==
Edwards was closely involved with several magazines and periodicals. He was editor of Yr Esboniwr and assistant editor of Y Geiniogwerth. In 1845 he founded Y Traethodydd together with Roger Edwards and Thomas Gee.

His published books included:

- Athrawiaeth yr Iawn
- Traethodau Llenyddol
- Traethodau Duwinyddol
- Hanes Duwinyddiaeth
- Person Crist

Edwards wrote several influential essays, including:

- Schools of languages for the Welsh (1849)
- Revisers of hymns (1850)
- Goethe (1851)
- Welsh poetry (1852)
- Goronwy Owen (1876)

He translated several English hymns into Welsh.

== Sources ==
- Stephen, Leslie, ed. (1889). "Edwards, Lewis" . Dictionary of National Biography. Vol. 17. London: Smith, Elder & Co.
