= John Hughes (minister, 1796–1860) =

Welsh Calvinistic Methodist minister

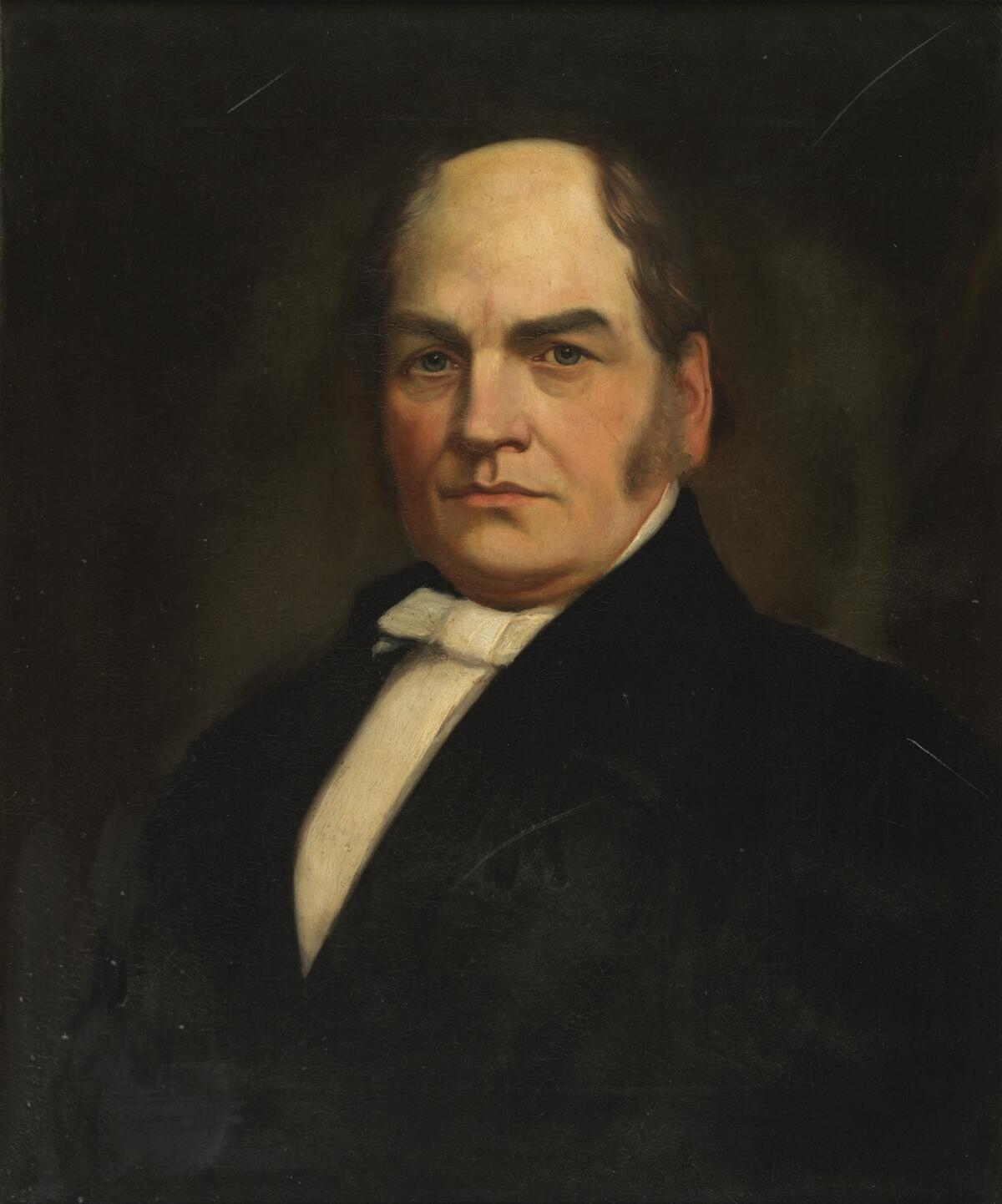
- Born: 11 February 1796
- Died: 8 August 1860 (aged 64)
- Occupation: Calvinistic Methodist minister

John Hughes (11 February 1796 – 8 August 1860) was a Welsh Calvinistic Methodist minister.

== Biography ==
Hughes was born at Adwy'r Clawdd, near Wrexham, on 11 February 1796. His parents were Hugh and Mary Hughes. His father was a carpenter, and he himself followed the same occupation till he was nineteen. When a lad of twelve he joined the Sunday-school which was then introduced into the neighbourhood, and made great progress. In 1810 he joined the Calvinistic Methodist church at Adwy, and three years later began preaching. On 13 September 1815 he opened a school at Cross Street, near Hope, Flintshire, but in August 1817 he went to school himself to learn Latin and Greek. After a time he opened a new school at Wrexham, and prepared many young men for the pulpit. He preached every Sunday. In February 1821 he was authorised as regular preacher to visit all parts of Wales, and in 1822 he preached before the Methodist Association. On 17 June 1829 he was ordained at Bala. In 1835, owing to bad health, he gave up his school, and became a flour merchant, in partnership with a brother. In 1838 he went to Liverpool, attained considerable eminence there as a preacher, and became co-pastor with Henry Rees of the Welsh Calvinistic churches of Liverpool. He died on a visit to Abergele 8 August 1860. He was twice married.

Hughes's chief work is his 'History of Welsh Calvinistic Methodism,' in three large volumes (Wrexham, vol. i. 1851, vol. ii. 1854, vol. iii. 1856). A volume containing twenty-two sermons, together with a memoir by the Rev. R. Edwards and the Rev. John Hughes of Everton, and a portrait, appeared in 1862. Other works (all in Welsh, and nearly all published at Wrexham without date) are:

'Companion to Scripture.' 'Mirror of Prophecy' (reviewed in 'Drysorfa,' March 1849). 'The Scripture Test.' 'Catechism of Scripture History' (reviewed in 'Drysorfa,' January 1850). 'Protestantism in Germany,' London, 1847. 'An Essay on the Sabbath,' 1859. He also translated several works for the Religious Tract Society.
