= John Parry (editor) =

Welsh editor

John Parry (23 March 1812 – 19 January 1874) was a Welsh editor and professor, remembered mainly as chief editor of the Encyclopaedia Cambrensis. He was the son-in-Law of Thomas Gee, the publisher of the encyclopedia.

== Biography ==
Parry was born in Wrexham in 1812. He was educated at Coleg y Bala and at the University of Edinburgh. In 1843 he was appointed professor at the College of Bala. He remained there for most of the rest of his life.

As stated above, Parry is chiefly remembered as the editor of the Encyclopaedia Cambrensis, the most ambitious encyclopedia in the Welsh language. Edited by Parry until his death, it was published in ten volumes between 1854 and 1879 by Thomas Gee on his famous press in Denbigh.
