= Pryse's Cambrian Book Register =

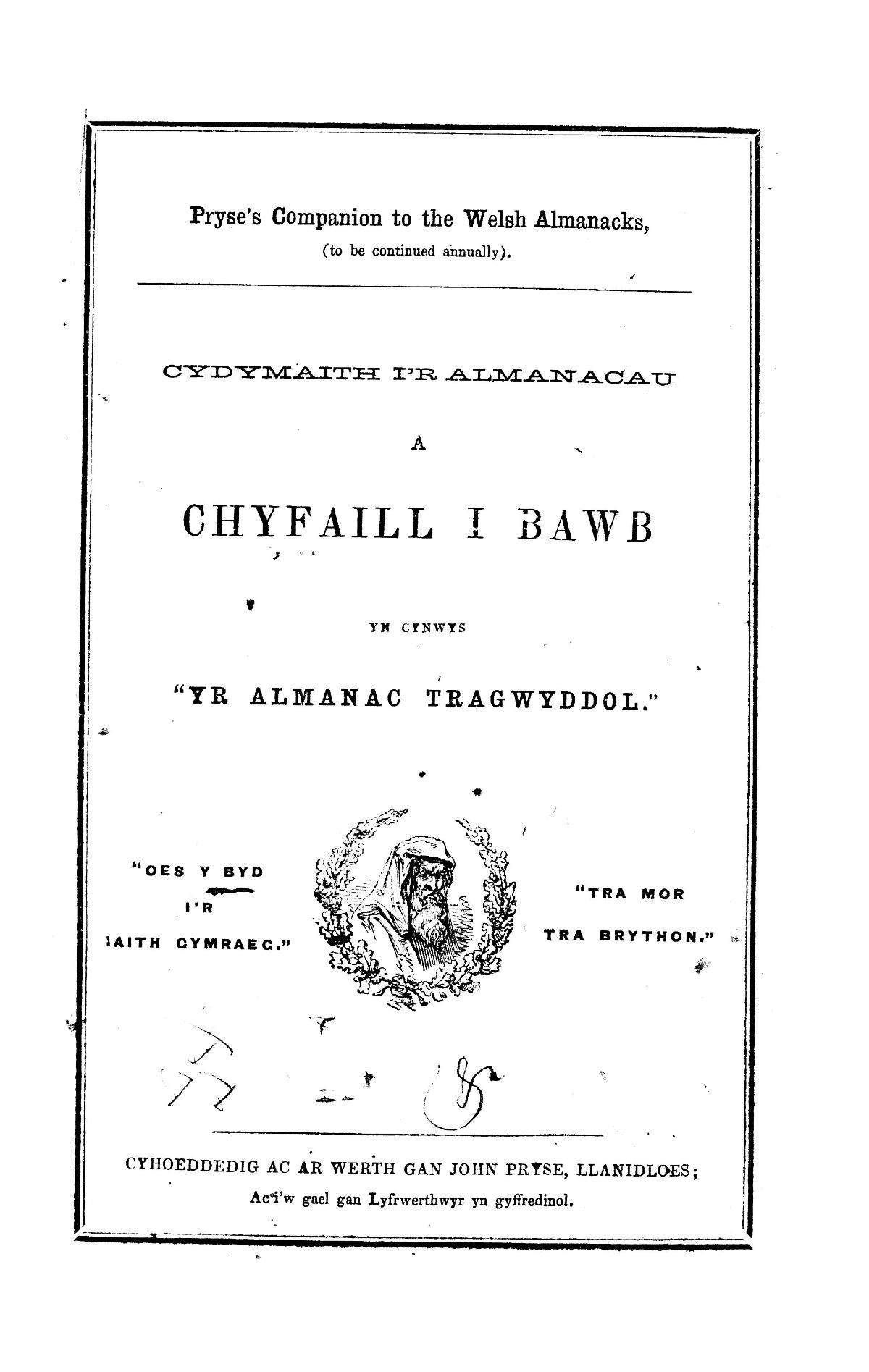
Pryse's Cambrian book register (Welsh Journal)

Pryse's Cambrian Book Register was a 19th-century bilingual (Welsh and English language) periodical, first produced by bookseller and printer John Pryse (1826-1883) in Llanidloes in 1857.

Only one edition of the Register was ever published. However, the aim of the periodical was to create a register of all Welsh books and books of Welsh interest, as well as a list of books sold by Pryse himself. This was perhaps the first attempt at creating a complete record of published Welsh language literature.
