= John Gwilym Jones =

Welsh dramatist (1904–1988)

- Born: John William Jones; 27 September 1904; Groeslon, Caernarvonshire
- Died: 16 October 1988 (aged 84); Ysbyty Gwynedd, Bangor, Gwynedd
- Resting place: Llandwrog, Gwynedd
- Citizenship: British
- Education: University College of North Wales
- Occupations: Dramatist, novelist, short-story writer, drama director, academic, critic
- Writing career
- Language: Welsh
- Period: 1934–1979
- Notable works: Y Goeden Eirin, Hanes Rhyw Gymro, Ac Eto Nid Myfi, Yr Adduned, Tri Diwrnod ac Angladd
- Literary movement: Modernism

John Gwilym Jones (27 September 1904 – 16 October 1988) was a Welsh dramatist, novelist, short-story writer, drama director, academic and critic, considered a pre-eminent figure in those fields. In particular, he is widely acknowledged to be one of the two greatest 20th-century Welsh playwrights, along with Saunders Lewis; of his many plays, Hanes Rhyw Gymro (1964), Ac Eto Nid Myfi (1976) and Yr Adduned (1979) are considered masterpieces. Almost all of his work was written in the Welsh language. A writer in the modernist tradition, he is credited with introducing Brechtian techniques, stream-of-consciousness narrative and Freudianism to Welsh literature. Creative writers such as Kate Roberts and John Rowlands owed him a profound debt, and a whole generation of critics were influenced by his work as a teacher of Welsh literature.

== Youth ==
Jones was born John William Jones on 27 September 1904 in the village of Groeslon, near Caernarfon in north Wales, the only child of Griffith Thomas Jones, a stonemason, and his wife Jane. He was to live in Groeslon for the greater part of his life. He was schooled in Penfforddelen (near Groeslon) and Penygroes, and matriculated at University College of North Wales in 1922. There the scholar Ifor Williams persuaded him to change his middle name to Gwilym.

== Teacher and critic ==
In 1926 Jones moved to London to take up a teaching post, then returned to Wales to teach in Llandudno (1930–1944), Pwllheli (1944–1948) and Penygroes (1948–1949). In 1953 he took up a post as lecturer, later reader, in the Welsh Department of his old college in Bangor, before finally retiring from academic life in 1971. Two years later the University of Wales awarded him an honorary D.Litt. He was an eminent and influential critic, publishing studies on, among other subjects, Daniel Owen, William Williams Pantycelyn, and the arts of writing and criticism.

== Dramatist ==
While working in London in the 1920s Jones developed an interest in drama and became an avid West End theatregoer. He turned to writing plays, the first two of which to be published were Y Brodyr (1934) and Diofal yw Dim (1942). From 1949 to 1953 he worked for the BBC in Bangor as a producer of radio plays. Some of his own shorter plays were originally intended for radio or television; they are collected in Pedair Drama (1971). He also helped to start up Theatr Fach Eryri, one of the more influential Welsh theatre companies of the 1960s. As a drama director working with this and other amateur companies he is said to have been very accomplished in drawing out excellent performances from inexperienced actors. In 1958 he published two linked plays under the title Lle Mynno'r Gwynt a Gŵr Llonydd, and in 1963 Y Tad a'r Mab, a technically experimental play treating of obsessional family love. Hanes Rhyw Gymro (1964), Jones's only historical drama, dealt with the 17th-century Puritan writer Morgan Llwyd. Cilwg yn Ôl (1965) is a translation of John Osborne's Look Back in Anger, one of many plays he rendered into Welsh. Three one-act plays by Jones were published as Rhyfedd y'n Gwnaed in 1976, and in Jones's own English translation, One Wedding, Two Rooms, Three Friends, were successfully produced off-Broadway by the Manhattan Theatre Club. Ac Eto Nid Myfi (1976) has been described as "a masterpiece of the modern Welsh theatre", containing "the quintessence of his philosophy and skill as a dramatist"; its theme is the necessity of every man to come to terms with his environment and culture, the factors which have created him. His final play was Yr Adduned (1979).

Jones was a keen observer of advances in the techniques of contemporary European theatre. He was the first Welsh-language dramatist to entirely reject naturalistic staging and to use alienation techniques. His plays display his understanding of the common people of his native Arfon, and of their ways of thinking and speaking. His characters are generally intelligent, literate and self-aware.

== Novelist and short-story writer ==
Y Dewis (1942) was Jones's first published novel. It was followed in 1946 by his acclaimed volume of short stories Y Goeden Eirin (translated in 2004 as The Plum Tree and Other Short Prose), which has been called "a milestone in the development of the Welsh short story" for its introduction of Freudianism and stream-of-consciousness narrative to Welsh literature. His second novel, Tri Diwrnod ac Angladd (1979), is said to be the more impressive of the two. It deals with the complications of family life, and makes much use of symbolism.

== Published works ==
All are in Welsh unless otherwise stated.

- Y Brodyr: Drama Tair Act. Liverpool: Hugh Evans a'i Feibion. 1935. Play
- Cymru Rydd: Braslun o Bolisi'r Blaid Genedlaethol. Caernarfon: Swyddfa'r Blaid. 1937. Plaid Genedlaethol Cymru political pamphlet
  - English translation: The New Wales: Synopsis of the Policy of the Welsh Nationalist Party. Caernarfon: Swyddfa'r Blaid. n.d.
- Y Dewis. Dinbych: Gwasg Gee. 1942. Novel
- Diofal Yw Dim. Caerdydd: John Gwilym Jones. 1942. Play
- Y Goeden Eirin. Dinbych: Gwasg Gee. 1946. Short stories
  - English translation: The Plum Tree and Other Short Prose. Translated by Stephens, Meic. Bridgend: Seren. 2004. ISBN 1854113534.
- Lle Mynno'r Gwynt; A Gŵr Llonydd: Dwy Ddrama. Dinbych: Gwasg Gee. 1958. Two plays
- Y Tad a'r Mab: Drama. Aberystwyth: Gwasg y Gler. 1963. Play
  - 2nd edition: Y Tad a'r Mab: Drama. Llandysul: Gwasg Gomer. 1970.
- Hanes Rhyw Gymro. Bangor: Cyhoeddir gan Gymdeithas y Cymric a Chymdeithas y Ddrama Gymraeg, Coleg y Brifysgol. 1964. Play
- Goronwy Owen's Virginian Adventure: His Life, Poetry, and Literary Opinions, with a Translation of His Virginian Letters. Williamsburg, VA: Botetourt Bibliographical Society. 1969. Lecture, in Welsh with English translation
- William Williams Pantycelyn. Caerdydd: Gwasg Prifysgol Cymru. 1969. ISBN 090076807X. Critical study, in Welsh and English parallel text
- Daniel Owen: Astudiaeth. Dinbych: Gwasg Gee. 1970. ISBN 0900996293. Critical study
- Pedair Drama. Dinbych: Gwasg Gee. 1971. ISBN 0707400414. Four plays: Pry Ffenast, Yr Oedfa, Hynt Peredur, and A Barcud yn Farcud Fyth
- Rhyfedd y'n Gwnaed: Tair Drama. Dinbych: Gwasg Gee. 1976. ISBN 0707400988. Three plays: Tri chyfaill, Dwy Ystafell, and Un Briodas
- Nofelydd Yr Wyddgrug; The Novelist from Mold. Denbigh: Bwyllgor Ystafell Goffa Daniel Owen. 1976. ISBN 0950559709. Lecture, in Welsh and English, on Daniel Owen
- Ac Eto Nid Myfi: Drama Dair Act. Dinbych: Gwasg Gee. 1976. ISBN 070740097X. Play
- Ymweliad yr Hen Foneddiges: Comedi Drasig, mewn Tair Act. Caerdydd: Wasg Prifysgol Cymru. 1976. ISBN 0708306306. Translation by John Gwilym Jones of Friedrich Dürrenmatt's play Der Besuch der alten Dame
- Crefft y Llenor. Dinbych: Gwasg Gee. 1977. ISBN 9780000671202. Critical study
- Yr Adduned. Llandysul: Gwasg Gomer. 1979. ISBN 0850885124. Play
- Tri Diwrnod ac Angladd. Llandysul: Gwasg Gomer. 1979. ISBN 0850886023. Novel
- Yr Arwr yn y Theatr. Bangor: Cymdeithas Theatr Cymrutad. 1980. Critical study
- Ar Draws ac ar Hyd. Caernarfon: Gwasg Gwynedd. 1986. ISBN 0000773492. Memoirs, edited by Gwenno Hywyn

== Sources ==
- Lewis, William R. (1994). John Gwilym Jones. Cardiff: University of Wales Press. ISBN 0708312519.
- Poplawski, Paul, ed. (2003). Encyclopedia of Literary Modernism. Westport, CT: Greenwood Press. ISBN 0313310173.
- Stephens, Meic, ed. (1986). The Oxford Companion to the Literature of Wales. Oxford: Oxford University Press. ISBN 0192115863.
- Thomas, Gwyn (2004). "Jones, John Gwilym". Oxford Dictionary of National Biography (online ed.). Oxford University Press. doi:10.1093/ref:odnb/61278. (Subscription, Wikipedia Library access or UK public library membership required.)
