= The Great Deed of Gwilym Bevan =

Early Welsh language novel

- Cover of the English Translation published by Melin Bapur in 2024.
- Author: T. Gwynn Jones
- Language: Welsh (original)
- Genre: Fiction
- Publisher: Melin Bapur Books (English translation)
- Publication date: 1899 (original); 2024 (translation)
- Publication place: United Kingdom
- Media type: Print (paperback)
- Pages: 198

The Great Deed of Gwilym Bevan (Welsh: Gorchest Gwilym Bevan) is a novel in Welsh by T. Gwynn Jones, originally written and serialised in 1899 before being published as a book later that year. The English translation by Adam Pearce was published by Melin Bapur Books in 2024.

== Synopsis ==
The novel begins in London and follows the title character, an adult orphan who is about to commit suicide by throwing himself into the River Thames when he is prevented from doing so by an unknown young woman. He then returns to the slate quarrying communities of North Wales, where the rest of the book is set, and finds work in a quarry.

Gwilym gains a reputation for his knowledge, scholarly habits and level-headedness, however he is also viewed by some with suspicion because he does not appear to attend chapel on Sundays; this leads to some to refer to him as an atheist, though Gwilym's views are implied to be agnostic.

When a group of coal miners from South Wales sing to raise funds in the town square, Gwilym makes an impassioned plea to the people to support them. This speech earns him the condemnation of the local Methodist minister, Calfin Jones, but makes him popular amongst the quarry workers who appoint him their leader in their industrial dispute with the quarry's owner, Mr. Tomos Morrus, about their pay and conditions.

Whilst out walking in Eryri, Gwilym rescues a young lady in difficulty as she is climbing; the same young woman who had saved him in London, whom, it transpires, is Olwen, the daughter of Mr. Morrus. The two fall in love; Morrus's alcoholic brother, Richard, shows an interest in Gwilym, but Olwen warns Gwilym not to trust him. She entrusts a ring to him as a token of her affection.

The suicide of Joseff, an impoverished quarry worker, following his daughter's death from malnourishment leads to an altercation in the quarry during which Gwilym blames Morrus, for Joseff's death. Whilst Morrus shows empathy for Joseff's fate, he blames Joseff himself for failing to manage his finances. Morrus dismisses Gwilym for publicly accusing him, Gwilym however continues to lead the workers in the dispute, which subsequently becomes a strike. Olwen's brother Arthur returns from travelling the continent and tries unsuccessfully to persuade his father to yield to the workers' demands; he makes a generous donation to the workers fund but it is delivered by Richard, who implies to Gwilym that he made the donation himself.

A fire breaks out in Joseff's former house, leading to the death of a child as well as Arthur, who is killed attempting to rescue him. Angered by the death of the child, a crowd of angry townspeople seem about to murder Mr. Morrus, but Gwilym persuades them to spare him. Although motivated by purely humanitarian concerns, this begins to make some of his fellow workers suspect that Gwilym and Morrus are somehow in league. Morrus, meanwhile, realises he is bankrupt, having invested all his wealth in a fraudulent scheme (in which Richard is involved, unbeknownst to Morrus) and the quarry business having been ruined by the strike.

As the strike drags on the workers begin to blame Gwilym for their suffering. During an argument at Gwilym's apartment, Olwen's ring is found by one of the workers, who take it as further evidence of Gwilym's betrayal of the agreement to share and share alike between the workers. Olwen arrives, having sold her possessions to elope with Gwilym; this convinces the workers that Gwilym is in league with Morrus, and a group of the workers assault Gwilym and carry him off, injuring Olwen in the process.

Gwilym is rescued when the minister, Calfin Jones, calms the crowd; Gwilym then returns to his lodgings to find Olwen dying; Mr. Morrus also appears, having been heard a rumour that his daughter has been murdered. The rioting crowd break into the room to get at Gwilym and Morrus, however they are saved by a by now extremely ill Richard, who appears with a pistol threatening to shoot anyone who takes another step.

Olwen dies of her wounds and Richard of his profligacy, but not before revealing he is in fact Gwilym's father, and leaving him an inheritance of five thousand pounds which, he claims—knowing Gwilym would not accept them if he thought they were the proceeds of crime—were earned legitimately. Gwilym, deep in depression following Olwen's death and his own health failing him, gives the money to Morrus, in an act of mercy and forgiveness—the 'great deed' of the title—enabling Morrus to re-employ the workers (on fairer terms) and restore peace and prosperity to the town.

== Reception ==
Unlike the great majority of Welsh-language novels from the period, the novel would be published both as a volume and a second serialisation in Y Cymro in 1906, indicating a degree of popularity. Whilst describing it as a "fine story," one contemporary reviewer felt that the novel's ending, in which the antagonist, Mr. Morrus, remains the owner of the quarry, undermined its message. Dafydd Jenkins, in his seminal treatise on the Welsh language novel in 1946, noted that whilst the social commentary was an additional element that set the novel apart from many of its period, he felt that the commentary was too broad and superficial.

In contrast to Jenkins and the reviewer in the London Kelt, in the introduction to the 2024 translation, translator Adam Pearce suggests that the novel's ending is deliberately about compromise and reconciliation, a "nuanced lesson... part of what makes the novel far more than just a Marxist parable."

In his biography of T. Gwynn Jones, Alan Llwyd notes how Gwynn's early novels such as Gwilym Bevan "were a significant step forward for the novel in Welsh"
