= T. Gwynn Jones =

Welsh poet, scholar, literary critic, novelist, translator, and journalist

Y Prifardd Professor T. Gwynn Jones
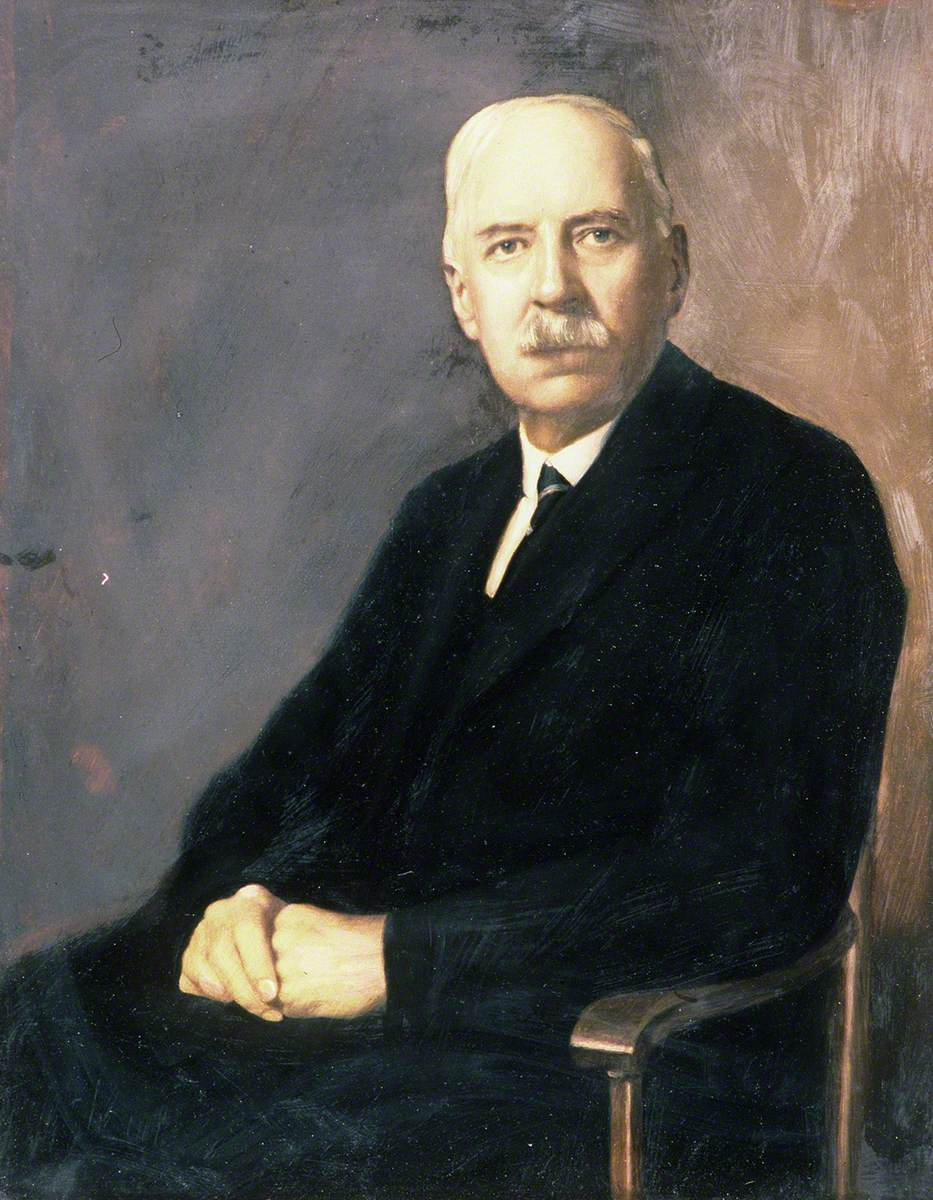
- Anonymous portrait of T. Gwynn Jones in the National Library of Wales
- Born: Thomas Jones; 10 October 1871; Y Gwyndy Uchaf, Betws-yn-Rhos, Denbighshire, Wales
- Died: 7 March 1949 (aged 77); Willow Lawn, Caradoc Road, Aberystwyth, Cardiganshire, Wales
- Other name: Gwynvre ap Iwan
- Occupations: Journalist, librarian, academic and poet
- Notable work: Ymadawiad Arthur
- Title: Emeritus Professor of Celtic
- Spouse: Margaret Jane Davies
- Children: Eluned, Arthur ap Gwynn, Llywelyn
- Parent(s): Isaac Jones and Jane Roberts
- Awards: National Eisteddfod Chair (1902 and 1905), D.Litt (Wales) (1937), D.Litt (Eire) (1937), C.B.E. (1937)

Professor Thomas Gwynn Jones C.B.E. (10 October 1871 – 7 March 1949), more widely known as T. Gwynn Jones, was a leading Welsh poet, scholar, literary critic, novelist, translator, and journalist who did important work in Welsh literature, Welsh education, and the study of Welsh folk tales in the first half of the twentieth century. He was also an accomplished translator into Welsh of works from English, German, Greek, and Irish.

== Personal life ==
Thomas Jones was born at Y Gwyndy Uchaf in Betws-yn-Rhos, Denbighshire, Wales, the eldest son of Isaac Jones and Jane Roberts. He was educated in Denbigh and Abergele. In 1899 he married Margaret Jane Davies, the daughter of Thomas Davies of Denbigh, by whom he had three children.

== Career ==
=== 1890s–1900s: Journalistic period ===
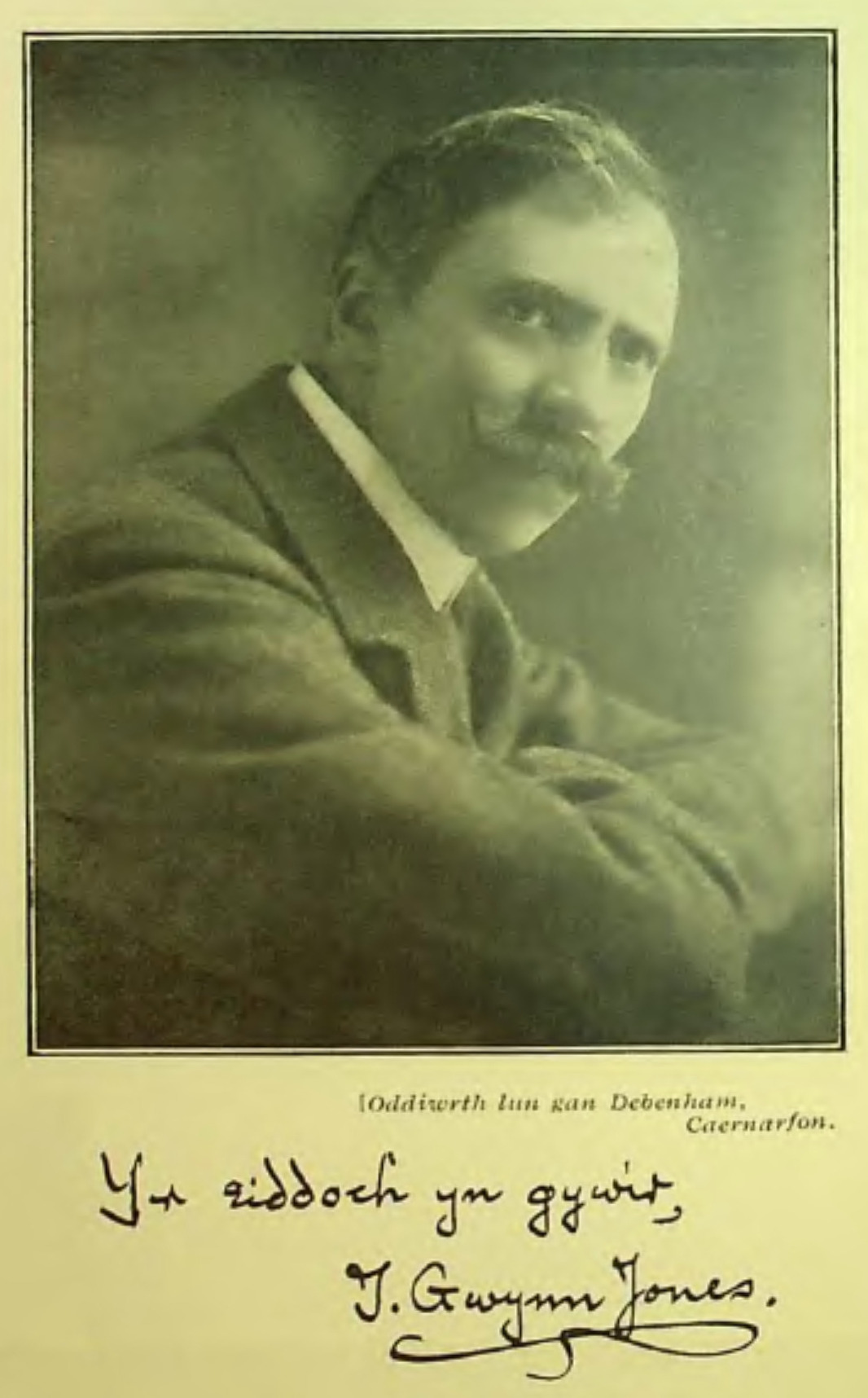
T. Gwynn Jones in his 30s.

Always of a fragile physical disposition, Jones was unable to take up a scholarship to Oxford University due to one of many bouts of ill health which were to plague him throughout his life. He instead moved to Caernarfon and took up journalism, writing for a number of newspapers in both English and Welsh. By 1890 he was a sub-editor on the Welsh-language newspaper Baner ac Amserau Cymru (Y Faner). His first novel, Gwedi Brad a Gofid was serialised in 1898 and he would be writing novels more or less continuously for the next decade; his greatest ambition however had always been to be a poet, and many of his poems appeared in various publications. His first collection of poetry, Gwlad y Gân, was met with mixed reviews, a fact probably not helped by the fact that the title poem satirised the Welsh literary establishment and Eisteddfod tradition.

In 1902 however he won the coveted chair at the National Eisteddfod in Bangor for his awdl Ymadawiad Arthur, though he had not expected to win, and indeed was not present at the ceremony. The poem integrated the native Welsh traditions around King Arthur as found in the Mabinogion with those of the wider European tradition and ushered in a new Romantic era in Welsh language poetry, with Gwynn as one of its foremost figures. The poem is still one of his best known, though he himself claimed to dislike it.

In 1905 he became editor of the journal Papur Pawb, ushering in a period of intense productivity, producing, in the space of only a few years some five novels and over two hundred short stories, as well as a second Eisteddfod chair in 1908. This led ultimately to a physical collapse, leading to a tour of the Mediterranean Sea and a period spent in Egypt to recuperate. He spent much of his trip writing, writing a column of his experiences that was later published.

=== 1910s–1940s: Academic period ===
On his return to Wales he briefly took up journalism again, however in 1910 he left the profession to seek a less strenuous means of maintaining his family, finding work as an archivist at the National Library of Wales, Aberystwyth. Though surrounded by books he disliked the work, however he was able to maintain a parallel career in public lectures and later was appointed as a lecturer in the Welsh department at the University College of Wales, Aberystwyth, where he became a professor in 1919 - a remarkable achievement for a man without an undergraduate degree.

His major academic work was an edition of the fifteenth-century poet, Tudur Aled; he also wrote a famous biography of the great Liberal publisher Thomas Gee, whose work influenced Jones throughout his life. He was extremely highly respected within Celtic Studies and an attempt was made to nominate him for a Nobel Prize for Literature, though he refused to accept it, believing himself unworthy.

With journalism he had left behind prose, and Jones would not write another novel after 1910, though some of his earlier work would be published. He would not compete at the Eisteddfod again, however he continued to write poetry however throughout his life, producing many of his finest longer poems later in life, such as Madog, Tir-na-nog and Anatiomaros. Many of these were in a darker, more modernist idiom than his earlier work. A collection of his own selections from his poetry was published as Caniadau.

A strong opponent of the First World War, Jones walked out of the Tabernacle Chapel in Aberystwyth when the minister offered a prayer for a British victory in the war. He later wrote "If there's anything I understand from the New Testament, it is that Jesus Christ is not a militaristic person. He is the Saviour of the world, he is the Prince of Peace. Therefore those who say they are Christians, followers of Christ must reject war totally."

He was awarded CBE in the 1937 Coronation Honours.

== Influence ==
=== As a poet ===
T. Gwynn Jones is widely recognised as a major twentieth century poet in the Welsh language and one of the finest poets in the language of any century.

Though his relationship with the literary establishment was often fraught, particularly when young, he is now recognised in playing a significant role in liberating the Eisteddfod tradition from an obsession with form and in recognising the potential of cynghanedd to be put to new uses, and in doing so, liberating it. A master of the art, many of his best known poems are in cynghanedd.

Jones was one of the foremost members of a new Romantic school of poets in Welsh at the start of the twentieth century alongside such figures as W. J. Gruffydd, R. Silyn Roberts, Eifion Wyn and Hedd Wyn.

=== As a novelist ===
Gwynn's impact as a novelist is harder to measure; though he was extremely productive in this field, many of his novels were serialised anonymously and most were never published in book form. However, in his biography of Gwynn, Alan Llwyd suggests that his novels were a significant step forward for prose writing in the language, naming him the "uncle" of the Welsh language novel (with Daniel Owen the father). One of Gwynn's novels, Enaid Lewys Meredydd, is likely the first science fiction novel in the language.

=== On English literature ===
T. Gwynn Jones's writings had a significant influence on Robert Graves in his mythopoeic study The White Goddess. Graves developed his suggestion of a distinction between the restricted poetry of the official Welsh bards, and the more expansive and fanciful unofficial Welsh writings: "The tales and Romances, on the other hand, are full of colour and incident; even characterization is not absent from them. In them fancy...develops into imagination".

== Published works ==
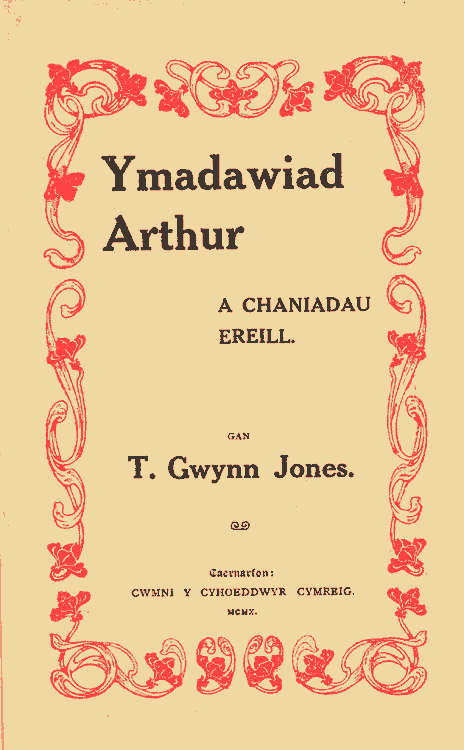
Cover of Ymadawiad Arthur a Chaniadau Eraill, a collection of poems in Welsh by T. Gwynn Jones (Caernarfon, 1910).

=== Novels and short stories (selection) ===
- Gwedi Brad a Gofid (1898)
- Brethyn Cartref (1913; short stories originally published in magazines between 1906 and 1908)
- Camwri Cwm Eryr (1898–99)
- Gorchest Gwilym Bevan (1899) - English translation The Great Deed of Gwilym Bevan published 2024.
- Rhwng Rhaid a Rhyddid (1900)
- Llwybr Gwaed ac Angau (1902)
- Enaid Lewys Meredydd (1905
- John Homer (1923; original serial 1908)
- Lona (1923; original serial 1908)

=== Poetry ===
- Gwlad y Gân a cherddi eraill (1902)
- Caniadau (1934)
- Y Dwymyn (1944)
- (trans.), Awen y Gwyddyl (1922) – translated Irish poetry.
- (trans.), Blodau o Hen Ardd (1927) – translated Greek epigrams.
- (trans.), Faust by Goethe (1922)

=== Academic and other works ===
- Astudiaethau (1936)
- Bardism and Romance (1914)
- Beirniadaeth a Myfyrdod (1935)
- Brithgofion (1944)
- Cofiant Thomas Gee (1913)
- Cymeriadau (1933)
- Dyddgwaith (1937)
- Eglwys y Dyn Tlawd (1892)
- Emrys ap Iwan. Cofiant (1912)
- (ed.) Gwaith Tudur Aled, 2 vols., (1926)
- Llenyddiaeth Y Cymry (1915)
- Rhieingerddi'r Gogynfeirdd (1915)
- (trans.) Visions of the Sleeping Bard (1940)
- Welsh Folklore and Welsh Folk-custom (1930)
