= Arthur ap Gwynn =

Welsh librarian (1902–1987)

- Born: 4 November 1902; Caernarfon, Wales, UK
- Died: 10 December 1987; Aberystwyth, Wales, UK
- Occupation: Librarian
- Employer: University College of Wales
- Spouse: Catherine Eluned Gwynn (married 1933)
- Father: Thomas Gwynn Jones

Arthur ap Gwynn (1902–1987) was the third librarian at the University College of Wales and an editor.

== Early life and education ==
Born 4 November 1902 in Caernarfon, Arthur ap Gwynn was the son of Margaret Jane Jones and poet T. Gwynn Jones, whilst his father worked for the newspapers Yr Herald Cymraeg, Papur Pawb and the Carnarvon & Denbigh Herald.

He was a middle child, between Eluned and Llywelyn. His family moved several times before settling in 1909 in Aberystwyth, where he attended Ardwyn County School. He graduated in 1923 with first class honours from University College of Wales, Aberystwyth. Three or four years later, he received his M.A. degree.

== Career ==
He worked at the National Library of Wales from 1923 to 1925. He was employed at the Cardiff Free Library until 1932 as the Welsh department head. In Aberystwyth, he was the librarian of the University College of Wales until 1967, except for a three-year period (1942–1945), when he completed his National Service with the Swansea Fire Service.

He was editor of the Welsh Periodicals Subject Index. In 1950, Gwynn and his father published a dual English/Welsh and Welsh/English dictionary. He also worked on having revised editions of his father's works published following his death.

== Personal life ==
In 1933, he married Catherine Eluned Isaac, a Welsh language student at the University of Cardiff. Their three children were Nonn, Rhys, and Ceredig. In 1943, Rhys died at the age of four.

Except for brief periods where his occupational changes took him to Cardiff and Swansea, Gwynn lived primarily in the Aberystwyth area. He lived in Waun-fawr area of Aberystwyth beginning in 1945 and then retired to Eglwys-fach, Ceredigion. Catherine died in April 1975. He provided an endowment for archaeology books in memory of his deceased son and wife for Aberystwyth University's Hugh Owen Library, which opened 1 September 1976. Gwynn died 10 December 1987, and his cremated remains were scattered in mid-Wales. His papers are archived at the Hugh Owen Library.

== Publications ==
- ap Gwynn, Arthur (1933). Modern Welsh books from point of view of Reader and Librarian.
- ap Gwynn, Arthur; Jones, Thomas Gwynn (1950). Geiriadur Cymraeg-Saesneg a Saesneg-Cymraeg. Cardiff: Hughes a'i Fab a'r Educational Publishing Company.
