= David Vaughan Thomas =

Welsh composer

David Vaughan Thomas or David Vaughan-Thomas (15 March 1873 – 15 September 1934), born David Thomas, and known also by his bardic name Pencerdd Vaughan, was a composer, organist, pianist and music administrator. His compositions are deeply influenced by the musical and literary traditions of his native Wales. Though his music is now little performed he has been described as "the leading native Welsh musician of [his] time" and as "one of the most important composers in the transitional period of Welsh music from the Victorian era to our own times". The broadcaster Wynford Vaughan-Thomas was his son.

== Life ==
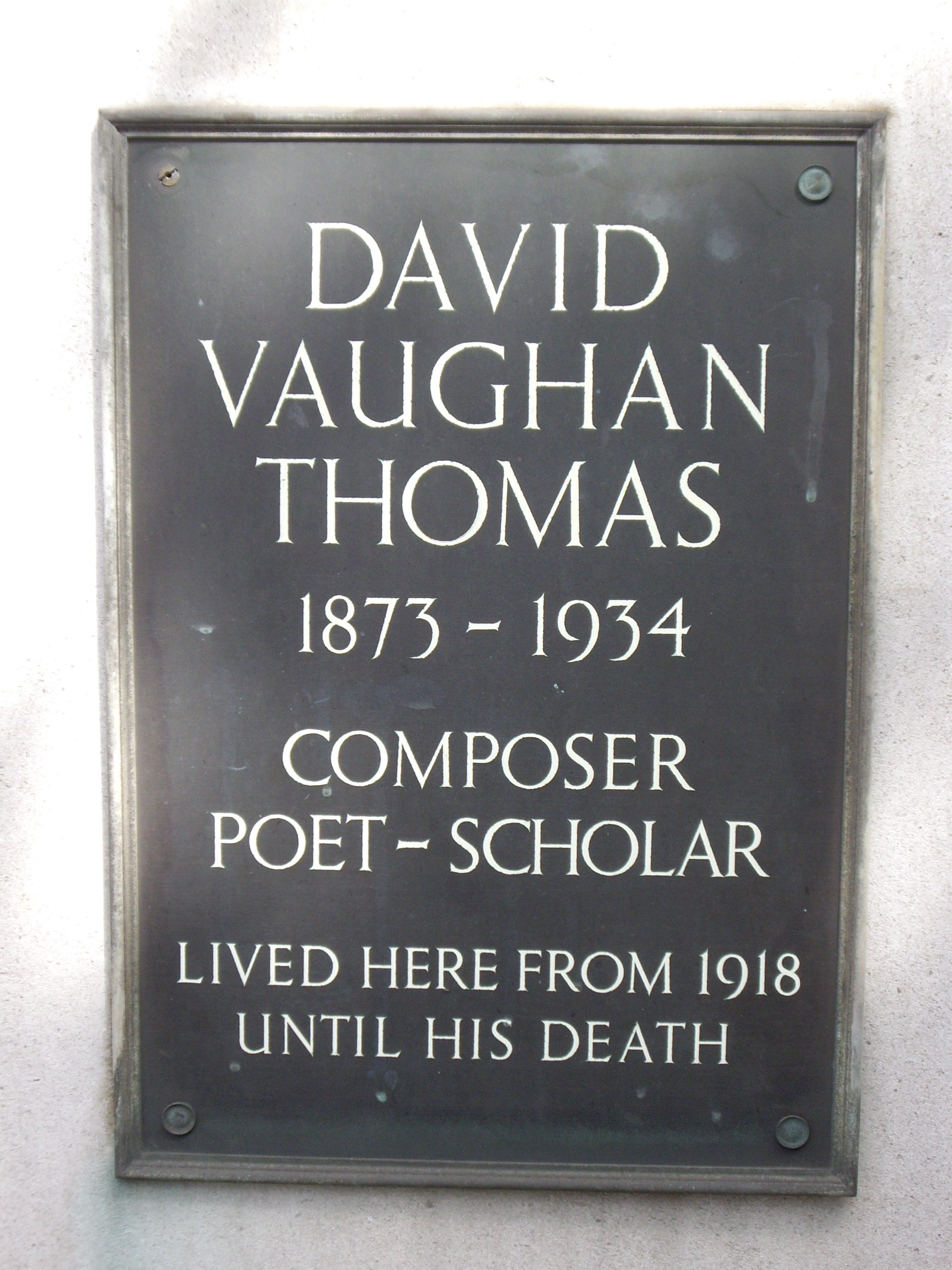
The plaque which could until recently be seen at 141 Walter Road, Swansea, Thomas's home.

Born in 1873 to Jenkin Thomas and Anne Thomas in Ystalyfera, he moved with the family successively to Llantrisant, Maesteg, Llangennech, Dowlais and Pontarddulais. He received his musical education from the composer Joseph Parry, and also went to Llandovery College and Exeter College, Oxford, where he graduated in mathematics. Returning later to Oxford, he gained degrees as Bachelor of Music and Doctor of Music. For some years he worked as a mathematics teacher at United Services College, Westward Ho!, and Monkton Combe School, Bath, before becoming a music teacher and organist at Harrow School. In 1906 he married Morfydd Lewis; they had three sons, including the broadcaster Wynford Vaughan-Thomas. At this time Thomas turned to music composition, his first known work being dated 1906. Subsequent works were performed in Wales, London and South Africa.

He moved back to Wales and became a member of the Gorsedd at the 1911 National Eisteddfod, taking the additional surname Vaughan on this occasion. He subsequently acted as adjudicator, and was Chief Musical Advisor for the 1926 National Eisteddfod in Swansea. In 1919 he applied for the post of music director of the University of Wales, but controversially the decision was made to appoint Walford Davies instead. Vaughan Thomas was a man of many talents. Apart from his mathematical gifts he was a poet, a scholar, a pianist, wrote articles and reviews for the magazine Welsh Outlook and for several music journals, produced a report on the teaching of music in Welsh schools, lectured, and acted as organist of Mount Pleasant Baptist Chapel, Swansea. In 1927 he was made overseas examiner for Trinity College, London, and in this capacity he travelled to several Commonwealth countries. It was on one such tour in South Africa that he died in Johannesburg.

== Music ==
Vaughan Thomas's music developed out of an early Victorianism (some of his songs have been compared to those of Schubert and Brahms) into a national style inspired by Welsh literature and folklore and by the musical traditions of his country, such as penillion singing and the use of the harp for accompaniment. His settings of Welsh poems adapt the traditional metres with great sensitivity. His mature style has been described as "fastidious and cultivated", and as being marked by a strong sense of harmony and careful craftsmanship.

His most notable compositions are considered to be his choral works Llyn y Fan (performed at the 1907 National Eisteddfod), A Song for St Cecilia's Day (performed at Queen's Hall, London, 1909) and The Bard (a setting of the poem by Thomas Gray, performed at Queen's Hall, London, 1912); also his songs to texts by George Meredith (performed at the 1922 Three Choirs Festival) and his settings of cywyddau. There are in addition many partsongs, anthems, hymns, chamber pieces, and folksong arrangements.

Vaughan Thomas's music has become a rarity in the concert hall. His song "Ysbryd y Mynydd" and his Saith o Ganeuon ar Gywyddau Dafydd ap Gwilym ac Erail (Seven songs on poems in cywydd metre by Dafydd ap Gwilym and others), praised in the 1950s for their originality and scholarship, remained popular long after his death, but most of his works were no longer played by the 1980s.

== Published musical works ==
Dates are those of publication.

=== Secular cantatas ===
- Llyn y Fan (John Jenkins) (c. 1907)
- A Song for St Cecilia's Day (John Dryden) (1909)
- The Bard (Thomas Gray) (1910)

=== Anthems and other sacred choral works ===
- Maes y Groes (n.d.)
- Bendithiaf yr Arglwydd (1907)
- Yspryd yw Duw (c. 1910)
- Rwy'n Ofni Grym y Dŵr (William Williams Pantycelyn) (1914)
- There is a Green Hill Far Away (Cecil Frances Alexander) (1914)
- Bywyd (Wiliam Llŷn) (c. 1925)
- Coffâd am y Gorseddogion Ymadawedig (1926)

=== Partsongs ===
- Y Gariad Gollwyd (William Wordsworth, trans. John Jenkins) (1909)
- The Summer Night (Owen Griffith Owen) (1913)
- Up-Hill (Christina Rossetti) (1914)
- Hymn to Diana (Ben Jonson) (1914)
- Here's to Admiral Death (Henry Newbolt) (1916)
- Let Us Now Praise Famous Men (Lewis Davies) (c. 1920)
- Deio Bach (John Jones) (c. 1922)
- Y Fun a'r Lliw Ewyn Llif (Bedo Aeddren) (1925)
- How Sleep the Brave (William Collins) (1925)
- How Sweet the Moonlight Sleeps (William Shakespeare) (1929)
- Who Is Silvia? (William Shakespeare) (1932)
- Sweet Content (Thomas Dekker) (1932)
- Orpheus with His Lute (William Shakespeare) (1932)
- Summer Is Gone (Thomas Hood) (1932)
- Prospice (Robert Browning) (1936)

=== Piano music ===
- Romanza (1934)
- Allegro Vivace (1934)

=== Songs ===
- St David's Day Is Here (Lewis Davies) (n.d.). A composition by Lewis Davies arranged by Vaughan Thomas
- Angladd y Marchog (Robert David Rowland) (c. 1906)
- Cân y Bardd wrth Farw (Gwenffrwd) (c. 1907)
- Dorset Voices (J. J. Cadwaladr) (1913)
- Come Along; Can't You Hear? (D. M. Beddoes) (1914)
- Bedd y Dyn Tylawd (John Jones) (1914)
- Llais yr Adar (Anonymous) (c. 1914)
- Ysbryd y Mynydd (Lewis Davies Jones) (1914)
- Si hwi lwli (T. H. Jones) (1914)
- Y Newydd Dant (Edward Jenkins) (1915)
- Follow the Flag, Welshmen (J. J. Cadwaladr) (c. 1915)
- Nant y Mynydd (John Ceiriog Hughes) (c. 1921)
- Y Ferch o'r Scer (c. 1921)
- Cân Hen ŵr y Cwm (Gweryddon) (c. 1922)
- Cân y Llanc Chwerthinllyd (c. 1922)
- Einioes (Rhys Jones) (1922)
- A Song for St David's Day (Lewis Davies) (c. 1922)
- Enter These Enchanted Woods (George Meredith) (1923)
- Saith o ganeuon ar gywyddau Dafydd ap Gwilym ac eraill (Various) (c. 1923). Contents: "Y Nos", "Y Gwlith", "Miwsig", "Elen", "Dau Filgi", "Claddu'r Bardd o Gariad", "Hiraeth am yr Haf"
- Y Bwthyn Bach To Gwellt (Thomas Lloyd) (c. 1923)
- Dirge in Woods (George Meredith) (1924)
- Dwy Gân i Fariton (Wiliam Llŷn, Robert Ellis) (1926). Contents: "O Fair Wen", "Berwyn"
- Stafell Gynddylan (attrib. Llywarch Hen) (c. 1926)
- Ten Welsh Folk Songs (Traditional, trans. David Vaughan Thomas) (1928). Traditional melodies arranged by Vaughan Thomas
- Ymadawiad Arthur (T. Gwynn Jones) (1930)
- Caledfwlch (T. Gwynn Jones) (c. 1931)
- Ffarwel fy Ngeneth (Ebenezer Thomas) (c. 1933)
- Yr Wylan Deg (Dafydd ap Gwilym) (1950)

=== Vocal duet ===
- Ylloer (David Vaughan Thomas) (1924)
