= Yr Amserau =

Biweekly Welsh language newspaper

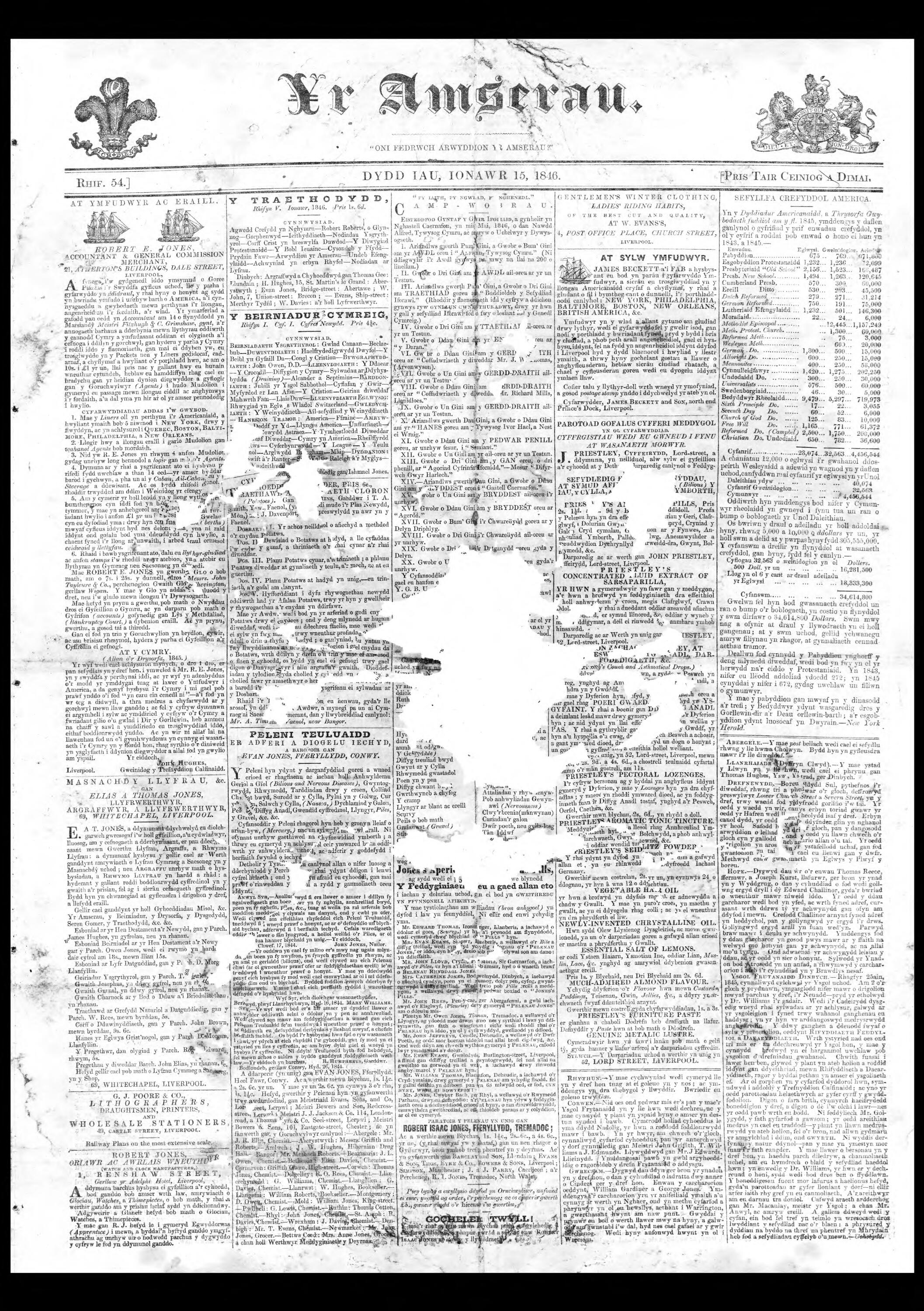
- Type: newspaper
- Owner(s): Thomas Gee (October 1859), John Lloyd (1848; October 1859)
- Founder(s): William Rees, John Jones
- Publisher: John Jones, Michael James Whitty, John Lloyd
- Editor: William Rees, John Roberts
- Launched: 24 August 1843
- City: Liverpool
- Country: United Kingdom
- OCLC number: 895987847

Yr Amserau (established in 1846 by William Rees and John Jones) was a bi-weekly Welsh language newspaper, distributed in Merseyside and North Wales. It covered local and national news, supporting radical and nonconformist principles The popular column (to which it may have owed its success) 'The Letters of an Old Farmer', covered topics such as religion, politics, education, and the Corn Laws. Associated titles: Baner ac Amserau Cymru (1859–1971).

Welsh Newspapers Online has digitised many of the early issues of Yr Amserau from the National Library of Wales' newspaper collection.
