= Y Traethodydd =

Welsh magazine

- Front page of Y Traethodydd from 1 January 2018
- Type: Quarterly Journal
- Owner: Gwasg Pantycelyn
- Founded: 1 January 1845; 181 years ago
- Country: Wales

Y Traethodydd (The Essayist) is a quarterly cultural magazine published in the Welsh language covering historical, literary and theological topics. It is the oldest magazine in Wales and the oldest magazine in the Welsh language still in publication.

== History ==
The journal was originally published in 1845 on behalf of the Welsh Calvinistic Methodist Church. It was founded by Roger Edwards and Lewis Edwards and was modelled on the influential Edinburgh Review. Both men were Welsh Calvinistic Methodist preachers, and Lewis Edwards successfully used the publication to disseminate information on the latest trends in theology, science, literature and philosophy. Edwards edited Y Traethodydd for its first ten years, when it was published in Denbigh by Thomas Gee, a fellow Nonconformist Welshman who was notable for printing Welsh magazines and journals.

Today the magazine claims to "offer discussions on a vast range of topics relating to 'culture', in the widest sense" and is published four times per year.

== Sources ==
- Davies, John; Jenkins, Nigel (2008). The Welsh Academy Encyclopaedia of Wales. Cardiff: University of Wales Press. ISBN 978-0-7083-1953-6.
