= Ellis Pierce =

Welsh writer and bookseller (1841–1912)

Ellis Pierce (29 January 1841 – 31 July 1912) also known as Elis o'r Nant, was a Welsh writer and bookseller.

== Early life ==
Ellis Pierce was born on a farm at Tan y Clogwyn, Dolwyddelan. He attended a school at Penmachno, but his little formal education was interrupted by a serious illness, which he survived with a crooked leg. Though he could not manage farmwork, he was set to help with weighing at a quarry.

== Career ==
While a young quarry worker, Pierce began writing for Baner ac Amserau Cymru, mostly articles about local conditions, reform efforts, and antiquity. He moved to America in 1870, settling at Utica, New York, but returned to Wales in 1874. He was clerk of the Dolwyddelan parish, and served a term on the Llanrwst board of guardians. He was known a longtime liberal in his politics.

In 1882, the Baner was successfully sued for libel, and Pierce had to pay the £250 debt incurred.

Pierce had a bookstall at the National Eisteddfod for many years. He was Recorder of the Gorsedd until a falling out over ceremonial procedure in 1898.

== Works by Ellis Pierce ==
Ellis's books were mainly historical romances in Welsh, with rural settings.

- Nanws ach Rhobert (1880)
- Yr Ymfudwr Cymreig (1883)
- A Guide to Nant Conway (1884)
- Rhamant Hanesyddol: Gruffydd ab Cynan (1885)
- Gwilym Morgan (1890)
- Syr Williams o Benamnen (1894)
- Teulu'r Gilfach (1897)
- Dafydd ab Siencyn yr Herwr, a Rhys yr Arian Daear (1905)
