= Gwasg Gee =

Former Welsh publishing company

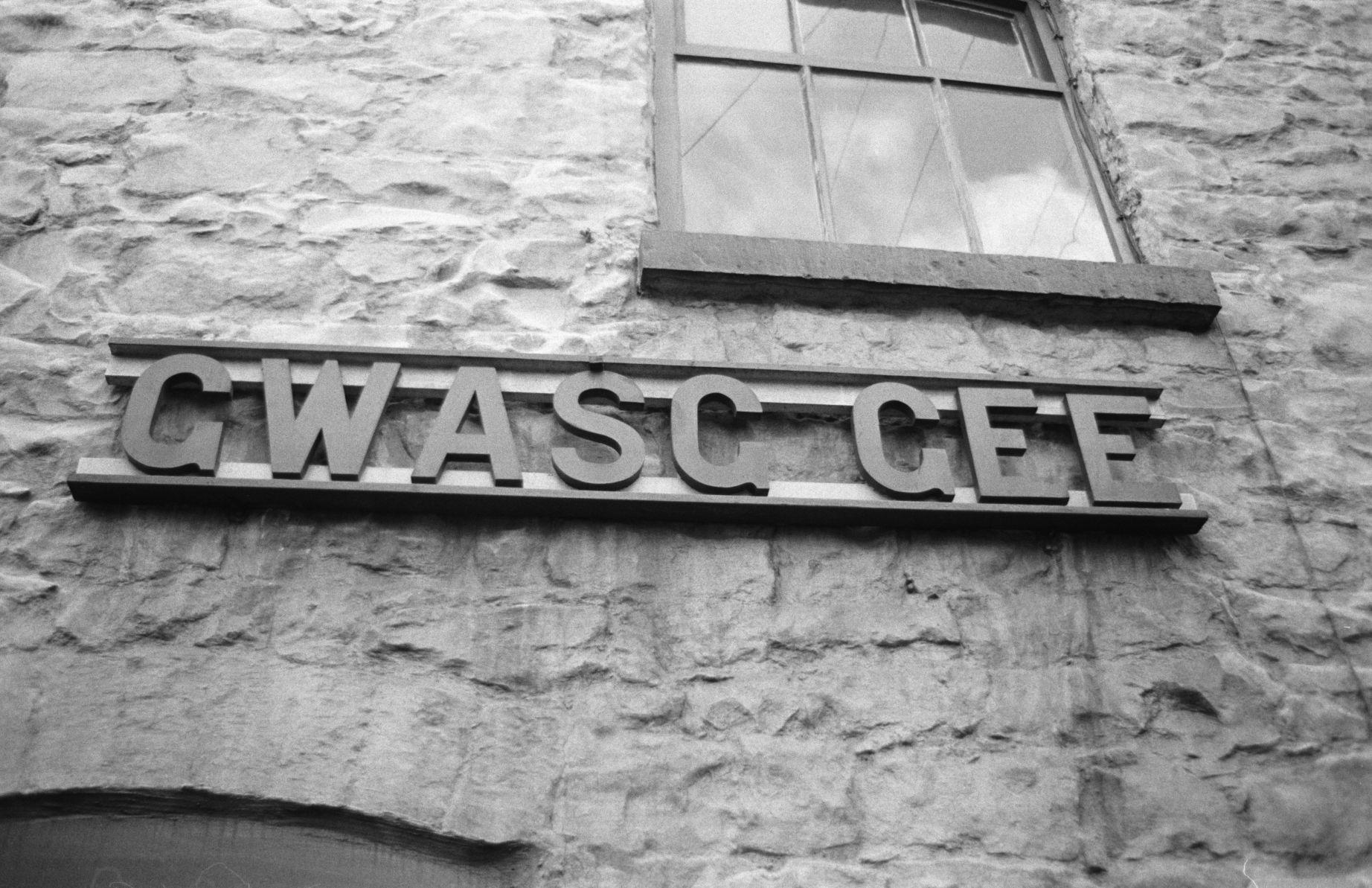

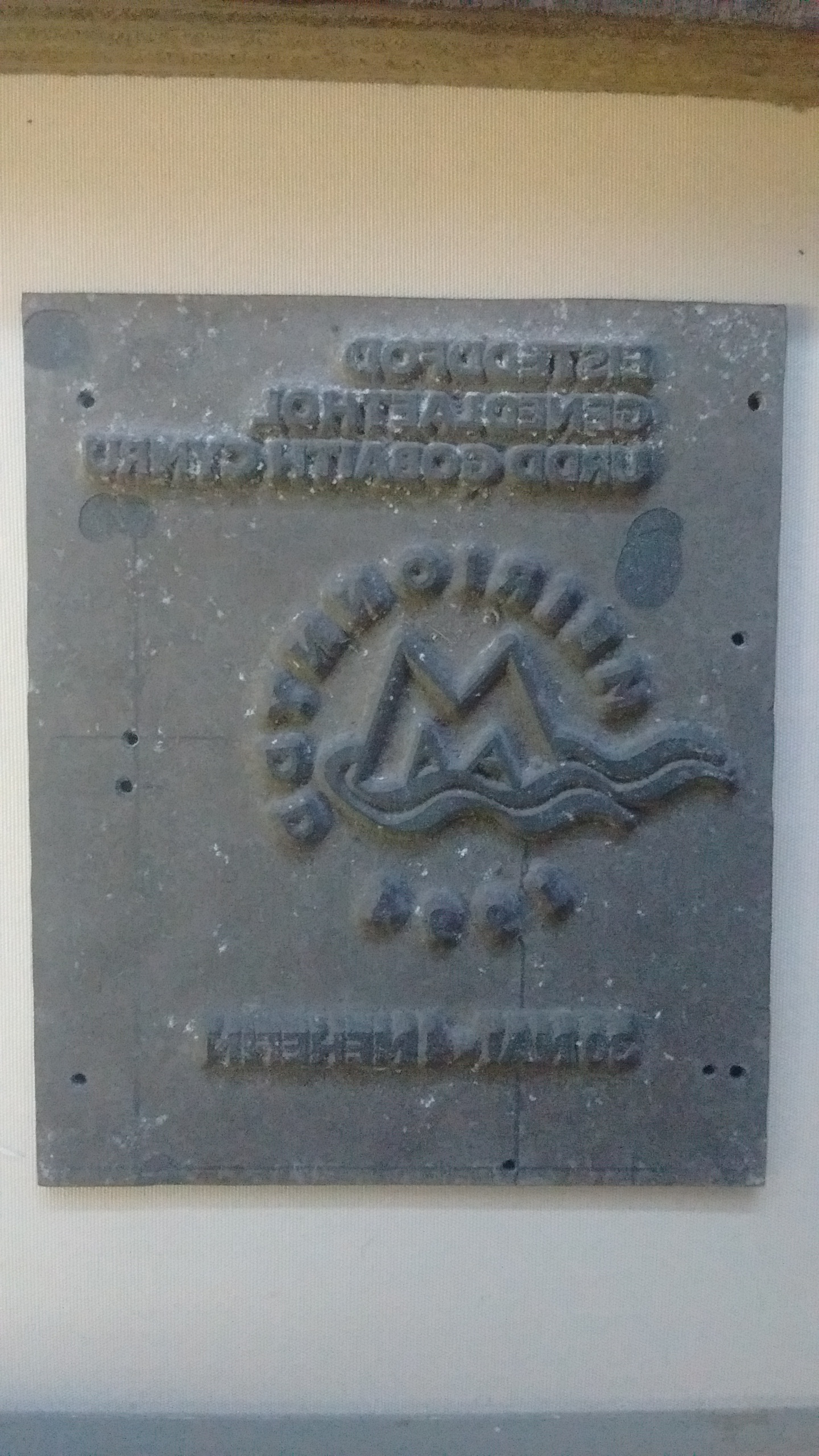

Gwasg Gee was a publishing firm founded by a printer, Thomas Gee, in 1808 and taken over by his son, a more famous Thomas Gee, during the 1830s and based in Denbigh, Wales. The name means "Gee Press".

In 1914, the business passed out of the hands of the Gee family, and it was in difficulties when the author Kate Roberts and her husband, Morris Williams took it on in the 1930s. In the 1950s Emlyn Hooson was asked by Gwilym R. Jones, the editor of Y Faner, to help save the press. Hooson then formed a group, including Talog Davies, William Jones, Sir George Hamer, Huw T. Edwards and David Tudor (who later took over full control) who developed Gwasg Gee as a company.

Gwasg Gee was one of the principal publishers of Welsh language books for almost two centuries. It ceased publishing in 2001.
