= Ymadawiad Arthur =

1902 poem by T. Gwynn Jones

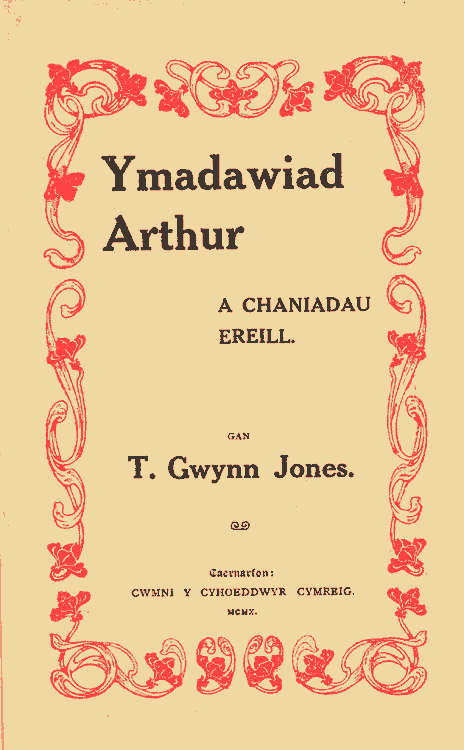
The front cover of a 1910 collection by T. Gwynn Jones that includes Ymadawiad Arthur as its title-poem

Ymadawiad Arthur ('The Passing of Arthur') is a Welsh-language poem, some 350 lines in length, by T. Gwynn Jones. It won its author the Chair at the National Eisteddfod in 1902 but was several times heavily revised by him in later years. It portrays King Arthur's last hours with his companion Bedwyr at the battle of Camlann and his final departure for Afallon. Ymadawiad Arthur is a hugely influential work, widely held to have opened a new era for Welsh-language poetry, marking the beginning of the early 20th-century renaissance of Welsh literature.

== Synopsis ==
The poem opens in the closing stages of King Arthur's final battle with Medrawd, the battle of Camlann. There is a cry of "Medrawd is killed", and Arthur's army pursues his enemies off the battlefield, leaving only Arthur himself and his companion Bedwyr. Bedwyr asks why Arthur is not with his army; Arthur says that he is gravely injured, and asks to be helped off the battlefield. Bedwyr carries him to a nearby stream and lays him down there. Arthur bids him take his sword, Caledfwlch, to a lake close at hand, throw it in, and bring him back a report of what happens. As Bedwyr is about to throw the sword he is reminded of an old rhyme which says that "There shall be no strong man without a fair sword". He cannot bring himself to carry out Arthur's order and instead hides the sword in a cave. Arthur orders him a second and a third time to throw the sword into the lake, and when finally Bedwyr does so he sees a hand rise from the lake and grasp the sword. On hearing of this Arthur asks Bedwyr to carry him to the lakeside. There a boat appears, bearing three maidens. Bedwyr carries the king onto the boat, but is not permitted to accompany the king to his fate. Arthur tells him he is going to Afallon, but will return to his kingdom when it has outlasted its present troubles and grown great again. The boat sails away, but before the grief-stricken Bedwyr turns back to the battle he hears the three maidens singing in the distance of the joys of Afallon.

== Composition and publication ==
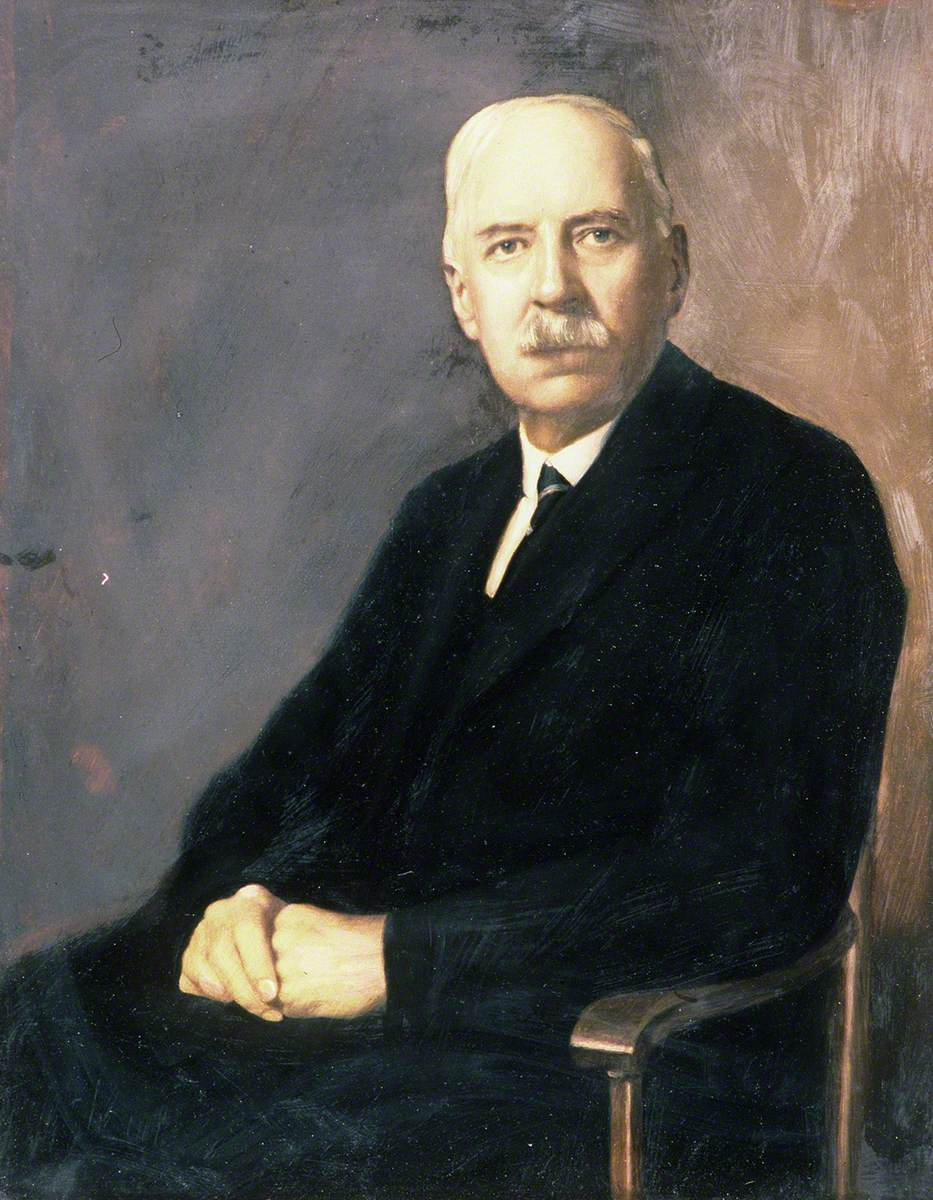
Portrait of Thomas Gwynn Jones, c. 1930

The poem was written for the 1902 National Eisteddfod, and it won Jones the first prize, the Chair. The subject for the contending poems had been previously set by the Eisteddfod judges, perhaps under the influence of Tennyson's Idylls of the King. Jones revised his poem under the guidance of John Morris-Jones before it was first published in the 1902 Eisteddfod edition, Yr Awdl, y Bryddest, a'r Telynegion. He revised it again before including it in his 1910 collection Ymadawiad Arthur a Chaniadau Ereill, and again in 1926 for his Detholiad o Ganiadau (reprinted in 1934 as Caniadau). The changes he introduced at each stage were substantial, and had the effect of simplifying the syntax and vocabulary of the poem and progressively removing the immaturities of the original version.

== Versification ==
Ymadawiad Arthur is an awdl, a form of long poem which employs a variety of classical Welsh metres, though Jones uses them with a greater degree of flexibility than had up to that time been usual. Jones was perhaps the greatest master of cynghanedd, the intricate Welsh system of prosodic alliteration and assonance, since the 15th century; in Ymadawiad Arthur, according to one critic, the cynghanedd "is so smooth and natural that often we deem it accidental". The poem is notable for its revival of many words from Middle Welsh, Jones being an influential exponent of what he called rhin yr heniaith, "the old language's virtue".

== Sources ==
Ymadawiad Arthur is a product of the world of 19th-century romantic medievalism, doubtless particularly influenced by "The Passing of Arthur" in Lord Tennyson's Arthurian epic, Idylls of the King; indeed Jones's poem has been said to be largely a translation from it. However it has also been argued that Malory's Le Morte d'Arthur, which tells much the same story, was Jones's main source.

The other main influence on the poem is the great body of medieval Welsh-language literature. Ymadawiad Arthur makes frequent reference to the tales of the Mabinogion, and perhaps also derives its narrative flow from Jones's study of the same source. Some of his knowledge of Welsh stories from the Middle Ages may derive not from the original texts but from secondary sources such as the scholarly works of Sir John Rhŷs. However, Jones certainly read with care the late medieval poems known as cywyddau, and the verse technique of Ymadawiad Arthur benefited substantially from this.

== Criticism and themes ==
This poem, at any rate in Jones's later revisions, is considered to be a masterpiece. In 1922 John Jay Parry called it "without a doubt the best thing the Welsh have produced on King Arthur in modern times, and...worthy to rank with the best in any language". It is often said to be the most important poem of the early 20th-century Welsh literary revival. Critics have particularly praised its elegance of language and brilliance of style, its avoidance of speechifying and philosophical disquisition, and, as compared with Tennyson's "The Passing of Arthur", its superior structure, dramatic qualities, and pace. It is, said Idris Bell, "a model of terse, nervous narration, and of exquisite verse".

The poem's themes are richly ambiguous and complex. Jones's narrative poems, Ymadawiad Arthur among them, are above all defences of the traditional, ancient values of his people in an age of increasing philistinism, materialism and industrial capitalism. In this he is comparable to earlier writers such as John Ruskin and William Morris. During the 19th century, it was falsely claimed that there was little Welsh interest in King Arthur, but in Ymadawiad Arthur he is reclaimed as a specifically Welsh representation of the fortune of Britain, while Bedwyr stands for the beleaguered Welsh nation. Jones's Arthur, according to Jerry Hunter, represents faith in the spirit of the Welsh nation's ability to resurrect itself and overcome the fragmentation of modern society. M. Wynn Thomas suggests that Arthur represents on the one hand "all the hope and all the excitement of Welsh nationalism", with particular reference to the figures of T. E. Ellis and David Lloyd George, and on the other hand the sense of disappointment that accompanied the collapse of the nationalist Cymru Fydd movement. William Beynon Davies sees Biblical parallels in the poem, with Arthur resembling in some ways the Messiah and in others the Suffering Servant. According to Hywel Teifi Edwards, Ymadawiad Arthur "brought back some of the mythopoeic grandeur which John Morris-Jones yearned for. More than that, he made of Bedwyr, the knight charged by Arthur to throw the great sword Excalibur into the lake, a prototype of the twentieth-century Welshman who, from generation to generation, armed only with a vision of his culture's worth, fights for its survival against an all-devouring materialism. Bedwyr, agonizing over the catastrophe which he feared would befall his defenseless country should he obey Arthur's command, is one of the most deeply moving figures in Welsh literature. Denied the security of a matchless weapon, the last tangible proof of Arthur's supernatural strength, he must fight on with only his faith in Arthur's promised return from Afalon to sustain him."

== Musical settings ==
David Vaughan Thomas wrote two settings of lines from the poem, Ymadawiad Arthur in 1930 and Caledfwlch in 1931. W. S. Gwynn Williams' song Ymadawiad Arthur (1935) also used Jones's poem. The Irish composer Shaun Davey set an extract from the poem on his 1983 album The Pilgrim.

== Editions and translations ==
Though Ymadawiad Arthur has never been translated in its entirety Tony Conran has produced an English version of an extended extract from the poem:

- Conran, Tony, ed. (1986). Welsh Verse. Bridgend: Seren. pp. 257–260. ISBN 9781854110817.

There are also at least three translations of the three stanzas in which the maidens sing of Afallon:

- Lloyd, D. M.; Lloyd, E. M., eds. (1953). A Book of Wales. London: Collins. pp. 265–266.
- Johnston, Dafydd (1998). "The Literary Revival". In Johnston, Dafydd (ed.). A Guide to Welsh Literature: c. 1900–1996. Cardiff: University of Wales Press. p. 14. ISBN 9780708314241.
- Gossedge, Rob (September 2007). "The old order changeth": Arthurian literary production from Tennyson to White (PDF) (PhD). Cardiff University. p. 186.
