= Thomas Gee =

Welsh preacher and journalist

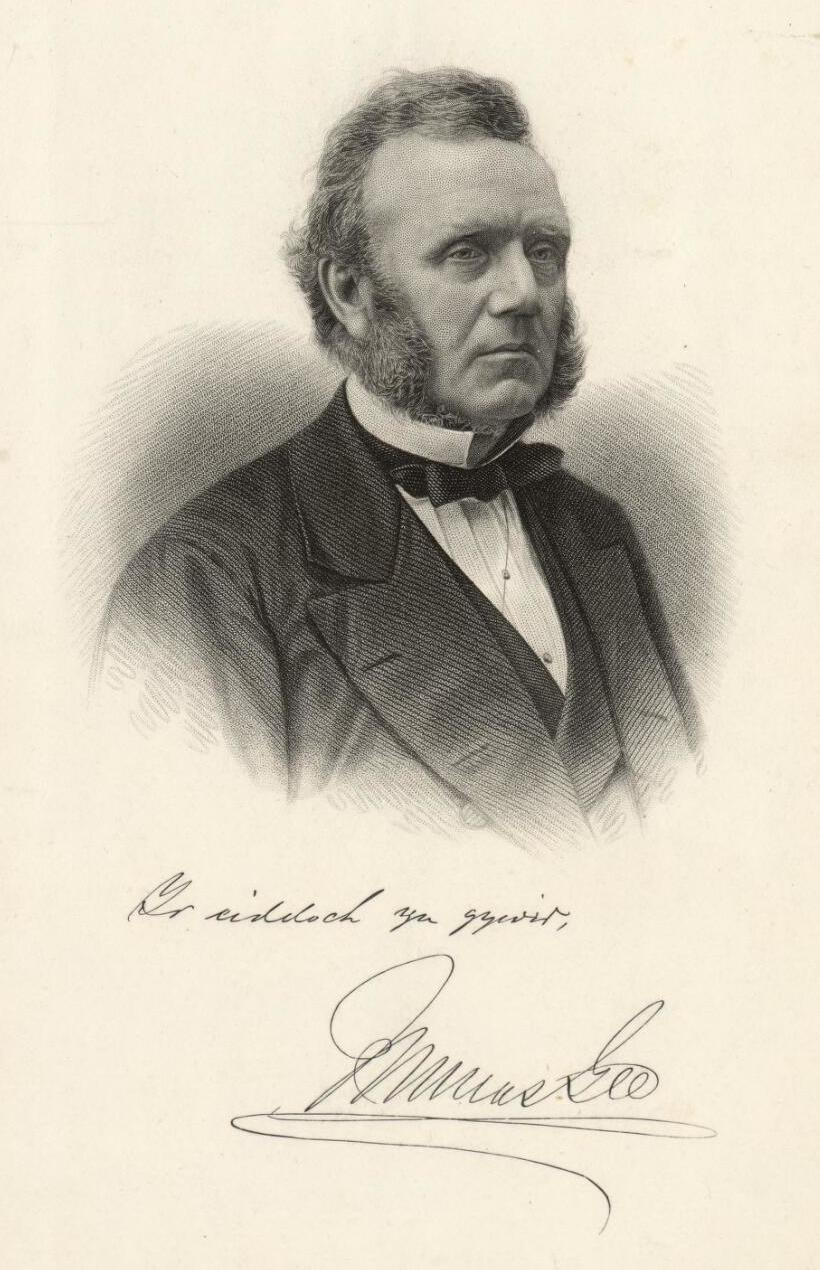
Portrait of Thomas Gee

Thomas Gee (24 January 1815 – 28 September 1898), was a Welsh Nonconformist preacher, journalist and publisher.

Gee was born in Denbigh, Wales. At the age of fourteen he went into his father's printing office, Gwasg Gee, but continued to attend the grammar school in the afternoons.

In 1837 he went to London to improve his knowledge of printing, and on his return to Wales in the following year, he threw himself into literary, educational and religious work. Among his publications were the well-known quarterly magazine Y Traethodydd ("The Essayist"), Y Gwyddoniadur Cymreig ("Encyclopaedia Cambrensis"), and Daniel Silvan Evans' English-Welsh Dictionary (1868), but his greatest achievement in this field was the newspaper Baner Cymru ("The Banner of Wales"), founded in 1857 and amalgamated with Yr Amserau ("The Times") two years later as Baner ac Amserau Cymru.

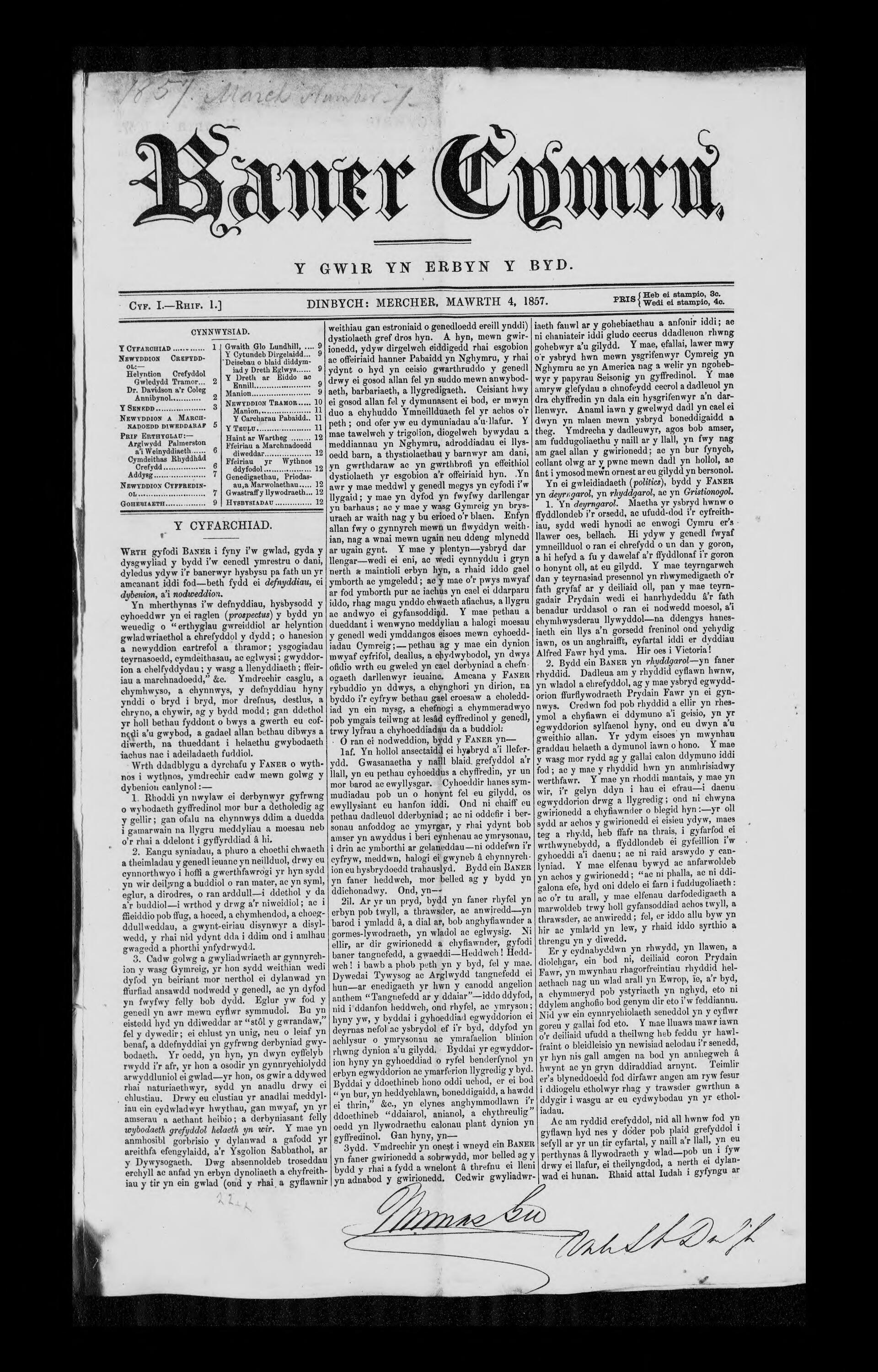
Front page of one of Gee's main newspapers: Baner Cymru

This paper soon became regarded as an oracle in Wales, and played a great part in promoting the nationalist and home rule movement in the country. In educational matters he waged a long and successful struggle on behalf of undenominational schools and for the establishment of the intermediate school system. He was an enthusiastic advocate of church disestablishment, and had a historic newspaper duel with John Owen (afterwards Bishop of St David's) on this question. The Eisteddfod found in him a thorough friend and a wise counsellor. His commanding presence, mastery of diction, and resonant voice made him an effective platform speaker. He was ordained to the Calvinistic Methodist ministry, at Bala in 1847, and gave his time and talents ungrudgingly to Sunday school and temperance work. Throughout his life he believed in the itinerant unpaid ministry rather than in the settled pastorate.

In 1886 he founded the Welsh Land League to campaign for the rights of tenants.

He was active in local politics as a Liberal. He was a member of Denbigh Town Council for many years (including a term as mayor), and he was the first chairman of Denbighshire County Council from its creation in 1889; a position he held until his death in 1898.

Gee attended the founding meeting of the Welsh National Liberal Council in August 1898, and was elected as the organisation's president. He died in September, and his funeral was at the time the most imposing ever seen in northern Wales.

Party political offices
Preceded by New position	President of the Welsh National Liberal Council; 1898	Succeeded by Thomas Williams
