= Baner ac Amserau Cymru =

Former weekly Welsh-language newspaper

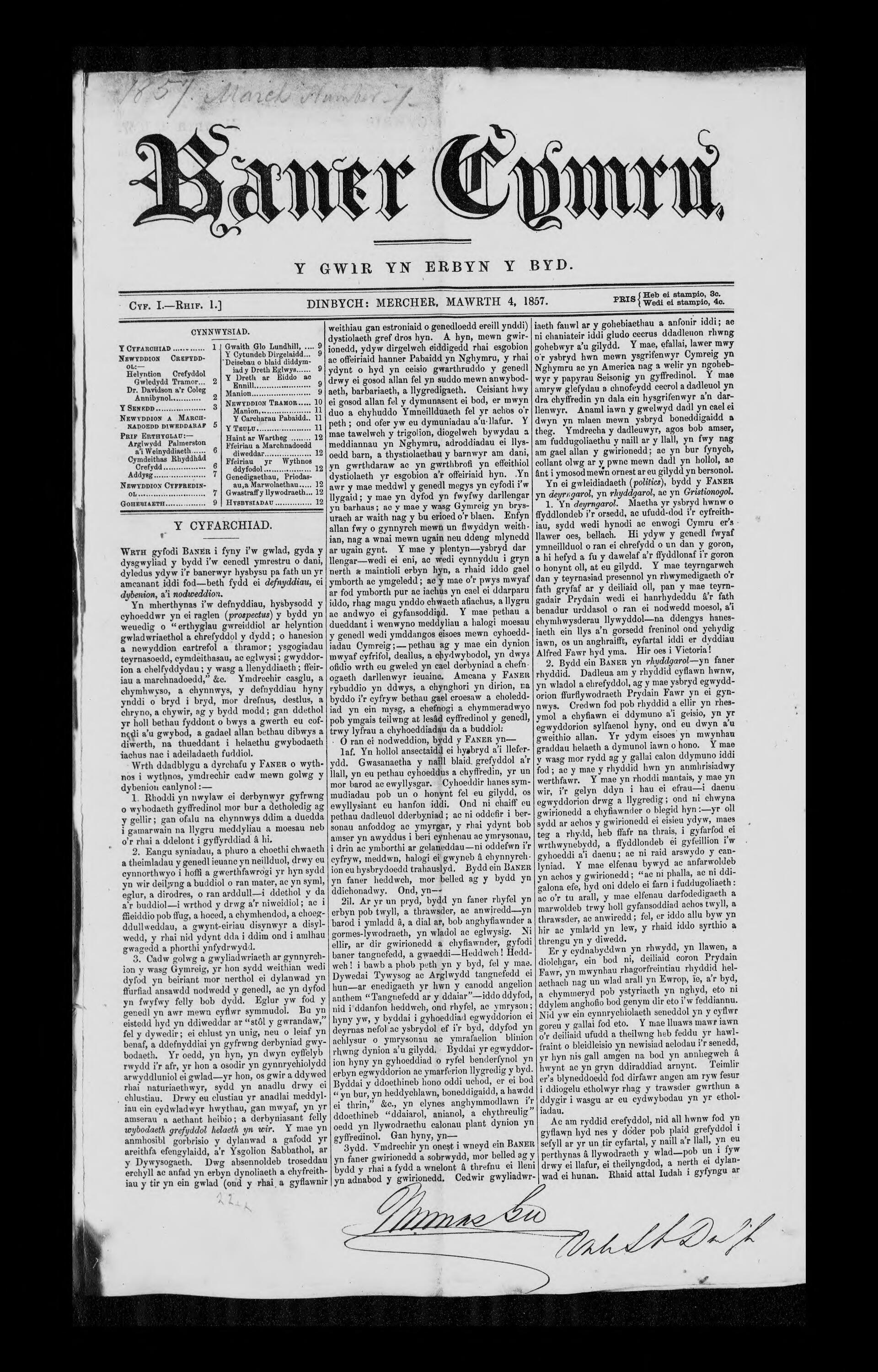
- Baner Cymru, Baner ac Amserau Cymru, Y Faner, Baner ac Amserau Cymru
- Type: weekly newspaper, newspaper
- Publisher: Thomas Gee
- Editor: Thomas Gee
- Launched: 4 March 1857
- City: Denbigh
- Country: Wales, United Kingdom
- OCLC number: 705965086

The Baner ac Amserau Cymru (established in 1857) was a weekly Welsh language newspaper, distributed throughout Wales and in the Liverpool area. It contained local and national news and information. It was formed by the amalgamation of Baner Cymru ("The Banner of Wales"), which had been founded in 1857 by Thomas Gee, and Yr Amserau ("The Times", founded 1846) in 1859. The bookseller and writer Ellis Pierce wrote for the Baner. It ran until 1972 when it was replaced by Y Faner, which folded in 1993.

Welsh Newspapers Online has digitised many of the early issues of Baner ac Amserau Cymru from the National Library of Wales' newspaper collection.
