= Henry Rees =

Welsh Calvinistic Methodist minister

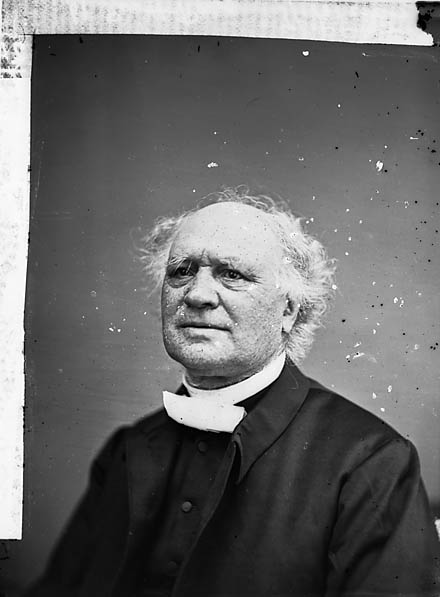
- Born: 15 February 1798
- Died: 18 February 1869 (aged 71)
- Occupation: Calvinistic Methodist minister

Henry Rees (15 February 1798 – 18 February 1869) was a Welsh Calvinistic Methodist leader.

== Biography ==
Rees was the eldest son of David Rees of Chwibren Isaf in the parish of Llansannan, Denbighshire, and Anne (Williams) of Cefn Fforest. He was born on 15 February 1798. William Rees (1802–1883) was his brother. His father, who moved in a short time to Rhyd Loew, and thence to Cae Du in the same district, was a lay officer of the Calvinistic Methodist connection, and Henry showed at an early age a deep interest in religious work. In May 1816 he left home to take employment on a farm near Bettws Abergele, and while in this district, in the spring of 1819, began to preach. Resolving to devote himself to the Calvinistic Methodist ministry, he came home to Cae Du in May, and then placed himself for two years under the tuition of Thomas Lloyd of Abergele. It was not the practice of the ministers of his connection at this time to depend wholly on the ministry for support, and accordingly, in 1821, he went to Shrewsbury to learn bookbinding. In the following year he was persuaded by his friends in that town to accept instead the charge of the Calvinistic Methodist church there in return for his maintenance. He was ordained to the full work of the ministry at Bala on 13 June 1827, and on 20 October 1830 married Mary Roberts of Shrewsbury (d. 1879). During his stay in Shrewsbury Rees rapidly won a position as one of the foremost preachers of his connection, and from this time until his death was almost always to be heard at the great preaching meetings of the North Wales Association. At the end of 1836 he accepted the superintendence of the Calvinistic Methodist churches in Liverpool, where he spent the rest of his life. He died on 18 February 1869 at Benarth, near Conway, his son-in-law's house, and was buried in Llan Dysilio churchyard, near Menai Bridge. He left one daughter, Anne, the wife of Mr. Richard Davies of Treborth, lord lieutenant of Anglesey.

Rees devoted himself to the two duties of preaching and connectional administration. After the death of John Elias in 1841 he was for a quarter of a century the recognised leader of the Calvinistic Methodists of North Wales, and had the largest share in forming the policy of the northern association. As a preacher he had scarcely a rival in the denomination, his sermons being marked by careful preparation, closeness of texture, and purity of diction, coupled with great earnestness and force. He distrusted rhetorical effect. A selection of his sermons was published at Holywell, in three volumes (1872, 1875, 1881).
