= William Rees (Gwilym Hiraethog) =

Welsh minister and writer

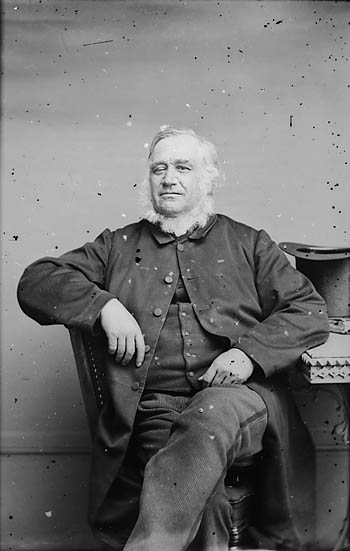
Dr William Rees (Gwilym Hiraethog)

William Rees (8 November 1802 – 8 November 1883), usually known in Wales by his bardic name of Gwilym Hiraethog, was a Welsh poet and author, one of the major figures of Welsh literature during the 19th century.

Gwilym Hiraethog took his pseudonym from his birthplace, a farm called Chwibren-isaf, near Llansannan, on Mynydd Hiraethog in Denbighshire. He was the second son of Anne and David Rees, a farmer. Age three, he contracted smallpox and lost the sight in his right eye. He worked on the farm and as a shepherd in his teens. His older brother Henry Rees became a Calvinistic Methodist leader.

Largely self-educated, having only attended the village school in winter, Rees was a polymath, who took an interest in astronomy and political science as well as being a Nonconformist minister and a leading literary figure. A neighbour, Robert ap Dafydd of Cilfach Lwyd, taught Rees the rules of Welsh prosody and Rees went on to win a prize at the 1826 Brecon eisteddfod for a cywydd (poem) on the Battle of Trafalgar and the death of Nelson. This gave him public attention. He joined the Independents church and became a popular preacher in the Welsh language. He became a minister in 1831 in Mostyn, later working in Denbigh and Liverpool.

In 1843, he founded the Welsh language journal Yr Amserau ("The Times") in Liverpool. He used the newspaper to campaign for the disestablishment of the Church in Wales. Rees also penned the hymn text of Dyma gariad fel y moroedd (Here is love, vast as the ocean), which was first published in 1847 but strongly associated with the 1904-1905 Welsh revival. His Helyntion Bywyd Hen Deiliwr (Predicaments of an Old Tailor) (1877) was a pioneering attempt to fashion a Welsh-language novel.

He retired in 1875 soon after the death of his wife Ann and moved to Chester to live with his daughter, where he died on his birthday on 8 November 1883.

== Works ==
=== Poetry ===
- Emmanuel (1861)
- Tŵr Dafydd sef, Salmau Dafydd (1875) (Metrical Psalms)
- Gweithiau Barddonol Gwilym Hiraethog (1855)

=== Prose ===
- Llythyrau 'Rhen Ffarmwr (1878)

=== Novels ===
- Aelwyd F'Ewythr Robert (1852)
- Helyntion Bywyd Hen Deiliwr (1877)

=== Drama ===
- Y Dydd Hwnnw
