= Welsh literature =

Welsh literature is any literature originating from Wales or by Welsh writers:

- Welsh-language literature for literature in the Welsh language
- Welsh literature in English for literature in the English language
