= Holyhead Mail Pier Lighthouse =

Inactive lighthouse in Anglesey, Wales

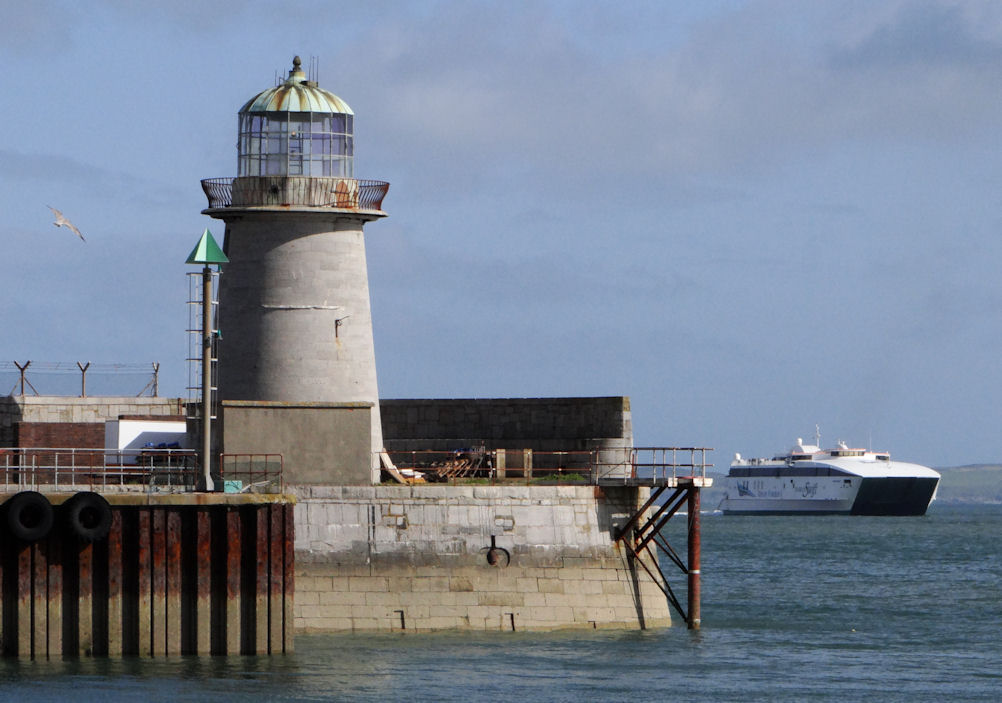
- Location: Holyhead; Anglesey; Wales
- Coordinates: 53°18′51″N 4°37′12″W

Tower
- Constructed: 1821
- Construction: Stone tower
- Height: 15 metres (49 ft)
- Shape: Broad tapered cylindrical tower with balcony and lantern
- Markings: Unpainted tower
- Heritage: Grade II listed building, National Monuments of Wales

Light
- Deactivated: Inactive

Holyhead Mail Pier or Admiralty Pier Lighthouse on Salt Island, Anglesey, is an inactive lighthouse which was designed by the civil engineer John Rennie in 1821. It was built in the early 19th century to help guide shipping into the newly constructed harbour, now known as the Port of Holyhead, which acted as the terminus for the packet service between England and Ireland. It is the last of a series of three lighthouses located on Salt Island.

== History ==
The lighthouse was built as part of extensive improvements to Holyhead Harbour authorised by the Holyhead Harbour Act 1810 (50 Geo. 3. c. 93). The harbour was the mail packet station for packet boats crossing to Ireland, providing a postal service between Dublin and London, via Telford’s new turnpike road which was completed in 1826. Howth Harbour Lighthouse is a matching tower in Howth, Ireland, also designed by Rennie, for the other terminal of the Irish packet steamer.

The lighthouse is of national significance as one of John Rennie's surviving works. He was one of the most eminent engineers of the world's first Industrial Revolution. Of particular importance, in a Welsh context, is the early date of the lighthouse lantern, which was originally lit by gas. Before the conversion to electricity a gas works was located on the island to power the lighthouse, the piers and even part of Holyhead itself. The tower survives intact and has elegantly curved gallery railings, similar to those at Bardsey Lighthouse. It is no longer in use, although it is used as a navigation reference for sailors.

== Listed buildings ==
The tower is a Grade II listed building, and was "Listed as an integral part of the important harbour scheme designed by Rennie, and as a good and well-preserved example of an early C19 harbour light."

At the landward end of the pier is the Grade II* Admiralty Arch built to commemorate the visit of King George IV of the United Kingdom to Holyhead in 1821. The King was due to sail from Holyhead to Howth in Ireland on the royal yacht, but due to bad weather he travelled on the steam packet Lightning instead.

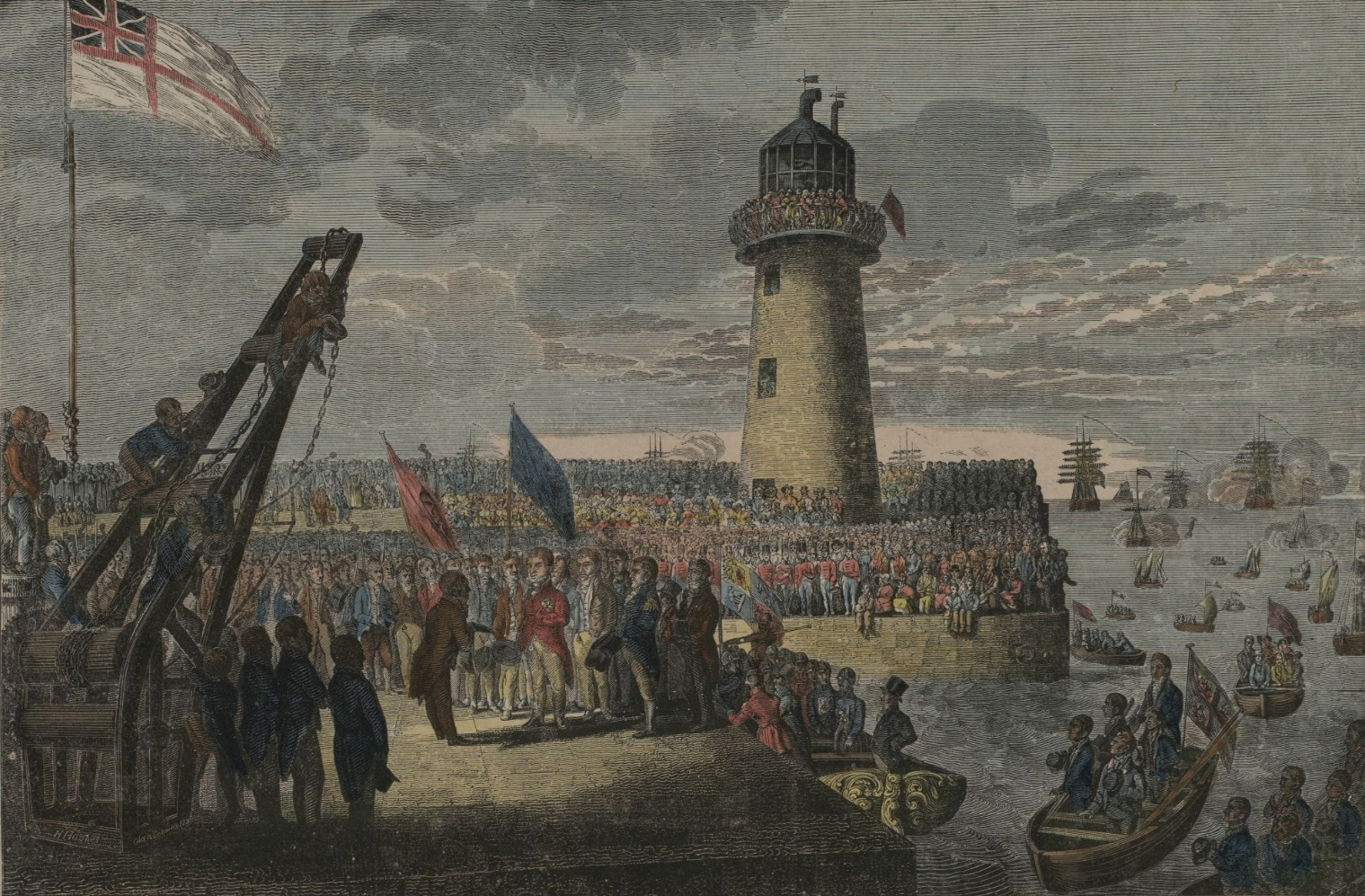
George IV, at Holyhead, August 1821 with lighthouse

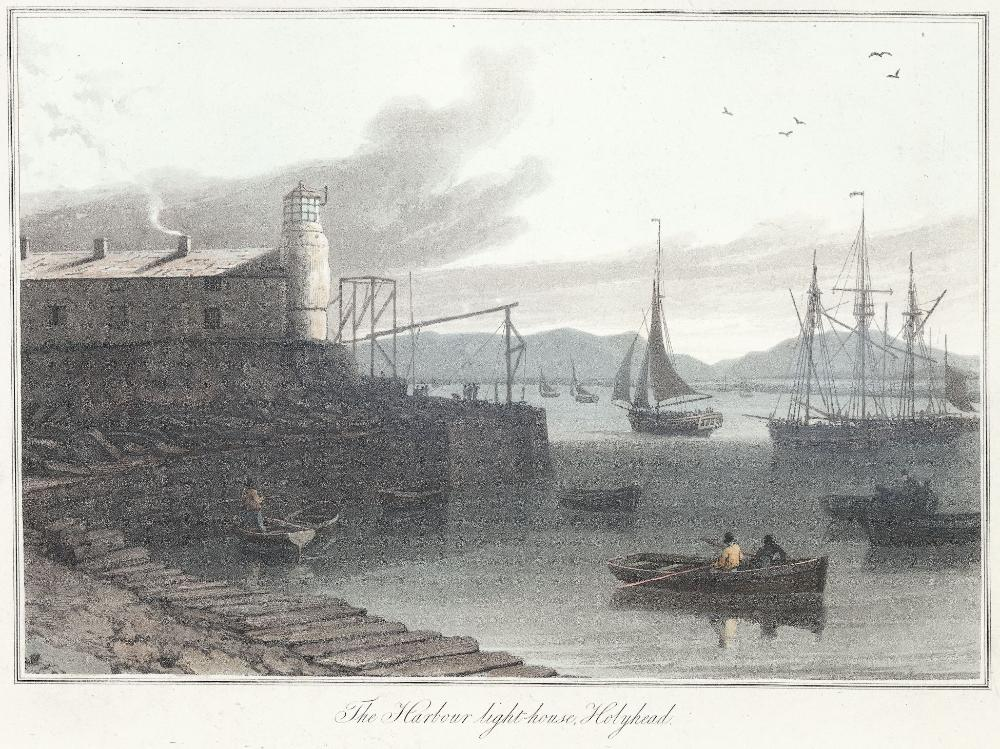
1815 print showing the earlier lighthouse that was replaced by the 1821 tower

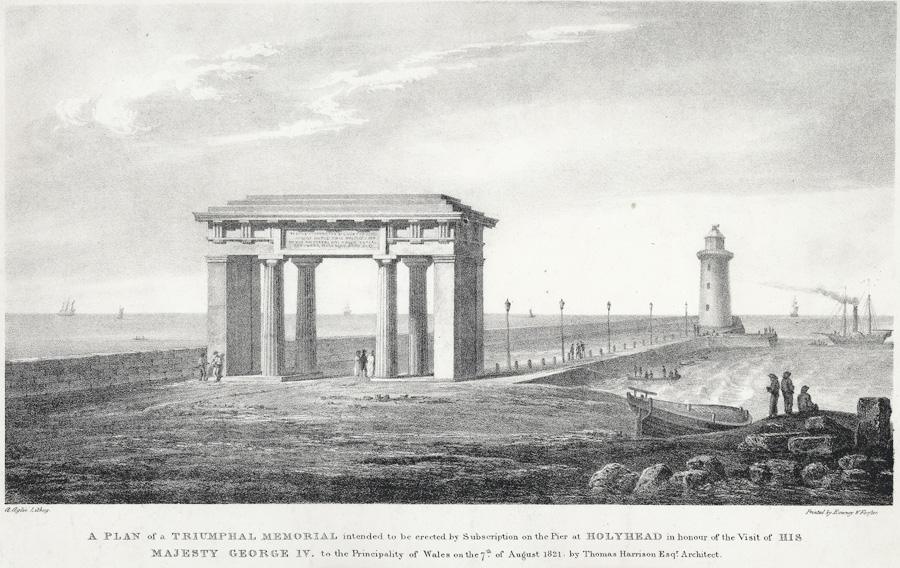
A plan of the triumphal arch, pier and lighthouse

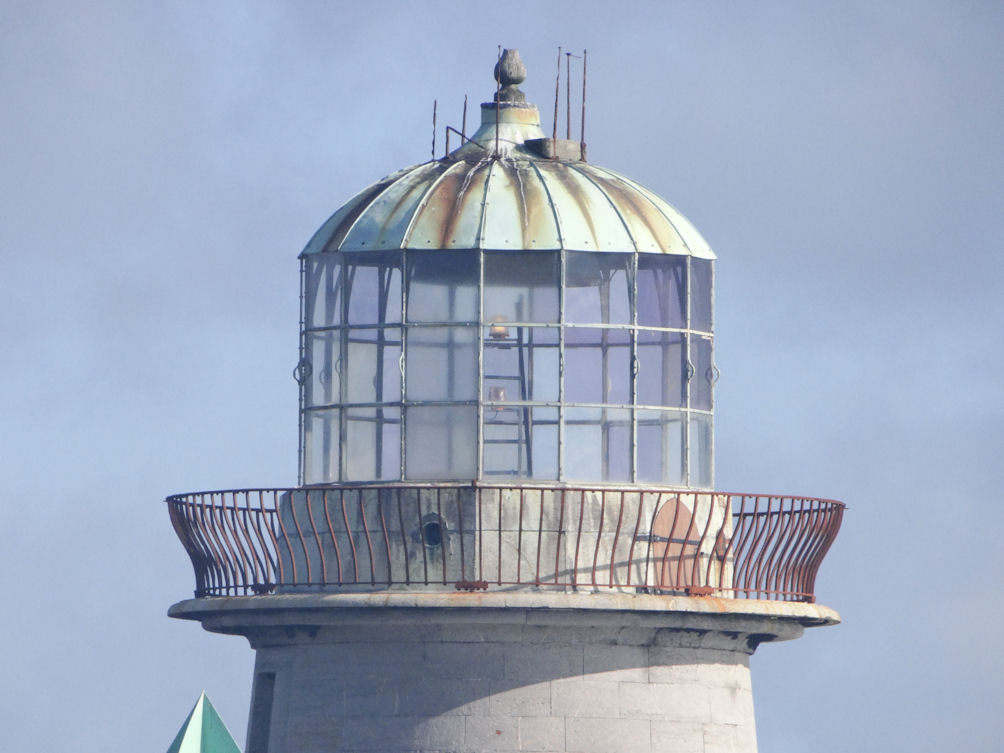
Detail of the lantern room in 2013

== See also ==
- List of lighthouses in Wales
