= List of lighthouses in Wales =

Major lighthouses of Wales, Smalls Lighthouse not shown.

This is a list of lighthouses in Wales. The list runs anticlockwise from north-east to south-east Wales.

== Active lighthouses ==
Name	Image	Location	Year built	Tower height (in metres)	Focal height (Note: height of the light above water level) (in metres)	Range (in nautical miles)
Trwyn Du Lighthouse		Llangoed	1838	29	19	12
Point Lynas Lighthouse		Llaneilian	1835	11	39	18
Skerries Lighthouse		Cylch-y-Garn	1717	23	36 (white), 26 (red)	20 (white), 10 (red)
Holyhead Breakwater Lighthouse		Holyhead, Holyhead	1873	19	21	14
South Stack Lighthouse		Isle of Anglesey	1809	28	60	24
Twr Bach Llanddwyn Island Lighthouse		Rhosyr	18th century	5	12	7 (white), 4 (red)
Bardsey Lighthouse		Aberdaron	1821	30	39	26
St Tudwal’s Lighthouse		Llanengan, Gwynedd	1877	11	46	14 (white), 10 (red)
Strumble Head Lighthouse		Pembrokeshire	1908	17	45	26
South Bishop Lighthouse		St David's and the Cathedral Close	1839	11	44	16
Smalls Lighthouse		Marloes and St Brides	1861	41	36 (white), 33 (red)	18 (white), 13 (red)
Skokholm Lighthouse		Marloes and St Brides	1916	18	54	8 (white & red)
St. Ann's Head Lighthouse		Pembrokeshire	1841	13	48	18 (white), 17 (red)
Great Castle Head Light		St Ishmael's	1870	5	27	5 (white), 3 (red & green)
Little Castle Head Light		Pembrokeshire		26	53	15
Watwick Point Beacon		Pembrokeshire, Dale	1970	50	80	15
West Blockhouse Point Beacons		Pembrokeshire	1957	14		
Caldey Lighthouse		Tenby	1829	16	65	13 (white), 9 (red)
Saundersfoot Lighthouse		Pembrokeshire	1848	5	7	7
Burry Port Lighthouse		Pembrey and Burry Port Town	1842		7	7
Mumbles Lighthouse		Swansea, Mumbles	1794	17	35	15
Porthcawl Lighthouse		Porthcawl	1860	9	10	6 (white), 4 (red & green)
Nash Point Lighthouse		St Donats	1831	37	56	21 (white), 16 (red)
Flat Holm Lighthouse		Butetown	1737	30	50	15 (white), 12 (red)
Barry Lighthouse		The Vale of Glamorgan	1890	9	12	10
Monkstone Lighthouse		The Vale of Glamorgan	1839	23	13	12
East Usk Lighthouse		Newport	1893	11	11	11 (white), 10 (red & green)
Charston Rock Lighthouse						

== Inactive lighthouses ==
Name	Image	Location	Year built	Decommissioned	Tower height (in metres)
Point of Ayr Lighthouse		Llanasa		1844	18
Great Orme Lighthouse		Llandudno		1985	11
Amlwch Lighthouse		Amlwch Community	1817	1972	11
Holyhead Mail Pier Lighthouse		Holyhead, Holyhead			15
Twr Mawr Llanddwyn Lighthouse		Rhosyr		1975	10
St. Ann's Head Lighthouse		Pembrokeshire	1844	1910	13
Whiteford Lighthouse		Llangennith, Llanmadoc and Cheriton	1865	1926	14
Old Nash Point Lighthouse		St Donats		1900s	20
West Usk Lighthouse		Wentlooge		1922	17

== See also ==
- List of lighthouses and lightvessels
- List of lighthouses in England
- List of lighthouses in Scotland
- List of lighthouses in the Isle of Man
- List of lighthouses in Ireland
