= St Ann's Head Lighthouse =

Lighthouse in Pembrokeshire, Wales

St. Ann's Head Lighthouse St. Ann's Low Light
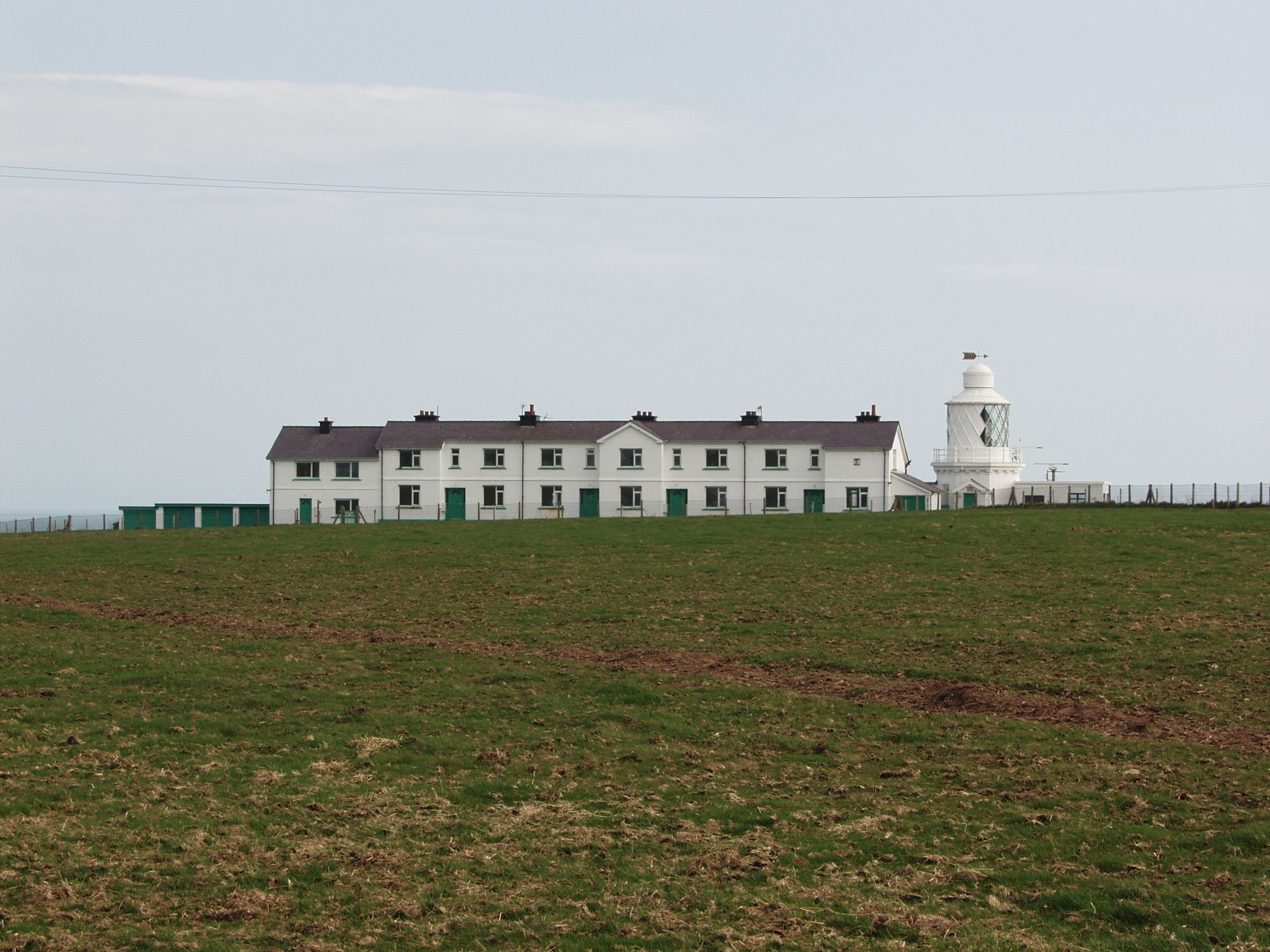
- St. Ann's Head Lighthouse
- Location: Milford Haven; Pembrokeshire; Wales; United Kingdom
- Coordinates: 51.681218°N 5.173675°W

Tower
- Constructed: 1714 (first)
- Construction: masonry tower
- Automated: 1998
- Height: 13 metres (43 ft)
- Shape: octagonal tower with balcony and lantern
- Markings: white tower and lantern
- Operator: Trinity House
- Heritage: National Monuments of Wales

Light
- First lit: 1844 (current)
- Deactivated: 1910
- Focal height: 48 metres (157 ft)
- Lens: First-order catadioptric
- Intensity: 48,700 candela
- Range: 18 nautical miles (33 km; 21 mi)
- Characteristic: Fl WR 5s.

St. Ann's Head Lighthouse is a lighthouse that overlooks the entrance to the Milford Haven Waterway, one of Britain's deep water harbours, from St. Ann's Head near Dale in Pembrokeshire.

== Lighthouse ==
The lighthouse is intended to guide ships around a number of rocky shoals that cause a hazard to shipping entering the Haven as well as Crow's rock. The current lighthouse was completed in 1844, at which time it was known as St. Ann's Low Light, and was commissioned by John Knott, senior lighthouse keeper with Trinity House. The first lighthouse on the site was built in 1714.

The present operational tower is 13 metres (43 ft) in height and is painted white. Visible is Skokholm Lighthouse on the small island of Skokholm 8 kilometres (5.0 mi) to the west.

== See also ==
- List of lighthouses in Wales
