= Watwick Point Beacon =

Lighthouse in Pembrokeshire, Wales

Watwick Point Beacon Range Rear
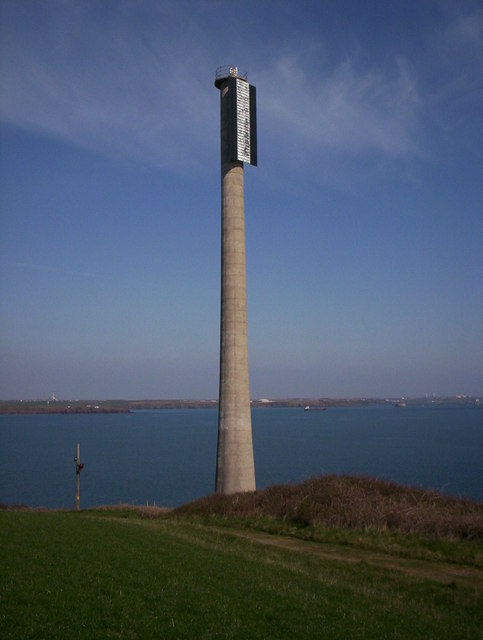
- The Watwick Beacon in 2007
- Location: Watwick Point; Dale; Pembrokeshire; Wales; United Kingdom
- Coordinates: 51.696247°N 5.153987°W

Tower
- Constructed: 1970
- Construction: reinforced concrete tower
- Automated: 1970
- Height: 50 metres (160 ft)
- Shape: tapered cylindrical tower with platform
- Markings: unpainted tower with rectangular slatted daymark painted black with a white vertical stripe on the range line
- Operator: Milford Haven Port Authority
- Racon: Y

Light
- Focal height: 80 metres (260 ft)
- Lens: sealed beam
- Range: 15 nautical miles (28 km; 17 mi)
- Characteristic: F w

Watwick Point Beacon is a leading light, which is a type of lighthouse, located near Dale, Pembrokeshire, in Wales. It is designed to lead ships into Milford Haven in conjunction with the West Blockhouse Point Beacons. It is situated about half a mile to the north-east of West Blockhouse Point.

Watwick Point Beacon comprises a circular pinkish-white tower. A large board at the top of the tower contains a vertical black and white daymark. The mains-powered single-beam light is mounted on a gallery on top of the tower and gives out a flashing white light which is visible for 15 nautical miles (28 km; 17 mi). The height of the tower is 159 feet (48 m) and the light shines out at this height.

== See also ==
- List of lighthouses in Wales
