= Burry Port Lighthouse =

Lighthouse in Carmarthenshire, Wales

Burry Port Lighthouse Goleudy Porth Tywyn
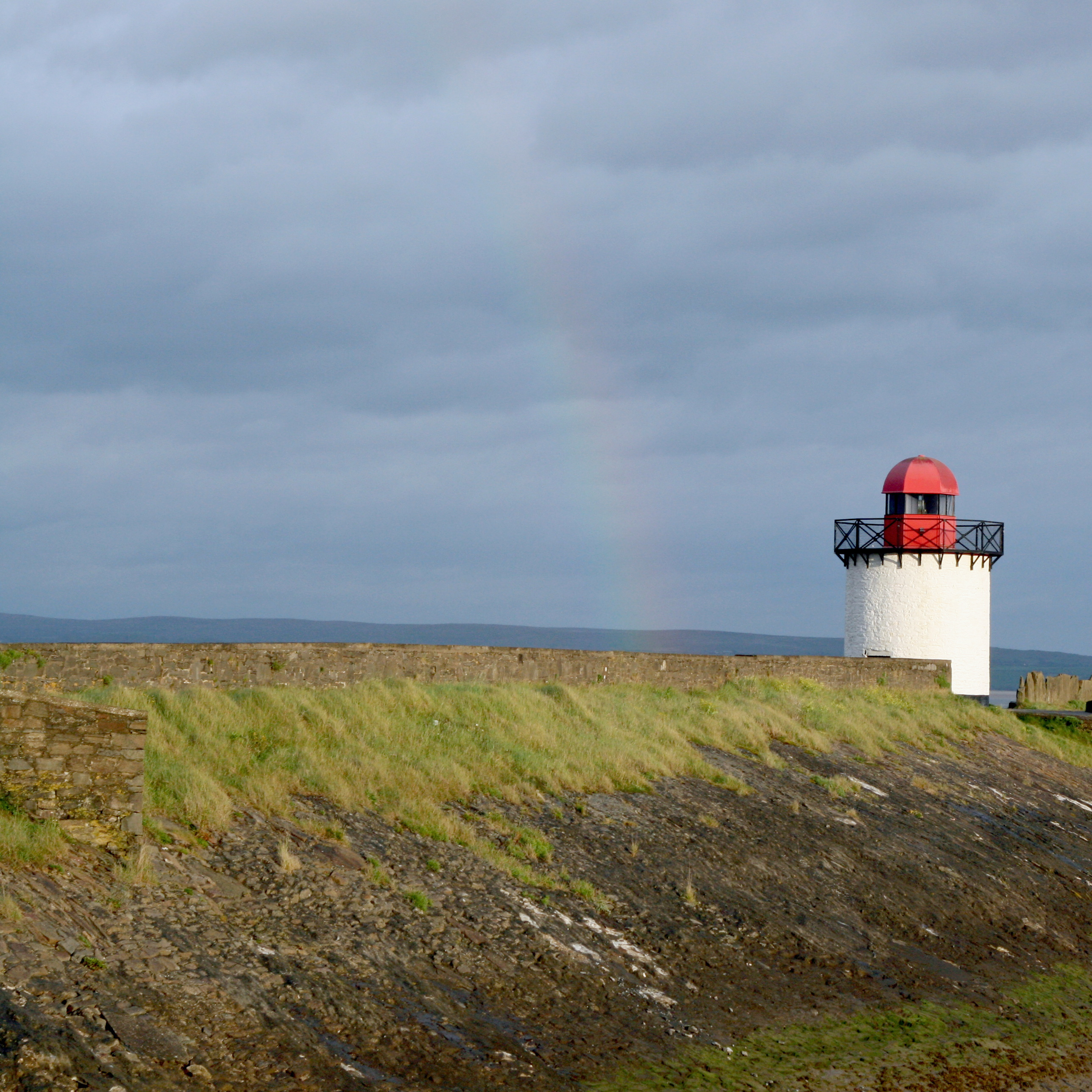
- Burry Port Lighthouse
- Location: Burry Port; Carmarthenshire; Wales; United Kingdom
- Coordinates: 51.6775°N 4.2512°W

Tower
- Constructed: 1842
- Construction: brick tower
- Height: 6 metres (20 ft)
- Shape: broad cylindrical tower with balcony and lantern
- Markings: white tower, black gallery, red lantern
- Operator: Carmarthenshire County Council
- Heritage: Grade II listed building, National Monuments of Wales

Light
- First lit: relit 1996
- Focal height: 7 metres (23 ft)
- Range: 15 nautical miles (28 km; 17 mi)
- Characteristic: Fl W 5s.

Burry Port Lighthouse (Welsh: Goleudy Porth Tywyn) is a lighthouse in Burry Port.

Burry Port harbour was built between 1830 and 1836 to replace the harbour at Pembrey, located 400 yards to the west. Burry Port was once the main coal exporting port for the nearby valleys, but the dock now houses the only marina in Carmarthenshire, and the harbour was dredged especially for this purpose.

== History ==
Burry Port Lighthouse is a harbour light with a reflector, and is situated on the west breakwater of the outer harbour. It was built in 1842 and was erected with the permission of Trinity House and maintained at the joint expense of the proprietors of Burry Port Harbour and the Commissioners of the Burry Navigation. The light consists of a 24 ft white painted, stone, circular tower with a black gallery and red lantern. As this was a harbour light, the annual cost of its upkeep, which cost £32 in 1844, was not met by a direct charge to shipping. However, in 1845 the superintendent of Burry Port Harbour reported that buoyage dues not exceeding 1d a ton had been regularly charged since the passing of an Act for the ‘Improvement of the Navigation of the Rivers Bury, Loughor and Lliedi’ on 2 July 1813.

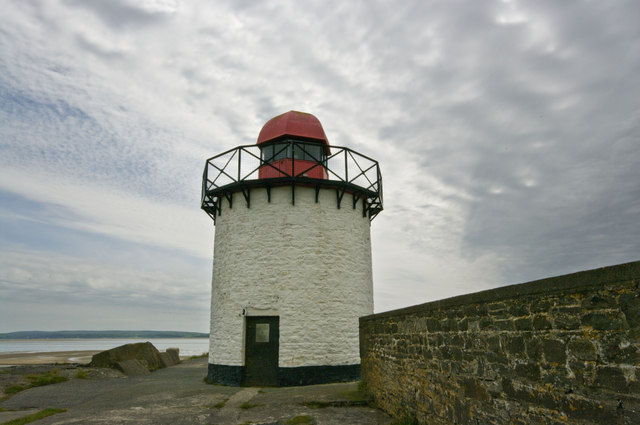
The lighthouse in 2009

In 1995–6, Llanelli Borough Training, with the support of the Burry Port Yacht Club, restored the lighthouse and Trinity House donated a new light. The restored lighthouse is operated by Carmarthenshire County Council and was formally opened on 9 February 1996 by Councillor David T. James, the Mayor of Llanelli. The current white flashing light is visible for fifteen miles and is now an important landmark for the Burry Port Yacht Club and the Burry Port Marina. The lighthouse is accessed via the breakwater. The neighbouring small port of Pembrey Old Harbour also had a lighthouse to guide ships into port. Prior to its construction, the tall chimneys of Court Farm, Pembrey were used as a navigation aid. The lighthouse was used in 2022 as the centrepiece of events in S4C sci-fi drama series Y Goleudy.

== See also ==
- List of lighthouses in Wales
