= Skokholm Lighthouse =

Lighthouse in Pembrokeshire, Wales

Skokholm Lighthouse Ynys Scogholm
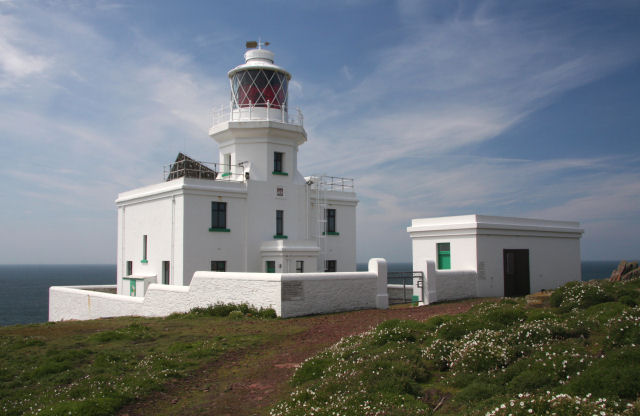
- Skokholm Lighthouse
- Location: Skokholm Island; Pembrokeshire; Wales; United Kingdom
- Coordinates: 51.693849°N 5.286933°W

Tower
- Constructed: 1916
- Construction: masonry tower
- Automated: 1983
- Height: 18 metres (59 ft)
- Shape: octagonal tower with balcony and lantern on a 2-storey keeper’s house
- Markings: white tower and lantern
- Power source: solar power
- Operator: Wildlife Trust of South and West Wales
- Heritage: Grade II listed building

Light
- Focal height: 54 metres (177 ft)
- Lens: 4th Order (250mm) catadioptric rotating
- Intensity: 742 candela
- Range: 8 nautical miles (15 km; 9.2 mi)
- Characteristic: Fl WR 10s.

Skokholm Lighthouse is a lighthouse on Skokholm Island, just off the southwest coast of Pembrokeshire, Wales.

This small island is a Site of Special Scientific Interest. It is owned and managed by the Wildlife Trust of South and West Wales and is the site of the United Kingdom's first bird observatory. A great variety of birds can be found on this uninhabited island.

== History ==
The present lighthouse was constructed over several years up to 1915 and was officially opened in 1916. Forming a triangle of lights with South Bishop and the Smalls to protect shipping moving into and out of Milford Haven and the Bristol Channel, the lighthouse shines 20 miles (32 km).

Construction of the present lighthouse was only enabled after the construction of a new jetty. This enabled building materials to be landed, which were then moved to the site using a narrow gauge railway, initially powered by a donkey, then a pony, and finally a tractor. Once in operation, relief was provided by boat from Holyhead. Automated in 1983, it is now monitored and controlled from the Trinity House Operations Control Centre at Harwich in Essex.

== See also ==
- List of lighthouses in Wales
- Trinity House
