= Bardsey Lighthouse =

Lighthouse in Gwynedd, Wales

Bardsey Lighthouse Goleudy Enlli
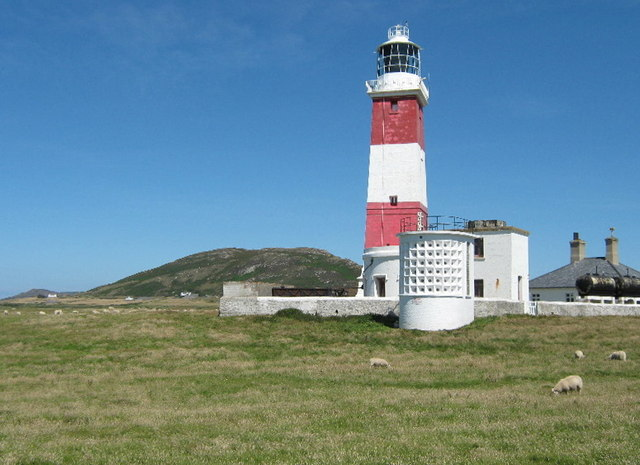
- Bardsey Lighthouse in 2008
- Location: Bardsey Island; Gwynedd; Wales; United Kingdom
- Coordinates: 52.749925°N 4.799754°W

Tower
- Constructed: 1821
- Construction: masonry tower
- Automated: 1987
- Height: 30 metres (98 ft)
- Shape: square tower with balcony and lantern
- Markings: white and red horizontal bands tower, white lantern
- Power source: solar power
- Operator: Bardsey Island Trust
- Heritage: Grade II listed building, National Monuments of Wales

Light
- Focal height: 39 metres (128 ft)
- Lens: LED lantern
- Intensity: 52,277 candela
- Range: 18 nautical miles (33 km; 21 mi)
- Characteristic: Fl R 10s.

Bardsey Lighthouse stands on the southerly tip of Bardsey Island, off the Llŷn Peninsula in Gwynedd, Wales, and guides vessels passing through St George's Channel and the Irish Sea.

== History ==
Application for a light here was first made in 1816 by Lt. Thomas Evans R.N., but several other applications made in 1820 finally resulted in the building of the tower by Trinity House in 1821 at a cost of £5,470 12s 6d plus a further £2,950 16s 7d for the lantern (equivalent to £600,000 and £300,000 in 2023).

Joseph Nelson was the engineer and builder, but the heavy weathered string-course near the base and the blocked and hooded directional-light window show the influence of Daniel Alexander, who succeeded Samuel Wyatt as consulting engineer to Trinity House, and under whom Nelson served. Joseph Nelson is associated with the design of at least fifteen lighthouses, mostly in the Bristol Channel.

In 1987 the lighthouse was converted to automatic operation and up until 1995 was monitored from the Trinity House area control station at Holyhead. It is now monitored from the Trinity House depot at Harwich, with a local part-time attendant carrying out routine maintenance.

== Architecture ==
The lighthouse is built of ashlar limestone and is unplastered inside and out, but painted in red and white bands on the outside. The lighthouse tower is 30 m (98 ft) high and is unusual amongst Trinity House towers of this period in being square in plan (Coquet Lighthouse, Northumberland is also square). Unlike many other lighthouses, it retains its original gallery railings, which are of iron and bellied (i.e. curved out in width at their crowns) towards the top. Other examples include Salt Island Lighthouse, at Holyhead, designed by John Rennie in the same year. The present lantern, fitted in 1856, did not require the removal of the original railings.

The plinth of the tower is 4 m (13 ft) high and elaborately enriched, and at ground level it forms a square of 7.6 m (25 ft) reducing to 6.1 m (20 ft) at the top of the plinth and 4.6 m (15 ft) at the top of the tower below the crowning cornice, which juts out in a square of 5.5 m (18 ft). The walls are 1.2 m (3.9 ft) thick at the base reducing to under 0.9 m (3.0 ft) at the top. Originally, the light comprised reflectors but changed to a dioptric (refracting) mechanism in 1838; the appearance of the original lantern is not known. The present lantern of 1856 is a 4.27 m (14.0 ft) wide chamfered octagon and the light remained fixed, instead of revolving. The present revolving apparatus was installed in 1873 and gives a group of five flashes, originally driven by a vapourising oil-lamp, but replaced by electric in 1973.

The lighthouse is unusual in lacking any sort of harbour or quay facilities. As it is on an established migratory route, the tower has many bird casualties and The Royal Society for the Protection of Birds and Trinity House have tried to help the problem by providing perches on the lantern top and flood-lighting the tower, although this does not seem to have helped.

== See also ==
- List of lighthouses in Wales
