= Admiralty Arch, Holyhead =

Arch in Holyhead, Wales

Coordinates: 53.314221°N 4.624711°W

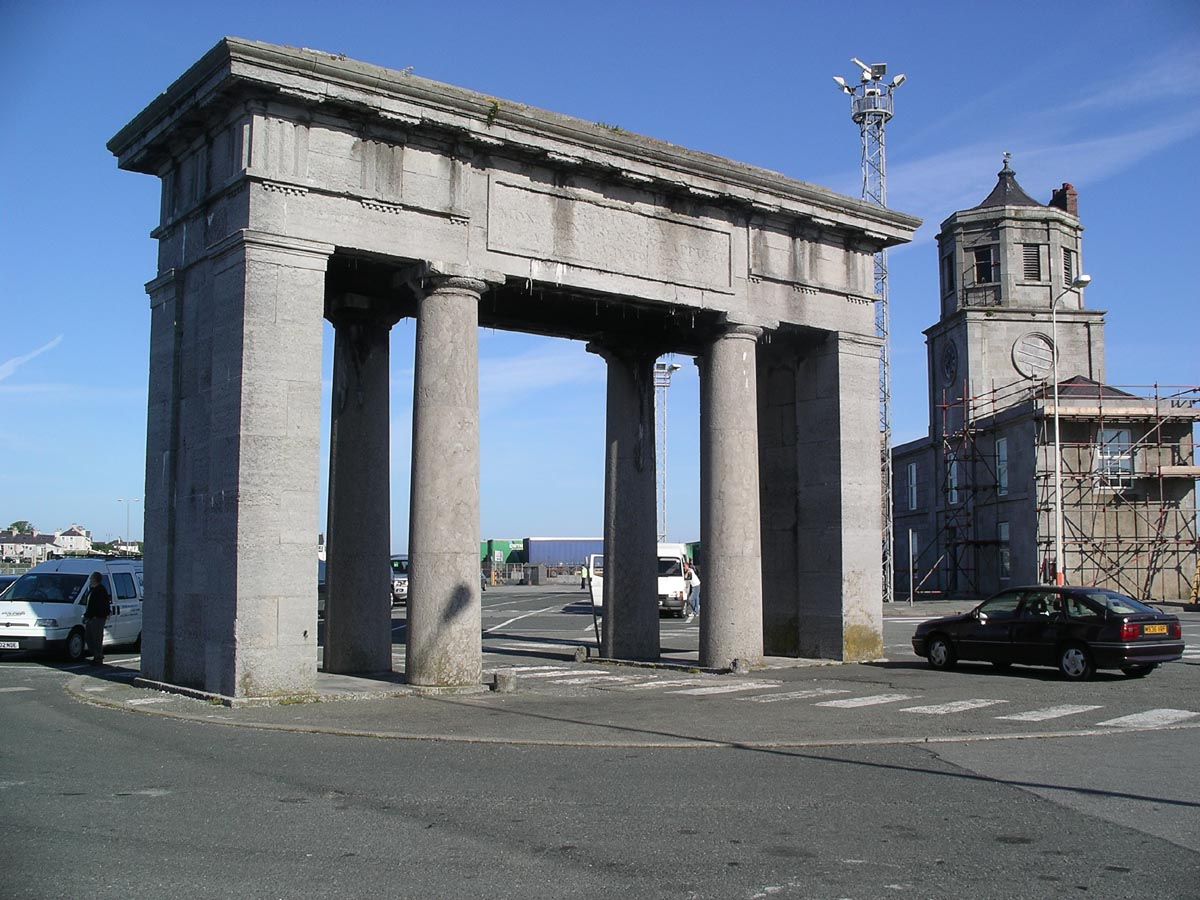
Admiralty arch, Holyhead in 2006

Admiralty Arch, in Holyhead, Anglesey, was built in 1824 to mark the end of Thomas Telford's Holyhead road. The arch was designed by Thomas Harrison and its main purpose was to commemorate the visit of King George IV in August 1821. The King arrived in Holyhead on the royal yacht Royal George on the 7 August, continuing to Plas Newydd where he stopped overnight. He returned the next day to his yacht, but due to poor weather his departure was delayed and the decision was made to transfer to the steam packet Lightning which conveyed him on the 12 August to Howth, near Dublin for his state visit to Ireland. The change to the packet boat was met with widespread approval.

Funded through public subscription the structure took two years to complete and was made of stone quarried at Red Wharf Bay on the eastern side of Anglesey. Due to its history it is known alternatively as the George IV Arch by the Royal Commission on the Ancient and Historical Monuments of Wales or the Triumphal Arch. The Grade II* listed arch is situated within the Port of Holyhead on Ynys Halen and cannot be accessed by the public due to safety reasons. In 2017, plans to move it to a more open location were mooted. At present the best place from which to view it is from St Cybi's Churchyard.

At the seaward end of the Admiralty Pier, beyond the arch, is the Grade II listed Holyhead Mail Pier Lighthouse, completed in 1821 it was designed by John Rennie the Elder as part of extensive improvements to Holyhead Harbour.

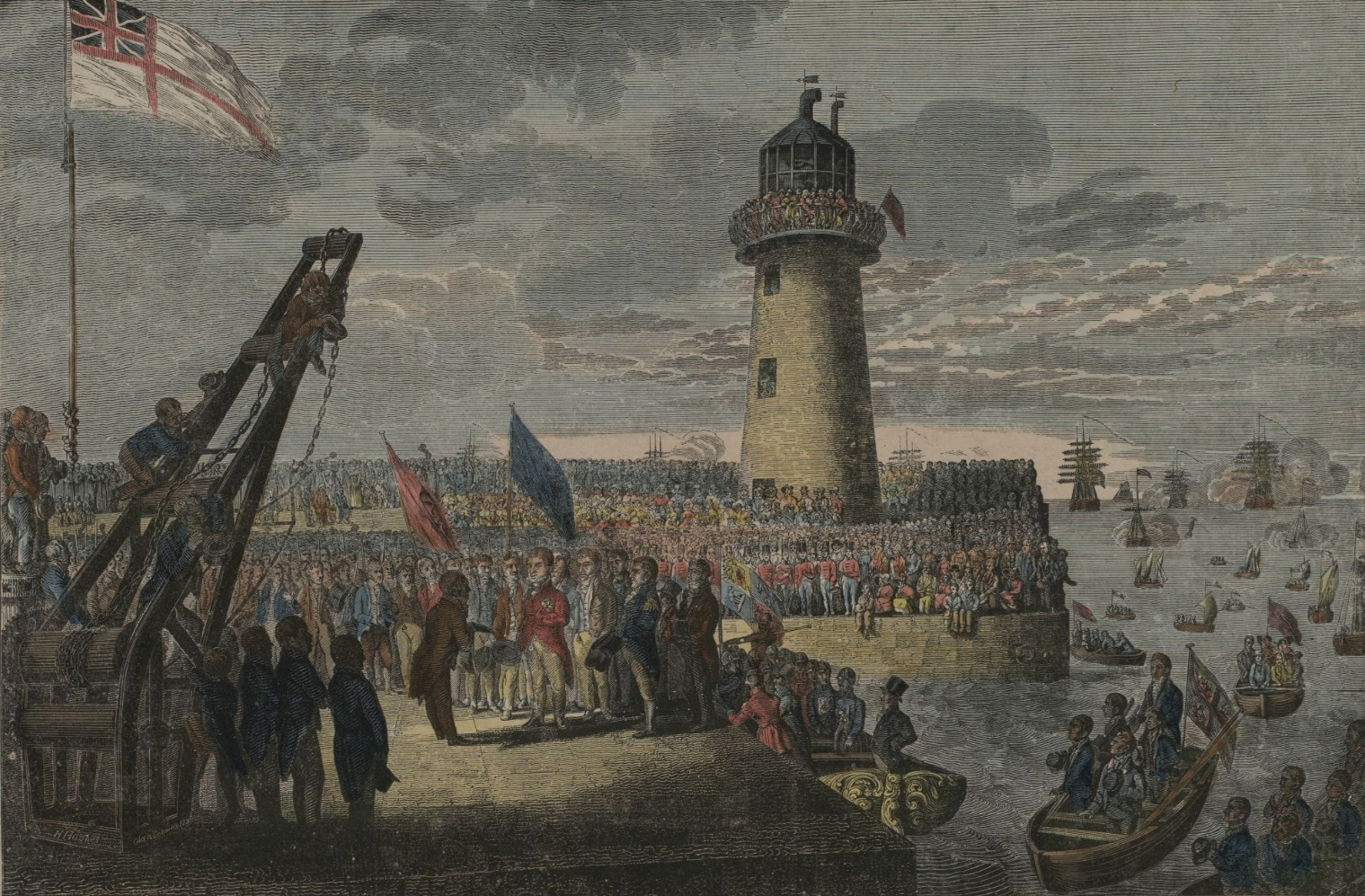
George IV arriving at Holyhead, 7 August 1821

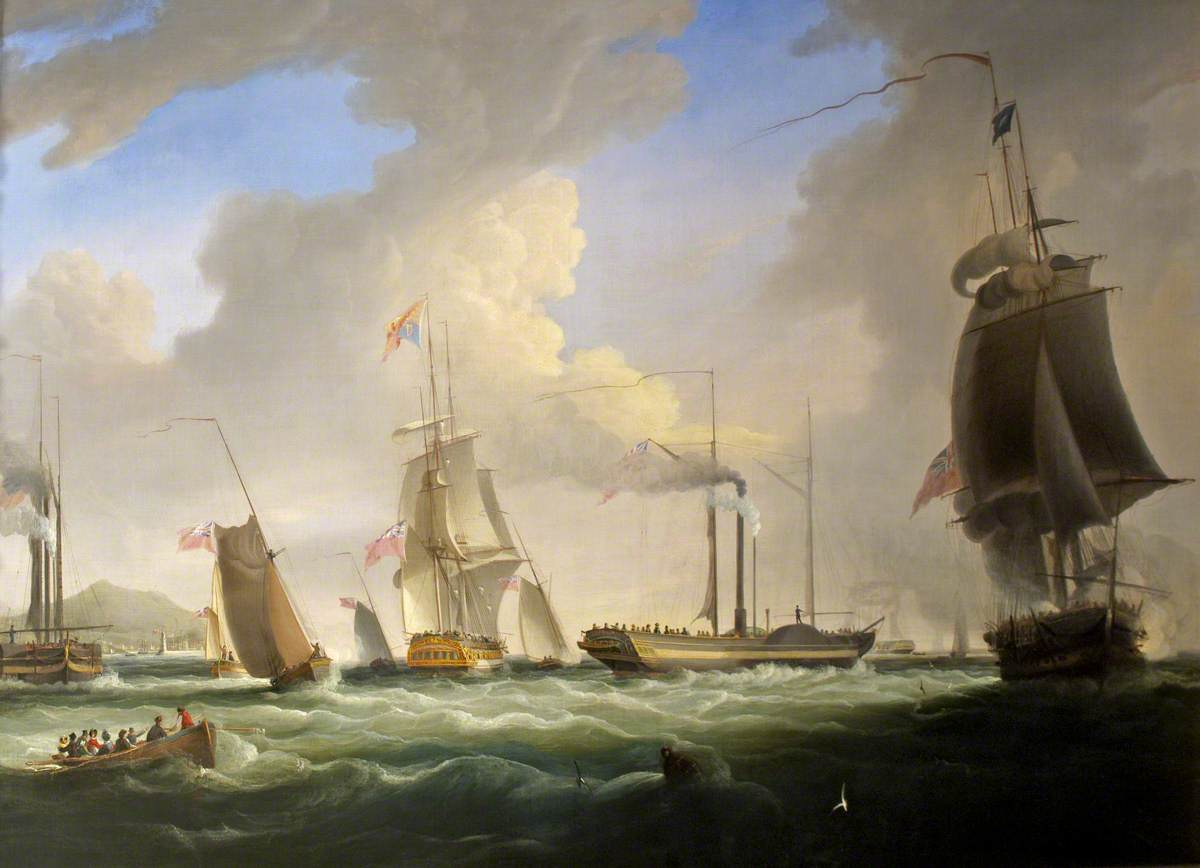
George IV on board the 'Lightning' en route to Dublin, 12 August 1821

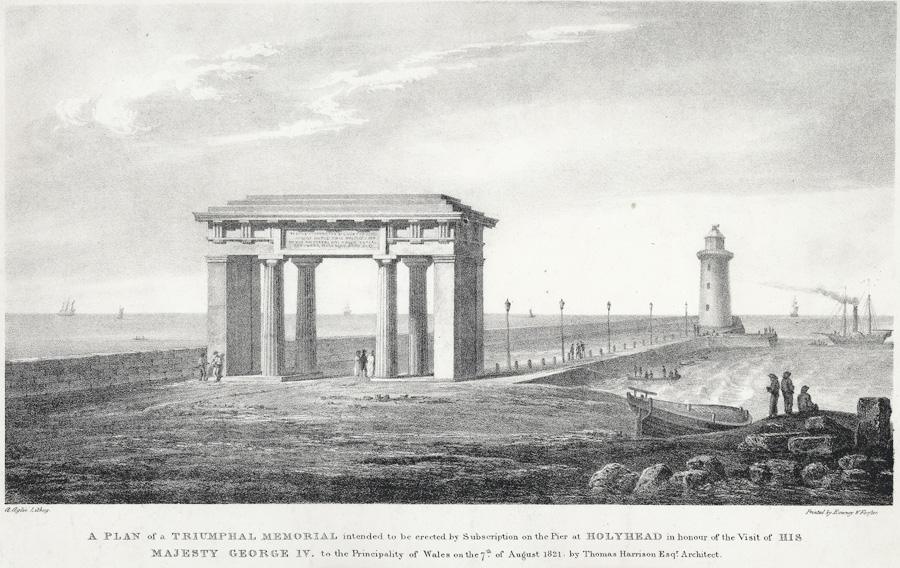
A plan of the triumphal arch, pier and lighthouse
