= Holyhead Breakwater Lighthouse =

Lighthouse in Anglesey, Wales

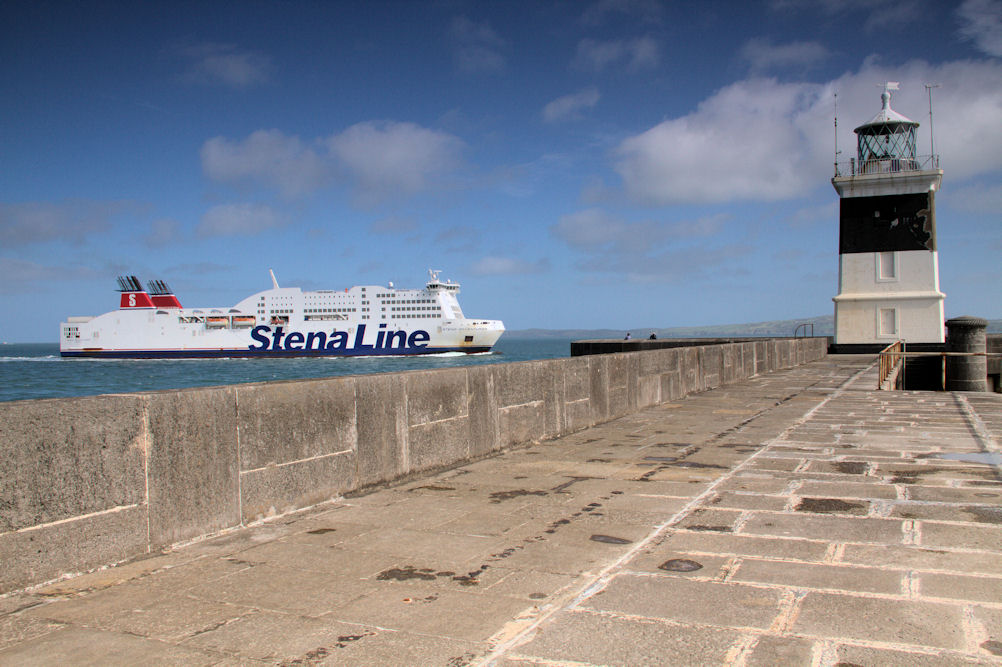
- The Lighthouse on Holyhead Breakwater
- Location: Holyhead; Anglesey; Gwynedd; Wales; United Kingdom
- OS grid: SH 257 848
- Coordinates: 53.330898°N 4.619268°W

Tower
- Constructed: 1873
- Construction: Limestone
- Automated: 1961
- Height: 19 metres (62 ft)
- Shape: Square tower
- Markings: White tower with a broad black band in the upper part, white lantern
- Operator: Stena Lines
- Heritage: Grade II listed building, National Monuments of Wales

Light
- Focal height: 21 metres (69 ft)
- Light source: Main power
- Range: 14 nautical miles (26 km; 16 mi)
- Characteristic: Fl (3) G 10s.

The Holyhead Breakwater Lighthouse stands on the Holyhead Breakwater outside the Welsh port of Holyhead, Anglesey.

== History ==
The structure, which was completed in 1873, was most likely designed by Victorian civil engineer John Hawkshaw after he took control of Holyhead harbour works in 1857. The lighthouse was the last major building completed on the breakwater.

The three-storey black and white tower, unlike many contemporary lighthouses, is square. It measures 22.25 feet (6.78 m) on each side, is 63 feet (19 m) high and rests 70 feet (21 m) above the high-water mark. It has chamfered angles and a stepped plinth set on an oval platform on the breakwater. A square design was chosen because it made the living quarters more comfortable. Much of the original living accommodation inside remains intact.

The tower's external features include a roll-moulded string-course projecting above the first floor level. There is also a moulded cornice which supports a walkway around a circular glass-housed light. The tower is surmounted by a weathervane and finial. The enclosed fresnel lens creates a light with a range of 14 mi (12 nmi; 23 km). This lighthouse is considered architecturally important because it forms part of the ambitious Victorian engineering works to create "harbours of refuge" throughout Great Britain. It is a Grade II listed building.

In the 19th century, packet ships approaching Holyhead in the fog would be warned by a bell operated from the lighthouse. In the late 1870s, this was supplemented with rockets which would complement the gun fired from the fog warning station on North Stack, Anglesey.

The lighthouse was staffed until November 1961, when it was automated. Among the last keepers in the 1950s were Arthur Burgess and David John Williams. The latter later became a speaker for Trinity House giving talks on the service. Like most other lights in Gwynedd, it is now operated from Trinity House's Holyhead Control Centre. Today the upkeep of the lighthouse is the responsibility of Holyhead port authority, which is operated by Stena Line.

== Gallery ==
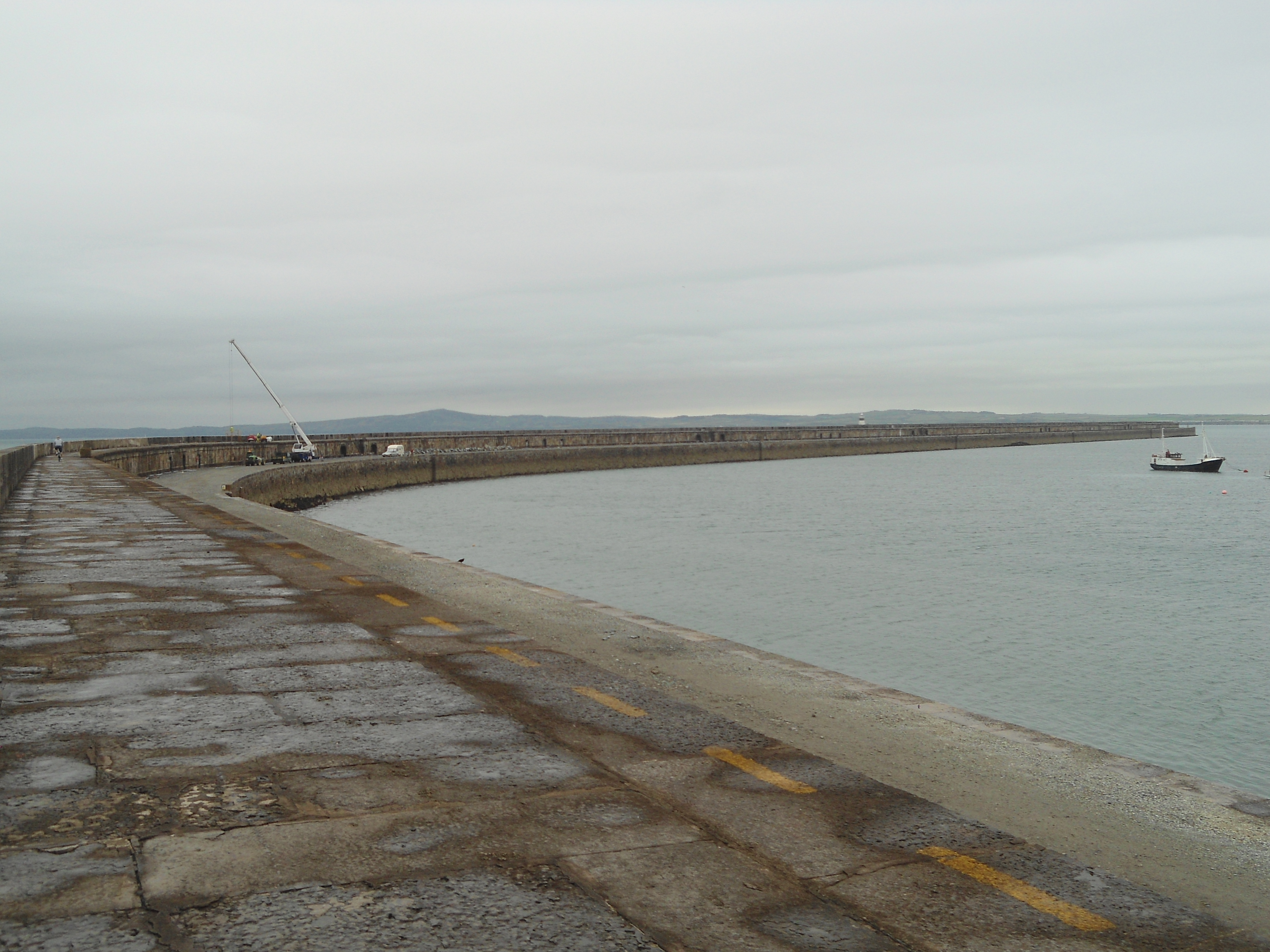
The breakwater seaward from the land end

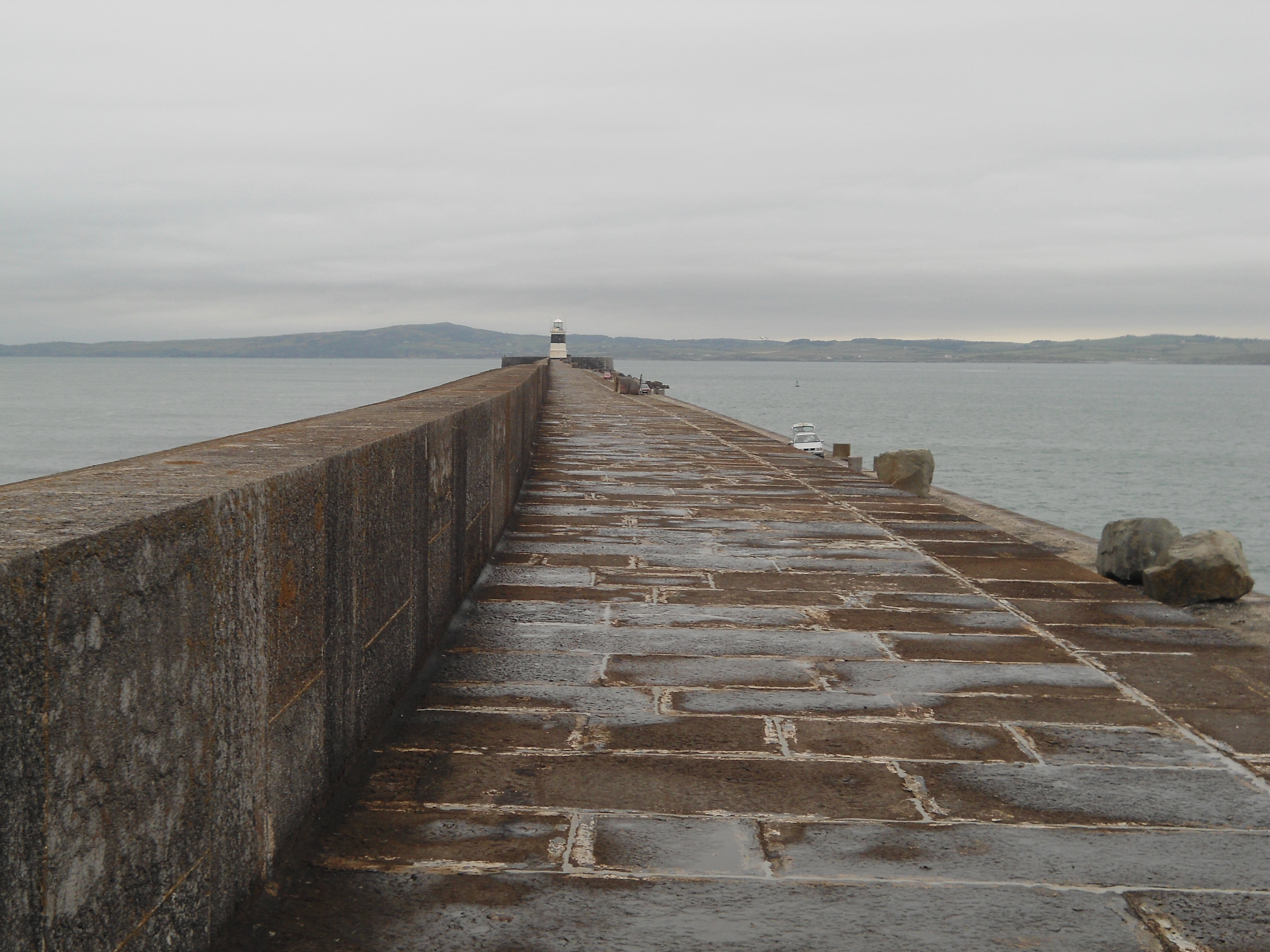
End of the breakwater and lighthouse

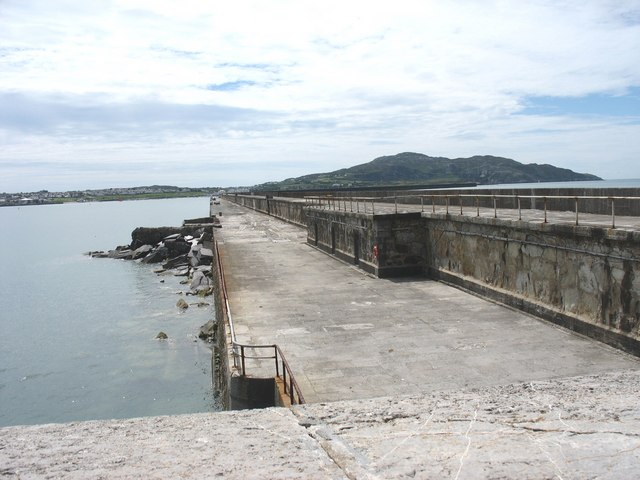
Lower level carried the breakwater railway

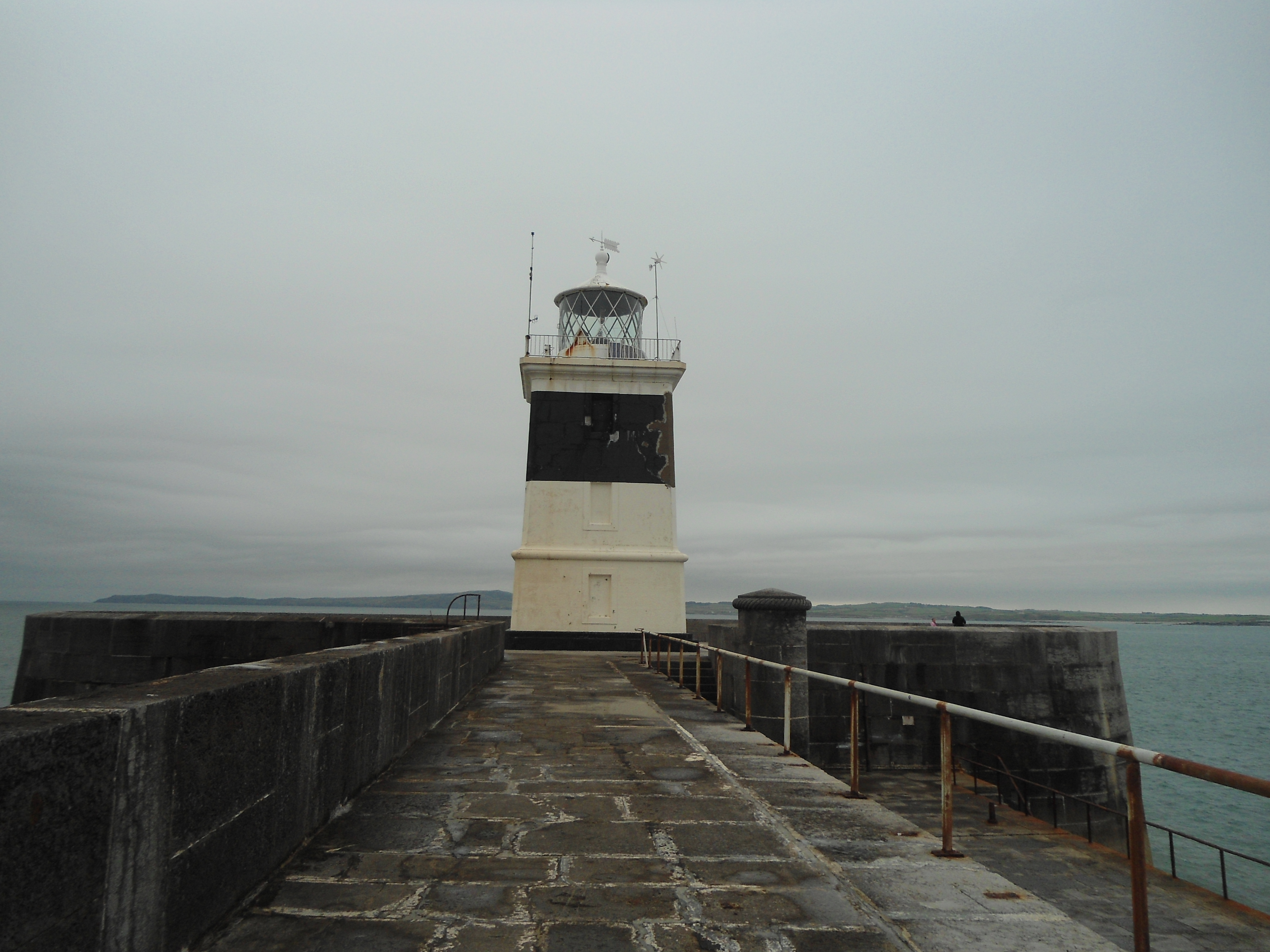
The Lighthouse

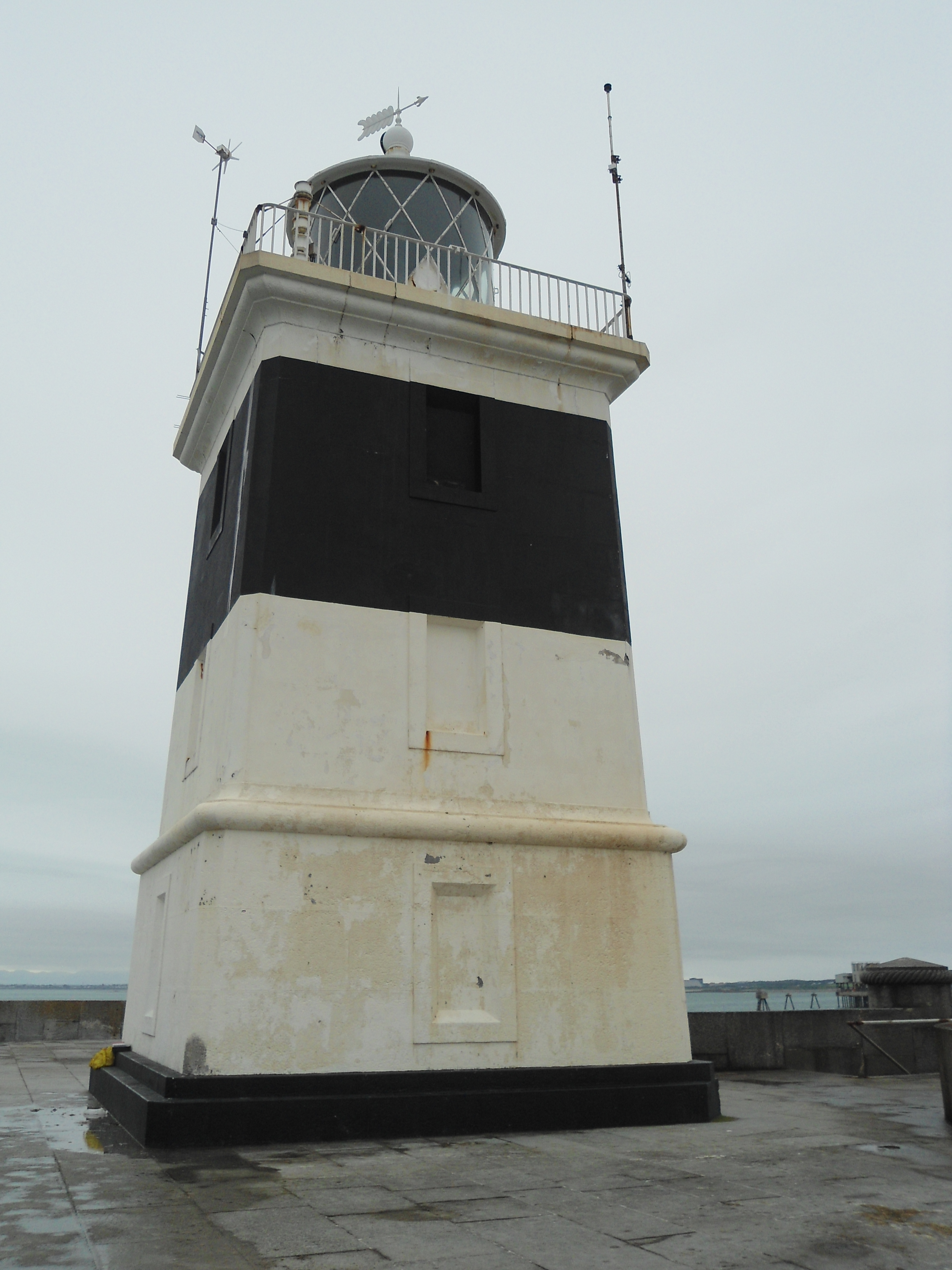
The light was fully automated in 1961

== See also ==
- List of lighthouses in Wales
