= Salt Island, Anglesey =

Island in Anglesey, Wales

Coordinates: 53°18′58″N 4°37′26.5″W

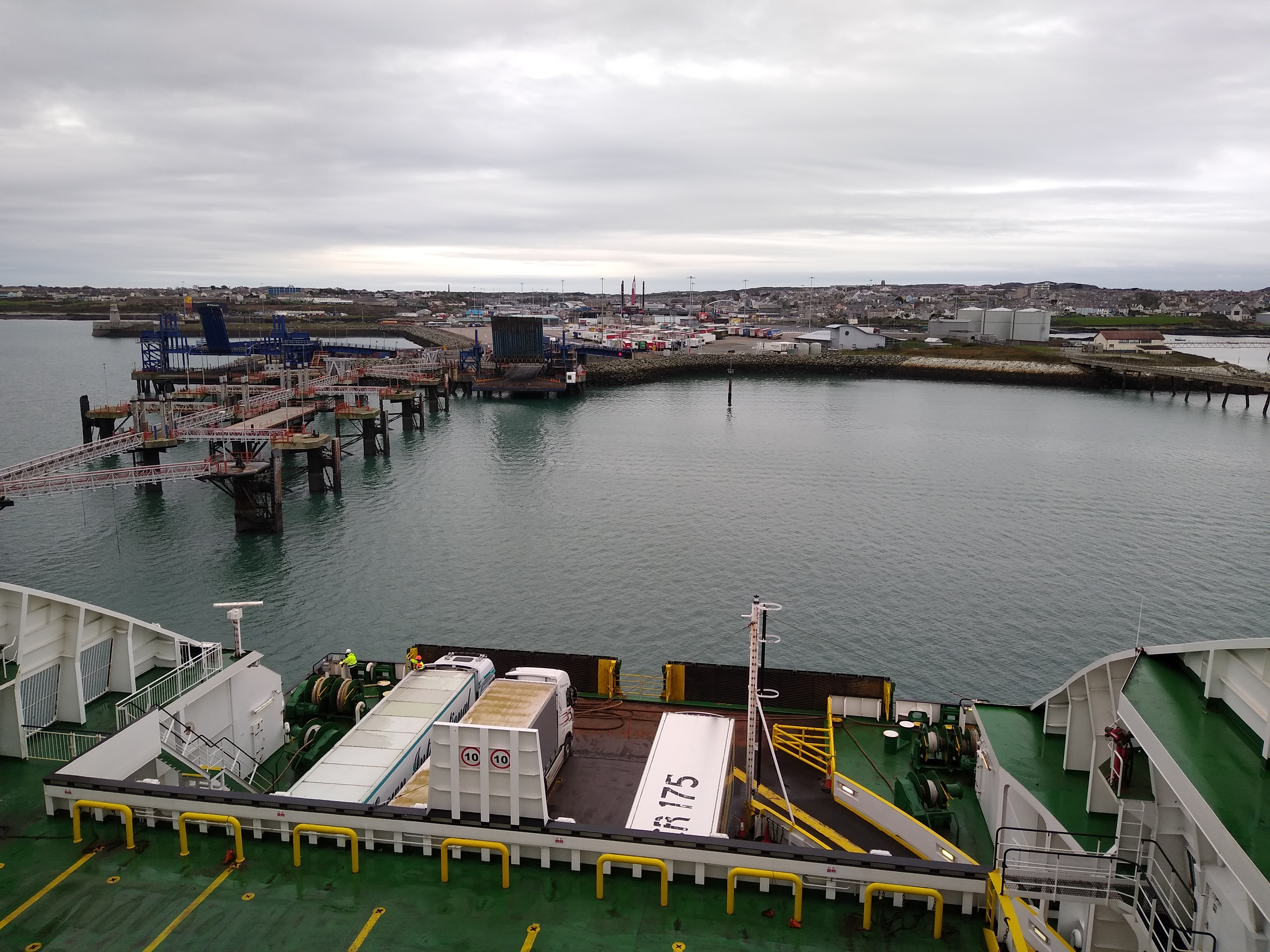
View of Salt Island from an arriving ship

Salt Island (Welsh: Ynys yr Halen) is joined to Holy Island, Anglesey, in North Wales. It is a natural provider of shelter for the town's Old Harbour from the Irish Sea and is part of the Port of Holyhead.

== History ==
The island is believed to have gained its name from a factory on the island which processed sea water in order to extract sea salt.

The Stanley Sailors' Hospital was set up in 1871 by public subscription and initially only treated sailors although it quickly became a general hospital. It was taken over by the National Health Service in 1948 and closed its doors in 1987 and was subsequently demolished.

== Lighthouse ==
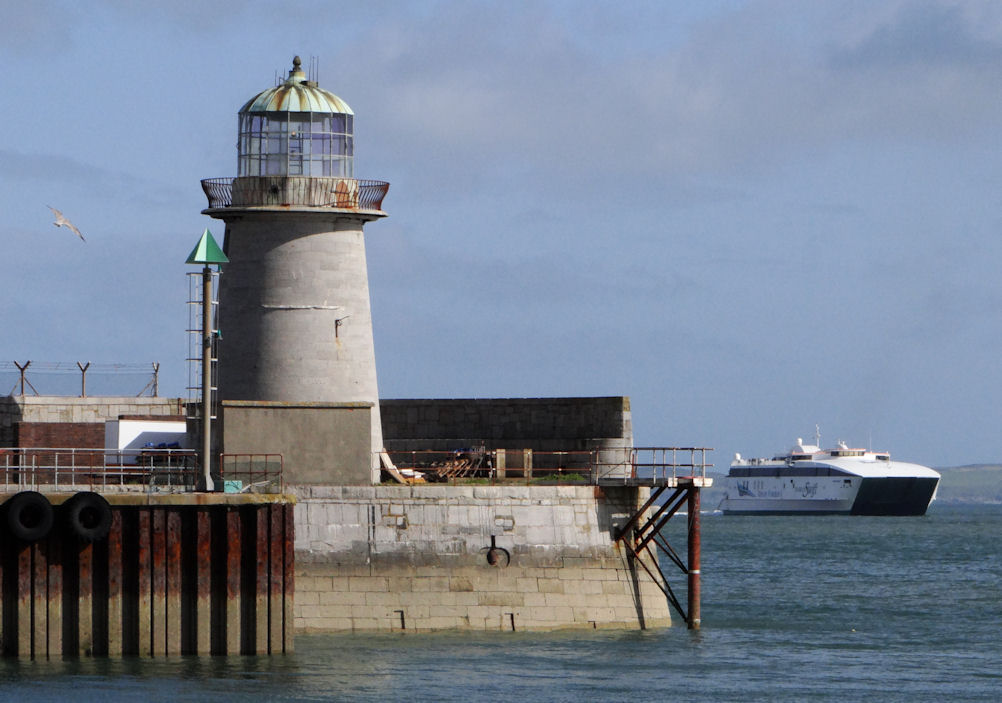
Holyhead Mail Pier Light

There have been three lighthouses located on the island. The current lighthouse is the Holyhead Mail Pier Light. It was designed by John Rennie the Elder in 1821, although he died before supervising the construction. It is one of the few surviving examples of Rennie's work. The lighthouse was superseded by the Holyhead Breakwater Lighthouse when the new harbour opened in 1873.

== Pier ==
The main pier on the island, the Admiralty Pier, was opened in 1821. At around 980 feet (300 m) long it extends east into the sea and has been used to handle ferry traffic since it was opened. Due to its important historical links between Great Britain and Ireland, the pier has twice had royal visitors. On 7 August 1821, King George IV arrived from Ireland. The Arch known as Admiralty Arch was constructed to commemorate this visit. and once in 1898 when Queen Victoria set sail for her last voyage to Ireland.

An inner arm, pairing the existing 5,100-foot (1,600 m) long breakwater (built between 1848 and 1876) was planned from Salt Island. The isolated broad gauge tramway railway from the Holyhead Mountain quarry used to build the former had a branch to Salt Island, via Newry Beach, to facilitate this. Although started with an intention to be 2,100 feet long, the inner arm was never developed beyond a rubble spit at the northern tip of the island. Stone blocks that supported this tramway are still to be found along the upper seafront of Newry Beach. No trace remains of the, presumably, wooden viaduct across the Borth Sach inlet which provided access to the island. During the 1990s the remains of rails were still to be found amongst the large boulders deposited as the foundations for the inner arm.

In more recent times, starting in February 2001, the island was expanded into the sea by the process of land reclamation. In total 11 acres (4.5 ha) was gained at a cost of £10 million. An average of 7,000 tonnes of rock and mud was extracted per day during the process.

== Transport and access ==
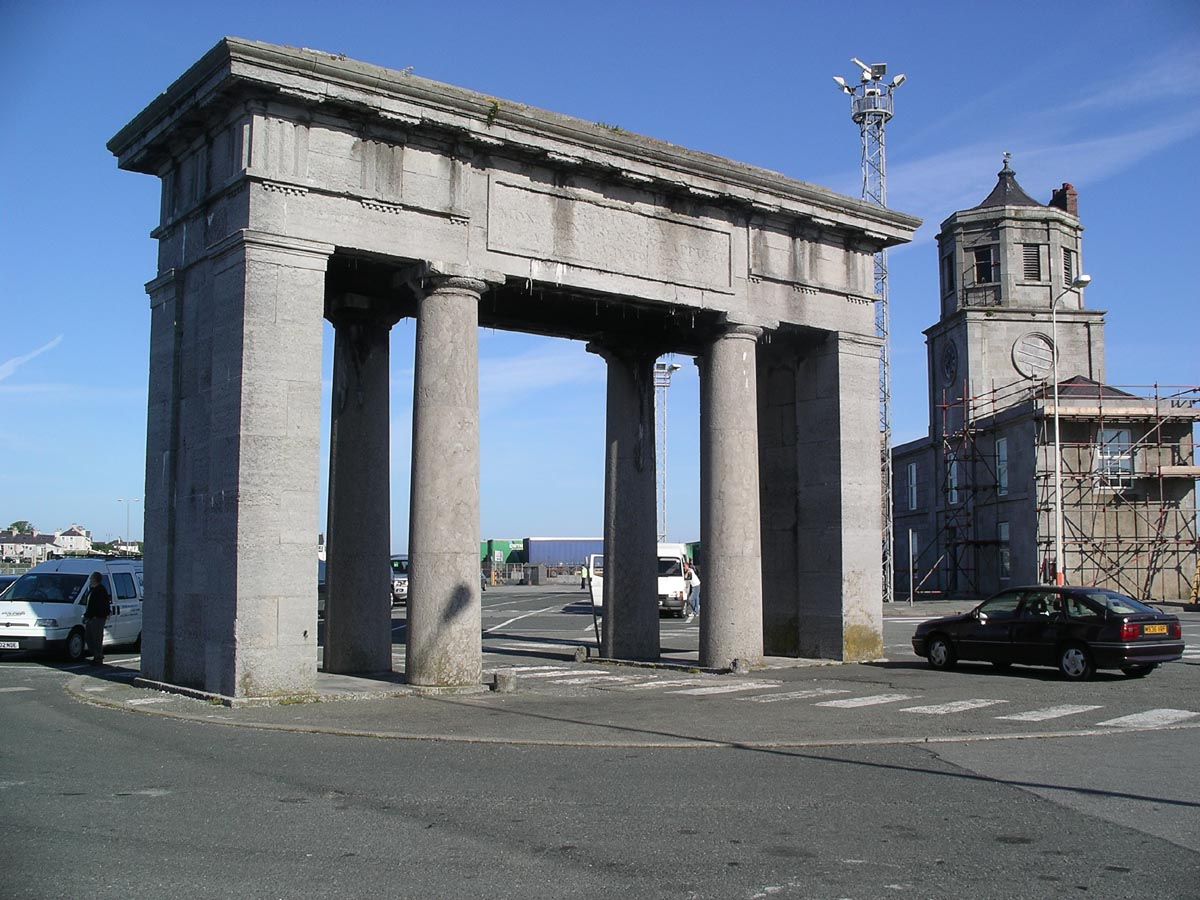
Admiralty Arch on Salt Island

Salt Island is part of the port of Holyhead and almost the whole extent of the island is used as a passenger, car and freight terminal and berths for ferries to and from Ireland. Both Irish Ferries and Stena Line sail from Salt Island to the Port of Dublin. The Holyhead lifeboat station is on the island. The Admiralty Arch, the end of the A5 which links London to Holyhead is located very close to the southern tip of the island. This was opened in 1826 when the last section of the road the Menai Suspension Bridge was completed. Access to the island as a whole is strictly monitored and is virtually impossible for pedestrians to enter.
