= Amlwch Lighthouse =

Lighthouse tower in Anglesey, Wales

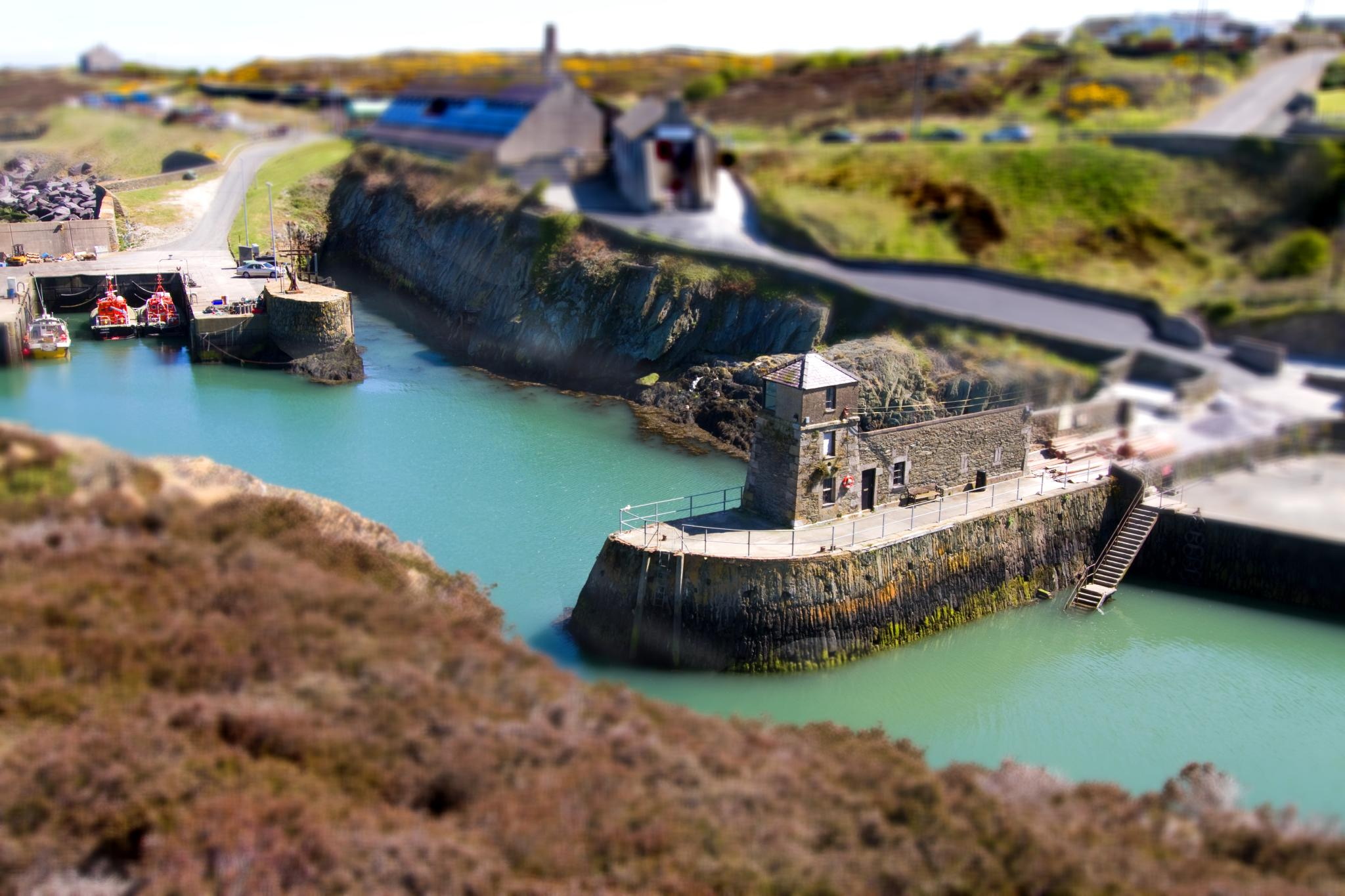
- Amlwch Old Harbour light
- Location: Amlwch, Amlwch Community, United Kingdom
- Coordinates: 53.415323°N 4.332973°W

Tower
- Constructed: 1793 (first)
- Construction: ashlar masonry
- Height: 11 metres (36 ft)
- Shape: square tower
- Markings: unpainted tower
- Operator: Isle of Anglesey Council
- Heritage: Grade II listed building, National Monument of Wales

Light
- First lit: 1817 (current)
- Deactivated: 1972
- Range: 6 nautical miles (11 km; 6.9 mi)

The Amlwch Lighthouse (Grid reference: SH 452937) is a lighthouse tower situated on the outer pier of Amlwch, at the northeast tip of Anglesey, Wales. The existing lighthouse, a square tower erected in 1853, is the fourth on this site. It has original fine, but battered, ashlar masonry to a height of 4.6 metres (15 ft); the present lantern was added on top at a later date.

== History ==
Amlwch Harbour Act 1793
- Act of Parliament
- Parliament of Great Britain
- Long title: An Act for enlarging, deepening, cleansing, improving, and regulating the Harbour of Amlwch, in the Isle of Anglesey.
- Citation: 33 Geo. 3. c. 125
- Territorial extent: Great Britain

Dates
- Royal assent: 21 June 1793
- Commencement: 21 June 1793 (Note: The Acts of Parliament (Commencement) Act 1793.)
- Repealed: 31 July 1914
Other legislation
Repealed by	Pier and Harbour Orders Confirmation (No. 3) Act 1914

Status: Repealed

Text of statute as originally enacted

Two short piers at Amlwch were built following an act of Parliament, the Amlwch Harbour Act 1793 (33 Geo. 3. c. 125), when the harbour was improved. Two octagonal houses, with small lanterns protruding from the roof, were added. They were described in the New Seaman's Guide as "small white houses displaying lights at night".

In 1816 an outer pier, about 46 metres (151 ft) long, was built to give shipping extra protection inside the harbour. In 1817, a small lighthouse with a light 8.5 metres (28 ft) above high-water mark was built, subsequently replaced with the present lighthouse.

The drydock and lighthouse on the small creek at Amlwch once served the shipping of one of the largest copper mines in Europe, located at Parys Mountain. The significance of the early copper-exporting port at Amlwch makes the lighthouse part of a heritage site of international importance.

== See also ==
- List of lighthouses in Wales
