= West Blockhouse Point Beacons =

Lighthouse in Pembrokeshire, Wales

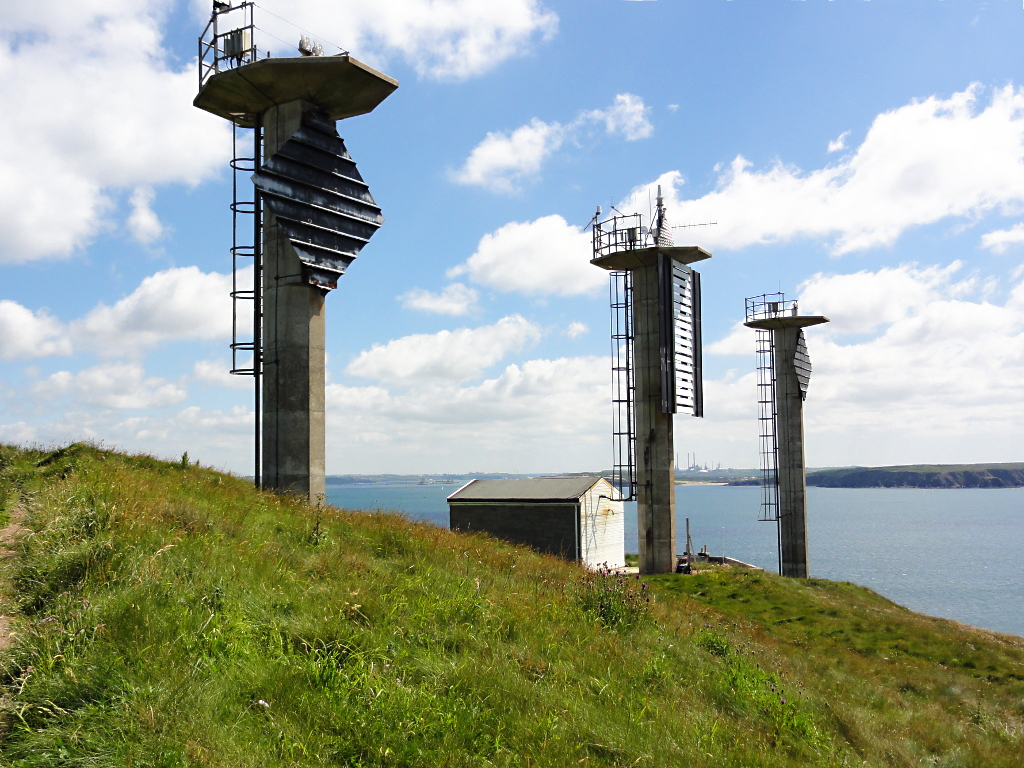
- Location: West Blockhouse Point, Pembrokeshire, United Kingdom
- Coordinates: 51°41′18″N 5°09′33″W

Tower
- Constructed: 1957
- Construction: three reinforced octagonal concrete towers with cantilevered octagonal platform
- Automated: 1957
- Height: 14 m (46 ft)
- Operator: Milford Haven Port Authority
- West light
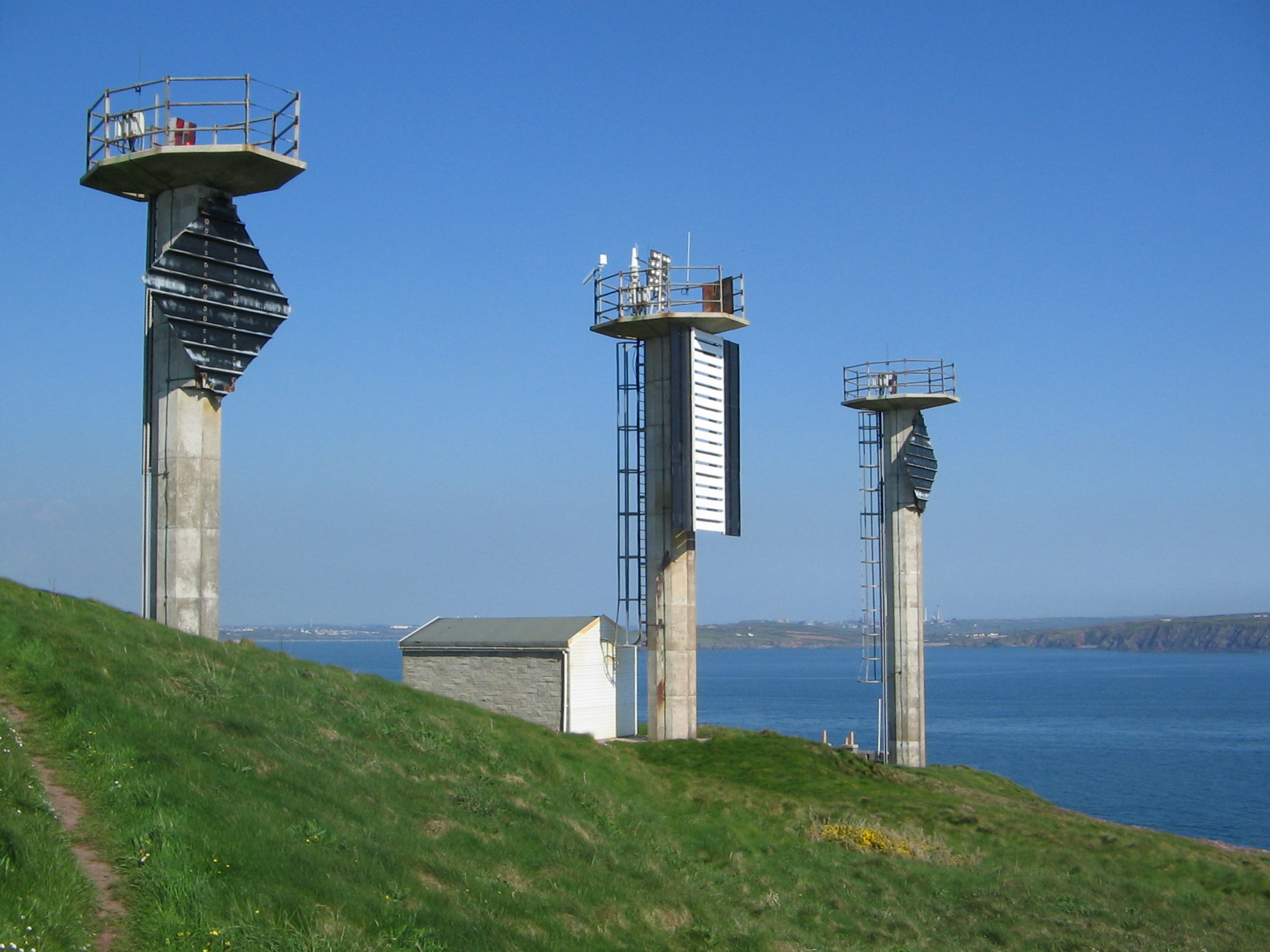
- Height: 35 ft (11 m)
- Focal height: 53 m (174 ft)
- Range: 12 nmi (22 km; 14 mi)
- Characteristic: F R
- Centre light
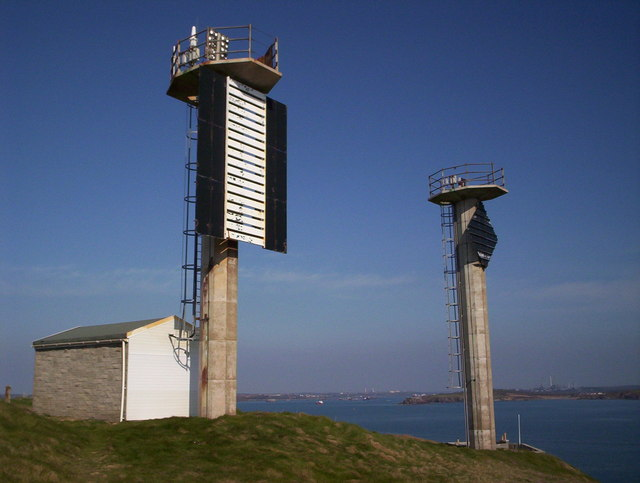
- Height: 13.5 m (44 ft)
- Focal height: 54 m (177 ft)
- Range: 13 nmi (24 km; 15 mi)
- Characteristic: F W
- East light
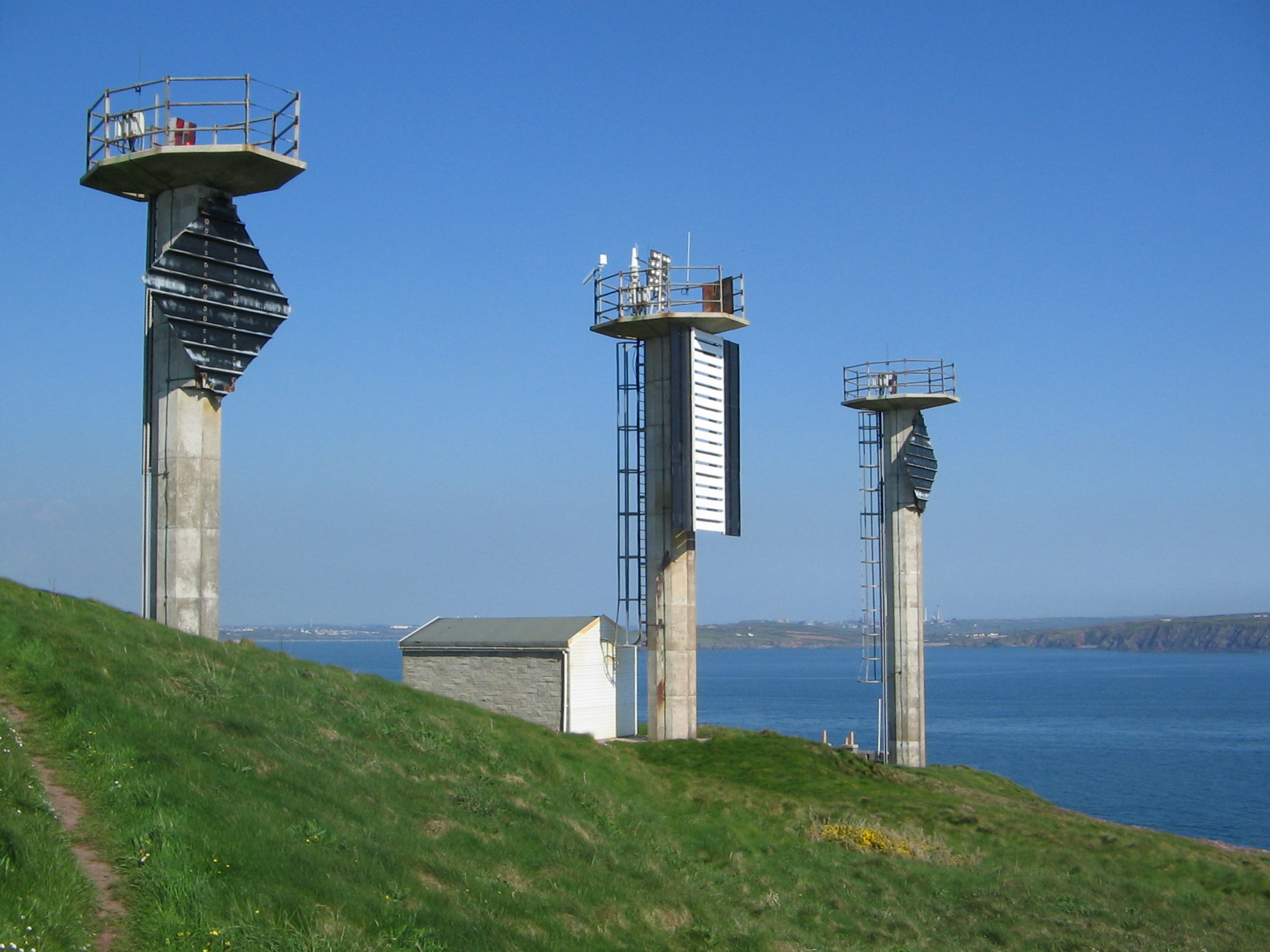
- Height: 49 ft (15 m)
- Focal height: 53 m (174 ft)
- Range: 12 nmi (22 km; 14 mi)
- Characteristic: F R

The West Blockhouse Point Beacons are three leading light beacons, they perform the same function as a lighthouse and are situated on the promontory to the west side of the entrance to Milford Haven, and lie about a mile north-east of St. Ann's Head in Pembrokeshire, Wales. They consist of three octagonal reinforced-concrete towers of 30 feet (9.1 m), 37 feet (11 m) and 46 feet (14 m) in height, with sides 1.5 feet (0.46 m) in width, surmounted by cantilevered octagonal concrete platforms on which stand sealed-beam lights. The lights are accessed by ladders which extend up the columns through an opening in the platform. Each column carries a steel daymark painted black and white.

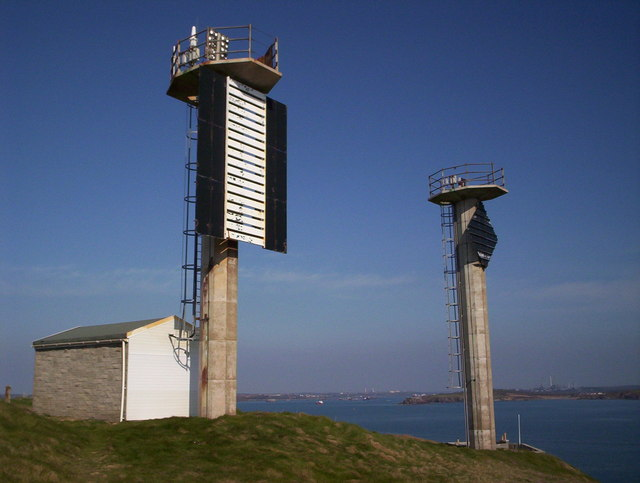
Close up view of two of the beacons

There is also a leading light beacon on the cliff below West Blockhouse Fort, set up by Trinity House engineers in 1957. This has a second-hand round metal lantern (ex Rame Head) which is 2 feet 7 inches (0.79 m) in diameter, supported on a bolted iron pedestal, standing on a concrete platform cantilevered from the cliffs and reached by a steeply descending flight of steps.

The beacons are operated by the Milford Haven Conservancy Board and are approached via Dale then the road to St Ann's Head, turning left into Maryborough Farm Road, and then taking a right turn.

== See also ==
- List of lighthouses in Wales
