= Smalls Lighthouse =

Lighthouse off Pembrokeshire, Wales

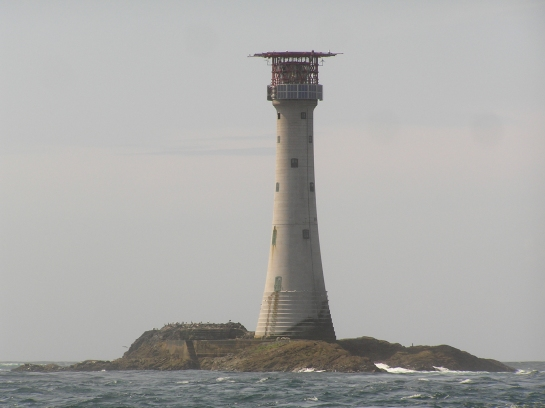
- Smalls Lighthouse in 2009
- Location: The Smalls off Marloes Peninsula; Pembrokeshire; Wales
- Coordinates: 51.721239°N 5.669831°W

Tower
- Constructed: 1776; 250 years ago (first)
- Construction: stone tower
- Automated: 1987; 39 years ago
- Height: 41 metres (135 ft)
- Shape: tapered cylindrical tower with balcony, lantern and helipad on the top
- Markings: unpainted tower
- Power source: solar power
- Operator: Trinity House
- Heritage: Grade II listed building, National Monument of Wales

Light
- First lit: 1861; 165 years ago (current)
- Focal height: 36 metres (118 ft)
- Lens: 1st Order catadioptric
- Intensity: 39,800 candela
- Range: 18 nautical miles (33 km; 21 mi)
- Characteristic: Fl (3) W 15s. (24h)

Smalls Lighthouse is a lighthouse that stands on the largest of a group of wave-washed basalt and dolerite rocks known as The Smalls approximately 20 miles (32 km) west of Marloes Peninsula in Pembrokeshire, Wales, and 8 miles (13 km) west of Grassholm. It was erected in 1861 by engineer James Douglass to replace a previous lighthouse which had been erected in 1776 on the same rock. It is the most remote lighthouse operated by Trinity House.

== Original lighthouse ==
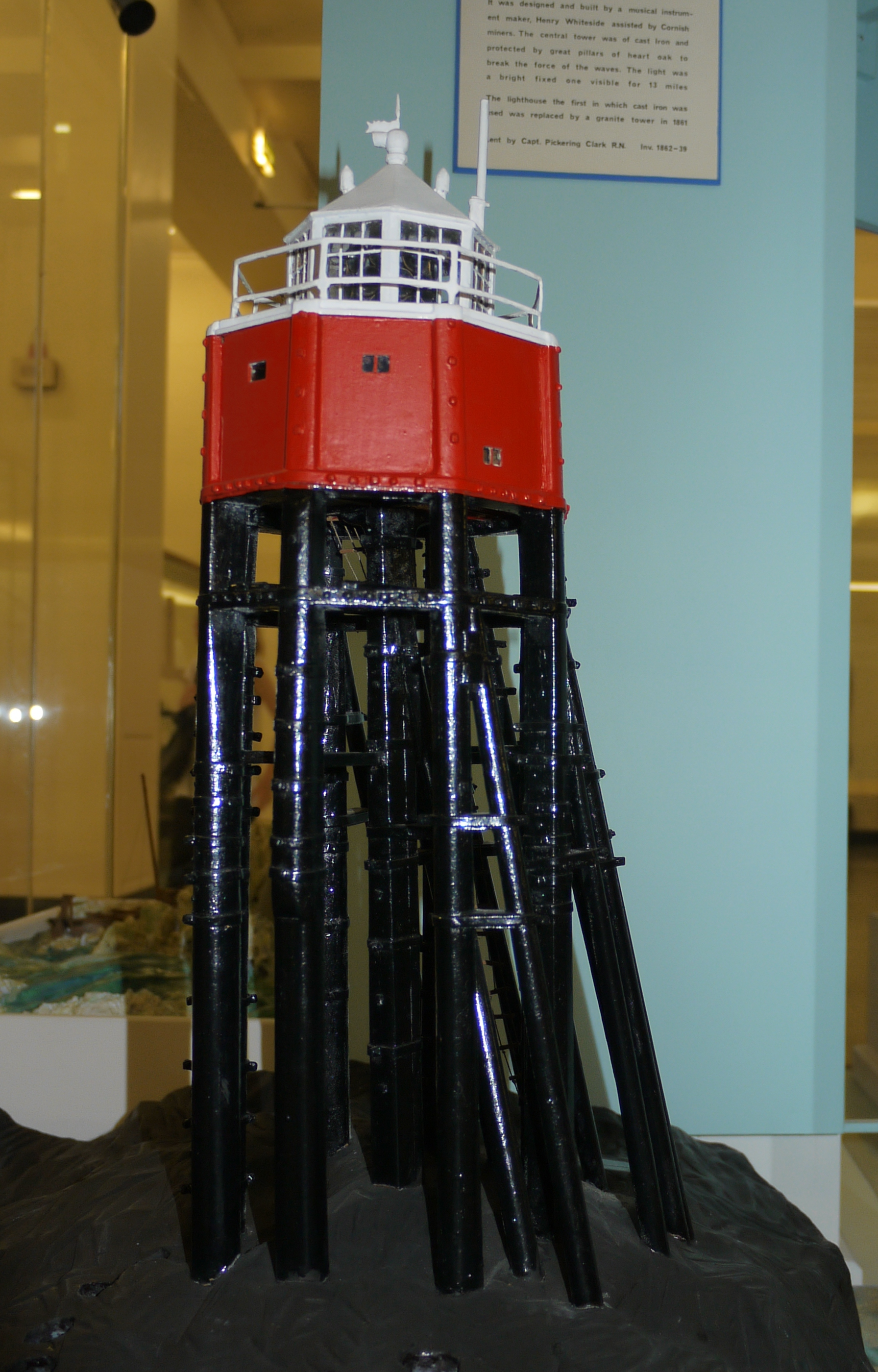
A model of the original lighthouse, on view at the Science Museum, London

=== History ===
The original Smalls Lighthouse was erected at the instigation of John Phillips (a Liverpool merchant and shipowner) between 1775 and 1776, to the plans of Liverpool musical-instrument maker Henry Whiteside. It stood on nine oak pillars, allowing the sea to pass through beneath. The original intention had been to use cast iron, but this was "soon abandoned for English oak, as being more elastic and trustworthy". Although it suffered from some rocking, it stood for 80 years.

The light was provided by eight oil lamps placed in glass-faceted reflectors. These were replaced in 1817 by double the number of lamps, together with silvered parabolic reflectors, which were far more efficient.

During its life a significant number of extra struts were added beyond the original nine. The pillar-based design has since been used successfully in many maritime structures.

When Whiteside visited the lighthouse in 1777, he was stranded for a month by gales which showed no sign of abating so that supplies were almost exhausted. He wrote a message to a friend in St. David's placed in a bottle inside a casket with a note to the finder "We doubt not but that whoever takes this up will be so merciful as to cause it to be sent to Thomas Williams, Esq, Trelithin, near St. David's, Wales". Two days later it arrived almost outside the door of the addressee to whom it was duly delivered.

==== Incidents ====
In 1801, the lighthouse experienced an incident known as the Smalls Lighthouse Tragedy. Thomas Howell and Thomas Griffith, the two-person team that managed the lighthouse, were publicly known to quarrel. When Griffith died in a freak accident, Howell feared that if he discarded the body into the sea, authorities might accuse him of murder. As Griffith's body began to decompose, Howell built a makeshift coffin for the corpse and lashed it to an outside shelf. Stiff winds blew the box apart, and the body's arm fell within view of the hut's window. As the winds would blow, gusts would catch the arm and move it in a way that made the appendage appear to beckon. In spite of his former partner's decaying corpse and working the lighthouse alone, Howell was able to keep the house's lamp lit. When Howell was finally relieved of duty, the impact of the situation was so emotionally taxing that his friends did not recognize him. As a result, the governing body changed the lighthouse policy to make lighthouse teams rosters of three people, which continued until the automation of British lighthouses in the 1980s.

In 1831, the tower was assaulted by a wave of such proportions that the floor of the keepers' room was torn up and slammed against the ceiling, injuring all the keepers, one so severely that he died. However, the damage was repaired and the lighthouse survived another thirty years before it was replaced.

== Current lighthouse ==
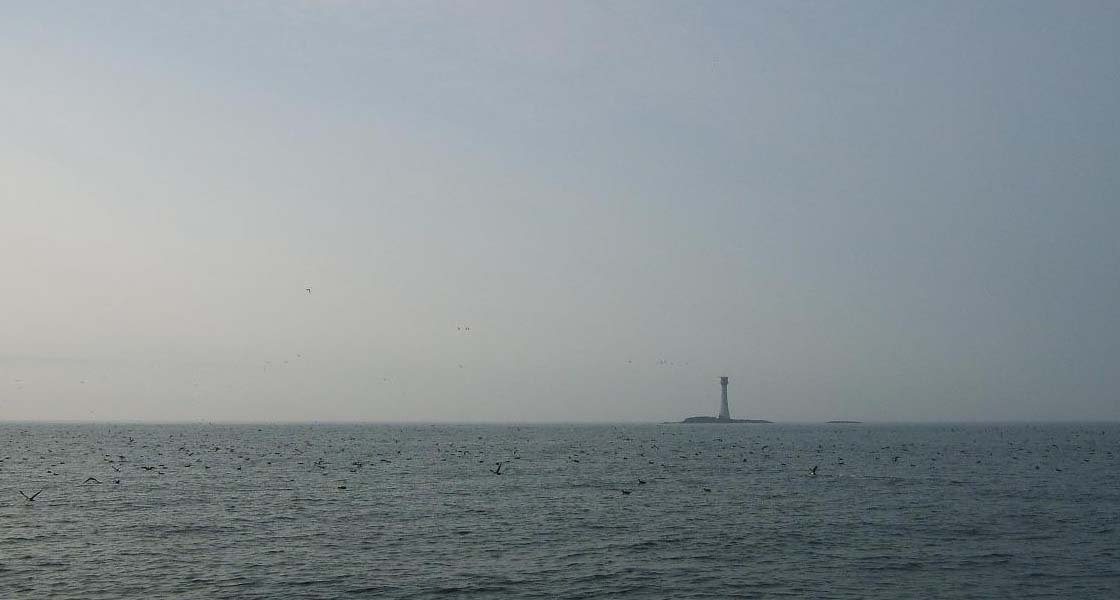
The Smalls Lighthouse from several miles away

The new lighthouse was designed by James Walker, Engineer-in-chief at Trinity House, with Douglass serving as chief engineer. The first stone of the new tower was laid on 26 June 1857, Trinity House having bought out the previous leaseholders in 1836. The tower was completed in 1861.

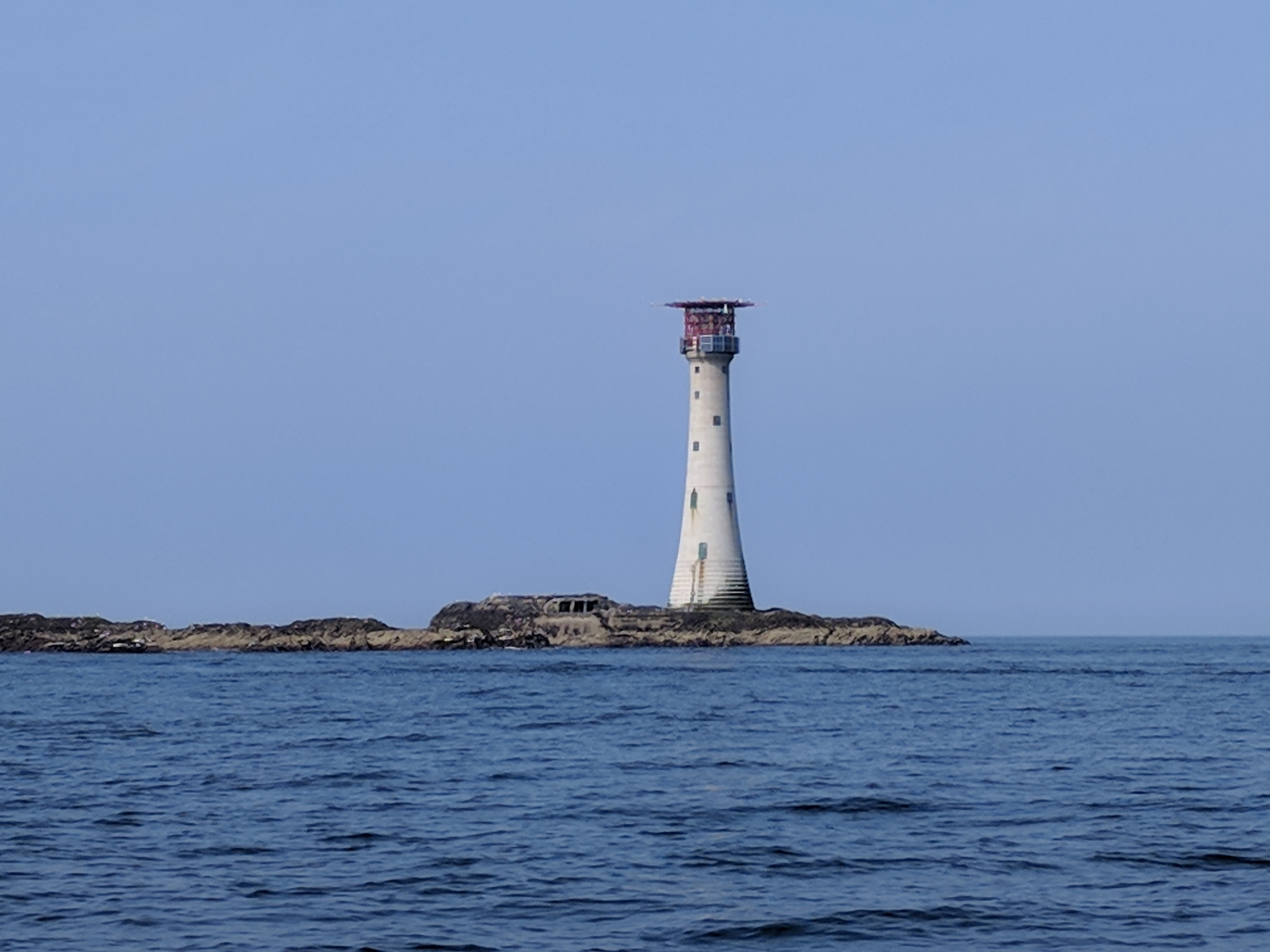
The lighthouse in 2018

In 1978 a helideck was erected above the lantern and in 1987 the lighthouse was automated. It is the first wind- and solar-powered lighthouse in the U.K. Although it has only a 35-watt bulb, with the aid of lenses, this can be seen up to 21 miles (34 km) away. It was the first lighthouse in the country to have a flushing toilet installed.

The lighthouse's story was presented in the 2006 BBC Television programme Coast, Series 1, episode "Bristol to Cardigan Bay".

== Captain T. H. Sumner ==
Smalls Lighthouse is important in the history of navigation. In 1837, the American Captain Thomas Hubbard Sumner discovered the concept of celestial position lines—the circle of equal altitude—as he was approaching Smalls Lighthouse in thick weather. These position lines form the basis of nearly all modern celestial navigation and were sometimes called Sumner Lines.

== Cultural depictions ==
In 2011 the Smalls Lighthouse Tragedy was the subject of a BBC radio play called The Lighthouse, written by Alan Harris. The 2016 British film The Lighthouse, directed by Chris Crow, is also loosely based on the incident. The 2019 film The Lighthouse by the American director Robert Eggers was also partly inspired by the tragedy.

== See also ==
- List of lighthouses in Wales
