= Flat Holm Lighthouse =

Lighthouse in Cardiff, Wales

Flat Holm Lighthouse Ynys Echni
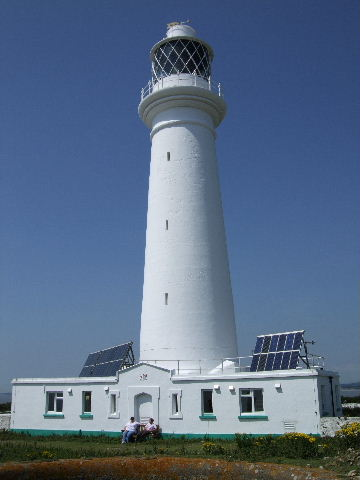
- An almost entirely solar powered lighthouse.
- Location: Flat Holm; Cardiff; Wales
- Coordinates: 51.375641°N 3.118455°W

Tower
- Constructed: 1737
- Construction: stone tower
- Automated: 1988
- Height: 30 metres (98 ft)
- Shape: tapered cylindrical tower with balcony and lantern
- Markings: white tower and lantern
- Power source: solar power
- Operator: Trinity House
- Heritage: Grade II listed building

Light
- Focal height: 50 metres (160 ft)
- Lens: 1st order (920mm) catadioptric fixed
- Intensity: 17,100 candela
- Range: 15 nautical miles (28 km; 17 mi)
- Characteristic: Fl (3) WR 10s.

Flat Holm Lighthouse is 30 m (98 ft) high and 50 m (160 ft) above mean high water. It has a 100 watt lamp that flashes three times every ten seconds, and is red from 106° to 140°; white to 151°; red to 203°; white to 106°. White light visibility up to 33 km (18 nautical miles), this data as recorded in 1965 in Reed's Nautical Almanac but Trinity House now note visibility as 28 km (15 nmi) for the white light and 22 km (12 nmi) for the red light.

== History ==
=== 18th century ===
The first light on the island was a simple brazier mounted on a wooden frame, which stood on the high eastern part of the island. In 1733 the Society of Merchant Venturers of Bristol found the brazier to be unreliable and petitioned the general lighthouse authority, Trinity House, for an actual lighthouse, but the petition failed. In 1735 Mr. William Crispe of Bristol submitted a proposal to build a lighthouse at his own expense. This initial proposal also failed but negotiations resumed in 1736 when 60 soldiers drowned after their vessel crashed on the Wolves rocks near Flat Holm. Following this disaster, the Society of Merchant Venturers finally supported William Crispe's proposal. Crispe agreed to pay £800 (£129,360, $188,865 in 2008) for the construction of the tower as well as the fees permits. The construction of the tower finished in 1737 and it began operating on 25 March 1738.

The lighthouse was struck by lightning in a severe storm on 22 December 1790. The keeper narrowly escaped but the top of the tower was severely damaged. A 3 m (10 ft) tall crack on the side had to be repaired as did the oak beams supporting the top platform.

=== 19th century ===
In 1819, the circular stone tower was updated to house a more powerful lantern; the tower was raised from 21 m (69 ft) to 27 m (89 ft). Flat Holm Lighthouse was the last signal station in the country in private ownership. In July 1822, Trinity House finally bought the lease for £15,838.10 (£1.51 million, $2.2 million in 2008). Two years later a fountain oil lamp was installed and the lantern was raised by another 1.5 m (4.9 ft). In 1867 a lantern 4 m (13 ft) in diameter was installed. A clockwork mechanism to rotate the light was installed in 1881.

=== 20th century ===
The lighthouse was renovated in 1929 to include accommodations for up to four keepers. This lasted until 1988, when the lighthouse became fully automated and the keepers were withdrawn. In 1997, the light was modernised and converted to solar power. It is now monitored and controlled by the Trinity House Operations Control Centre at Harwich, in Essex.

== Foghorn ==
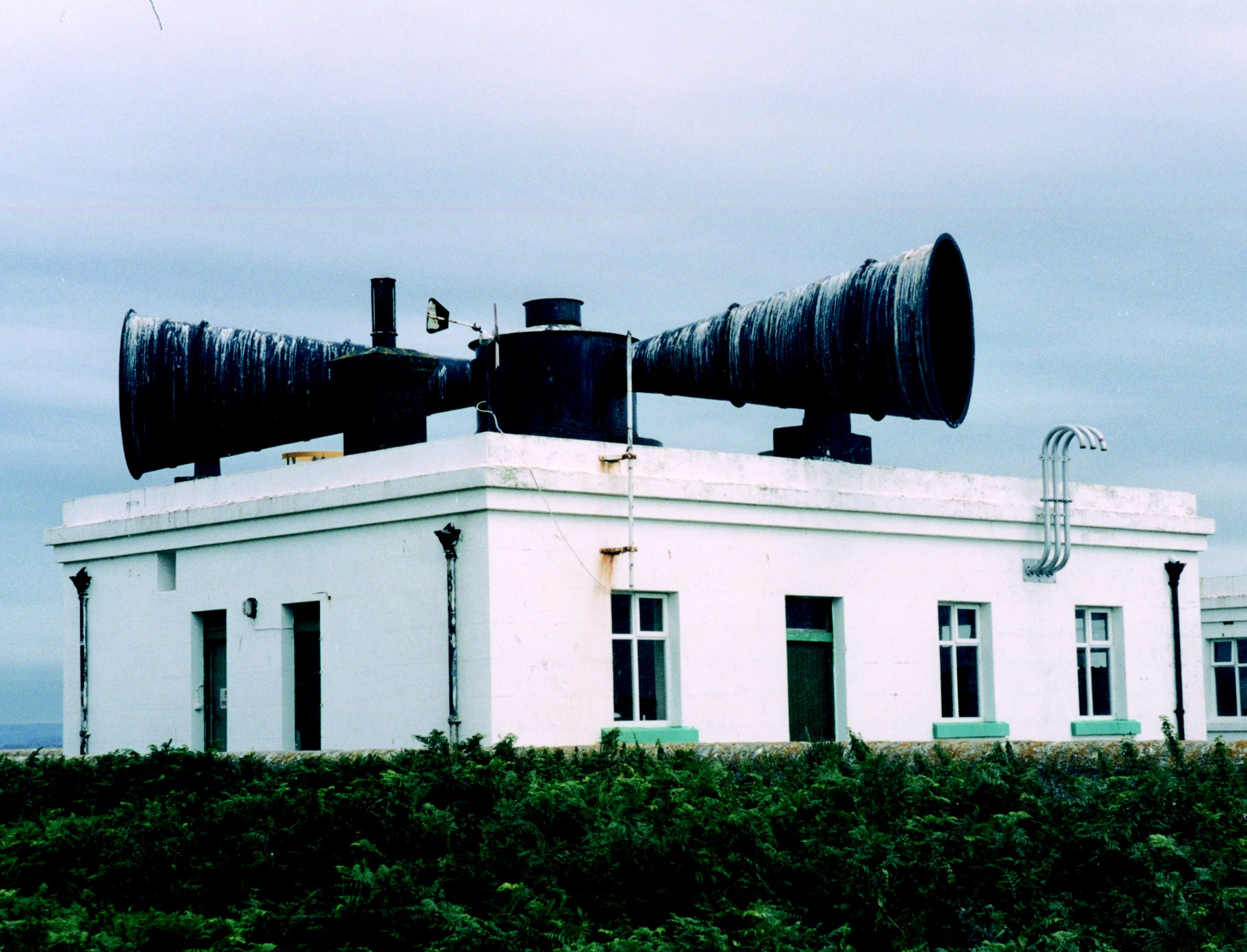
Foghorn building

Built by Trinity House in 1906, the foghorn building is a Grade II listed building. The siren was originally powered by an 11 kW (15 hp) engine, which gave two blasts in quick succession at two-minute intervals that could be clearly heard by people living on both coasts but for many years following World War II, the foghorn was heard as one long and one short blast and nautical almanac data as at 1965, stated that the interval was 1.5 minutes. Volunteers from the Flat Holm Society, with help from the Prince's Trust, restored the horn and engines in the 1960s. The Foghorn Station was officially reopened by the Welsh Secretary and the Welsh Assembly First Secretary in May 2000 when the foghorn was sounded for the first time since 1988.
