= Port of Holyhead =

Ferry port in Anglesey, Wales

Coordinates: 53.3094°N 4.6289°W

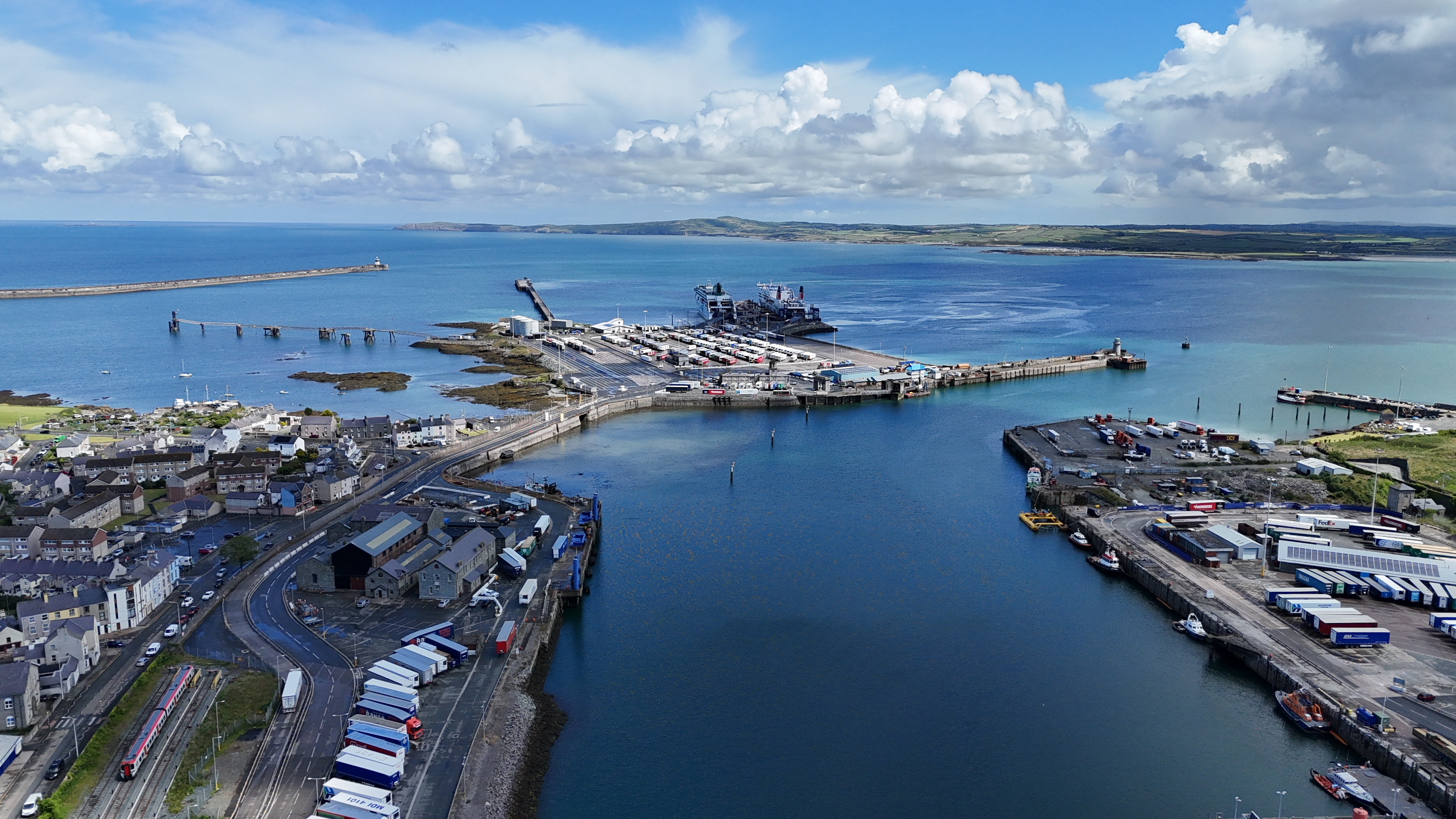
Port of Holyhead, 2024

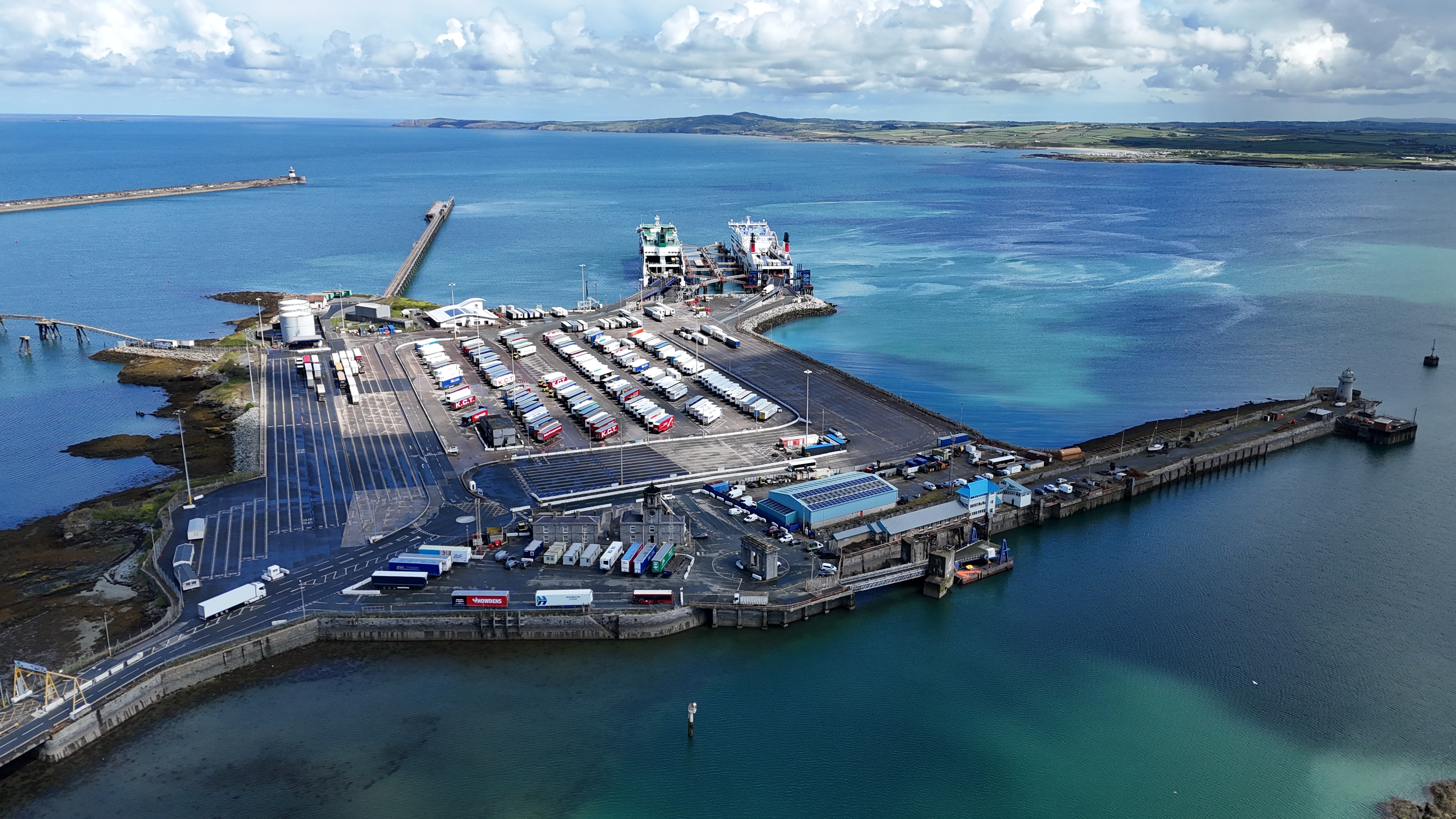
Port of Holyhead, 2024

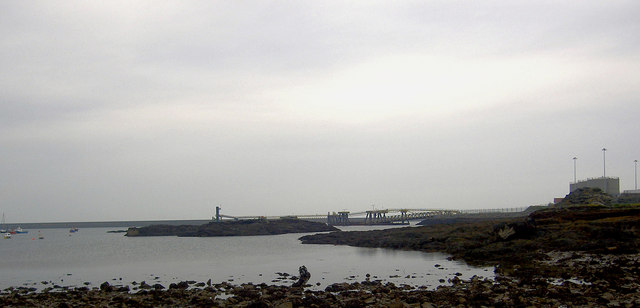
Just inside the 'New' harbour at Holyhead port.

The Port of Holyhead (Welsh: Porthladd Caergybi) is a commercial and ferry port in Anglesey, United Kingdom, handling more than 2 million passengers each year. It covers an area of 240 hectares, and is operated by Stena Line Ports Ltd. The port is the principal link for crossings from north Wales and central and northern England to Ireland. The port is partly on Holy Island and partly on Salt Island (Welsh: Ynys Halen). It is made up of the Inner Harbour, the Outer Harbour and the New Harbour (opened in 1880), all sheltered by the Holyhead Breakwater which, at 2.7 kilometres, is the longest in the UK.

== History ==
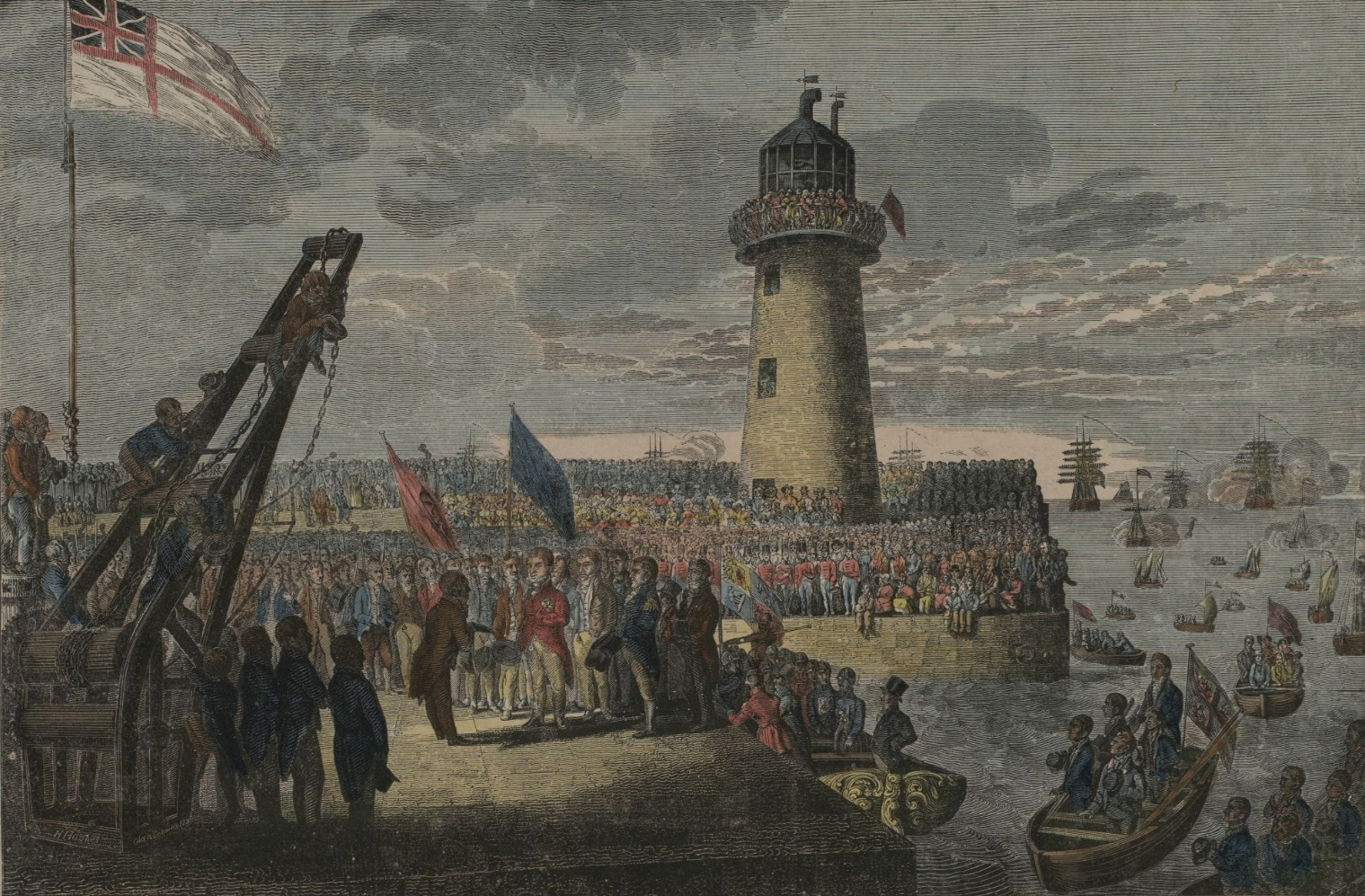
George IV at Holyhead en route to Ireland in 1821

Formerly subservient to Beaumaris as the region's main port, Holyhead came into its own in the early 19th century, when Thomas Telford built a new road to connect north Wales with London. The Admiralty Pier was constructed in 1821, and was used by the City of Dublin Steam Packet Company. The so-called "Irish Mail Line" of the Chester and Holyhead Railway ran from Holyhead railway station to the pier. The Admiralty Arch was built in 1824, marking the end of Telford's new road. The arch was designed by Thomas Harrison and its main purpose was to commemorate the visit of King George IV of the United Kingdom in 1821, when he arrived in Holyhead on the royal yacht, before leaving on a state visit to Ireland on the steam packet Lightning.

The Holyhead Harbour Act 1847 (10 & 11 Vict. c. 76) led to the construction of the new port, and a new railway station was opened in 1851. In 1853, Queen Victoria of the United Kingdom arrived in the port of Holyhead with the royal party, including her consort Prince Albert and two of her sons, including the young Prince of Wales. The breakwater was completed in 1873, and was declared open by the same Prince of Wales, now an adult, who officially opened the New Harbour on 17 June 1880. A new station hotel was erected at about the same time. However, as a starting point for sea journeys to Ireland, Holyhead soon had a rival, as the port of Fishguard began operating ferries in 1906.

In 1916, a naval base was created and the Irish Sea Hunting Flotilla was established later in the First World War to combat U-boats operating in the Irish Sea. During the 1930s, a trade war with the newly established Irish Free State had an adverse effect on the level of use of the port, which caused widespread unemployment in the town of Holyhead. During the Second World War, however, the Royal Dutch Navy began using the port as a base. In June 1939, the Royal Navy submarine HMS Thetis sank during sea trials in Liverpool Bay, and it was subsequently brought to the harbour at Holyhead after being beached at Traeth Bychan. It remained at Holyhead in dry dock while the contents were removed; fourteen of the 99 victims were buried locally. A new container port opened at Holyhead in 1970, the container service between Holyhead and Dublin having begun two years earlier. Major changes were made to the port facilities, and the station hotel was demolished in 1978. Bigger ferry vessels came into use, and the Stena Lynx 1 catamaran began services in the early 1990s.

In the late 20th century, the port was owned by Sealink (later Stena Sealink), a ferry company which ran a fast ferry from the Admiralty Pier and slower ferries from an alternative berth. The Irish ferry company B&I also operated ferries to and from Ireland from the port of Holyhead. B&I took Sealink to court in 1992 for imposing less favourable conditions on its competitor when using the port. In the following year, another company, Sea Containers Ltd, took legal action against Sealink Ports on similar grounds. Stena Line discontinued its fast ferry service in 2015, leaving Irish Ferries operating the fastest service between Holyhead and Dublin.

On 6 and 7 December 2024, during Storm Darragh, port infrastructure was damaged: two ferries collided with a berth, and the port was rendered unusable. This caused disruption to traffic between Britain and Ireland, and the port did not reopen until 16 January 2025, when one of the two berths was brought back into use. It had been due to fully reopen on 1 July 2025, but this was postponed to 19 July 2025.

== Current services ==
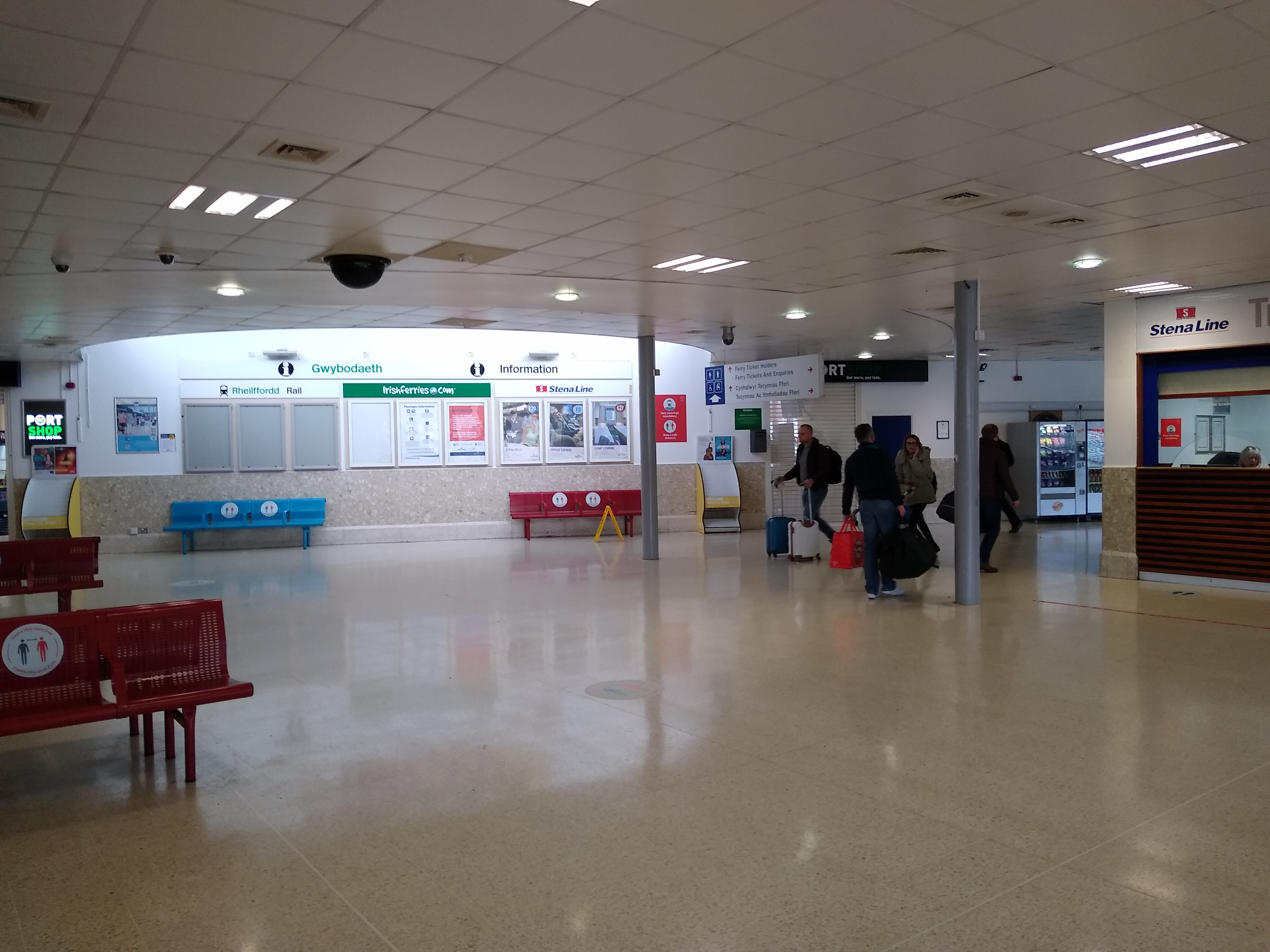
Interior of the building shared by the port and railway station

Stena Line and Irish Ferries sail from Holyhead to Dublin in Ireland. There is access to the port via a building shared with Holyhead railway station, which is served by the North Wales Coast Line to Chester and London Euston. The walk between trains and ferry check in is less than two minutes, but longer from the remote platform 1, used by Avanti West Coast services. The port is accessible to motor vehicles via both the A5 and the A55 roads. Pedestrian access from Holyhead town centre is via the Celtic Gateway, a bridge linking town and port, and takes about five minutes. The largest ferries arrive and depart from the 300-metre Admiralty Pier.
