= Nottingham Castle =

Castle in Nottingham, England

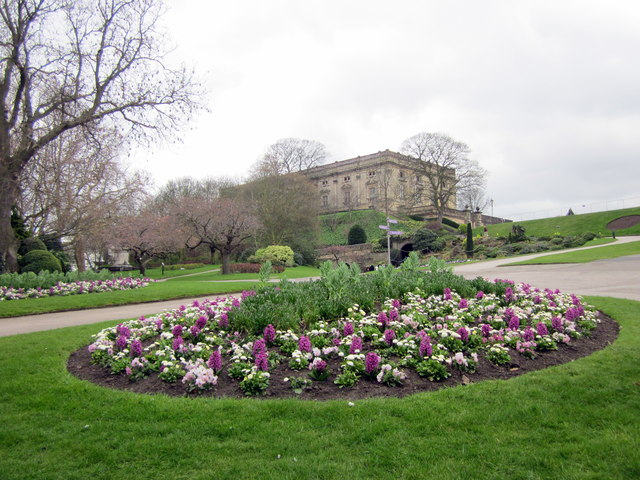
- Nottingham Castle and gardens

- The Castle Gate House shows the medieval architecture of the bridge and lower towers against the Victorian renovation of the upper towers and gate house

Site information
- Type: Enclosure castle
- Owner: Nottingham City Council

Scheduled monument
- Official name: Nottingham Castle
- Reference no.: 1006382

Listed Building – Grade I
- Official name: Nottingham Castle Museum
- Designated: 11 August 1952
- Reference no.: 1271188
- Controlled by: Nottingham Castle Trust
- Website: www.nottinghamcastle.org.uk

Location
- Location within Nottinghamshire
- Coordinates: 52.9493°N 1.1546°W

Site history
- Built: 1068
- Built by: William the Conqueror; The 1st Duke of Newcastle
- In use: Museum and art gallery
- Events: English Civil War; 1831 reform riots

Nottingham Castle is a Stuart Restoration-era ducal mansion in Nottingham, England, built on the site of a Norman castle built starting in 1068, and added to extensively through the medieval period, when it was an important royal fortress and occasional royal residence. In decline by the 16th century, the original castle, except for its walls and gates, was demolished after the English Civil War in 1651. The site occupies a commanding position on a natural promontory known as "Castle Rock" which dominates the city skyline, with cliffs 130 feet (40 m) high to the south and west.

William Cavendish, 1st Duke of Newcastle, started to build the mansion in the 1670s; it was completed by his son, the 2nd Duke of Newcastle. This ducal palace was burnt by rioters in 1831, then left as a ruin until renovated in the 1870s to house an art gallery and museum, which remain in use. Little of the original castle survives other than the gatehouse and parts of the ramparts, but sufficient portions remain to give an impression of the layout of the site.

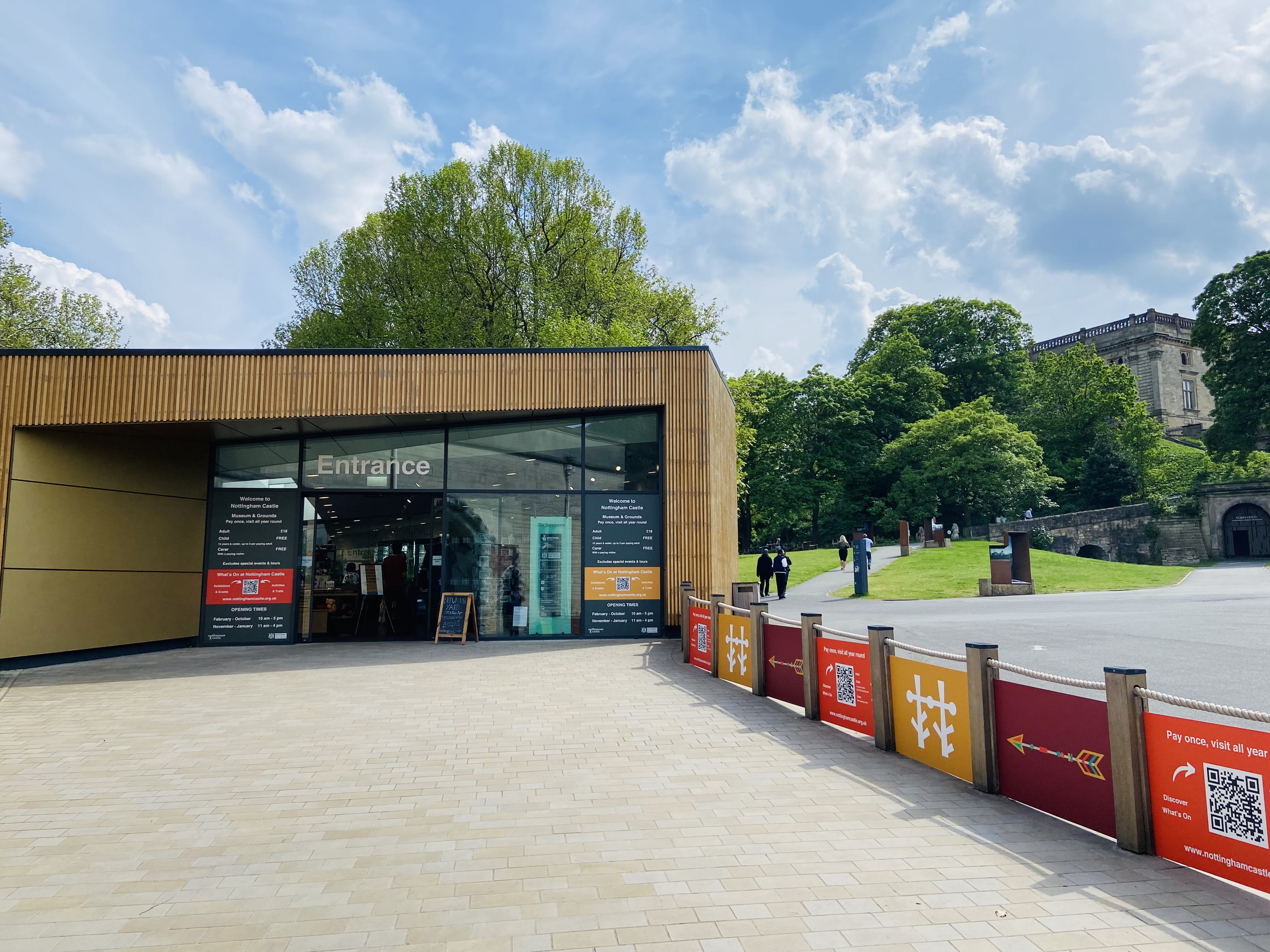
The visitor centre at the castle

The castle is owned by Nottingham City Council. After a £30 million restoration from 2018, the running of the site was undertaken by the independent charitable Nottingham Castle Trust, with a reopening on 21 June 2022. The castle closed again on 21 November 2022 when the trust went into liquidation owing the council £2.68 million, with all employees made redundant by the joint-administrators. The castle and grounds reopened to visitors on 26 June 2023.

== History ==
=== Medieval history ===
The first Norman castle on Castle Rock was a wooden structure of a motte-and-bailey design, begun in 1068, two years after the Battle of Hastings, on the orders of William the Conqueror. This wooden structure was replaced by a far more defensible stone castle during the reign of King Henry II, of an imposing and complex architectural design, which eventually comprised an upper bailey at the highest point of the castle rock, a middle bailey to the north containing the main royal apartments, and a large outer bailey to the east.

For centuries, the castle served as one of the most important in England for nobles and royalty alike. In a strategic position due to its location near a crossing of the River Trent, it was also known as a place of leisure, being close to the royal hunting grounds at Tideswell, the "Kings Larder" in the Royal Forest of the Peak, and also close to the royal forests of Barnsdale and Sherwood. The castle also had its own deer park in the area immediately to the west, still known as The Park.

While King Richard I ("the Lionheart") was away on the Third Crusade, along with a great number of English noblemen, Nottingham Castle was occupied by supporters of Prince John, including the Sheriff of Nottingham. In the legends of Robin Hood, Nottingham Castle is the scene of the final showdown between the sheriff and the heroic outlaw.

In March 1194, a historic battle took place at Nottingham Castle, part of the returned King Richard's campaign to put down the rebellion of Prince John. The castle was the site of a decisive attack when King Richard besieged it after constructing some siege machines similar to those used on crusade. Richard was aided by Ranulph de Blondeville, 4th Earl of Chester and David of Scotland, 8th Earl of Huntingdon. The castle surrendered after just a few days.

Shortly before his 18th birthday, King Edward III, with the help of a few trusted companions led by Sir William Montagu, staged a coup d'état at Nottingham Castle (19 October 1330) against his mother Isabella of France, and her lover, Roger Mortimer, 1st Earl of March. Both Isabella and Mortimer were acting as Regents during Edward's minority following their murder of his father Edward II at Berkeley Castle. William Montagu and his companions were accompanied by William Eland, castellan and overseer of Mortimer's castle, who knew the location of a secret tunnel which would take them higher up in the castle to a normally locked door. In the dark of night on 19 October 1330, Montagu and his companions entered the tunnel, climbed up to the door, which had now been unlocked either by Edward III or a trusted servant, and overpowered Mortimer, killing Mortimer's personal guards. Mortimer was bound and gagged, led out of the tunnel and arrested, along with Queen Mother Isabella. Mortimer was sent to the Tower of London and hanged a month later. Isabella of France was forced into retirement at Castle Rising Castle. With this dramatic event, the personal reign of Edward began. These events seem to be echoed in an interpolation made to a metrical chronicle in around 1331, which describes the caves beneath the castle as having been carved out by Lancelot in his attempts to hide Guinevere from King Arthur following their adulterous affair. This seems to be the earliest reference to Lancelot and Guinevere's adultery that exists.

=== Royal residence ===
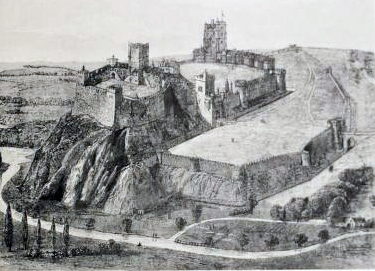
Victorian suggestion of the possible appearance of Nottingham Castle in the late medieval period

Edward III used the castle as a residence and held parliaments. In 1346, King David II of Scotland was held prisoner. In 1365, Edward III improved the castle with a new tower on the west side of the Middle Bailey and a new prison under the High Tower. In 1376 Peter de la Mare, speaker of the House of Commons, was confined in Nottingham Castle for having "taken unwarrantable liberties with the name of Alice Perrers, mistress of the king".

In 1387, during Richard II's gyration, the state council was held in the castle. Richard II held the Lord Mayor of London, aldermen, and sheriffs in the castle in 1392, and held another state council for the purpose of humbling Londoners. The last visit recorded by Richard II was in 1397 when another council was held here.

From 1403 until 1437, it was the main residence of Henry IV's queen, Joan of Navarre. After the residence of Joan, maintenance was reduced. Only upon the Wars of the Roses did Nottingham Castle begin to be used again as a military stronghold. Edward IV proclaimed himself king in Nottingham, and in 1476, he ordered the construction of a new tower and Royal Apartments. This was described by John Leland in 1540 as:

the most beautifulest part and gallant building for lodging... a right sumptuous piece of stone work.

During the reign of Henry VII, the castle remained a royal fortress. Henry VIII ordered new tapestries from Cornelius van der Strete for the castle before he visited Nottingham in August 1511. In 1538 the Constable, Thomas Manners, 1st Earl of Rutland, reported on the need for maintenance. A survey in 1525 stated that there was much "dekay and ruyne of said castell" and

part of the roof of the Great Hall is fallen down both timber and lead. Also the new building there is in dekay of timber, lead and glass.

In 1536, the Earl of Rutland had the castle reinforced with a new drawbridge and its garrison increased from a few dozen men to a few hundred in response to the Pilgrimage of Grace. The castle was proposed as a venue for a meeting between Elizabeth I and Mary, Queen of Scots, in June 1562, with masques staged in the Great Hall, but the event was cancelled.

=== Civil war ===
Charles I Raising His Standard by Henry Dawson, 1847

The castle ceased to be a royal residence by 1600 and was largely rendered obsolete in the 17th century by artillery. A short time following the outbreak of the English Civil War, the castle was already in a semi-ruined state after a number of skirmishes occurred on the site. At the start of the Civil War, in August 1642, Charles I chose Nottingham as the rallying point for his armies, but soon after he departed, the castle rock was made defensible and held by the Parliamentarians. Commanded by John Hutchinson, they repulsed several Royalist attacks, and they were the last group to hold the castle. In 1648, the Royalist commander Marmaduke Langdale, fleeing after defeat in the Battle of Preston, was captured and held in Nottingham Castle, but he managed to escape and make his way to Europe. In 1651, two years after the execution of Charles I in 1649, the castle was razed to prevent it from being used again.

=== Construction of the Ducal Mansion ===
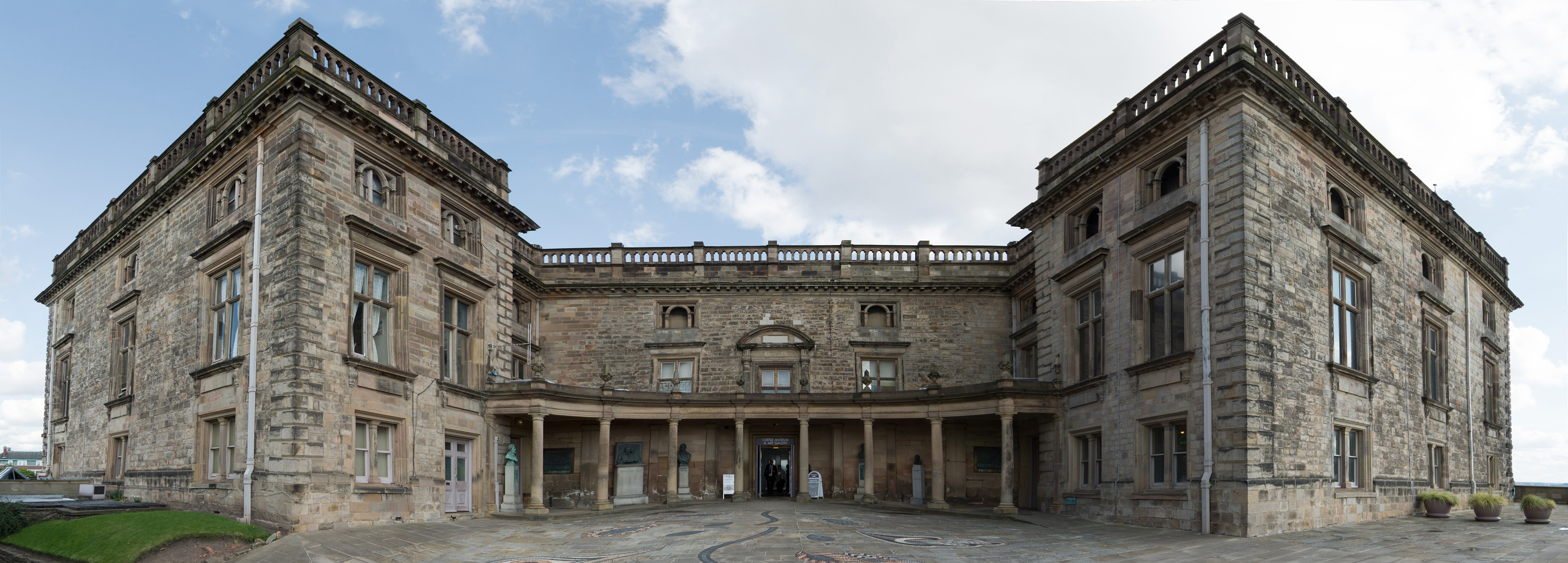
Entrance to the Ducal Mansion (2012)

After the restoration of Charles II in 1660, the present 'Ducal Mansion' was built for the 1st Duke of Newcastle and completed by his son, the 2nd Duke of Newcastle, after the 1st Duke's death. This "Italianate" palace was seen as one of the finest in England at the time. Despite the destruction of the keep and fortifications of the upper bailey, some rock cut cellars and medieval pointed arches survive beneath the mansion, together with a long passage to the bottom of the rock, commonly known as Mortimer's Hole, through which guided tours take place, starting at the castle and ending at Brewhouse Yard.

The mason for the mansion was Samuel Marsh of Lincoln, who also worked for the duke at Bolsover Castle. His designs are generally thought to have been strongly influenced by Rubens's engravings, in his book Palazzi di Genova. The duke's mansion is a relatively rare surviving example in England of the style of Artisan Mannerism.

However, the mansion lost its appeal to the later dukes with the coming of the Industrial Revolution, which left Nottingham with the reputation of having the worst slums in the British Empire outside India. When residents of these slums rioted in 1831, in protest against the 4th Duke of Newcastle's opposition to the Reform Bill, they burned down the mansion. The original exterior stairs on the eastern façade of the mansion were subsequently demolished to create a parade ground for the Robin Hood Rifles.

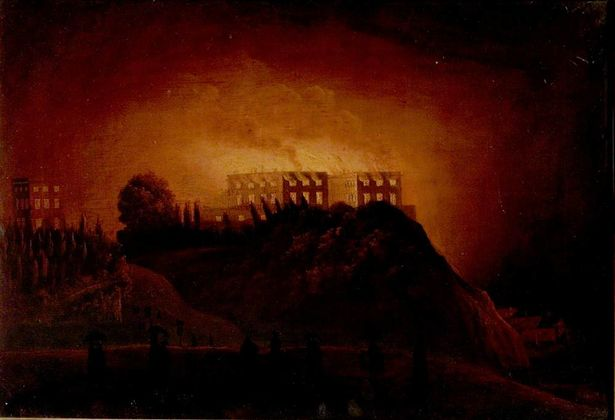
A depiction of the castle on fire in 1831

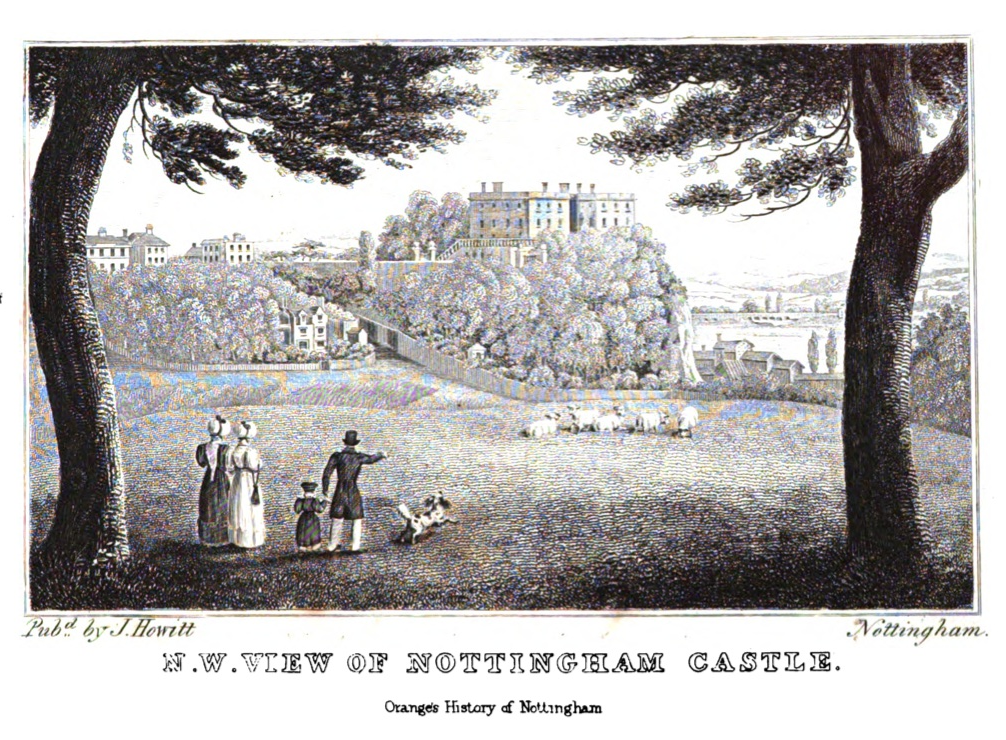
The castle from The History and Antiquities of Nottingham by James Orange, 1840

=== Reconstruction as the Nottingham Castle Museum ===
The mansion remained a derelict shell until it was restored in 1875 by Thomas Chambers Hine, and opened in 1878 by the Prince of Wales, (later King Edward VII) as Nottingham Castle Museum, the first municipal art gallery in the UK outside London. The new interiors ignored the original floor levels and fenestration to accommodate a top-lit picture gallery modelled after the Grand Gallery of the Louvre.

The gatehouse of the medieval castle and much of the walling of the outer bailey were retained as a garden wall for the Ducal Mansion. However, the northernmost part of the outer bailey was lost when an approach road was constructed in the 1830s for the development of The Park Estate on the former deer park.

In September 1939, the British Army took possession of the Castle and its grounds, and in 1941, control transferred to the Air Ministry. Large quantities of stores were kept there for the duration of the Second World War. It was handed back to the city in 1946.

On Christmas Day 1996, a landslip, caused by a leaking water main, led to 80 tonnes of earth and retaining wall from the Restoration terrace next to the mansion falling to the bottom of the Castle Rock. This revealed some remains of the original castle foundations and the bedrock. After a lengthy controversy on the best conservation/restoration approach, the terrace was reinstated with a traditional stone façade. The terrace offers great views to the south of the city, and appeared in Saturday Night and Sunday Morning, a film about the attitudes of youth in a changing industrial society.

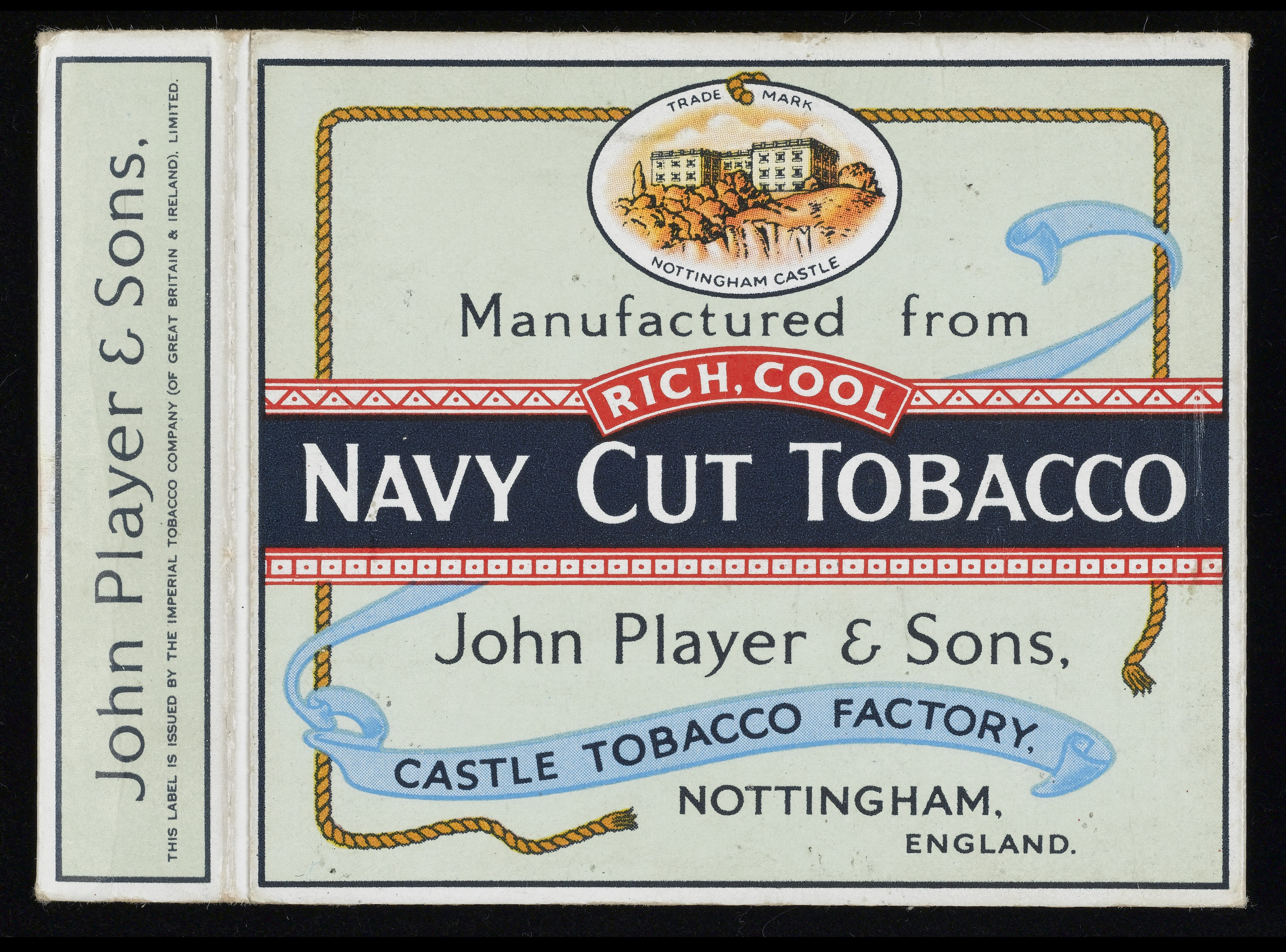
Player's Navy Cut Cigarettes

A drawing of the Ducal Mansion appeared on millions of packets of rolling tobacco and cigarettes made by John Player & Sons, a Nottingham firm. Most packets had the phrases Nottingham Castle and Trade Mark bracketing the image of the non-fortress-like structure. This led the novelist Ian Fleming to refer to "that extraordinary trademark of a dolls house swimming in chocolate fudge with Nottingham Castle written underneath" in Thunderball, in the knowledge that his British readers would be familiar with the image.

=== Renovation between 2018 and 2021 ===
Nottingham Castle and its grounds were closed to the public in 2018 to undergo large-scale redevelopment. The closure was much longer than anticipated due to the COVID-19 pandemic and cost £30 million. A new visitor centre was created together with exhibition galleries, interactive displays, a children's adventure area in the old castle moat themed on Robin Hood's era and a showcase of local industries including Nottingham Lace.

On 1 June 2021, Nottingham City Council handed over responsibility for running the castle to the independent, charitable Nottingham Castle Trust. The castle reopened on 21 June 2021.

=== Criticism and insolvency ===
Soon after reopening, in late August 2021, the Castle Trust received negative reviews on Tripadvisor with criticism of the £13 adult entrance charge being too high; entry to the grounds had previously been without charge or at "a nominal payment" for Nottingham City residents. The charge was criticised by a local ghost tour operator as likely to be counter-productive to the new café's revenue, with local visitors effectively barred from the grounds by the admission price. The trust was also criticised for the way it handled an alleged racist incident in the grounds, and staff published an open letter alleging a "toxic culture" and being "gaslit" around concerns about racism and misogyny. Two trustees stepped down in September 2022 after pressure from external groups over their handling of the racist incident and other governance issues at the castle.

On 21 November 2022, the Castle Trust announced that it was in the process of appointing liquidators and that the castle grounds and exhibitions would be closed to visitors until further notice. The site was returned to the council, which announced that they would reopen it as soon as possible. The trust said that the failure was due to the COVID pandemic in the UK from 2020, the later financial crisis, and the tripling of energy costs going into the quietest trading period of the year.

In addition to the restoration costs of £30 million covered by major grants, in late November 2022 it was revealed that the Castle Trust itself had debts to the council of £2.68 million in operating cost loans. Additionally, a non-charitable limited company providing services within the grounds was part of the insolvency, and all of the staff were made redundant by 30 November 2022. Nottingham City Council's executive board announced on 21 March 2023 that Nottingham Castle would reopen in late June 2023, with events taking place before the full reopening. The castle and grounds, including the Brewhouse Yard, re-opened to visitors on 26 June 2023. It is to be run as part of the city council's museum operations.

== Nottingham Castle Museum ==
Until its closure for refurbishment in July 2018, the ducal mansion was in use as a museum and art gallery. Since reopening it continues to house most of the City of Nottingham's fine and decorative art collections, galleries on the history and archaeology of Nottingham and the surrounding areas, and the regimental museum of the Sherwood Foresters. Notable elements of the collections were:

- 15th-century Nottingham alabaster carvings, including those found in 1779 during the demolition of St Peter's Church, Flawford
- Watercolours by Richard Parkes Bonnington and Paul Sandby
- The Joseph Collection of Wedgwood Jasperware
- The Ballantyne Collection of contemporary ceramics
- Salt-glazed stoneware, including locally made "bear jugs"
- A costume collection including Nottingham lace-making
- Roman votive offerings from the Temple of Diana Nemorensis at Lake Nemi
- Works by George Wallis

Additionally, The Nottingham Castle Victoria Cross Memorial, dedicated on 7 May 2010, lists Albert Ball and 19 other Nottinghamshire recipients of the Victoria Cross.

Fine art from Britain and continental Europe is displayed in the Long Gallery of the Castle. It included works by artists from Nottinghamshire such as Thomas Barber, Richard Bonington, Henry Dawson, Paul Sandby and John Rawson Walker, and 20th-century works by Edward Burra, Tristram Hillier, Ivon Hitchens, Dame Laura Knight, Harold Knight, L.S. Lowry, William, Ben and Winifred Nicholson, Stanley Spencer, Matthew Smith and Edward Wadsworth.

=== Gallery ===
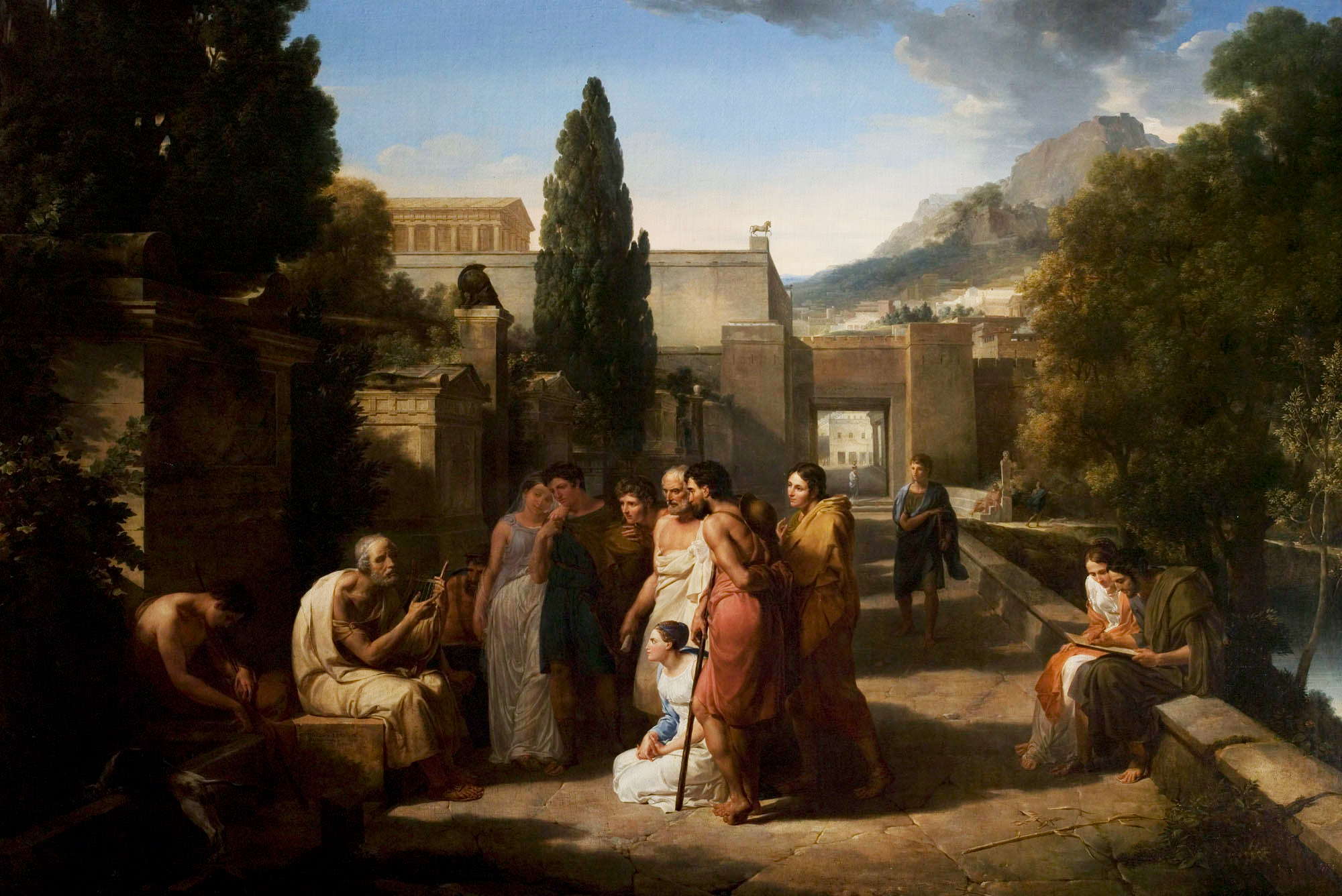
Homer Singing His Iliad at the Gates of Athens by Guillaume Guillon-Lethière, 1811

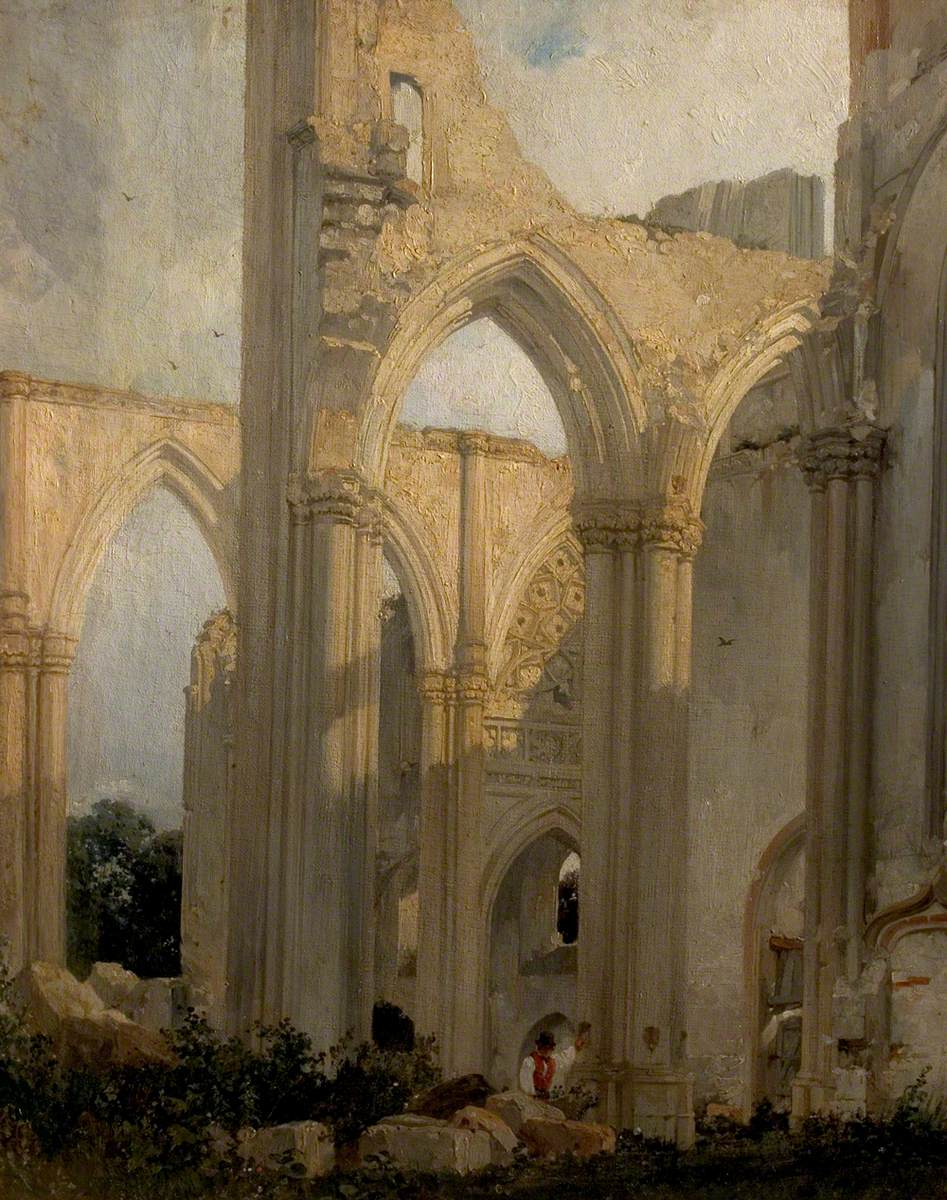
Ruins of the Abbey Saint Bertin by Richard Parkes Bonington, 1824

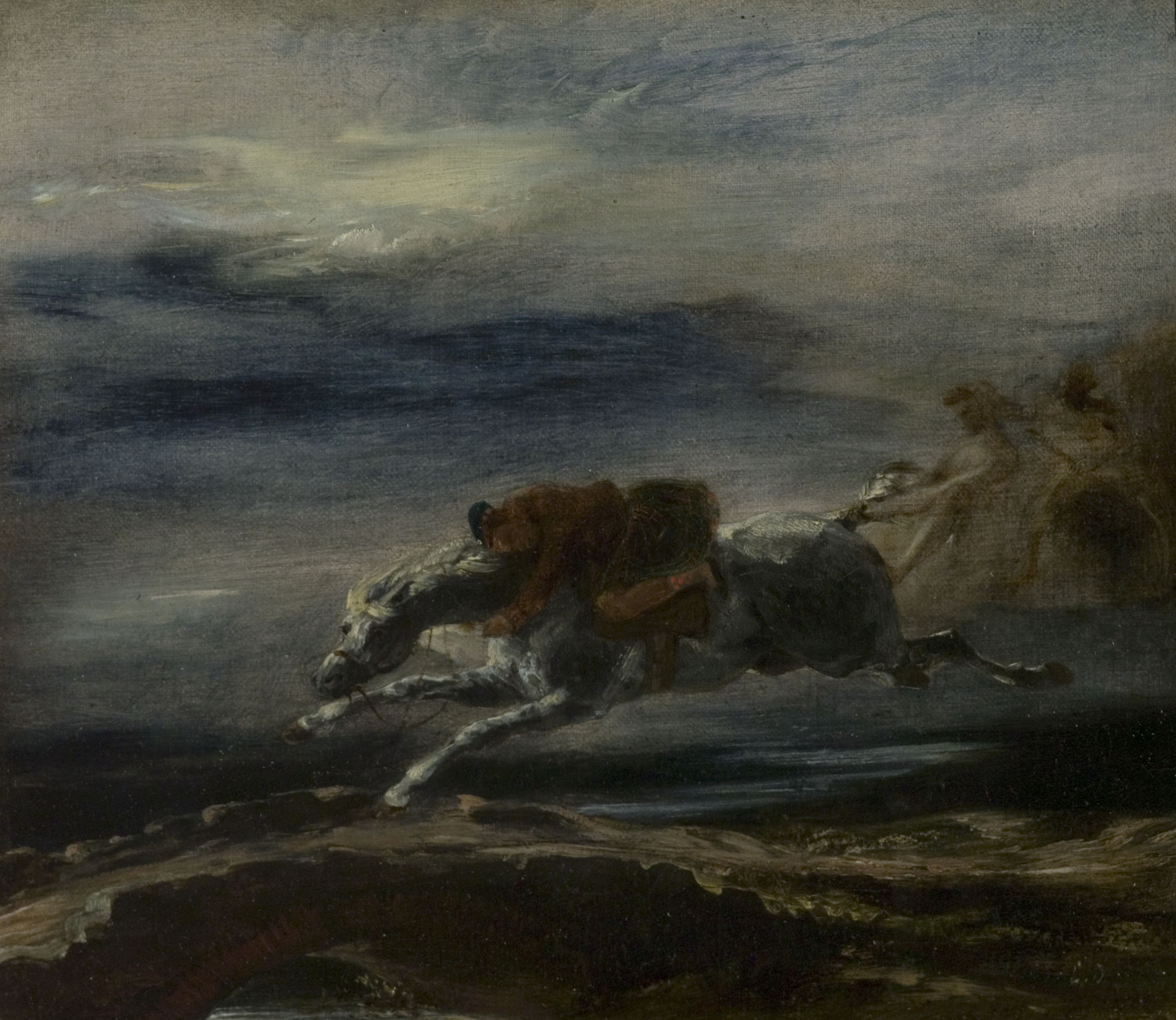
Tam O'Shanter by Eugène Delacroix, 1825

The Château of the Duchess of Berry by Richard Parkes Bonington, 1825

Quentin Durward at Liège by Richard Parkes Bonington, 1828

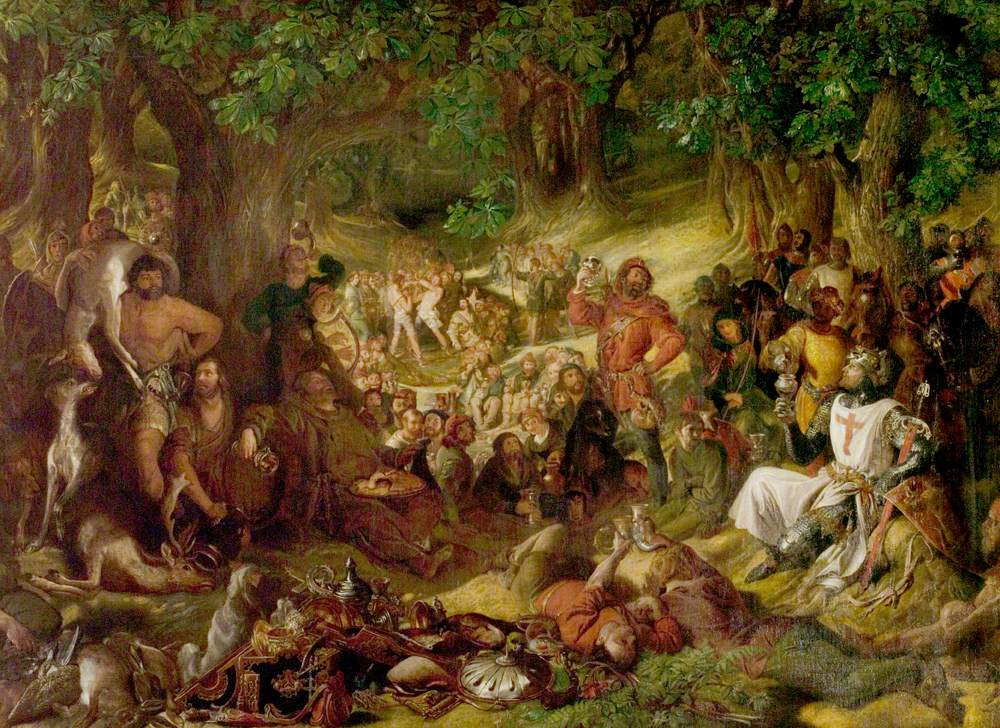
Robin Hood and His Merry Men Entertaining Richard the Lionheart in Sherwood Forest by Daniel Maclise, 1839

Charles I Raising His Standard by Henry Dawson, 1847

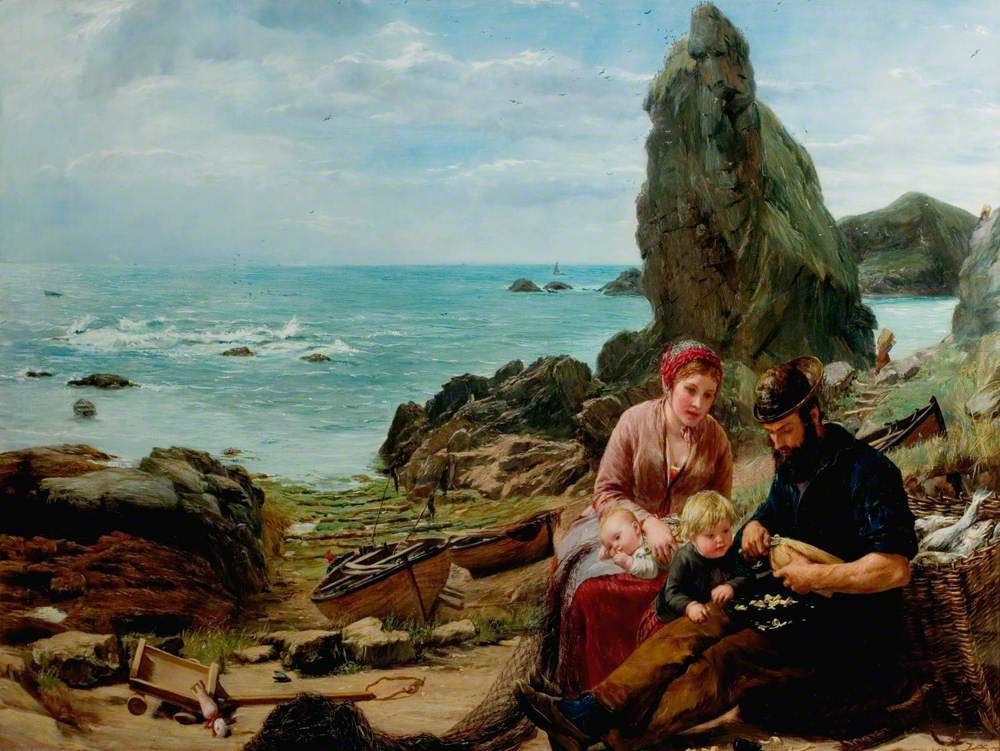
Hearts of Oak by James Clarke Hook, 1875

== See also ==
- History of Nottingham
- Grade I listed buildings in Nottinghamshire
- Listed buildings in Nottingham (Radford and Park ward)
