= Frederick William Hayes =

English landscape painter, playwright and novelist

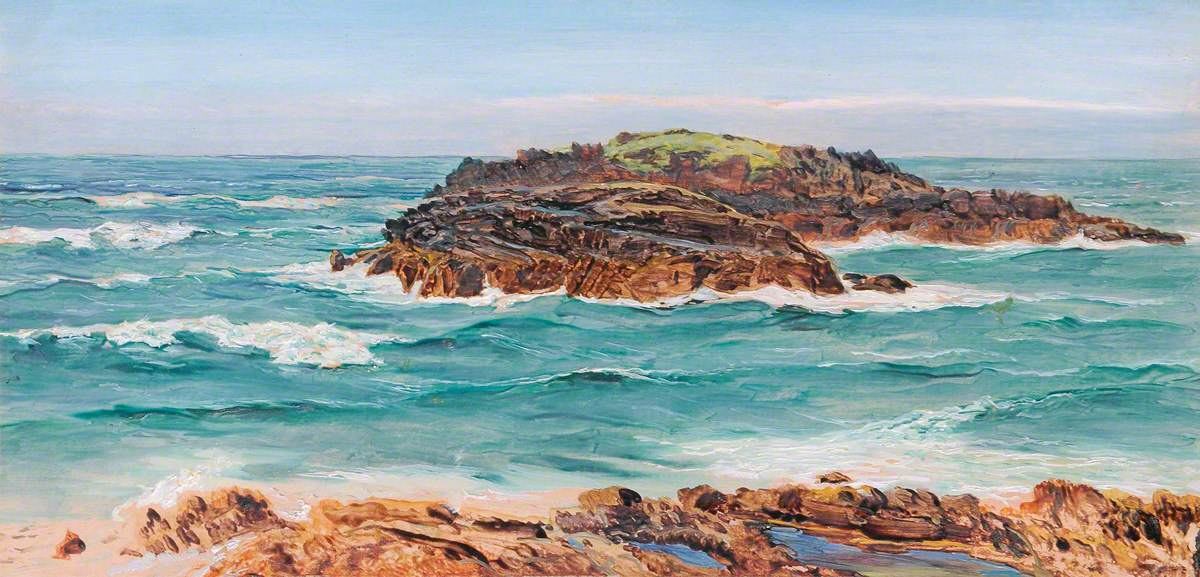
Llanddwyn III, oil on card, Bangor University

Frederick William Hayes ( 13 July 1848, Freshfield, Merseyside - 7 September 1918, Hampstead, London) was an English landscape painter, illustrator, playwright, and novelist.

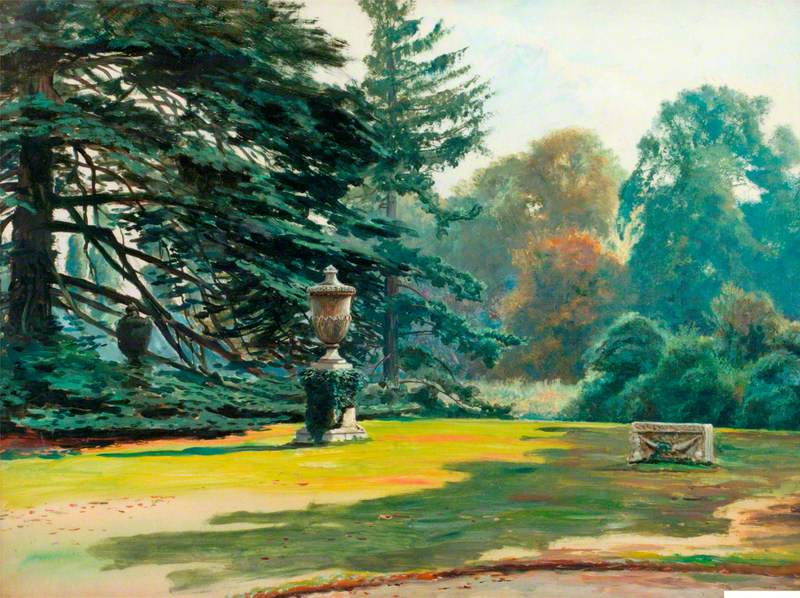
Study of Cedars at Chiswick House, oils, Victoria and Albert Museum

By 1922, when he had a memorial exhibition (in effect) at Walker's Galleries in London, his paintings were part of the collections of the British Museum and the Victoria and Albert Museum among other institutions, after a round of donations by his widow. Bangor University has a large number, nearly all of North Welsh views, donated by the Hayes family in 1943. These works mostly show details of a landscape such as rocks, a tree or a boat on a beach, without figures or animals. The tidal island of Ynys Llanddwyn, off Anglesey, is a particular favourite. As well as the fresh and direct style of these works, he produced illustrations for reproduction as prints or publications in more popular styles, not being afraid of sentimentality in subjects such as stags in misty glades.

His novel The Great Revolution of 1905; or, The Story of the Phalanx, With an Introductory Account of Civilization in Great Britain at the Close of the Nineteenth Century (1893) is considered an example of the type of literary utopianism that was flourishing during the late 19th century.

== Career ==
He was educated in architecture at Liverpool College, then studied painting in Liverpool, before moving to London as a pupil of the landscape painter Henry Dawson for some 18 months from early 1871. Dawson's son Alfred describes him (in 1891) as Dawson's "only regular pupil, as understood in the old sense", and Hayes as "an artist of ability, now living near Chiswick and painting the rocky shores regarded with such favour by so many". Dawson's training was mainly having Hayes repeat, at slightly smaller size, his own works in progress as they developed, giving "more or less copies". They visited the Lake District together, with Alfred Dawson accompanying them, in September 1871.

Returning to Liverpool for a period, he founded the Liverpool Watercolour Society, had his work shown in more than ten exhibitions at the Royal Academy of Arts between 1872 and 1891, and produced more than 3,000 illustrations during his career. Martin Hardie notes his "many experiments in painting landscapes direct from nature with transparent oil colours copiously mixed with turpentine". The British Museum calls this technique "thin oil colour". He was not related to his contemporary Claude Hayes, also a landscape watercolourist.

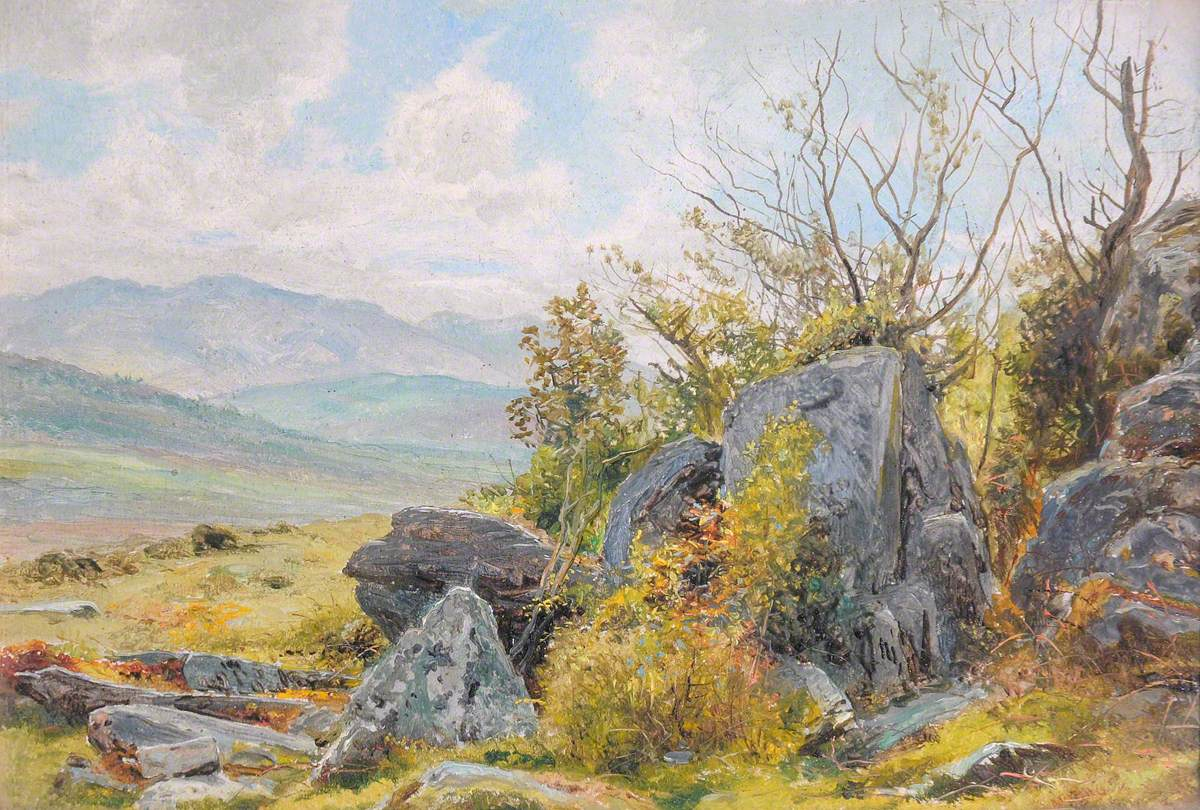
Yr Eifl, oil on paper, Bangor University

He married twice and had children.

== Partial list of literary works ==
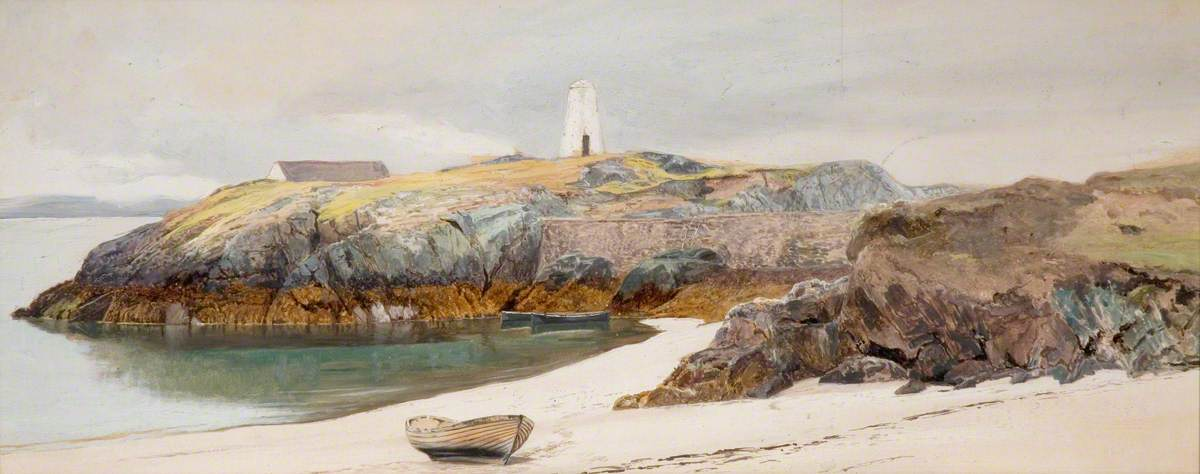
The Lighthouse, Llanddwyn, Wolverhampton Art Gallery, oil on paper

=== Novels ===
- The Great Revolution of 1905; or, The Story of the Phalanx, With an Introductory Account of Civilization in Great Britain at the Close of the Nineteenth Century (1893)
- Gwynett of Thornhaugh: A Romance (1900)
- A Kent Squire: Being a Record of Certain Adventures of Ambrose Gwynett, Esquire of Thornhaugh (1900)

=== Plays ===
- Doris
