= Montague Dawson =

English painter

- Born: Montague Dawson; 19 September 1890; Chiswick, London
- Died: 21 May 1973 (aged 82)
- Known for: Painting

Montague Dawson RSMA, FRSA (1890–1973) was a British painter who was renowned as a maritime artist. His most famous paintings depict sailing ships, usually clippers or warships of the 18th and 19th centuries.

== Life ==
Montague Dawson was the son of a keen yachtsman and the grandson of the landscape painter Henry Dawson (1811-1878), and was born in Chiswick, London. Much of his childhood was spent on Southampton Water where he was able to indulge his interest in the study of ships. For a brief period around 1910 Dawson worked for a commercial art studio in Bedford Row, London, but with the outbreak of the First World War he joined the Royal Navy. Whilst serving with the Navy in Falmouth he met Charles Napier Hemy (1841–1917), who considerably influenced his work. Towards the end of the War Dawson was serving as a Lieutenant RNVR in the Dazzle Painting Section at Leith. In 1924 Dawson was the official artist for an Expedition to the South Seas by the steam yacht St. George. During the expedition he provided illustrated reports to The Graphic periodical.

During these years his artwork was also published in the newspaper The Sphere. His works are featured in the Royal Naval Museum and the National Maritime Museum. Dawson was present at the final surrender of the German High Seas Fleet and many of his illustrations depicting the event were published in The Sphere.

After the War, Dawson established himself as a professional marine artist, concentrating on historical subjects and portraits of deep-water sailing ships often in stiff breeze or on high seas. During the Second World War, he was employed as a war artist and again worked for The Sphere. Dawson exhibited regularly at the Royal Society of Marine Artists, of which he became a member, from 1946 to 1964, and occasionally at the Royal Academy between 1917 and 1936. By the 1930s he was considered one of the greatest living marine artists, whose patrons included two American Presidents, Dwight D Eisenhower and Lyndon B Johnson, as well as the British royal family. Also in the 1930s, he moved to Milford-Upon-Sea in Hampshire, living there for many years. Dawson is noted for the strict accuracy in the nautical detail of his paintings, which can sell for five figures, and have been often reproduced as prints.

== Collections ==
Montague Dawson's work can be found in a number of public collections including:

- Kalamazoo Institute of Arts, Kalamazoo, Michigan, USA
- National Maritime Museum, England
- The Mariners' Museum, Newport News, Virginia, USA
- The Historic Dockyard Chatham, Kent, England (HMS Jervis Bay -'The Convoy Got Through')
- Appleton Museum of Art, Ocala, Florida, USA (The Cutty Sark)
- William L. Clements Library, University of Michigan, Ann Arbor, Michigan, USA
