= Ynys Llanddwyn =

Tidal island near Anglesey, Wales

Coordinates: 53°08′15″N 04°24′45″W

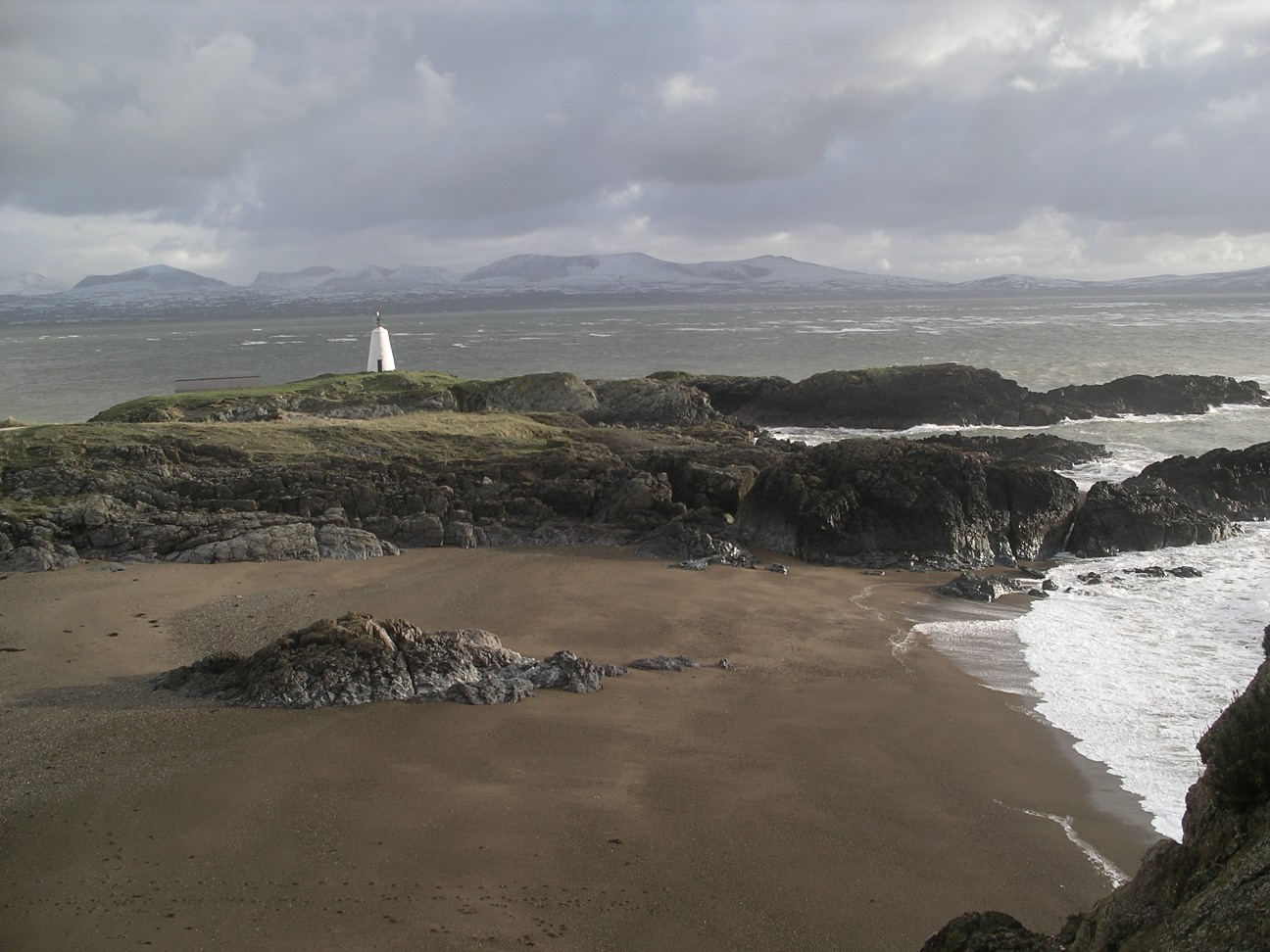
- Tŵr Bach lighthouse with Snowdonia in background

- Location within Anglesey
- Area: 0.3 km^{2} (0.12 sq mi)
- Population: 0
  - Density: 0/km^{2} (0/sq mi)
- OS grid reference: SH 3884 6288
- Community: Rhosyr
- Principal area: Isle of Anglesey
- Preserved county: Gwynedd
- Country: Wales
- Sovereign state: United Kingdom
- Police: North Wales
- Fire: North Wales
- Ambulance: Welsh
- UK Parliament: Ynys Môn
- Senedd Cymru – Welsh Parliament: Bangor Conwy Môn

Ynys Llanddwyn (Welsh for 'Llanddwyn Island') is a small tidal island off the west coast of Anglesey (Welsh: Ynys Môn), northwest Wales. The nearest settlement is the village of Newborough.

== Geology and geography ==
The island is of geological interest with pillow lava, jasper formations and aeolian sand deposits. The island forms part of the National Nature Reserve of Newborough Warren which includes the extensive and floristically rich sand dune system.

Ynys Llanddwyn is a tidal island; it remains attached to the mainland except at high tide. It provides views of Snowdonia and the Llŷn Peninsula. Tŵr Mawr lighthouse marks the western entrance to the Menai Strait.

=== IUGS geological heritage site ===
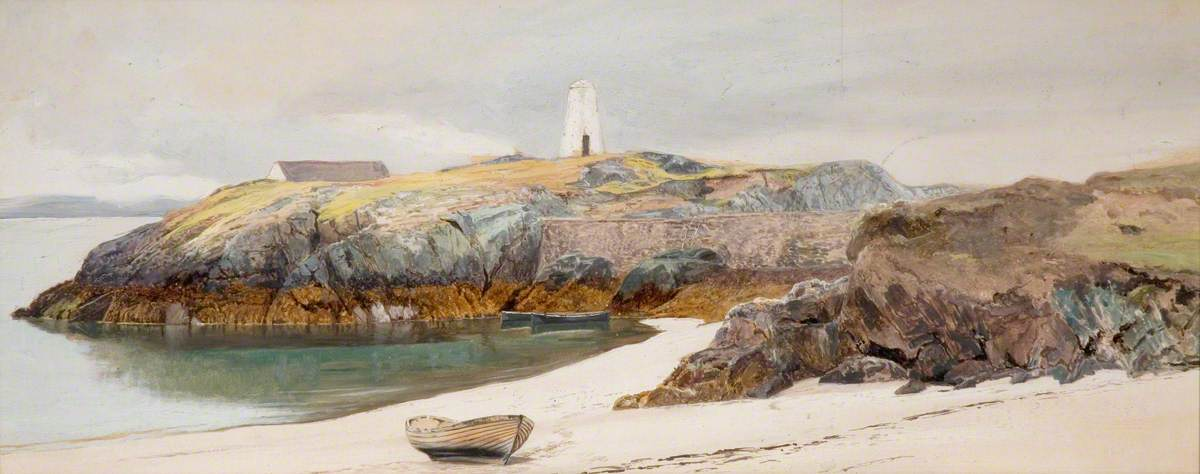
Frederick William Hayes, (1848-1918), The Lighthouse, Llanddwyn, Wolverhampton Art Gallery, oil on paper

In respect of the site having 'spectacular, accessible and well-preserved exposures of late Neoproterozoic-Cambrian mélange with more than 200 years of study', the International Union of Geological Sciences (IUGS) included the 'Ynys Llanddwyn late Neoproterozoic-Cambrian Mélange' in its assemblage of 100 'geological heritage sites' around the world in a listing published in October 2022. The organisation defines an IUGS Geological Heritage Site as 'a key place with geological elements and/or processes of international scientific relevance, used as a reference, and/or with a substantial contribution to the development of geological sciences through history.'

== Saint Dwynwen ==
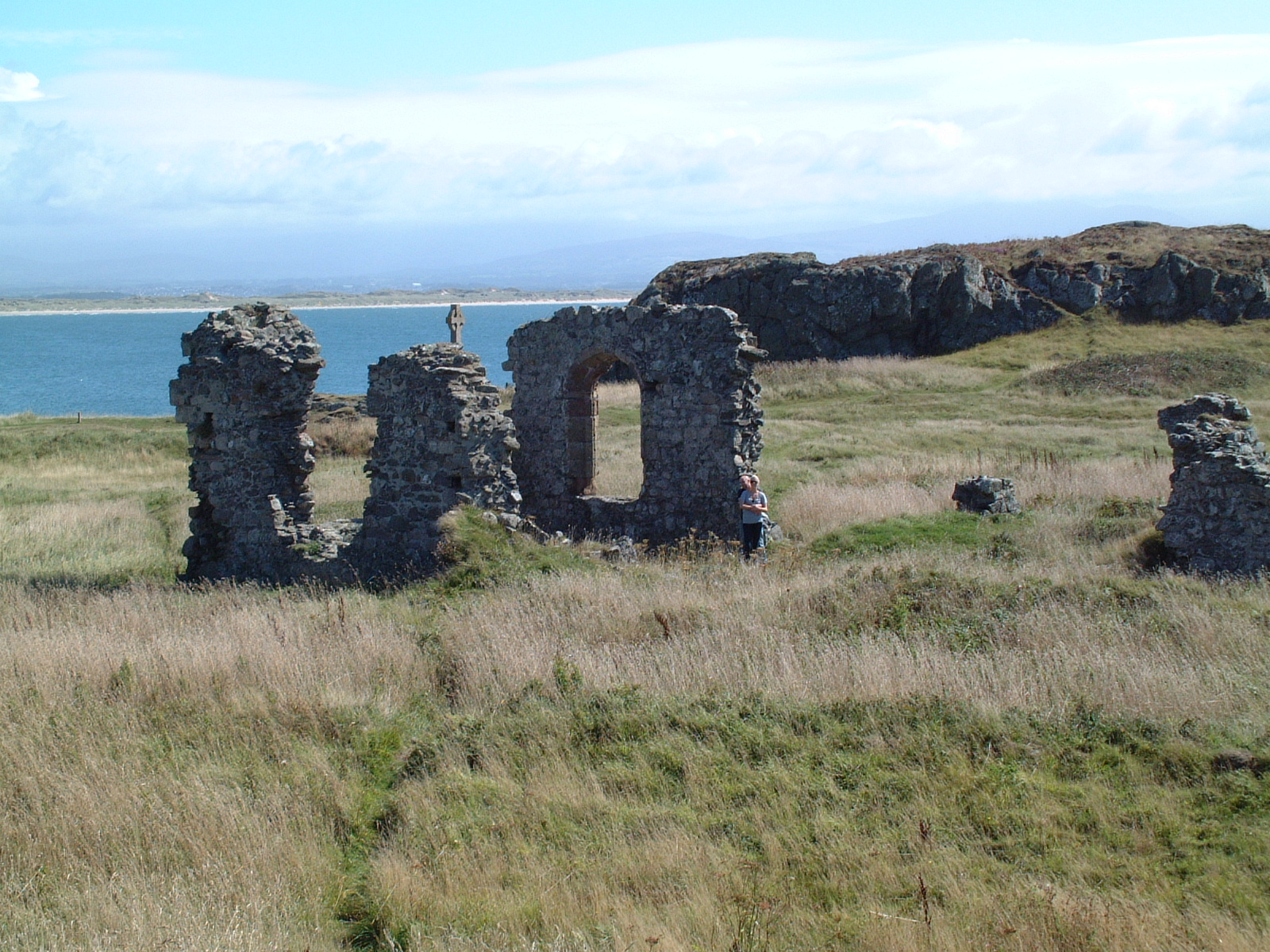
The ruins of St Dwynwen's Church, Llanddwyn

The island is rich in legends, in particular in its association with Dwynwen. The name Llanddwyn means "The church of St. Dwynwen". Dwynwen is the Welsh patron saint of lovers, making her the Welsh equivalent of St. Valentine. Her Saint's day is 25 January and is often celebrated by the Welsh with cards and flowers. The island bears the ruined remains of 5th century St. Dwynwen's Church (Welsh: Eglwys Santes Dwynwen). Unusually for churches in that region it has a cruciform floorplan.

Archaeologists examined the ruins of St Dwynwen's in 2011 and again in 2021. The 2021 dig discovered traces of even older buildings below the ruins.

== Visitors and footpaths ==
Newborough National Nature Reserve & Forest, of which Ynys Llanddwyn is part, received 478,204 visitors in 2018.

There are more than 10 miles (16 km) of footpaths crossing Ynys Llanddwyn and Newborough Warren, including the Anglesey Coastal Path, and it is a very popular place to visit. The island provides a worth-while goal after the mile-long walk along the beach from the nearest car park. Ynys Llanddwyn, with the neighbouring beach, has been awarded Blue Flag beach status in recognition of the cleanliness of the sea and the beaches.

== Timeline ==
- 1873 – Construction of lighthouse on Ynys Llanddwyn.
- 1903 – Closure of the lifeboat station on Ynys Llanddwyn.
- 1911 – RSPB establishes its first reserve in Wales at Ynys Llanddwyn
- 3 December 1920 – Five crew members from the Rhoscolyn lifeboat are lost off Llanddwyn, Anglesey.

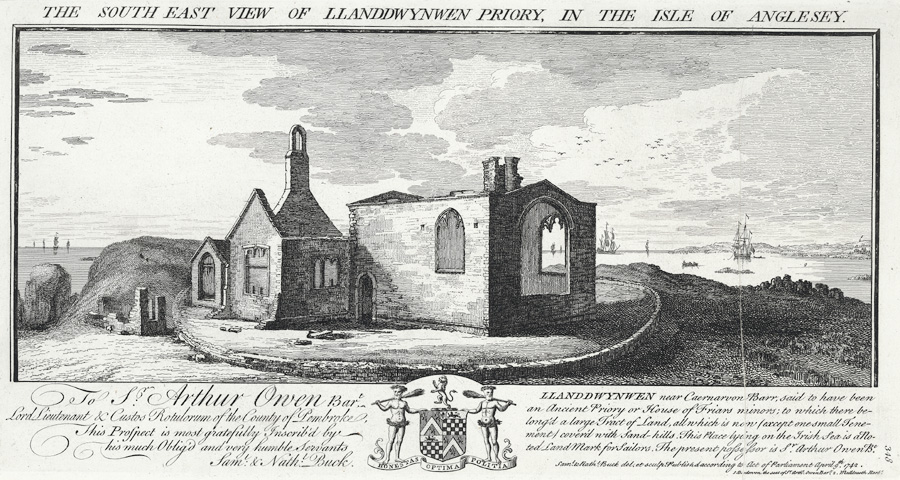
The south east view of St Dwynwen's Church depicted on a print engraving from 1742 by publishers Samuel and Nathaniel Buck.

== In film ==
- In 2004, Ynys Llanddwyn was used as a filming location in Demi Moore's romantic thriller Half Light. Tŵr Mawr was used as a lighthouse which plays a key role in the film. CGI was used to create the effect of a real light on top of the lighthouse.
- Bryn Terfel filmed his video for Cavatina (arranged by Chris Hazell) on Ynys Llanddwyn "a very beautiful romantic place" (Bryn on BBC Breakfast)
- In 2009, a scene for the Hollywood blockbuster Clash of the Titans was filmed at Llanddwyn.
- BBC Wales show The 1900 Island was filmed on the island; the show was broadcast nationally in 2019.

== Photos ==
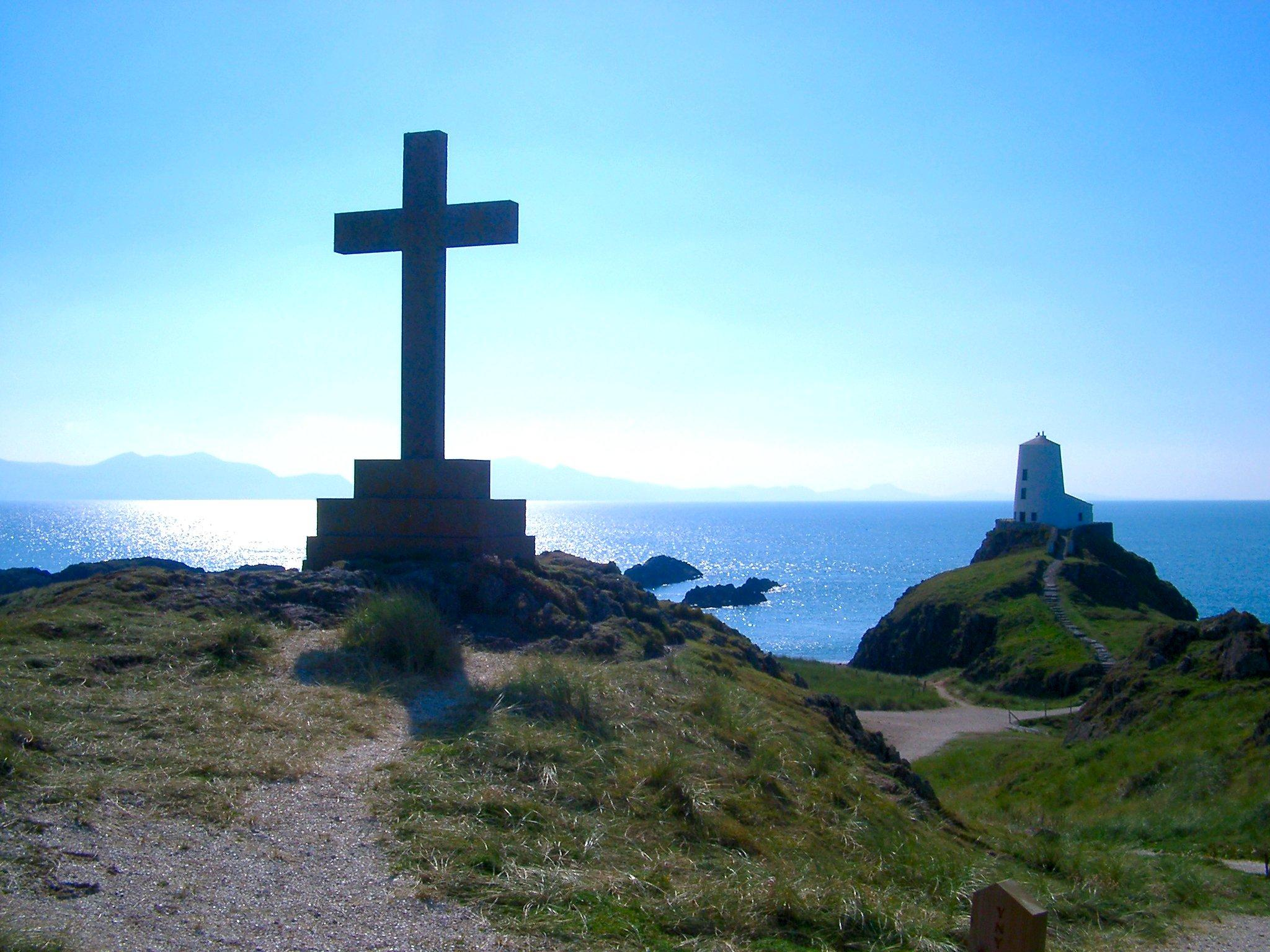
Tŵr Mawr lighthouse and cross at Llanddwyn.

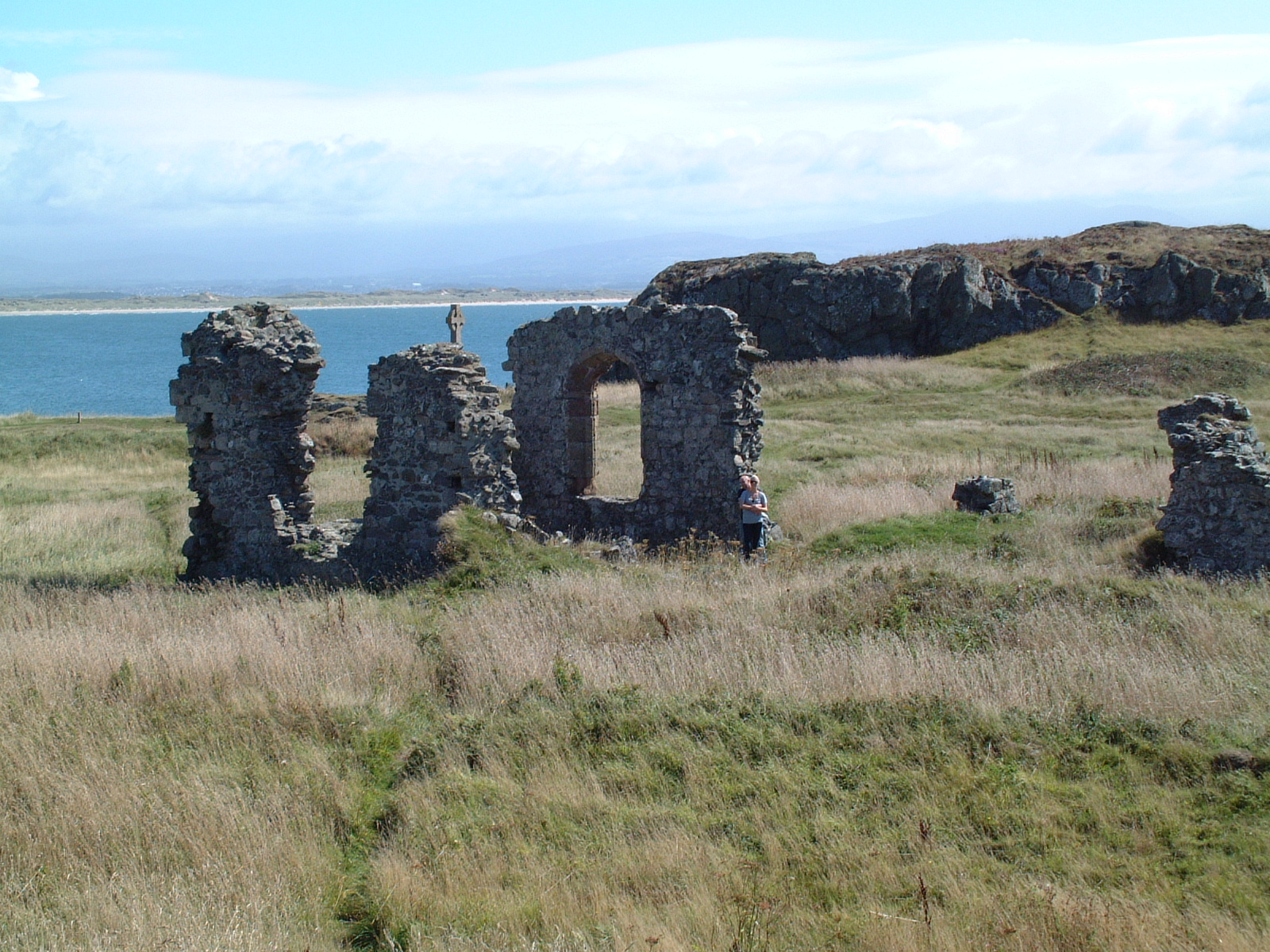
St Dwynwen's Church

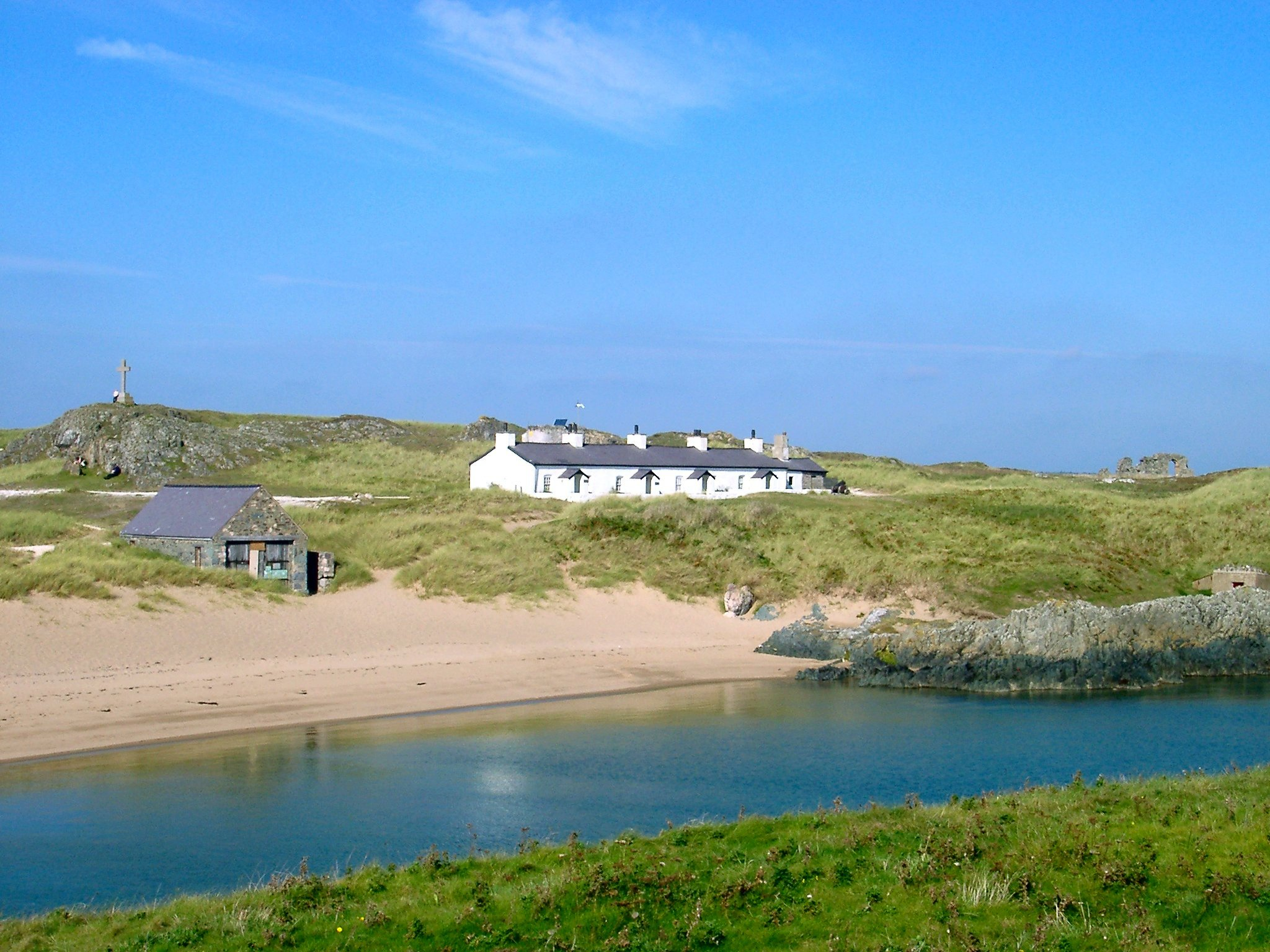
Pilots' cottages

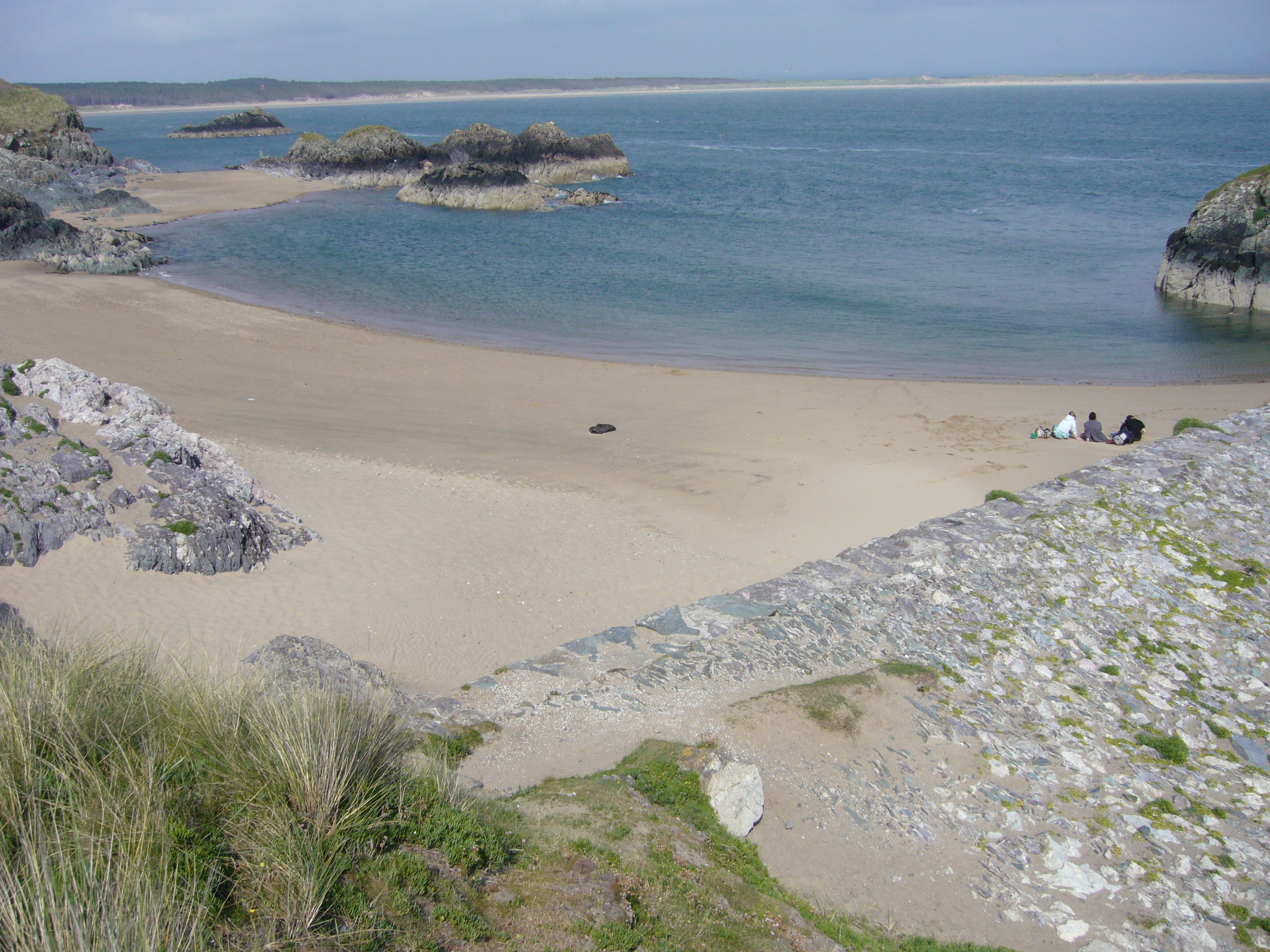
Beach

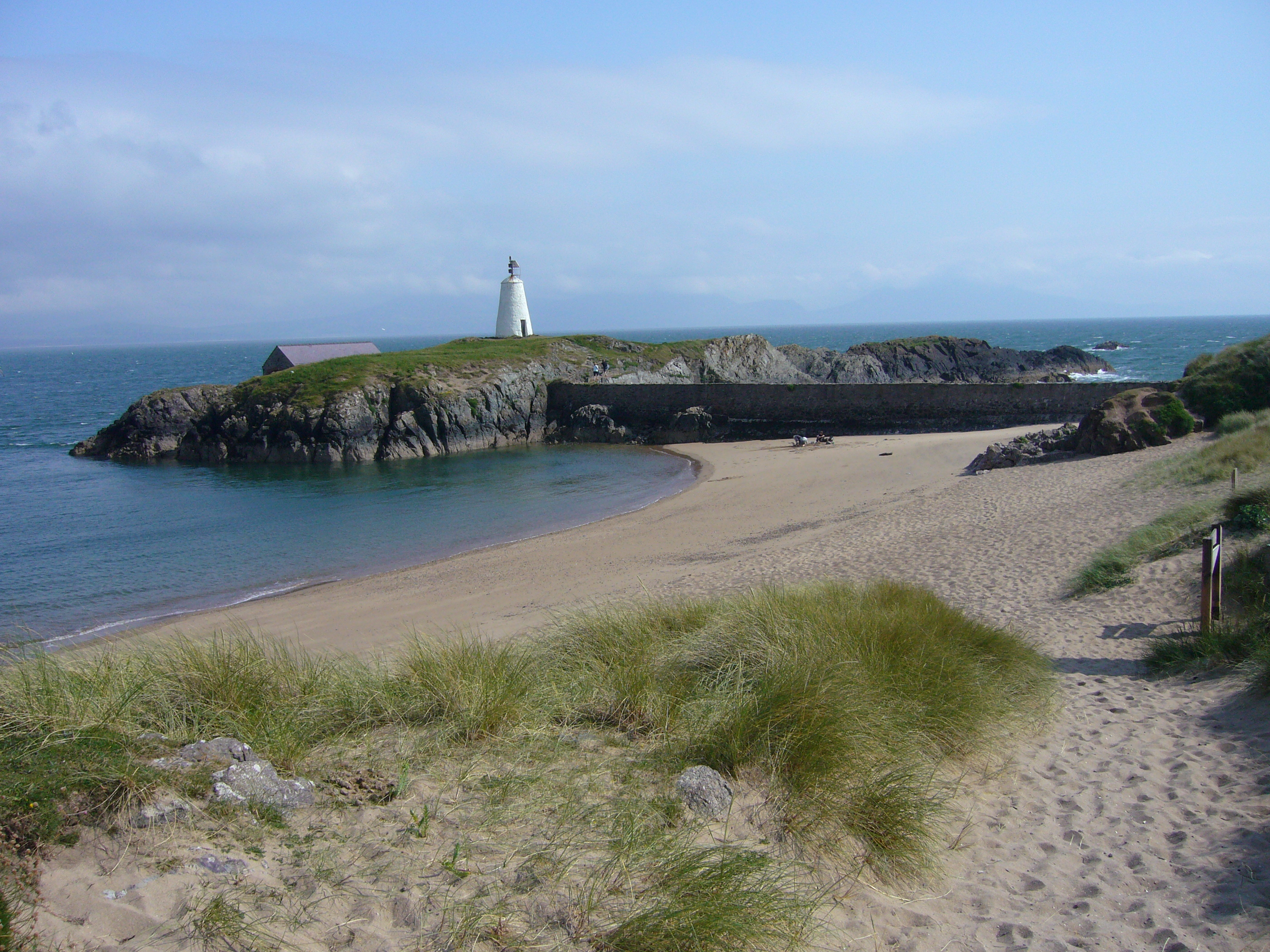
Beach

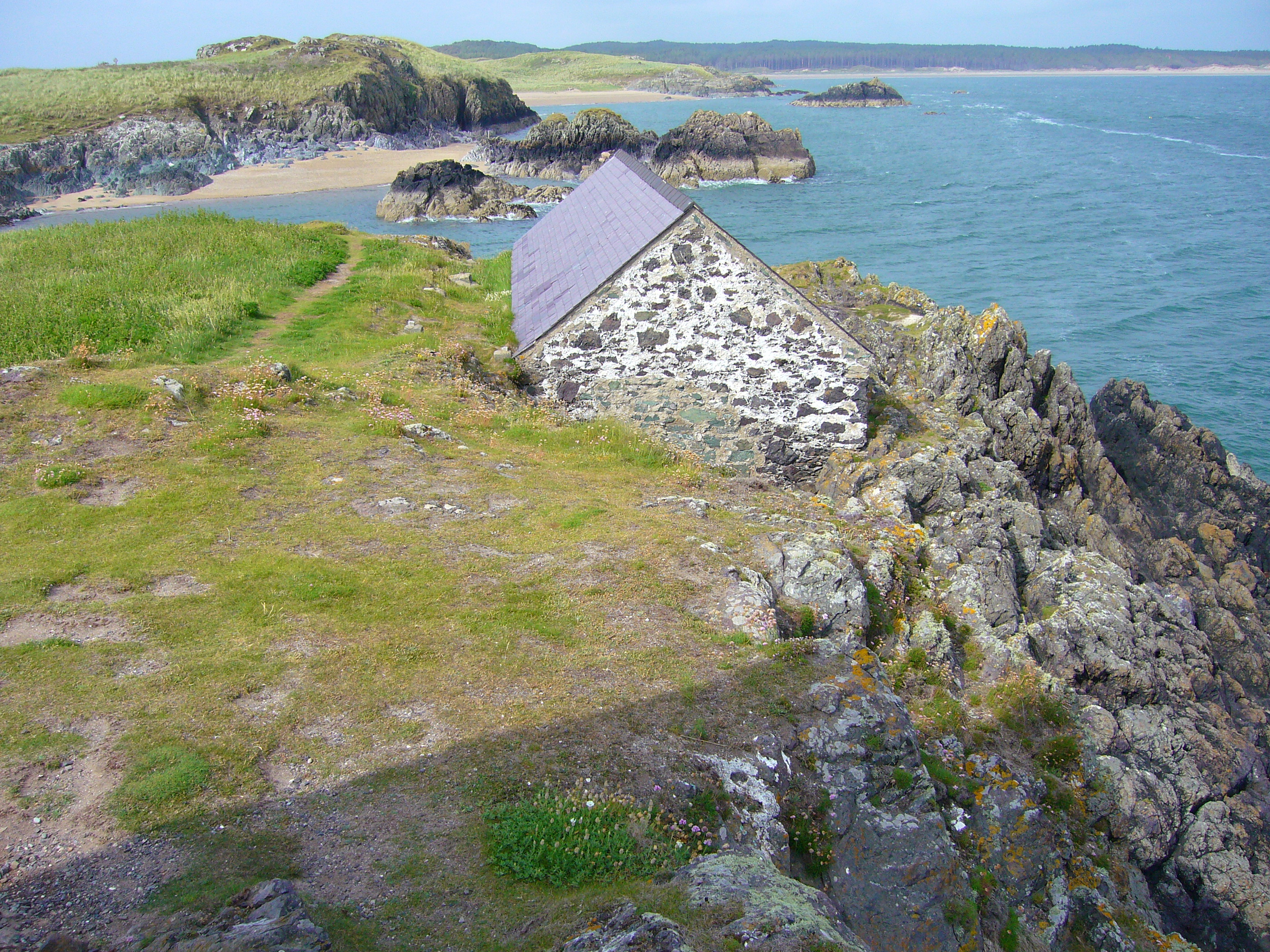
View towards the mainland

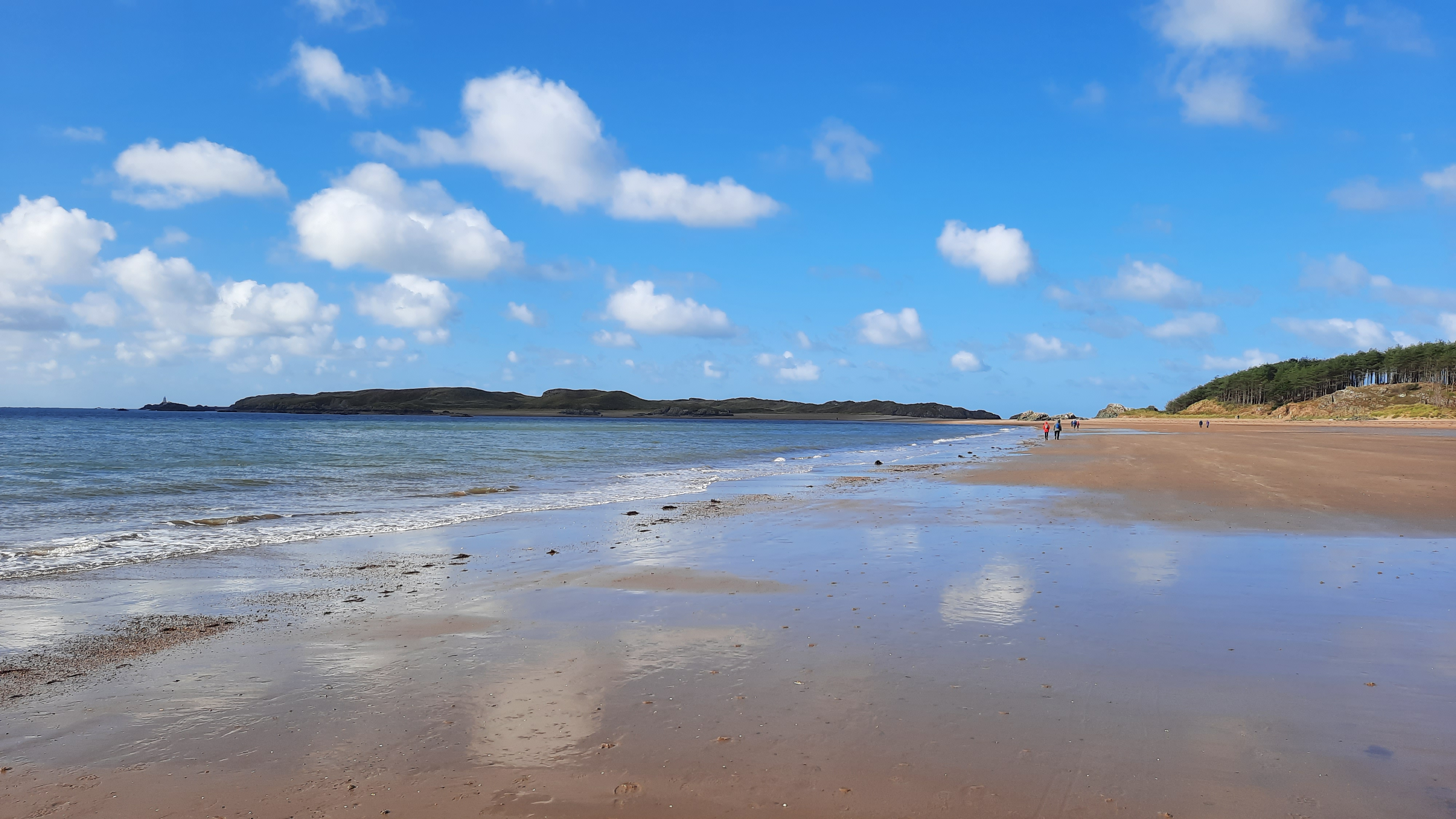
Ynys Llanddwyn from Newborough Beach at low tide

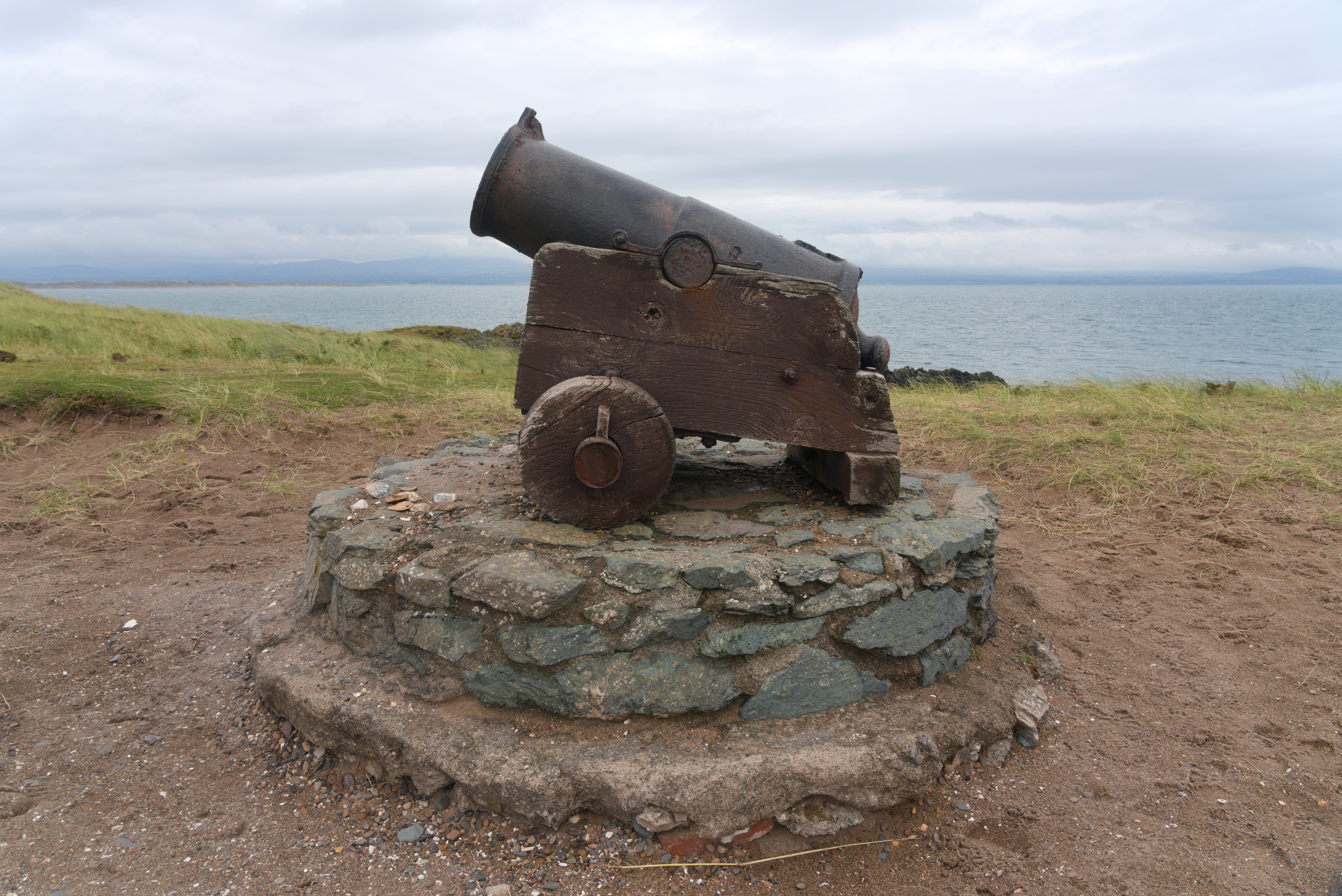
Cannon
