= Tŵr Mawr Lighthouse =

Former lighthouse in Anglesey, Wales

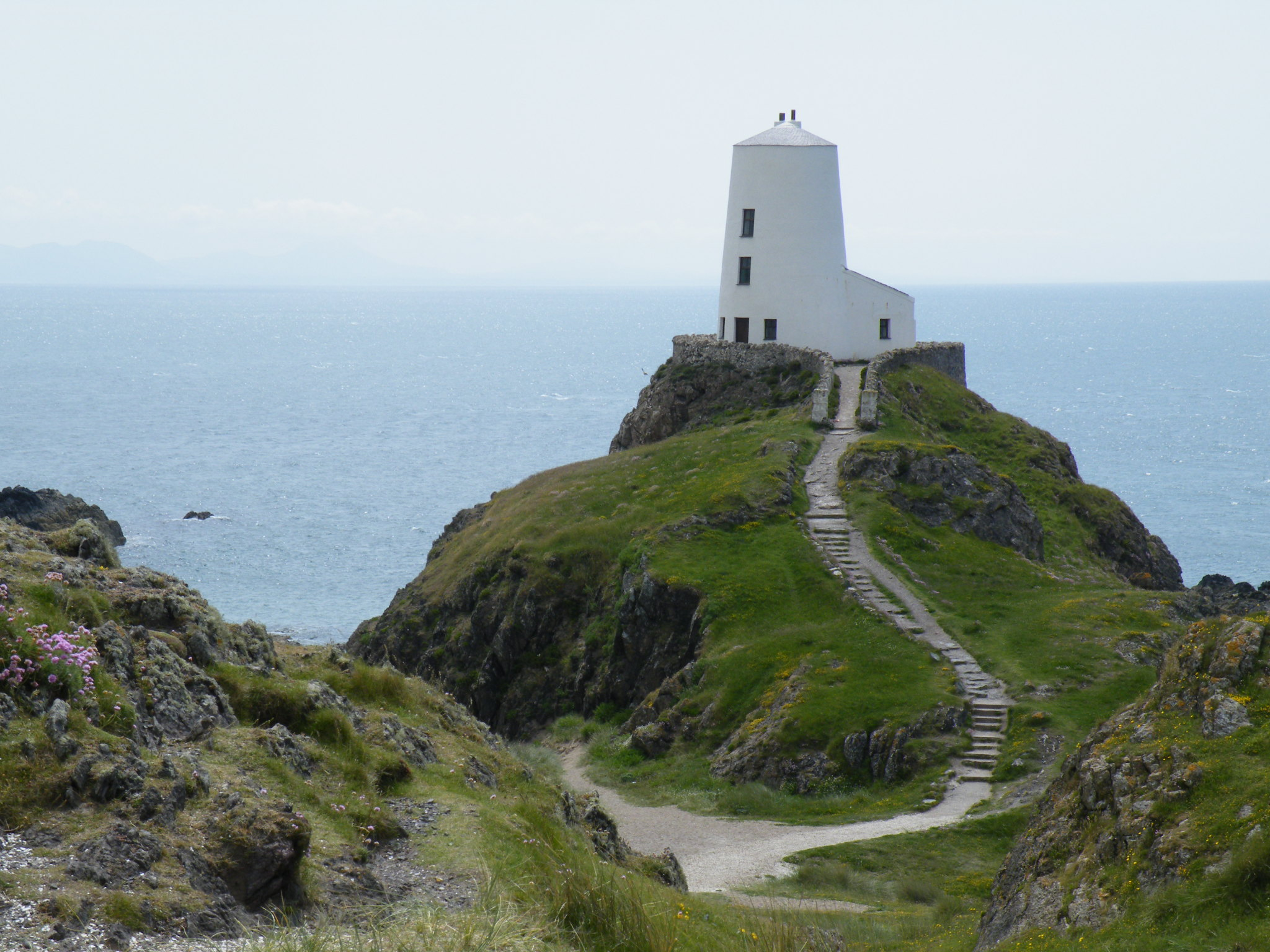
- Tŵr Mawr lighthouse
- Location: Ynys Llanddwyn; Anglesey; Wales; United Kingdom
- Coordinates: 53.135165°N 4.415574°W

Tower
- Constructed: 1845
- Construction: stone tower
- Height: 11 metres (36 ft)
- Shape: massive conical tower and roof
- Markings: white tower
- Operator: Llanddwyn Island National Nature Reserve
- Heritage: Grade II listed building

Light
- Deactivated: 1975
- Focal height: 25 metres (82 ft)
- Range: 7 nautical miles (13 km; 8.1 mi)

Tŵr Mawr lighthouse (meaning "great tower" in Welsh), on Ynys Llanddwyn on Anglesey, Wales, marks the western entrance to the Menai Strait.

== History ==
Caernarfon harbour board commissioned improvements to a "day mark" (an unlit tower) in 1842, because of the proximity of Llanddwyn Point to the harbour bar. The light came into service in 1846. The lantern and fittings cost £250 7s 6d, including the adaptation of the earlier tower. The lantern, originally comprising six Argand lamps burning colzo oil and fitted with catoptric reflectors, was made by De Ville & Co, London. It projected a fixed red beam from a window on the ground floor of the attached "lean-to" building. This was visible over distance of five miles (in clear weather) between bearings of N.W. by N. and S.W. by W., to provide a marker for the entrance to Menai Strait. A black ball was hoisted from a signal staff to indicate when there was a depth of at least ten feet of water over the Carnarfon bar.

A smaller, conical tower, with a domed top, is located to the south-east, and may be an earlier structure. The walls are 6 feet 8 inches (2.03 m) in radius and 3 feet (0.91 m) thick, with a door to the north-west, and show signs of cracking to the rubble-filled walls on the west.

Neither tower is shown on the chart of Lewis Morris, dated 1801, but they both appear on the Ordnance Survey 1818-1823 2 inches/mile map. They both probably originated as unlit markers. The cottages nearby have been used as craft workshops, and the local community here once serviced pilot-boats and lifeboats.

The tower is tapered in a style characteristic of Anglesey windmills. It is 33 feet (10 m) high and 18 feet (5.5 m) in diameter. It may have been constructed by an Anglesey stone mason, and it is possible that the tower itself was originally used as a windmill. The higher floors in the tower provided accommodation. The north-east door is flanked by small windows, and the two floors above also have small windows, but the top does not. The conical roof is slated and has a flagpole. The lantern window is about 6 feet 6 inches (1.98 m) by 2 feet (0.61 m).

The lighthouse was designated as Grade II listed building in 1996.

== Replacement ==
In 1975 the function of the Tŵr Mawr lighthouse was taken over when more modern equipment, showing flashing red and white sector lights, was installed in the nearby smaller tower, the Tŵr Bach ("Little Tower") lighthouse (53.1343°N 4.4129°W).

== See also ==
- List of lighthouses in Wales
