= Cornelius van der Strete =

Cornelius van der Strete (died 1529) was a tapestry worker at the courts of Henry VII and Henry VIII of England.

He was appointed Arras maker to Henry VII in 1502.

In 1503 the king's daughter Margaret Tudor went to Scotland as the bride of James IV. Cornelius van der Strete was paid £7-8s for making or supplying 74 Flemish sticks of tapestry for her. The historian and curator Thomas P. Campbell suggests his own works were simple armorial tapestries or borders to be attached to figural tapestries purchased elsewhere. Strete's work producing such tapestries may have been influenced by the preferences of Catherine of Aragon.

Cornelius van der Strete and his twelve colleagues travelled to Nottingham Castle in August 1511 to mend and line tapestries, table carpets, and counterpoints. The tapestries, described as verdure and 96 pieces of hawking and hunting, were lined with canvas and mended with woollen yarn.

In 1514 he supplied tapestry including a suite of the Labours of Hercules from Bruges for Mary Tudor, Queen of France. Cornelius continued to mend and repair tapestries, and insert the royal badges of roses and portcullises to newly purchased pieces. His wages in 1516 were twelve pence daily.

Cornelius van der Strete died in 1529.
