= 1831 reform riots =

British civil disturbance

The 1831 Bristol riots, which was part of the wider wave of riots

The 1831 reform riots occurred after Tory legislators voted against the Second Reform Bill in Parliament in October 1831. Civil disturbances occurred in London, Leicester, Yeovil, Sherborne, Exeter, Bath and Worcester; and riots at Nottingham, Derby and Bristol. Targets included Nottingham Castle, home of the anti-reform Duke of Newcastle, other private houses and jails. In Bristol, three days of rioting followed the arrival in the city of the anti-reform judge Charles Wetherell. A large portion of the city centre was burnt, £300,000 of damage inflicted, and perhaps as many as 250 persons killed or wounded.

== Background ==
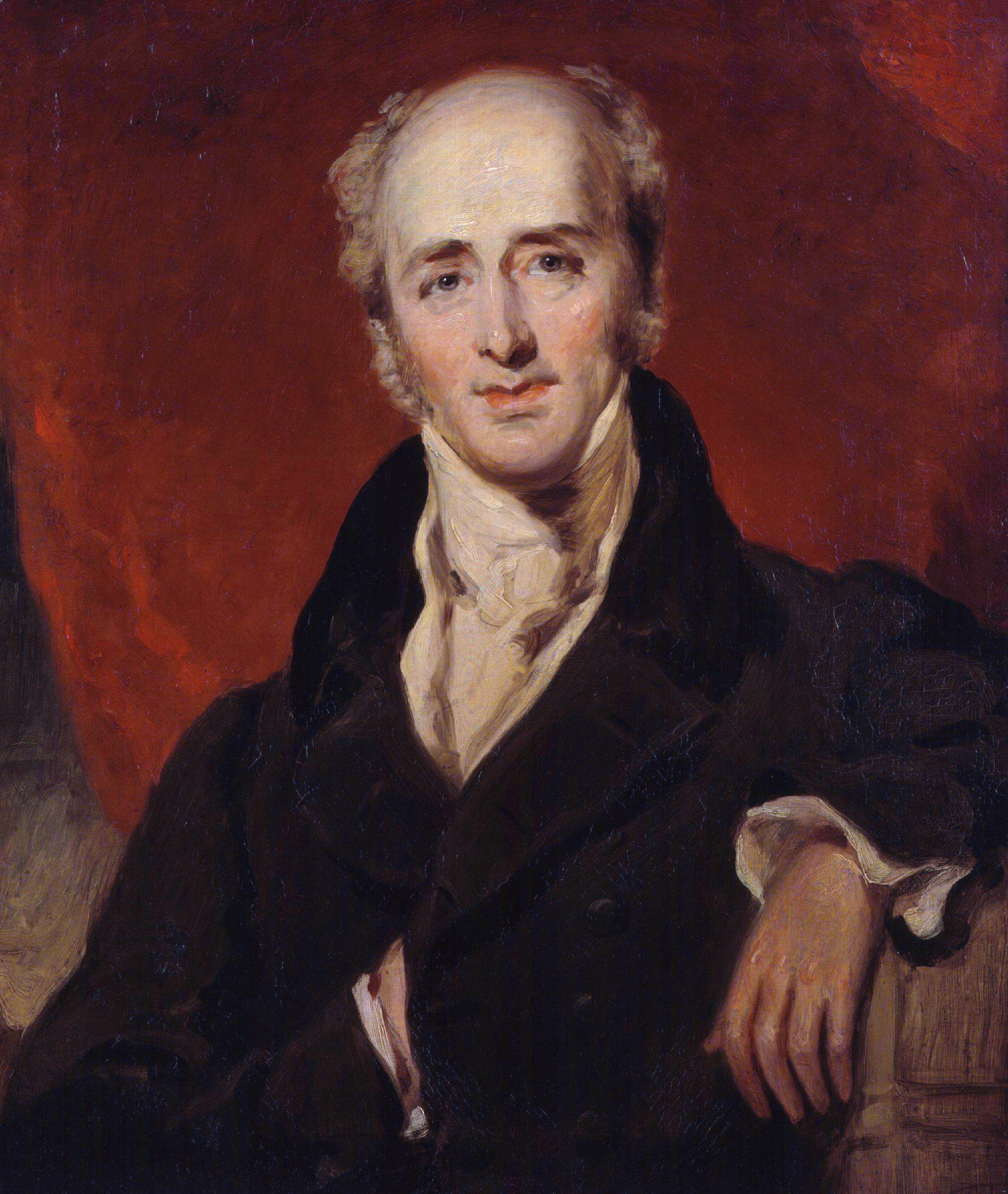
British Prime Minister Earl Grey

The British parliament consists of two houses: the House of Lords and the House of Commons. In the early 19th century the House of Lords was populated by hereditary peers and the House of Commons by Members of Parliament (MPs) elected in constituencies. The boundaries of the constituencies had not been redrawn to reflect population change for many decades, so there were many so-called pocket boroughs with less than 100 voters and rotten boroughs, where only few hundred or thousand voters elected one or two MPs, while Manchester and other large urban centres elected no MPs. The franchise was small with only 5% of Britons able to cast a vote.

In March 1831, Whigs introduced a Reform Bill to address the matter. This was defeated in parliament, and the prime minister, Earl Grey, resigned. Grey was returned to office with a majority in the subsequent general election and introduced a second Reform Bill. This passed in the House of Commons, but was defeated in the Lords on 8 October 1831.

The rejection of the bill and the second resignation of Grey resulted in political unrest and social disorder that was characterised as "the closest that Britain came to revolution". Inhabitants of cities and towns expressed anger at the failure to pass the bill. Serious disturbances occurred in London, Leicester, Yeovil, Sherborne, Exeter, Bath and Worcester. The disturbances in Birmingham were so severe that the British Army's Scots Greys cavalry regiment was deployed to the city. Full-scale riots erupted in Bristol, Nottingham and Derby.

== Nottingham and Derby ==
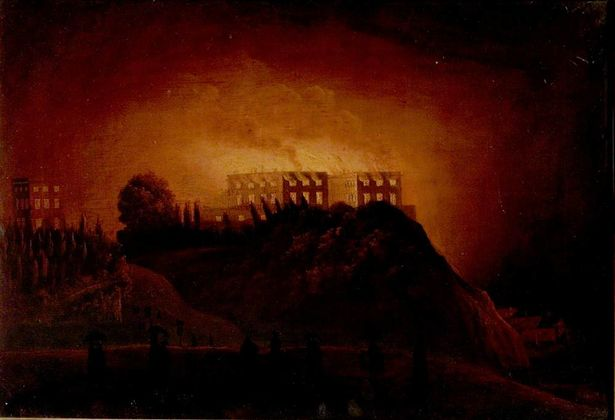
Nottingham Castle on Fire, 10 October 1831 by Henry Dawson

Rioting broke out in Nottingham on 9 October upon learning of the defeat of the bill. This was initially directed against the private houses of known opponents of reform. On 10 October a public meeting turned to violence, the attendees marched on Colwick Hall, home of John Musters, which was damaged. The same day the mob burned Nottingham Castle, home of anti-reform peer Henry Pelham-Clinton, 4th Duke of Newcastle, who was away at parliament. Jails in Derby and Markeaton were also attacked and Lowe's Silk Mill in Beeston was burnt on 11 October, the same day the riots ceased. The Duke was able to gather yeomanry and his own tenants to successfully defend his residence at Clumber Park.

On 4 January 1832, 26 men arrested during the riots were tried by a special commission, the local magistrates being suspected of having possible sympathies with the defendants. Eight of these men were found guilty, though none were brought to justice for the attack on the castle, and three were hanged on 25 January. The Duke accused the Nottingham magistrates and the Home Office of failing to prevent the riots and, after a lengthy dispute, was awarded £21,000 in damages in August 1832. In protest at the event the Duke refused to restore the castle and the burnt shell stood on the site for some time afterwards. He also halted works on The Park Estate, a housing development described as "the Belgravia of Nottingham".

== Bristol ==
Rioting took place in Bristol after the arrival of anti-reform judge Charles Wetherell in the city for the annual assizes on 29 October. Wetherell's carriage was attacked and civic and military authorities lost control of the situation. There followed two days of rioting and looting in which much of the city centre was burned and prisoners freed from the jails. The riots were brought to an end on 31 October by which time £300,000 of damage had been caused and up to 250 casualties incurred.

The Bristol Corporation, the local authority, was criticised for its handling of the riots. Its mayor, Charles Pinney was tried for neglect of duty and found not guilty. The military commander, Lieutenant-Colonel Thomas Brereton, was court-martialled for his actions in the event though killed himself before he could be sentenced. A royal commission found the corporation incapable of controlling the city and it was subsequently reformed by the Municipal Corporations Act 1835.

== Passing of the Reform Act ==
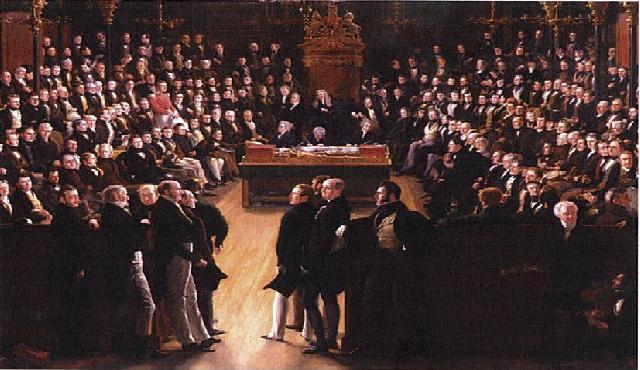
The House of Commons, 1833 by George Hayter. The first meeting of the reformed House of Commons

Grey resigned after the loss of the vote and King William IV called upon the Duke of Wellington, leader of the Tory party, to form a government. Wellington was unable to secure the support necessary during a period of political uncertainty known as the Days of May and so Grey's government was recalled. The Whigs voted a Third Reform Bill through the House of Commons and it was sent to the House of Lords. The king, who had previously been opposed to reform, now agreed to use his powers to create enough new pro-reform peers to overcome the Tory majority in the upper house. This action did not need to be carried out as the Tory lords, threatened with an influx of Whigs, abstained on the vote and the bill passed. The bill, afterwards known as the Great Reform Act, received royal assent on 7 June 1832.

The act removed many of the rotten boroughs and granted new seats to the industrial towns and cities. The franchise was, on the whole, extended being granted to any man who owned property worth £10 or more. In some boroughs, the so-called potwallopers, this actually reduced the electorate as they had previously granted the vote to any man with a hearth big enough to boil a cauldron. Local government was investigated by the Royal Commission on Municipal Corporations in 1833 and the subsequent Municipal Corporations Act 1835 applied reforms to many, including Bristol.
