= Charles I Raising His Standard =

Painting by Henry Dawson

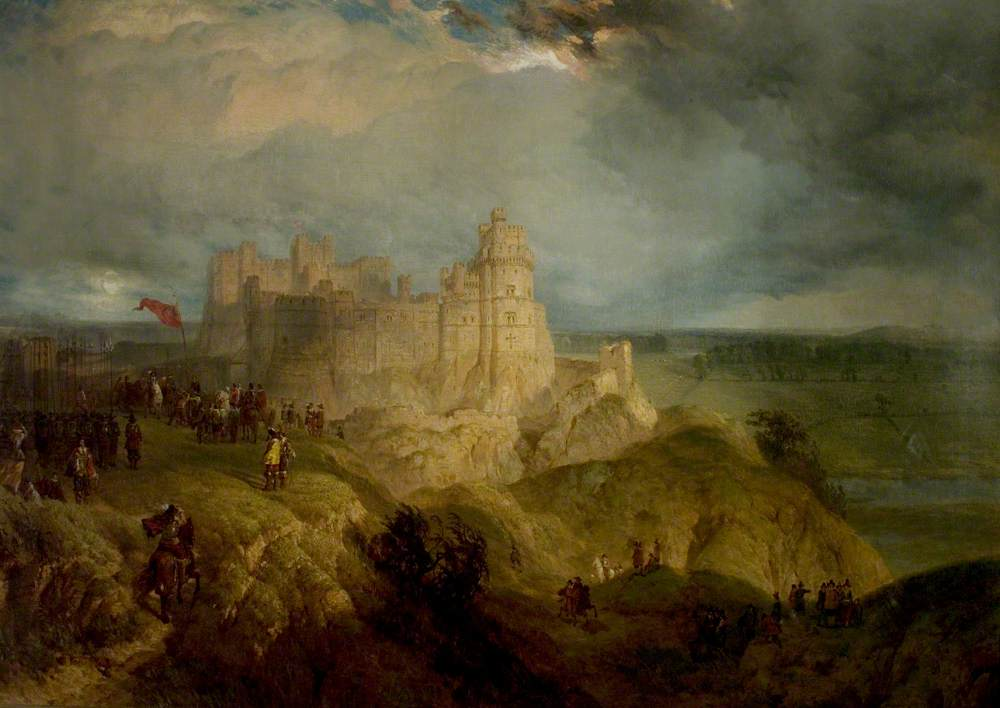
- Artist: Henry Dawson
- Year: 1847
- Type: Oil on canvas, history painting
- Dimensions: 147.3 cm × 238.8 cm (58.0 in × 94.0 in)
- Location: Nottingham Castle, Nottingham

Charles I Raising His Standard is an 1847 history painting by the British artist Henry Dawson.

== Description ==
The painting depicts a scene from the opening stages of the English Civil War. After leaving London, Charles I raised his standard on 24 August 1642 outside Nottingham Castle in the Midlands, rallying supporters to his cause. Charles ultimately lost the war to his opponents and was executed in 1649.

Dawson uses artistic license to reimagine the old medieval castle at Nottingham. It was replaced during the Restoration era by an Italianate manor house that still stands today. Dawson depicts the castle as largely intact, whereas in reality it was already largely a ruin before the outbreak of the war. The painting is now in the art collection at Nottingham Castle, having been acquired in 1912.

== Bibliography ==
- Chappel, Jeannie. Victorian Taste: The Complete Catalogue of Paintings at the Royal Holloway College. A. Zwemmer, 1982.
- Darlington, John. Fake Heritage: Why We Rebuild Monuments. Yale University Press, 2020.
- Dawson, Alfred. The Life of Henry Dawson, Landscape Painter, 1811-1878. Seeley, 1891.
