= Henry Dawson (artist) =

English painter

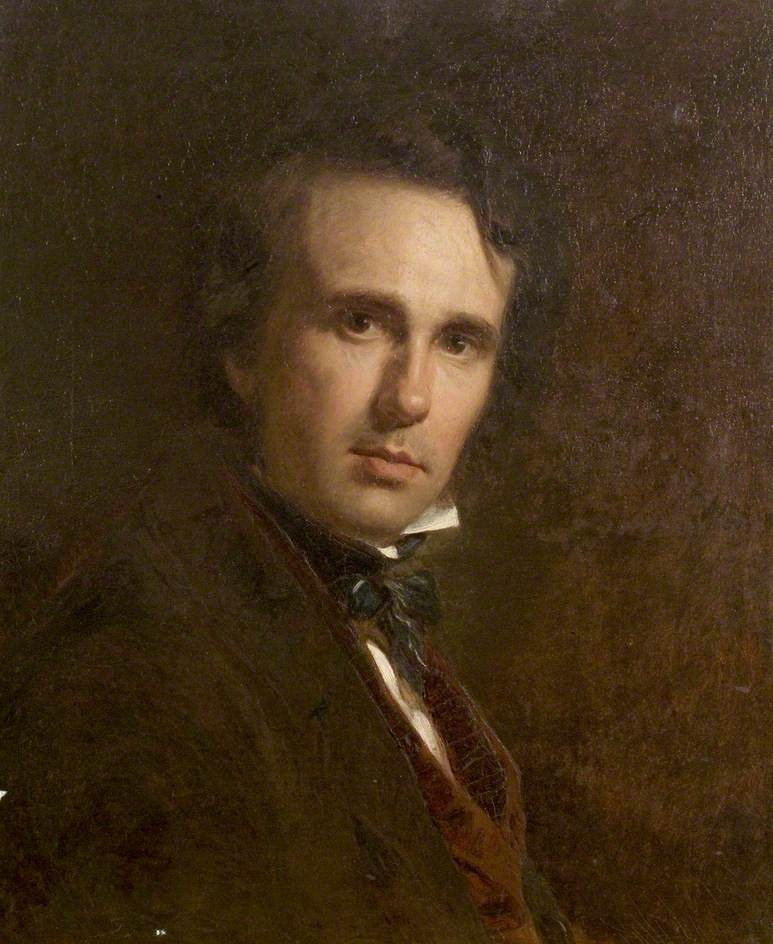
Self-portrait (Henry Dawson)

Henry Dawson (1811–1878) was a British landscape painter.

Born in Kingston upon Hull, Dawson went with his parents to Nottingham when he was still an infant and always regarded the latter as his native town. His parents were poor, and he began life in a Nottingham lace factory. But even while engaged in lace-making he continued to find time for art, and used to paint small pictures, which he sold at first for about half-a-crown each. In 1835 he gave up the lace trade and set up as an artist, his earliest patron being a hairdresser in Nottingham, who possessed a taste for art. In 1844 he removed to Liverpool, where after a time he got into greater repute, and received higher prices for his works. In 1849 he came with his family to London, and settled at Croydon, where some of his best pictures were painted. Among these may be reckoned 'The Wooden Walls of Old England,' exhibited at the British Institution in 1853, 'The Rainbow,' 'The Rainbow at Sea,' 'London Bridge,' and ' London at Sunrise.'

With the exception of six lessons from Pyne received in 1838, Henry Dawson was entirely a self-taught artist, and his art shows much originality and careful realism. He studied nature for himself, but he seems in later life to have been moved by Turner's influence to try more brilliant effects than he had before dared. Many of his works indeed are very Turneresque in treatment, though he can scarcely be called an imitator of Turner, for he had a distinct style of his own.

Henry Dawson, though painting much, and selling his pictures for high prices in his later life, remained, strange to say, very little known except to artists and connoisseurs until the large and very interesting collection of his works that was made for the Nottingham Exhibition in 1878 brought him wider fame. This exhibition showed him to be a genuine English landscape painter, of no great imaginative or intellectual power, but who delighted in nature, and represented her faithfully to the best of his ability. He died in December 1878, at Chiswick, where he had for some time resided.

Dawson's "only regular pupil, as understood in the old sense" was the landscape painter Frederick William Hayes, and two sons were artists: Henry Thomas Dawson (fl. 1860-78) a marine painter, and Alfred (fl. 1860-93) who produced landscapes and etchings. Dawson's grandson was the 20th-century marine painter Montague Dawson.

Dawson's son Alfred Dawson published The Life of Henry Dawson, Landscape Painter, 1811-1878 in 1891, a compact biography (127 pages) with long extracts from Dawson's own journals and letters, as well as Alfred's commentary. There are lists of paintings and much information as to the prices he got for them, which jumped considerably in the early 1870s. Dawson attributed much of this to the efforts of his friend James Orrock in getting him better prices. However, his health was precarious during the 1870s, as the Life records.

== Gallery ==
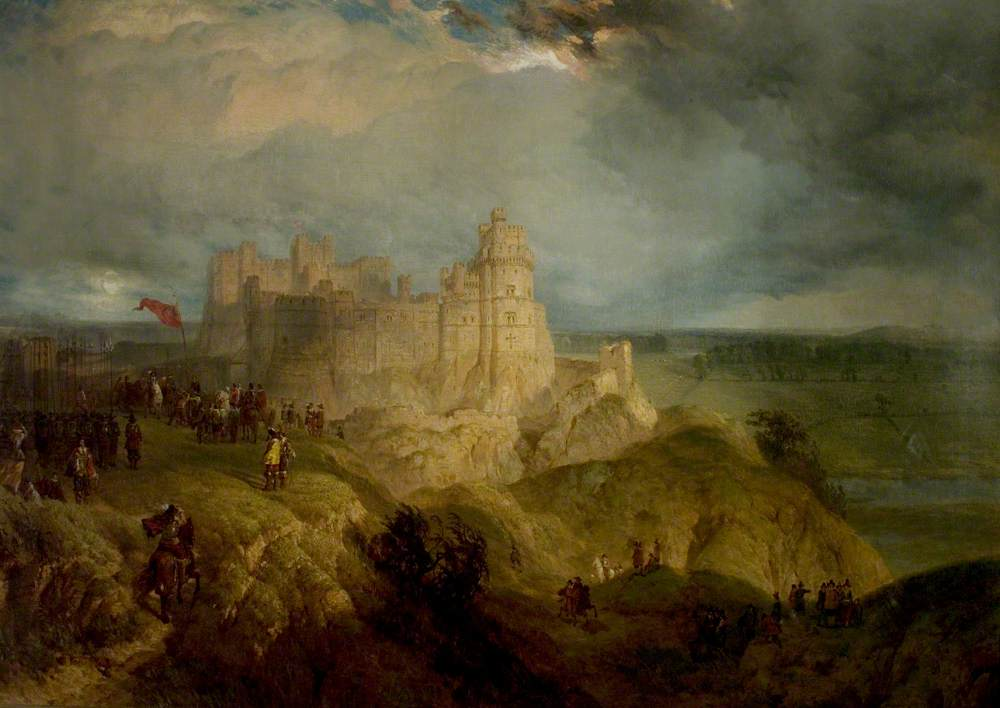
Charles I Raising His Standard, 1847

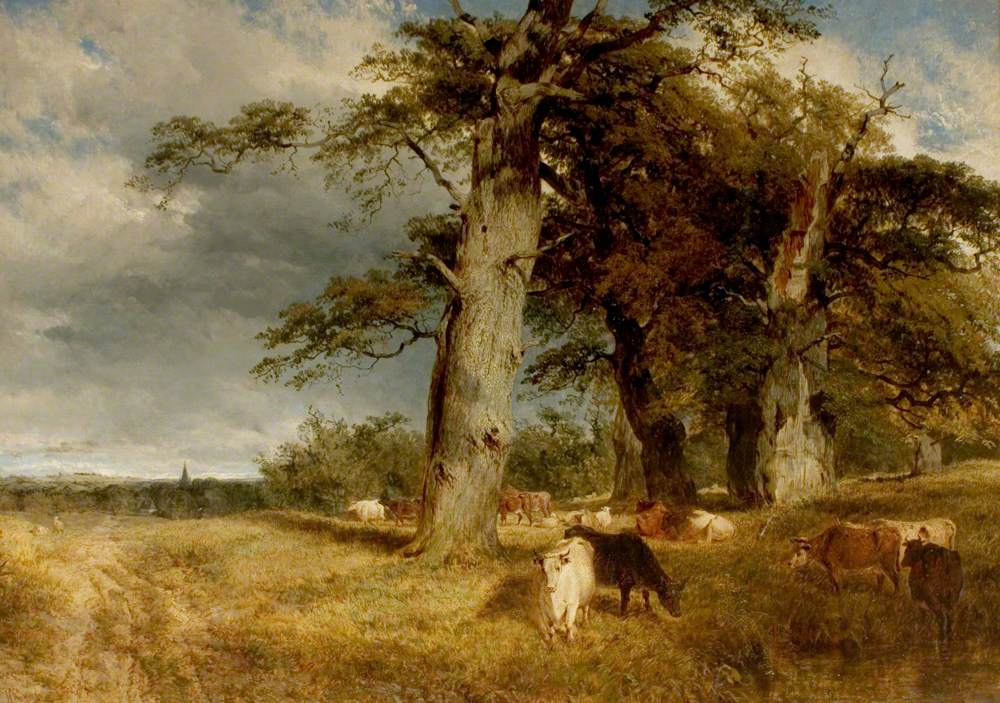
Landscape in the Dukeries, Nottinghamshire, 1850

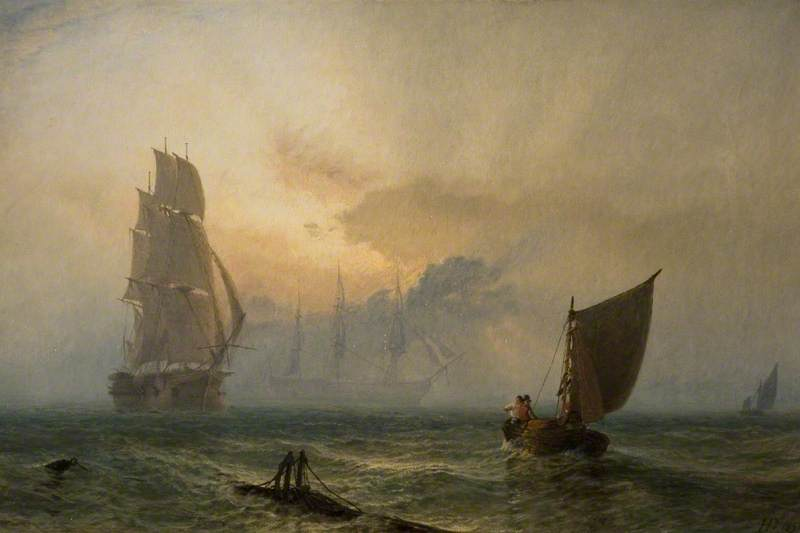
The Wooden Walls of England, 1856

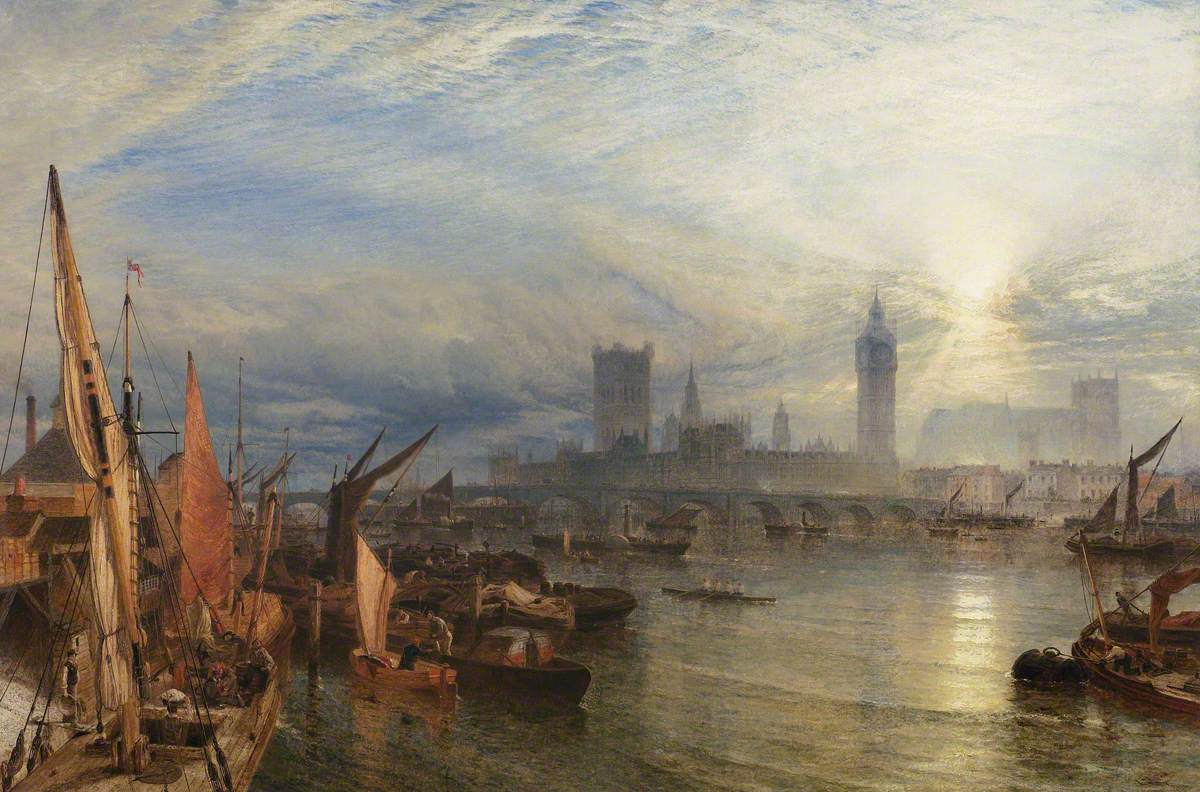
The New Palace of Westminster, 1857

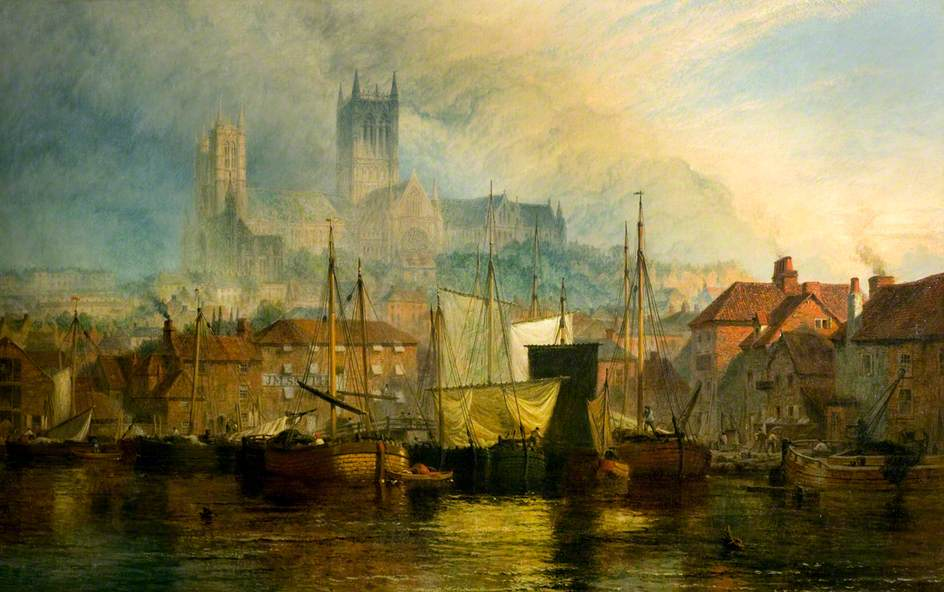
Lincoln Cathedral from Brayford, 1867

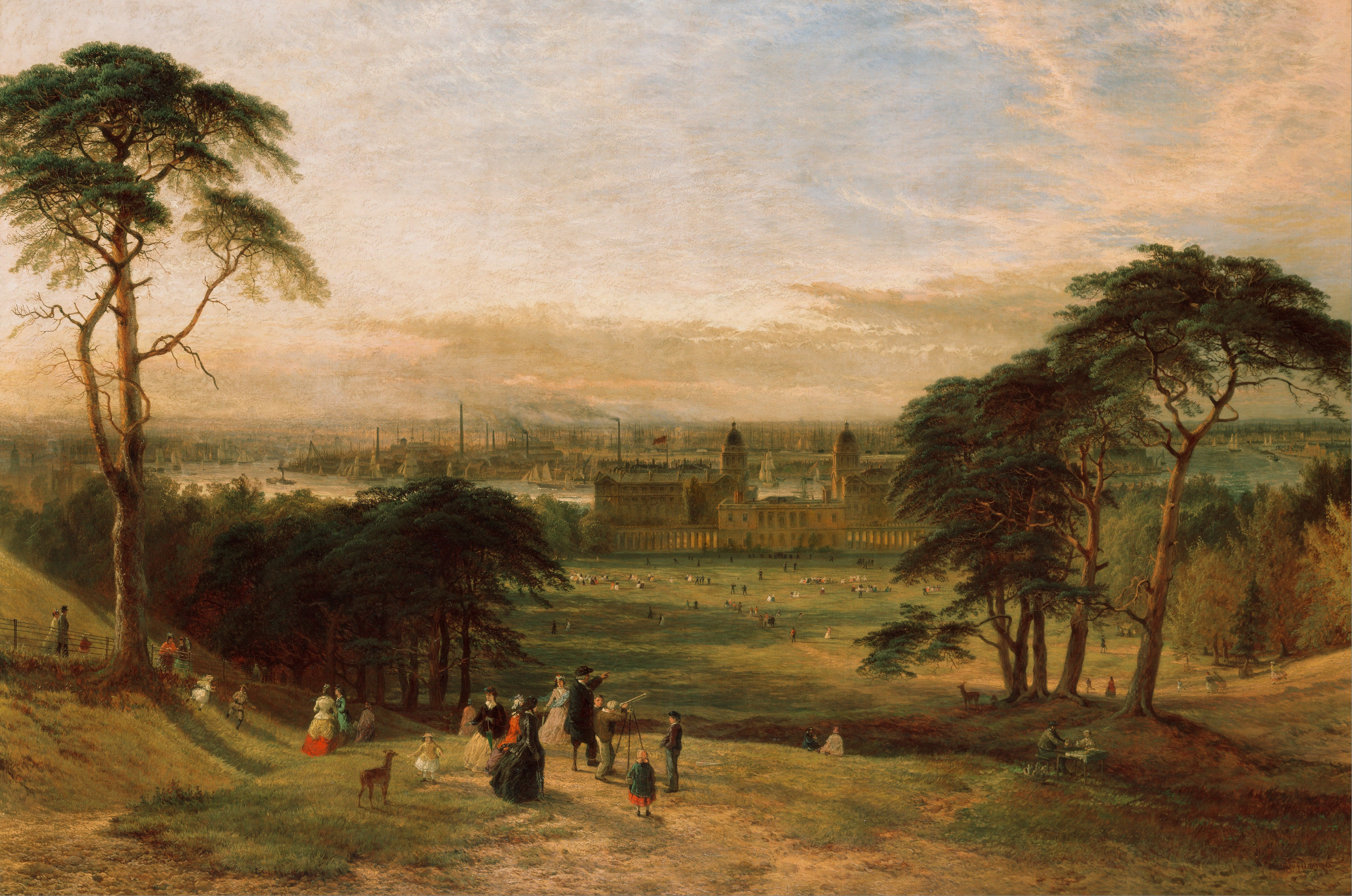
London from Greenwich Hill, 1869

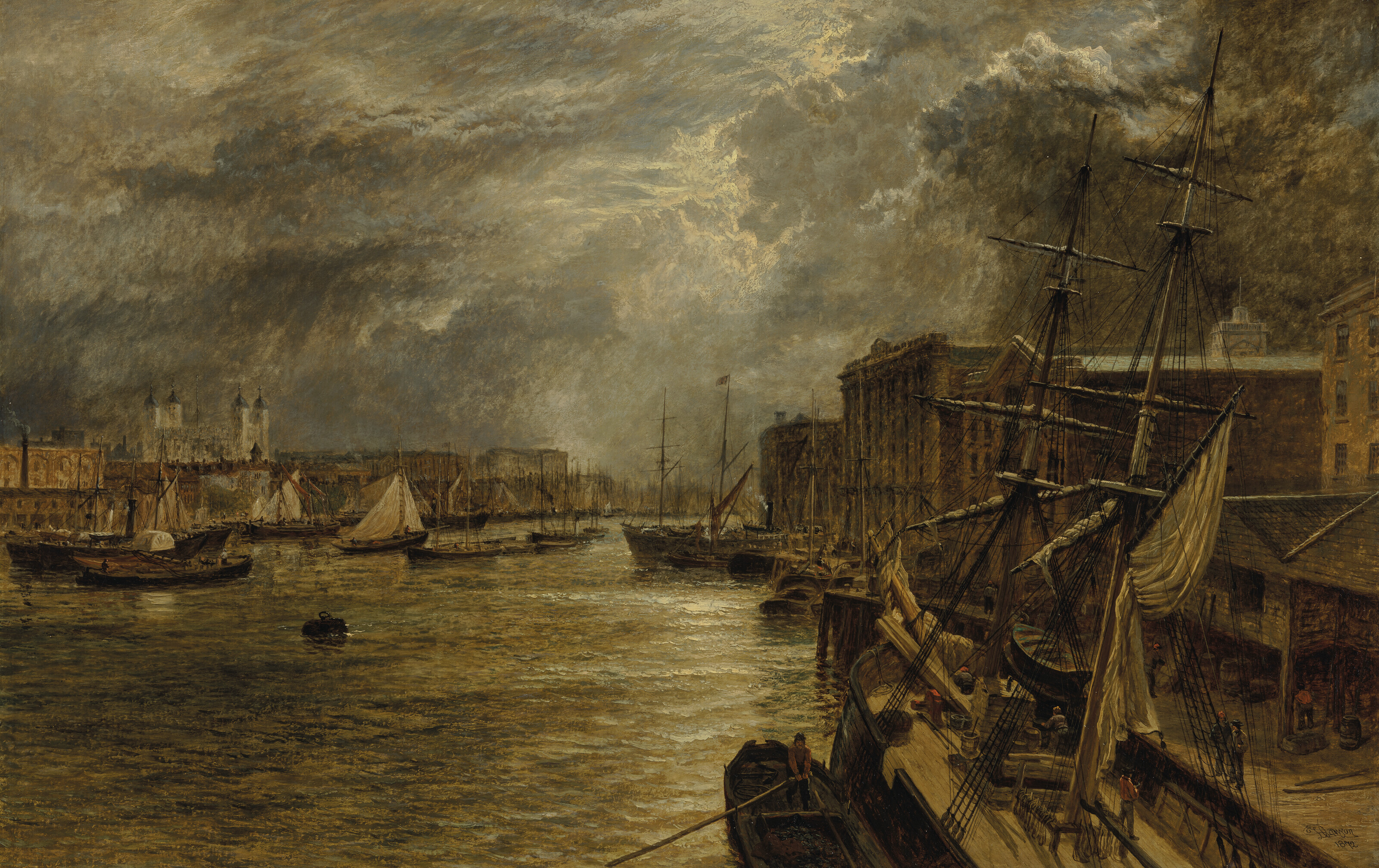
The Tower from London Bridge, 1872
