= Porth Dafarch =

Bay in western Anglesey, Wales

Coordinates: 53.2867°N 4.6521°W

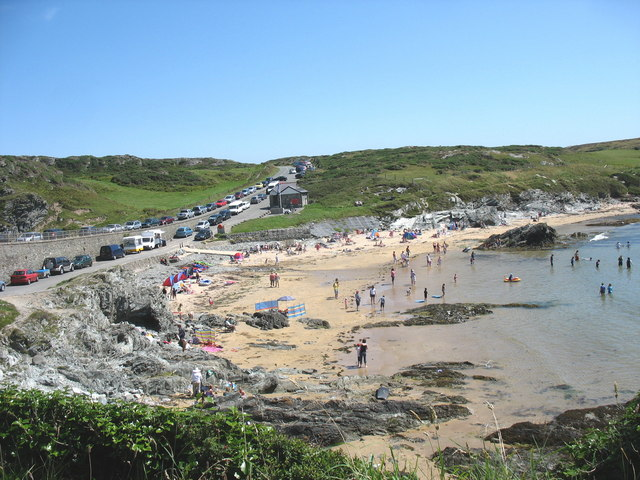
- Beach at Porth Dafarch

- Location within Anglesey
- Community: Holy Island
- Principal area: Anglesey
- Country: Wales
- Sovereign state: United Kingdom
- Police: North Wales
- Fire: North Wales
- Ambulance: Welsh

Porth Dafarch is a small bay on the west coast of Anglesey in North Wales. The inlet is on the west side of Holy Island, Anglesey about 2 mi (3.2 km) southwest of Holyhead and 1.5 mi (2.4 km) northwest of Trearddur Bay. It has a sandy beach and is a popular visitor destination. In 2021 Porth Dafarch beach awarded as Blue Flag beach.

== Toponym ==
The origin of the Welsh name is uncertain: although some claim that the placename is a contraction of Porth Dau Farch ("Harbour of the Two Stallions"), scholars are fairly sure that this is not the case. Indeed, in documents the name has been recorded as Porth Davagh ("Davagh's Harbour") (1545), Porth Daverch (1878), Porth y Dafarch (1799), Porth y Daferch (1789), and the present Porth Dafarch (since 1838). It has been tentatively suggested that "Tafarch" (which takes a soft mutation after porth to become "Dafarch") was a personal name, albeit not a common one.

== Geology ==
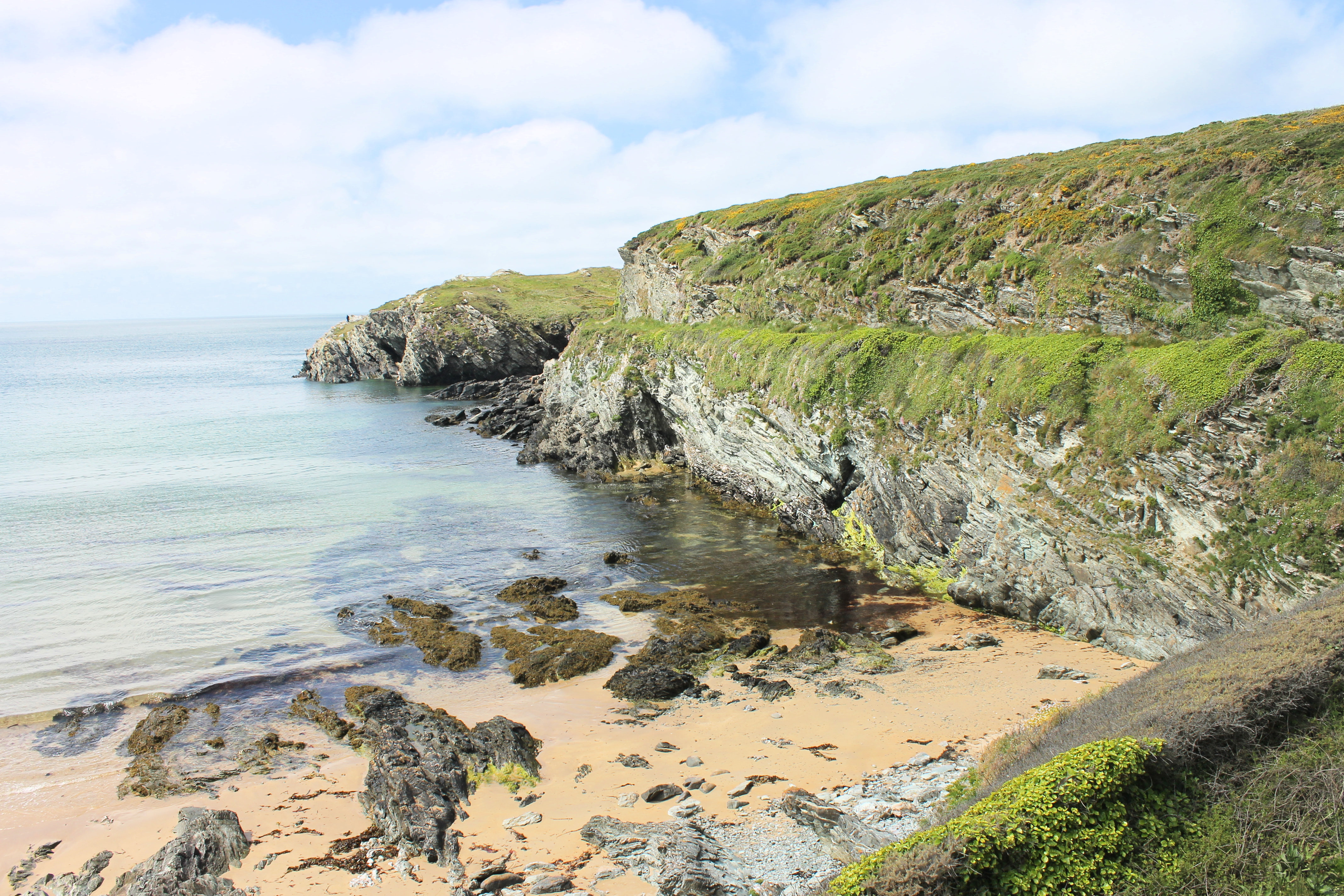
Meta-sedimentary rock forms the bay of Porth Dafarch

The bay, which is roughly 100 metres across, is formed from Cambrian meta-sedimentary rock that includes meta-sandstones, siltstones, and quartzites that have been eroded into sea cliffs and sea caves. As part of Holy Island, Anglesey, the bay is located at the southeastern part of the South Stack Formation, which is a sequence of Cambro-Ordovician (Furongian to Tremadocian) metasedimentary rocks exposed in northwestern Anglesey, North Wales. This is part of a larger geological feature known as the Monian Supergroup.

Erosion has opened the bay southwest into the Irish Sea.

== History ==
Porth Dafarch was used from the mid-17th to early-19th century as an alternative to the main port of Holyhead when it was affected by adverse weather conditions in the Irish Sea. Passengers would use the sheltered bay to set sail for Dublin in Ireland. However, with the commencement of a steam service in 1822 (and the construction of the Holyhead Breakwater), Porth Dafarch was no longer required as an alternative port. The old customs post can still be seen, dating from 1819. It allowed mail and passengers to be landed on Holyhead Island when Northerly winds made landing at Holyhead impossible. By 1873, the new harbour was completed at Holyhead making the customs post redundant. The Grade II listed building is fenced off from public access due to its poor condition.

The bay is a popular visitor destination because of its sandy beach and the opportunity for rock-pooling. It is also popular for watersports, particularly windsurfing, surfing, canoeing, sailing and jet skiing. Scuba divers are able to view the Missouri, a 3000-ton vessel that was wrecked in 1886 on its way to Boston. The bay is in close proximity to campsites and the Anglesey Coastal Path.

A marine fibre-optic cable that links Ireland to the UK makes landfall at Porth Dafarch. The CeltixConnect, which consists of 72 fibre pairs, was laid over a period of about 30 days between mid-December 2011 and mid-January 2012.
