= Anglesey Coastal Path =

124-mile footpath around Anglesey, Wales

Isle of Anglesey Coastal Path Llwybr Arfordirol Ynys Môn (Welsh)
- Waymark and logo
- Length: 200 km (120 mi)
- Location: Anglesey, Wales
- Trailheads: Circular from St Cybi's Church, Holyhead
- Use: Hiking
- Elevation gain/loss: 4,174 m (13,694 ft)
- Highest point: Holyhead Mountain, 163 m (535 ft)
- Sights: Holy Island
- Website: sites.google.com/site/friendsofangleseycoastalpath

The Anglesey Coastal Path (formally the Isle of Anglesey Coastal Path, Welsh: Llwybr Arfordirol Ynys Môn) is a 200-kilometre (124 mi) long-distance footpath around the islands of Anglesey (Welsh: Ynys Môn) and Holy Island (Welsh: Ynys Gybi) in North Wales. The route is part of the Wales Coast Path.

== Description ==
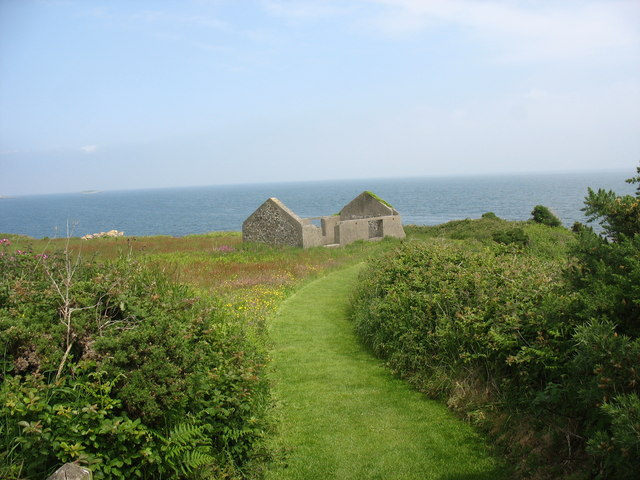
The coastal path and a ruined cottage at Penrhyn, near Traeth Bychan beach

The 200-kilometre (124 mi) path mainly follows the coast. Exceptions are where the path comes inland from Moel y Don by Plas Newydd estate, and the Bodorgan Estate on the west of the island between Aberffraw and Malltraeth, where the Prince and Princess of Wales used to live. The loop officially begins and ends at Holyhead, and is described in the official guidebook in an anti-clockwise direction. It cost £1.4 million and runs virtually within the length of the entire Area of Outstanding Natural Beauty, using the existing network of public rights of way and some designated permissive paths. For example, the coastal path at Mynachdy is closed between mid-September and mid-February. There are alternatives to these permissive paths. The path is well signposted throughout. It has been walked in as little as four days, but around 7–10 days is a guideline for most walkers aiming to complete the whole path.

European Objective 1 funds have contributed to this project, which aims to meet the perceived growing demand for coastal walking. The path has been created by a partnership led by community agency Menter Môn and the Isle of Anglesey County Council. It was formally opened by Rhodri Morgan AM, the former First Minister of Wales, on 9 June 2006.

The Anglesey Coastal Path forms part of the Wales Coast Path, a 1,400-kilometre (870 mi) long-distance walking route around the whole coast of Wales from Chepstow to Queensferry, officially opened in May 2012.

The trail logo depicts a Sandwich tern, of which there is a large colony at Cemlyn Bay.

== Offshoot trails ==
There are a number of smaller trails very near the coast path, which often take users inland on shorter routes: these include:

1. Copper Coast circular walk – starts and finishes at Amlwch Port (SH452936) and passes Point Lynas headland and Parys Mountain. It is a lengthy 22 km (14 mi) walk and should take some 6 hours to complete.
2. Ynys Llanddwyn – over some of the best sands in Anglesey, starting from the car park at SH415649, and is around 2.3 km (1.4 mi) long. The island forms part of the national nature reserve of Newborough Warren which includes the extensive and floristically rich sand dune system. Ynys Llanddwyn is a tidal island and walkers should beware the incoming tide.

== Other places on the path ==
Starting at Holyhead and walking anti-clockwise, the path passes through or near:

- The port of Holyhead, Anglesey's largest town
- South Stack lighthouse and bird observatory
- Porth Dafarch
- Trearddur
- Rhoscolyn
- Rhosneigr
- Barclodiad y Gawres Neolithic burial chamber
- The island church at Llangwyfan
- Aberffraw
- Llangadwaladr church, burial place of Cadfan ap Iago
- Ynys Llanddwyn
- Llanidan, birthplace of Thomas Williams
- Britannia Bridge
- Swellies
- Church Island
- Thomas Telford's Menai Suspension Bridge
- Menai Bridge
- Llandegfan
- Beaumaris
- Penmon and Puffin Island
- Traeth Coch (Red Wharf Bay)
- Benllech
- Moelfre
- The memorial to the wreck of the Royal Charter
- Dulas Bay
- Amlwch
- Bull Bay
- Llanbadrig church
- Cemaes
- Wylfa Nuclear Power Station
- Cemlyn Bay and lagoon
- Carmel Head
- Church Bay/Porth Swtan
- Llanfachraeth
- Llanynghenedl
- Stanley Embankment (like the Menai Suspension Bridge, built by Thomas Telford)
- Penrhos Country Park
- Holyhead
