= Beddmanarch–Cymyran =

Protected area of Anglesey, Wales

- Site of Special Scientific Interest
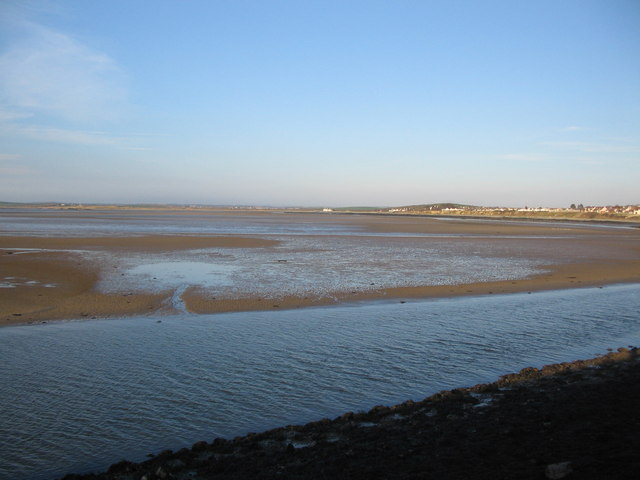
- Low tide at Traeth y Gribin

- Location within Anglesey
- Location of Beddmanarch–Cymyran.
- Area of search: West Gwynedd
- Grid reference: SH 275 790
- Coordinates: 53.28345°N 4.5879°W
- Interest: Biological
- Area: 911 hectares (2,250 acres)
- Notification date: 1961

Beddmanarch–Cymyran is a site of special scientific interest (SSSI) on the Welsh island of Anglesey extending to just over 900 hectares (2,200 acres), and centred on the Cymyran Strait. It was first notified in 1961 for its coastal botanical and ornithological interest. The site is also a marine protected area as it includes intertidal areas and contains marine components.

== Area ==
The Beddmanarch–Cymyran site comprises the area of coastal salt-marshes, mud-flats and shallow coastal water lying between Holy Island and the mainland of Anglesey. This includes the Cymyran Strait (sometimes called the Holy Island Strait), the tidal reaches of the Afon Alaw to the east and extends northwards to Porth Penrhyn-Mawr. There are two crossings over the water that makes up the site, Four Mile Bridge (road and pedestrian) and the Stanley Embankment (road, rail and pedestrian). The area between the two bridges is known as the Inland Sea.

== Importance ==
The site includes four special areas of interest:

- Marine biology; especially all three British species of eelgrass (Zostera)
- Salt marsh vegetation; glasswort, common saltmarsh-grass, thrift, lax-flowered sea-lavender, sea rush and the uncommon golden samphire (Inula crithmoides)
- Coastal dune heath; heather with sand wedge present at both Traeth y Gribin and at Cymyran
- Overwintering water birds; including ringed plover, curlew, greenshank, red-breasted merganser, goldeneye, and brent geese

More generally, the area is also important for a mixture of environments including mudflats and sandbanks, tidally swept areas of bedrock, rock outcrops, shingle bars, muddy gravels, and coastal grassland and scrub. All of these support a variety of wildlife including breeding birds, such as arctic and common terns, and plants like dwarf rush (Juncus capitatus) and spiral tasselweed (Ruppia cirrhosa).

As a marine protected area the site is important for the common ringed plover (Charadrius hiaticula), common greenshank (Tringa nebularia), eel grass and tide-swept algae, and for its inter-tidal, salt marsh, muddy gravel, and sheltered mud environments.

The wintering populations of the ringed plover and greenshank are monitored by the RSPB.

== Risks ==
While many activities can damage protected sites, Beddmanarch–Cymyran SSSI is sensitive to a number of possible changes and activities:

- Changes to the tidal regime, for example, changes to the opening of channels would affect the unique environment of the Inland Sea which often provides areas of mudflat available to birds when it is high tide elsewhere.
- The low levels of suspended sediment encourage eelgrass.
- Light grazing of the coastal heath encourages heather. Paths and tracks provide bare ground for dwarf rush germination.
- Low levels of nutrients in the dune soils are important for the eelgrass beds. Pollution from fertilizers and supplementary feeding raises nutrient levels which encourage coarse grasses and mat forming seaweed to the detriment of other species.
- Beach recreation can disturb nesting ringed plover wintering water-birds and nesting terns.
- Disturbance from shooting may deny feeding opportunities to wintering populations of waders and wildfowl. Controlled shooting occurs but there are agreed sanctuary zones.
- Invasive species such as wireweed (Sargassum muticum), an alien seaweed, sometimes appear in the site, and their presence and effects are monitored.
- Bait digging can affect the muddy gravel environments, but filling in pits and replacing boulders, as suggested by the Conservation Code for Anglers, reduces the problem.

== Management ==
A wide variety of operations may affect the site and require consultation with Natural Resources Wales and may further require consent. 28 operations are currently listed and include activities relating to farming, fishing, water utilisation, and the introduction or removal of flora and fauna. The list is not prohibitive, but many activities may be limited to certain areas or times of the year.
