= Holyhead Breakwater =

Longest breakwater in the United Kingdom

Coordinates: 53.325°N 4.63°W

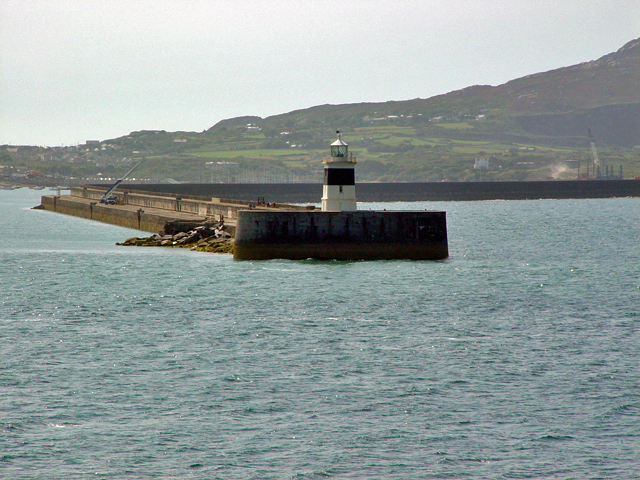
Holyhead Breakwater and Lighthouse.

Holyhead Breakwater is situated at the north-western end of Holyhead in Anglesey in Wales. The Victorian structure, which is 1.71 miles (2.75 km) long, is the longest breakwater in the United Kingdom. The breakwater, which is accessible in good weather, has a promenade on top which leads out to the Holyhead Breakwater Lighthouse. It is a Grade II* listed structure.

== Background ==
In the age of sail, northerly winds in the Irish Sea could often prevent ships from Ireland entering the old harbour at Holyhead. When adverse weather conditions halted sailings from Holyhead, passengers and cargo had to be moved to Porth Dafarch on the southerly side of Holy Island. The sheltered bay was used from the mid-17th into the 19th century as an alternative to the main port. The customs post, dating from 1819, can still be seen at Porth Dafarch.

The Acts of Union 1800 that united the Parliament of Great Britain with the Parliament of Ireland necessitated immediate improvements to the old harbour to improve the links between Dublin and London. Construction included the Admiralty Pier (built 1810-24) by John Rennie and the South Pier (built 1823-31) and graving dock designed by Thomas Telford; his London-Holyhead Road, which included the Menai Suspension Bridge and Stanley Embankment, ended at Admiralty Arch on Salt Island in Holyhead. Despite transport improvements on the mainland, the old harbour remained congested with marine traffic. The heavily-used Admiralty Pier (for the mail and Packet trade) at the northern end of the old harbour (and attached to Salt Island) often took the brunt of bad weather which required frequent repairs and dredging.

By the mid 19th century railway mania had created a transport revolution in Great Britain. Poor weather delaying sailings from Holyhead was no longer acceptable because of the number of passengers and cargo crossing between Ireland and Great Britain. Holyhead needed a large area of calm water with safe anchorages for the number of vessels now using the port. In 1847, the New Harbour was authorised by the Holyhead Harbour Act 1847 (10 & 11 Vict. c. 76) which allowed more than 400 acres (160 ha) of deep water to be enclosed by a stone breakwater in order to create a sheltered roadstead in addition to Holyhead's pre-existing 276 acres (112 ha) old harbour. With the opening of the Chester and Holyhead Railway in August 1848 on Anglesey, there was an immediate imperative to begin construction.

== Construction ==
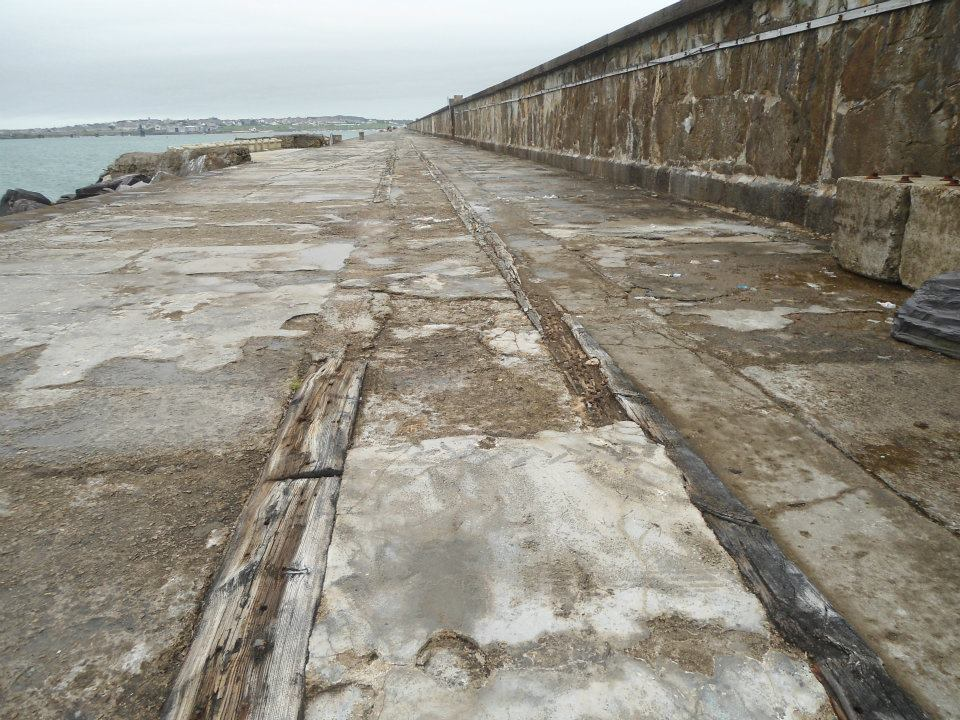
Remains of the breakwater railway.

In January 1848 work began under the auspices of superintendent engineer J. M. Rendel. Following his death in 1856, the project was completed by John Hawkshaw. Shaped 10-tonne blocks of limestone were used to create an outer facing wall, thereby encasing a rubble mound raised from the sea both by dumping from ships and tipping from the shore. Divers in submarine bells created the level foundations on which the tiers of facing stones were placed. These men worked underwater using picks and hammers, and carried out blasting using gunpowder sealed in watertight tin pipes. Up to 1,300 men were employed during the work; 40 died during construction. After taking 28 years to complete, Holyhead's breakwater was officially opened on 19 August 1873 by Albert Edward, Prince of Wales.

A broad gauge railway was used to carry more than seven million tonnes of stone from the quarries on Holyhead Mountain to the working areas. The line eventually reached 1.48 mi (2.38 km) in length. In 1913 it was finally converted to standard gauge when a new engine was required, as the mid-1800s original had worn out. A locomotive with a plate inscribed "J. & C. Rigby, Holyhead Harbour Works, 1861" worked on the 7 ft 0¼ in Ponta Delgada harbour railway until 1973. After a further transition to diesel traction (using the British Rail Class 01, the lightest standard-gauge shunters ever used on the British railways), the line continued in service for breakwater maintenance purposes until the 1980s when it finally ceased operations and maintenance duties were taken over by various road and all-terrain vehicles.

Since November 2014, concrete blocks have been placed at the entrance to block traffic. However, the breakwater is still accessible to walkers.

== Gallery ==
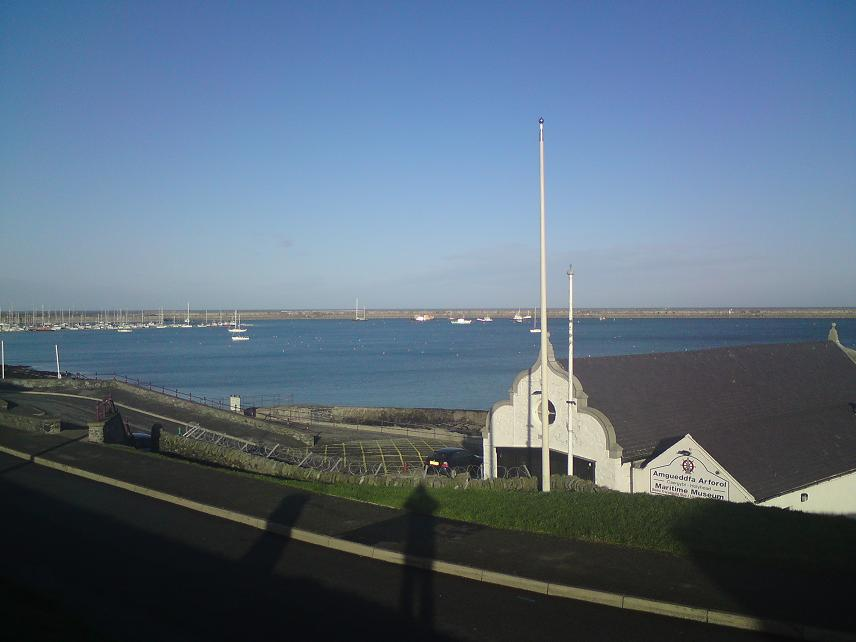
The breakwater in the distance over the harbour.

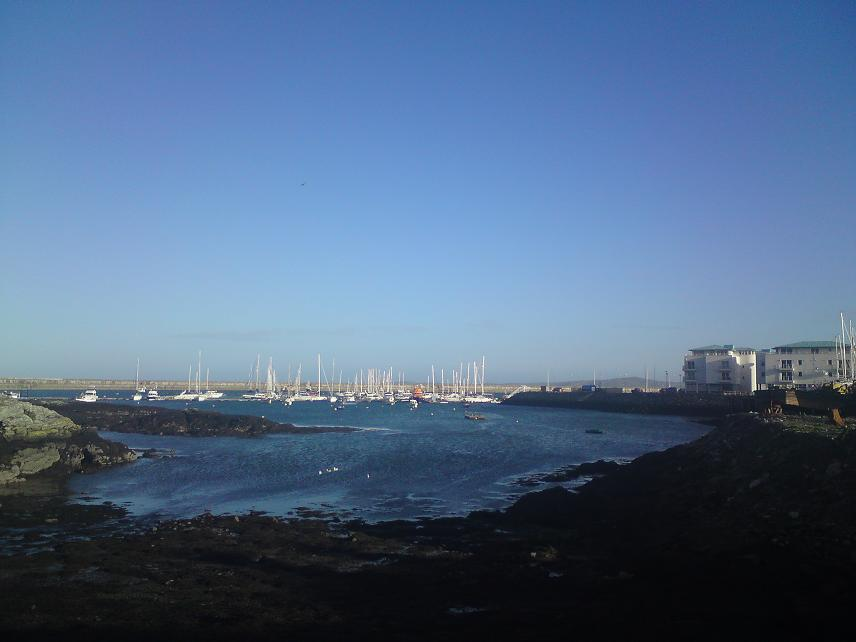
The breakwater encompassing Holyhead Marina.

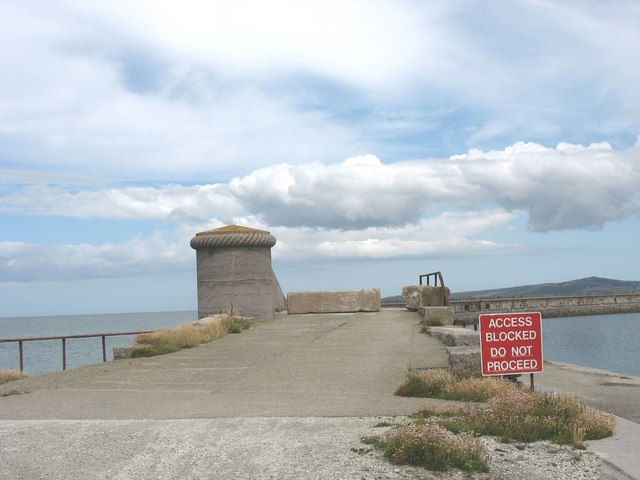
Entrance to the breakwater.

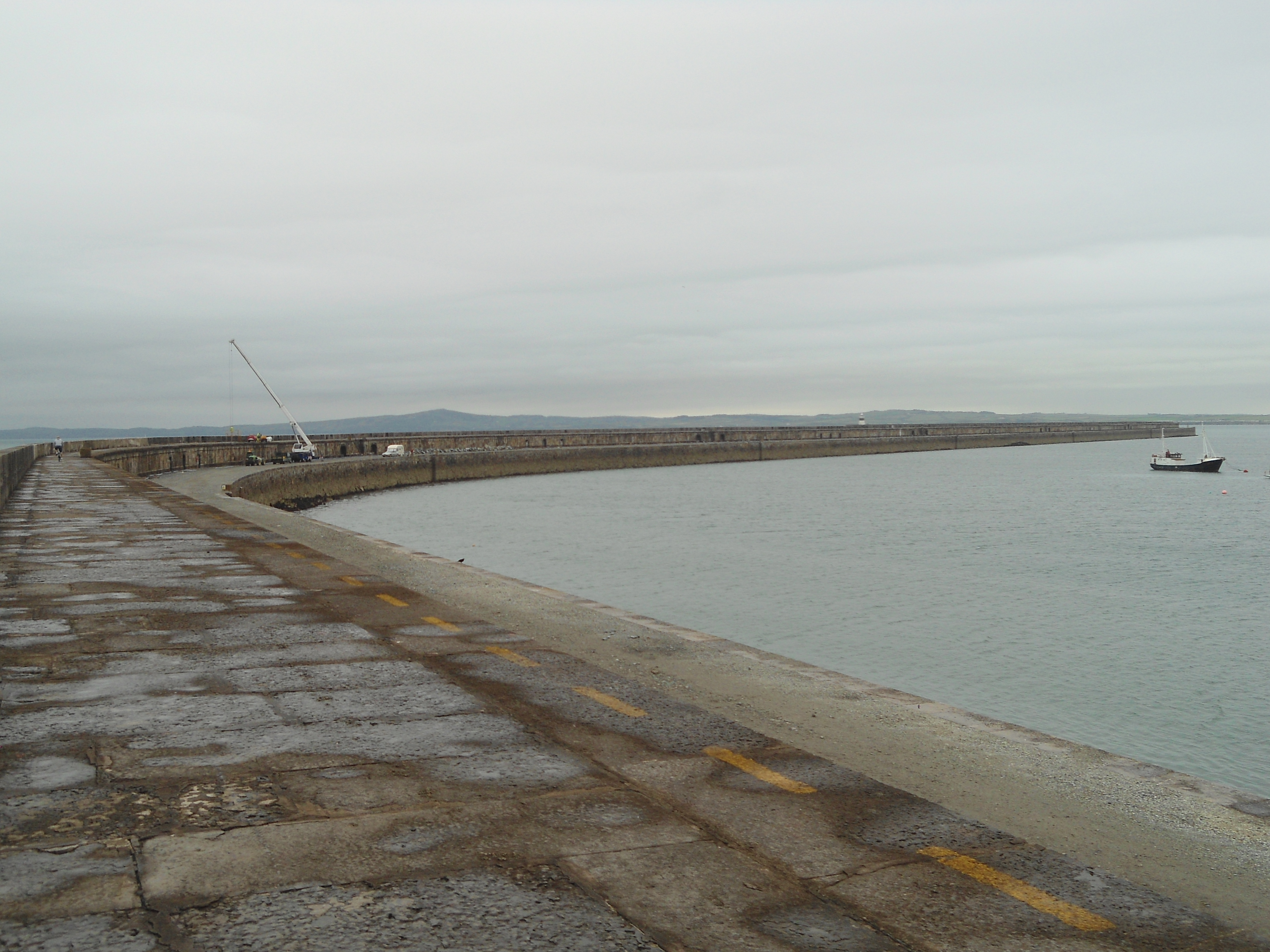
The breakwater seaward from the land end.

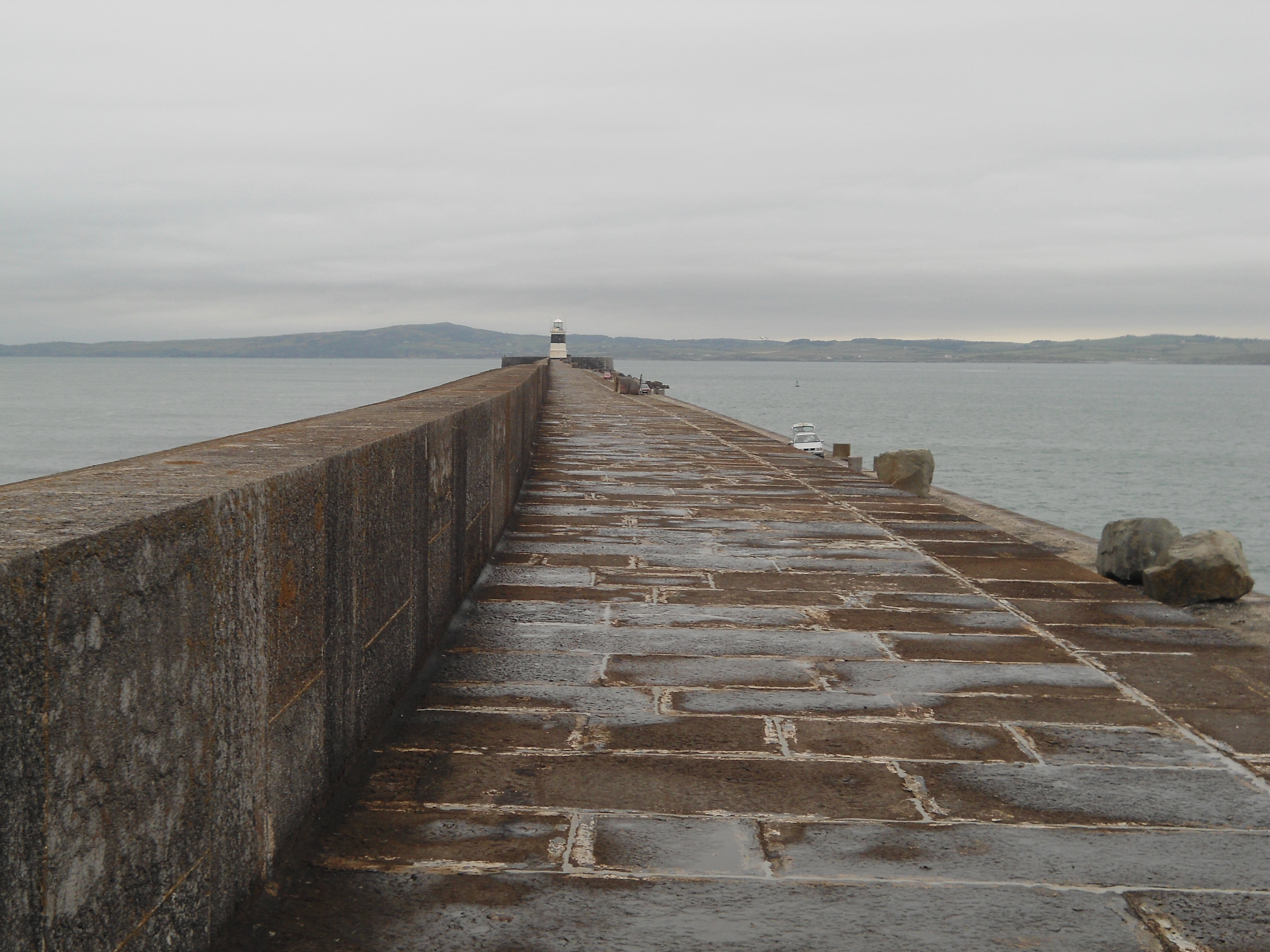
End of the breakwater and lighthouse.

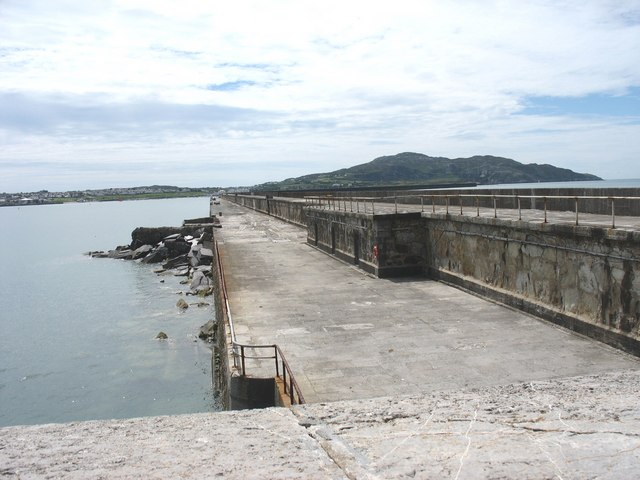
Lower level carried the breakwater railway.

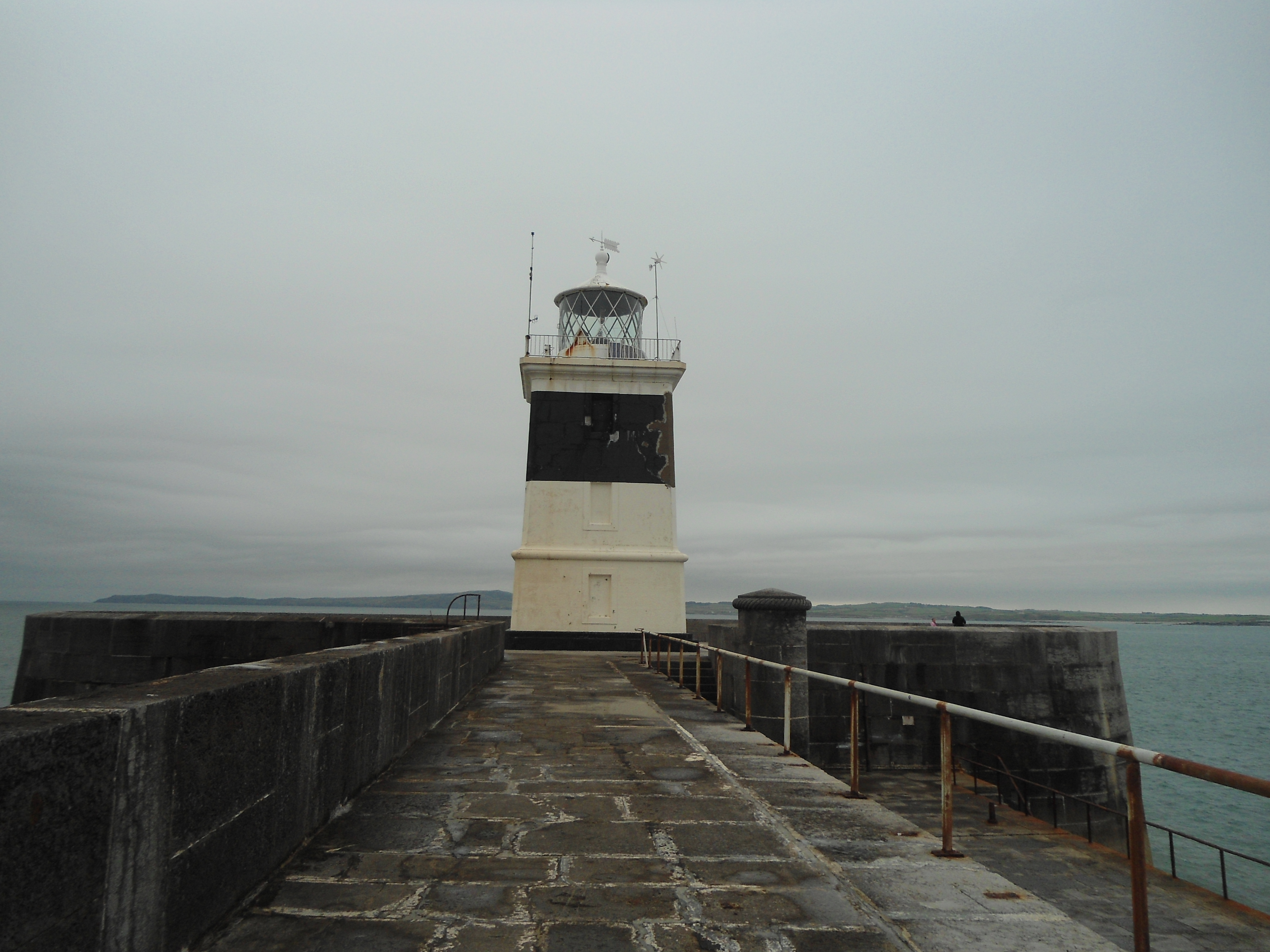
The lighthouse.

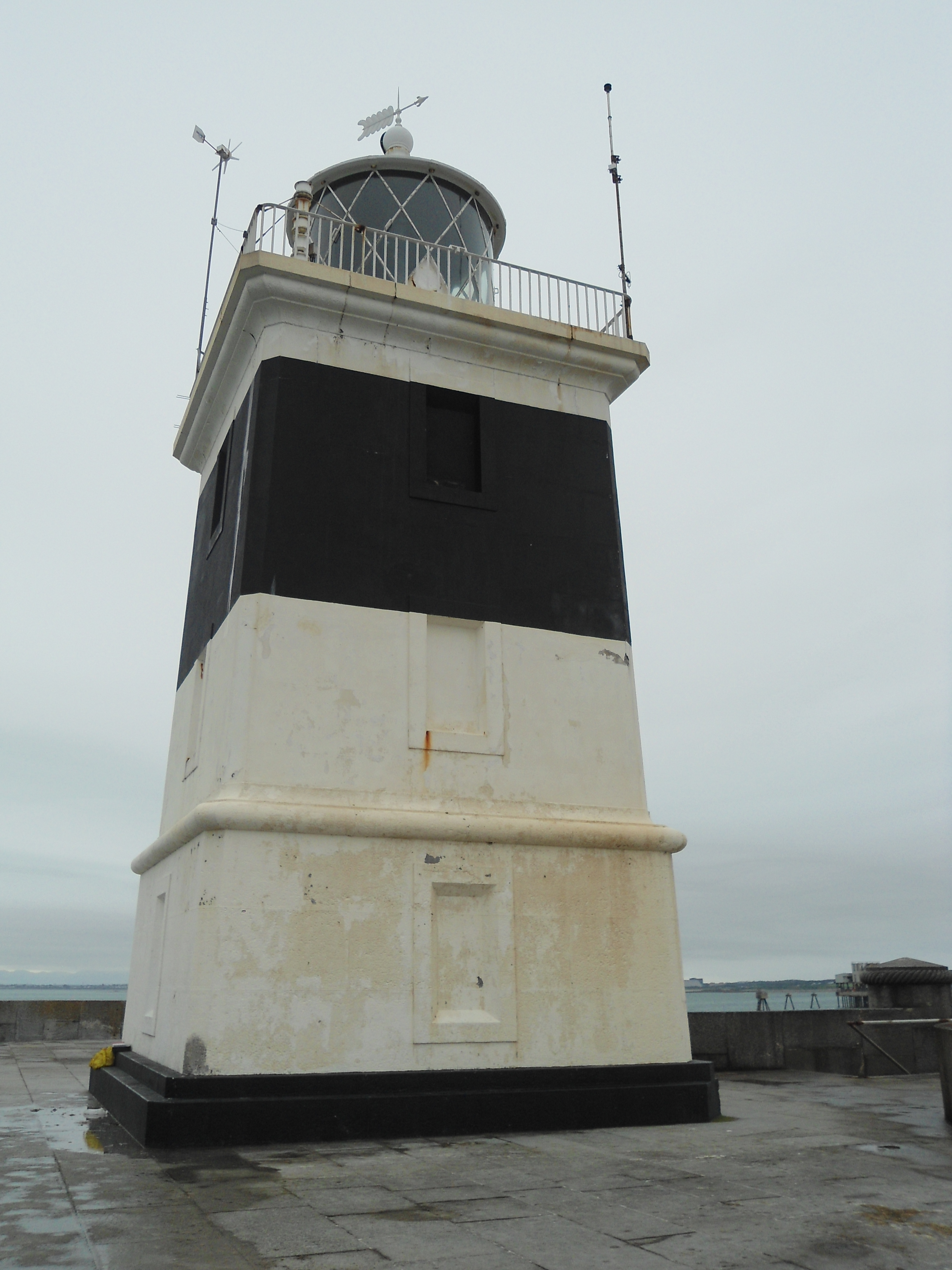
The light was fully automated in 1961.
