= Embankment (earthworks) =

Wall or bank to carry a road or rail over low ground or water's edge

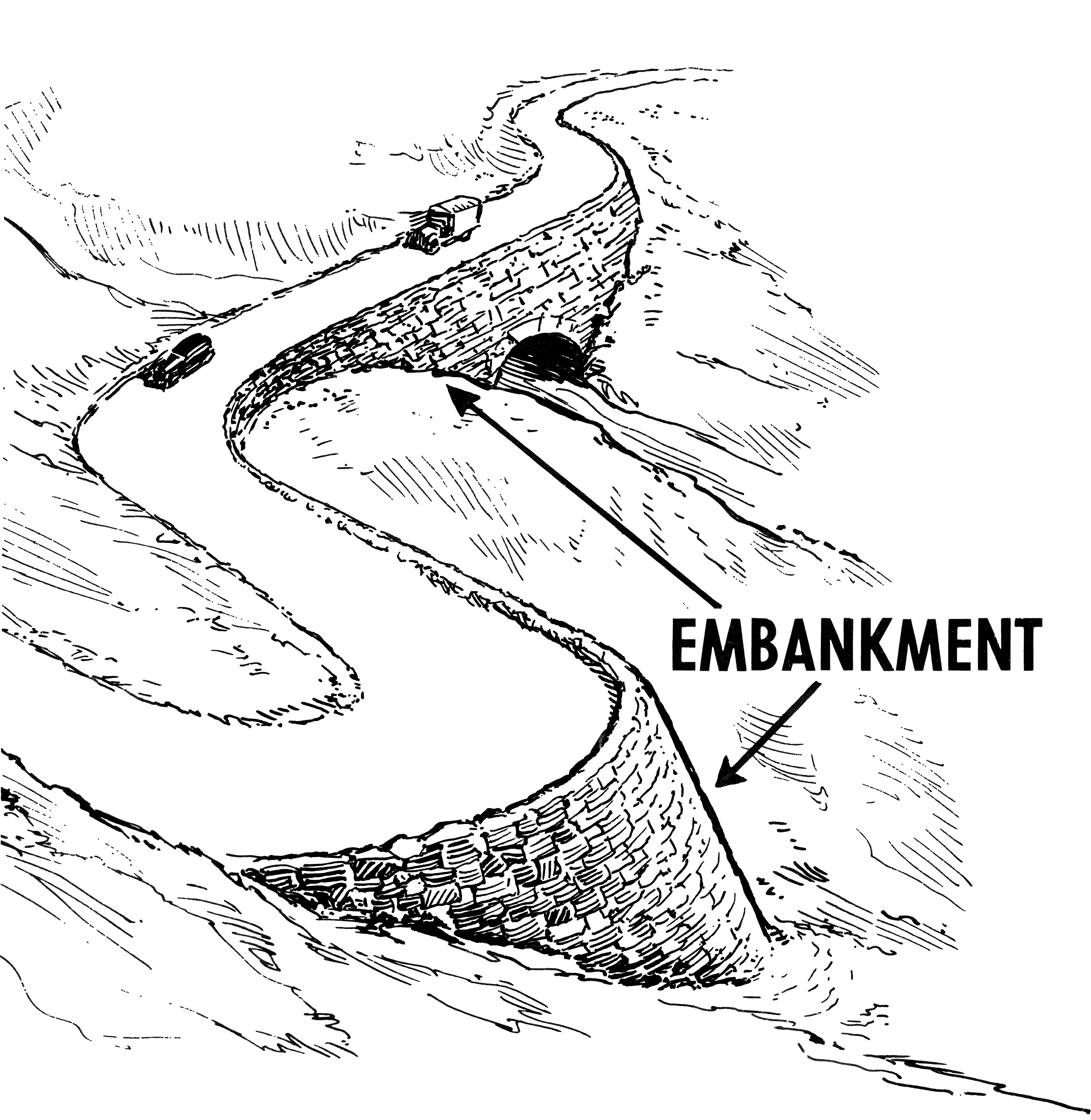
A diagram showing an embankment

Embankment on Kalvebod Fælled, Copenhagen

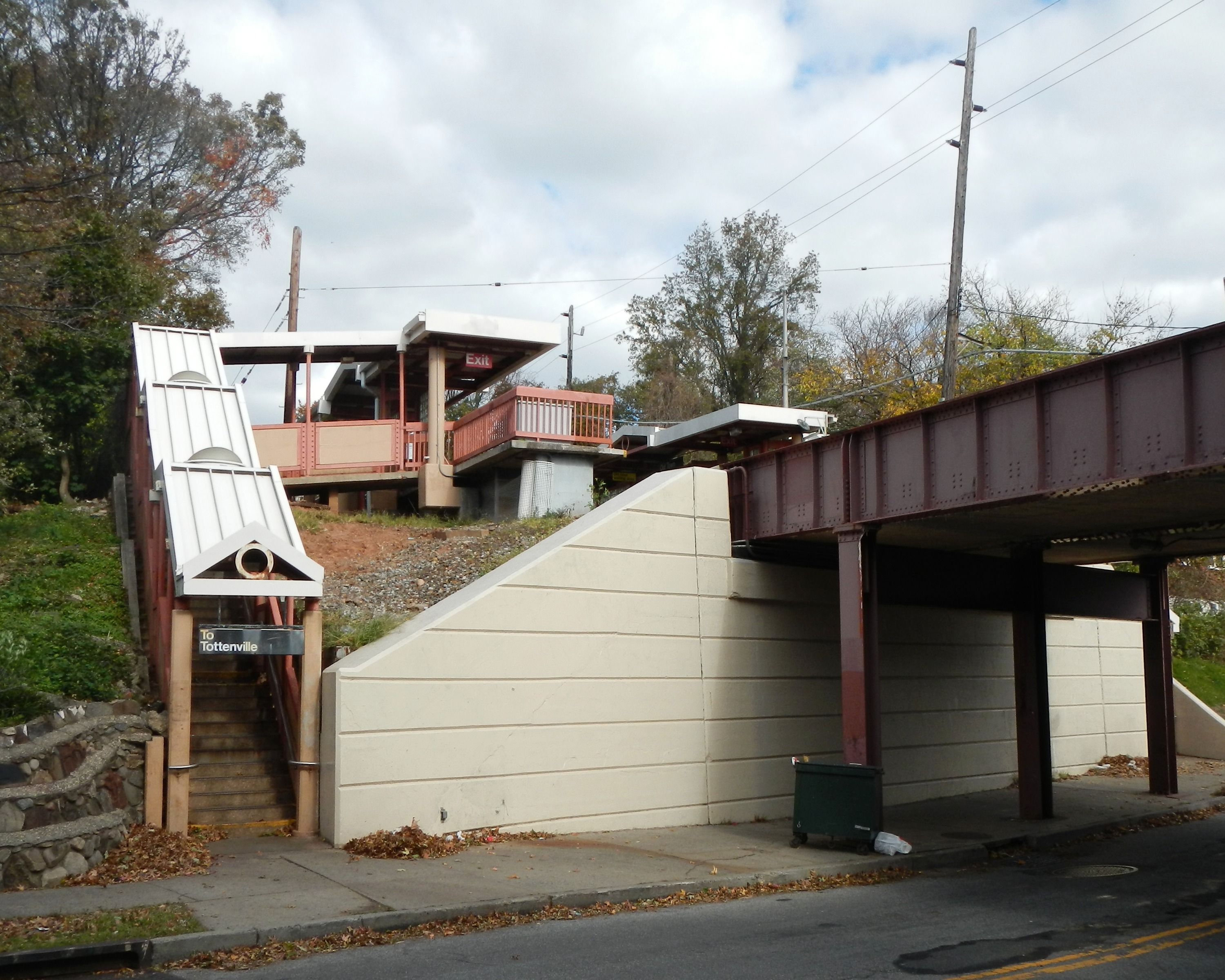
Cream-colored concrete abutment marks a gap in an embankment and gives vertical support to the dark red trestle bridge, and to the fill of the bridge approach embankment. To reduce the metal cost of the bridge here it is further supported by erecting metal piers.

An embankment is a raised wall, bank, or mound that is made of earth or stone and used to hold back water or carry a roadway. A road, railway track, or aqueduct is normally raised onto an embankment made of compacted soil (typically clay or rock-based) to avoid a change in level required by the terrain, the alternatives being either to have an unacceptable change in level or detour to follow a contour. A cutting is used for the same purpose where the land is originally higher than required.

== Materials ==
Embankments are often constructed using material obtained from a cutting. Embankments need to be constructed using non-aerated and waterproofed, compacted (or entirely non-porous) material to provide adequate support to the formation and a long-term level surface with stability. An example material for road embankment building is sand-bentonite mixture often used as a protective to protect underground utility cables and pipelines.

== Intersection of embankments ==
To intersect an embankment without a high flyover, a series of tunnels can consist of a section of high tensile strength viaduct (typically built of brick and/or metal) or pair of facing abutments for a bridge.

== Notable embankments ==
- Burnley Embankment: The largest canal embankment in Britain.
- Harsimus Stem Embankment: The remains of a railway built by the Pennsylvania Railroad in Jersey City, New Jersey, United States
- Stanley Embankment: A railway, road and cycleway that connects the Island of Anglesey and Holy Island, Wales. It carries the North Wales Coast Line and the A5 road.

== See also ==
- Causeway
- Cut and fill
- Cut (earthmoving)
- Fill dirt
- Grade (slope)
- Land reclamation
- Levee
- Roadbed
- Track bed
- Retaining wall
