= List of shipwrecks in July 1856 =

The list of shipwrecks in July 1856 includes ships sunk, foundered, grounded, or otherwise lost during July 1856.

== 1 July ==
List of shipwrecks: 1 July 1856
Ship	State	Description
Auguste	Norway	The barque was abandoned in the Indian Ocean. She was on a voyage from Rangoon, Burma to Liverpool, Lancashire, United Kingdom.

== 2 July ==
List of shipwrecks: 2 July 1856
Ship	State	Description
Dane	United Kingdom	The ship was wrecked at Narva, Russia.
Isabella	United Kingdom	The ship was driven ashore near Narva. She was on a voyage from Liverpool, Lancashire to Narva.
Robert Peel	United Kingdom	The ship was driven ashore near Narva. She was on a voyage from Terschelling, Friesland, Netherlands to Narva.
Rugia Underborg	Stralsund	The ship was driven ashore 2 nautical miles (3.7 km) south of Helsingør, Denmark. She was on a voyage from Liverpool to Stralsund. She was refloated the next day and resumed her voyage.
Sieke van der Westland	Netherlands	The ship was driven ashore near Narva.
William Wilberforce	United Kingdom	The full-rigged ship foundered in the Atlantic Ocean off Cabo da Roca, Portugal. Some of her crew were rescued by the steamship Douro (United Kingdom.

== 3 July ==
List of shipwrecks: 3 July 1856
Ship	State	Description
Adams	United Kingdom	The ship departed from Bombay, India for London. No further trace, presumed foundered with the loss of all hands.
Grand Turk	United States	The steamboat was destroyed by fire at Saint Louis.
J. M. Stockwell	United States	The steamboat was destroyed by fire at Saint Louis.
Paul Anderson	United States	The steamboat was destroyed by fire at Saint Louis.
Kate Bowley	United Kingdom	The schooner was abandoned in the Atlantic Ocean. All on board were rescued by Emeu (France). Kate Bowley was on a voyage from Prince Edward Island, British North America to London.
Marchioness of Queensbury	United Kingdom	The ship was driven ashore and wrecked at Bic, Province of Canada, British North America. She was on a voyage from Quebec City, Province of Canada to Hull, Yorkshire. She was refloated on 17 September and towed back to Quebec City.
Saranac	United States	The steamboat was destroyed by fire at Saint Louis.
Southerner	United States	The steamboat was destroyed by fire at Saint Louis.
St. Clair	United States	The steamboat was destroyed by fire at Saint Louis.
Triune	United Kingdom	The smack departed from Liverpool, Lancashire for Ballyshannon, County Donegal. No further trace, presumed foundered with the loss of all hands.

== 4 July ==
List of shipwrecks: 4 July 1856
Ship	State	Description
Countess of Elgin	United Kingdom	The ship ran aground on a reef off Point Palermas, India. She was on a voyage from Calcutta, India to London. She was refloated and put back to Calcutta in a leaky condition.

== 5 July ==
List of shipwrecks: 5 July 1856
Ship	State	Description
Camelion	United Kingdom	The ship was driven ashore in the Magdalen Islands, Nova Scotia, British North America with the loss of two of her crew. She was on a voyage from Dalhousie, New Brunswick, British North America to the Isle of Man.
Jane	United Kingdom	The full-rigged ship was driven ashore on Brier Island, Nova Scotia and was abandoned by her crew. She was on a voyage from Belfast, County Antrim to Quebec City, Province of Canada, British North America. She was declared a total loss.
Rose	United Kingdom	The barque struck an iceberg in the Atlantic Ocean and became waterlogged, remaining afloat on her cargo of timber. Her 21 crew were rescued on 13 July by Victoria (United Kingdom) and the ship was set afire. Rose was on a voyage from Quebec City to Plymouth, Devon.
Spartan	United Kingdom	The steamship was wrecked on the Cane Rocks, off the coast of the Beylik of Tunis. All on board, her crew and 802 passengers, were rescued by the steamship Sphinx (France). Spartan was on a voyage from Balaklava, Russia to an English port.
Teazer	United Kingdom	The schooner was wrecked off "Tradetown", Africa. Her crew were rescued.

== 6 July ==
List of shipwrecks: 6 July 1856
Ship	State	Description
Mail	United Kingdom	The steamship was run into by the steamship Excelsior (United Kingdom) and was severely damaged in the River Mersey off the Black Rock Lighthouse, Cheshire with the loss of eight lives. Mail was on a voyage from Dublin to Liverpool, Lancashire; she was taken in to Liverpool. Excelsior was on her maiden voyage, from Liverpool to Belfast, County Antrim.
Peter Senn	United Kingdom	The barque sprang a leak at Smithville, North Carolina, United States. She was consequently condemned.

== 7 July ==
List of shipwrecks: 7 July 1856
Ship	State	Description
Actaeon	United Kingdom	The schooner was driven ashore in Church Bay, Anglesey with the loss of her captain.
Adelaide	United Kingdom	The schooner was driven ashore and wrecked at Holyhead, Anglesey with the loss of her captain. She was on a voyage from Dublin to Workington, Cumberland.
Africa	United Kingdom	The ship ran aground on the West Hoyle Bank, in Liverpool Bay. She was on a voyage from Bombay, India to Liverpool, Lancashire. She was refloated on 9 July and taken in to Liverpool.
City of Brooklyn	United States	The ship ran aground on the Pluckington Bank, in the River Mersey. She was on a voyage from Liverpool to New York. She was refloated.
Clara	United Kingdom	The smack was driven ashore at Porthdinllaen, Caernarfonshire. She was on a voyage from Barrow-in-Furness, Lancashire to Newport, Monmouthshire.
Diligent	United Kingdom	The schooner was driven ashore and wrecked at Porthdinllaen. She was on a voyage from Shoreham-by-Sea, Sussex to Liverpool.
Eaglet	United Kingdom	The schooner was driven ashore and wrecked between Redcar and Staithes, Yorkshire.
Enterprise	United Kingdom	The schooner was driven ashore at Mockbeggar, Cheshire.
Familie	Denmark	The galeas ran aground in the Fanø Tief. Her crew were rescued. She was on a voyage from Newcastle upon Tyne, Northumberland, United Kingdom to Raaborghuus.
Jane Lovett	United Kingdom	The ship was driven ashore at Newry, County Antrim.
Lively	United Kingdom	The schooner was driven ashore and wrecked between Redcar and Staithes.
Lively	United Kingdom	The smack was driven ashore at Porthdinllaen. She was on a voyage from Liverpool to Pwllheli, Caernarfonshire.
Madryn	United Kingdom	The ship was driven ashore at Porthdinllaen.
Mona	(United Kingdom of Great Britain and Ireland) Isle of Man	The ship ran aground on the North Bank, in Liverpool Bay. She was on a voyage from Liverpool to Dunkirk, Nord, France. She was refloated and beached at the Magazines.
Naval Brigade	United Kingdom	The ship ran aground on the Pluckington Bank. She was on a voyage from Quebec City, Province of Canada, British North America to Liverpool. She was refloated on 2 August and taken in to Liverpool in a waterlogged condition.
Popplewell	United Kingdom	The schooner was driven ashore near Fishguard, Pembrokeshire. Her crew survived. She was on a voyage from Swansea, Glamorgan to Chester, Cheshire or vice versa.
Spring	United Kingdom	The barque was wrecked on the Trow Rocks, near the mouth of the River Tyne. Her crew were rescued.
Surprise	United Kingdom	The schooner was driven ashore near Porthdinllaen. She was on a voyage from Shoreham-by-Sea to Liverpool.
Theodore	United Kingdom	The brigantine was driven ashore at Fishguard. Her crew were rescued by the Fishguard Lifeboat. She was on a voyage from Liverpool to Marseille, Bouches-du-Rhône, France.
Three Brothers	United Kingdom	The ship was driven ashore and wrecked at Porthdinllaen.
Tribune	United Kingdom	The ship was driven ashore on the West Hoyle Bank. She was on a voyage from Liverpool to Callao, Peru. She was refloated on 16 July.

== 8 July ==
List of shipwrecks: 8 July 1856
Ship	State	Description
G. B. Matthews	United Kingdom	The schooner ran aground on the Sand Bore Reef, off Gorps Key and was wrecked. She was on a voyage from New Orleans, Louisiana, United States to Belize City, British Honduras.
Isaac Webb	United States	The full-rigged ship was driven ashore and wrecked at Amlwch, Anglesey, United Kingdom. All on board, more than 320 people, were rescued. She was on a voyage from Liverpool, Lancashire, United Kingdom to New York.
Larissa	United States	The ship ran aground on a reef east of Bermuda. She was on a voyage from Rio de Janeiro, Brazil to New York. She was refloated.

== 9 July ==
List of shipwrecks: 9 July 1856
Ship	State	Description
George A. Hopley	United Kingdom	The ship was driven ashore and wrecked at Portrush, County Down. She was on a voyage from Liverpool, Lancashire to Charleston, South Carolina, United States.

== 10 July ==
List of shipwrecks: 10 July 1856
Ship	State	Description
Asmore	United Kingdom	The ship was driven ashore and wrecked at Porthdinllaen, Caernarfonshire with the loss of three of her crew.

== 12 July ==
List of shipwrecks: 12 July 1856
Ship	State	Description
Goeland	France	The ship was wrecked on the Newcombe Sand, in the North Sea off the coast of Suffolk, United Kingdom. Her crew were rescued by a yawl.

== 13 July ==
List of shipwrecks: 13 July 1856
Ship	State	Description
Brisk	United Kingdom	The barque was wrecked off Grand Bassa, Liberia with the loss of a crew member.
Red Warrior	United States	The ship was destroyed by fire in the Atlantic Ocean 100 nautical miles (190 km) off Cape Sable Island, Nova Scotia, British North America. Her crew were rescued. She was on a voyage from Marseille, Bouches-du-Rhône, France to New York.

== 14 July ==
List of shipwrecks: 14 July 1856
Ship	State	Description
Amelia	United Kingdom	The ship was driven ashoreon Tybee Island, Georgia, United States. She was on a voyage from Cardiff, Glamorgan to Charleston, South Carolina, United States. She was later refloated and taken in to Savannah, Georgia, where she arrived on 21 July.
Clare	United Kingdom	The ship ran aground at Dumfries. She was on a voyage from Quebec City, Province of Canada, British North America to Dumfries.
Samuel Morris	(United Kingdom of Great Britain and Ireland) British North America	The ship was wrecked on Cross Island, Maine, United States. She was on a voyage from Boston, Massachusetts, United States to Saint John, New Brunswick.
Teti	Spain	The brigantine was driven ashore and wrecked between Beachy Head and the Cow Gap, Sussex, United Kingdom. Her crew survived. She was on a voyage from Ålesund, Norway to Barcelona.
Zaayer	Ottoman Empire	The ship foundered in the Mediterranean Sea 80 nautical miles (150 km) west of "Cerego". Her crew were rescued by Bernard (United Kingdom). Zaayer was on a voyage from Galaţi to Falmouth, Cornwall or Queenstown, County Cork, United Kingdom.

== 15 July ==
List of shipwrecks: 15 July 1856
Ship	State	Description
Emily Ann	United Kingdom	The schooner was in collision with the tug Rattler in the River Mersey and was beached at Seacombe, Cheshire.

== 16 July ==
List of shipwrecks: 16 July 1856
Ship	State	Description
Ellen	United Kingdom	The Mersey Flat sank in the River Mersey with the loss of a crew member.
Tinto	(United Kingdom of Great Britain and Ireland) British North America	The steamship was destroyed by fire at Kingston, Province of Canada with the loss of twelve of the 25 people on board. She was on a voyage from Quebec City to Toronto.

== 17 July ==
List of shipwrecks: 17 July 1856
Ship	State	Description
Huron	(United Kingdom of Great Britain and Ireland) British North America	The ship sank in the Saint Lawrence River.
Jeune Eulalie	France	The ship ran aground on the Newcombe Sand, in the North Sea off the coast of Suffolk, United Kingdom. She was on a voyage from Fécamp, Seine-Inférieure to Seaham, County Durham, United Kingdom.
Northern Indiana	United States	The steamship was destroyed by fire in Lake Erie with the loss of 50 lives.
Procymatia	United Kingdom	The ship ran aground off Kingsdown, Kent. She was on a voyage from Newcastle upon Tyne, Northumberland to Rio de Janeiro, Brazil. She was refloated and taken in to The Downs, resuming her voyage on 18 July.
Supply	United Kingdom	The ship ran aground on the Scheelhoek, in the Zuyder Zee. She was on a voyage from Newcastle upon Tyne to Amsterdam, North Holland, Netherlands. She was refloated.

== 18 July ==
List of shipwrecks: 18 July 1856
Ship	State	Description
Earl of Sunderland	United Kingdom	The ship was driven ashore at Blyth, Northumberland. She was on a voyage from Blyth to London.
Elizabeth	United Kingdom	The ship ran aground on the Corton Sand, in the North Sea off the coast of Suffolk. She was on a voyage from Hartlepool, County Durham to Calais, France. She was refloated on 20 July and resumed her voyage.
Newport	United Kingdom	The schooner ran aground on the Bondicar Bush Rock, off the coast of Northumberland. She was on a voyage from Sunderland, County Durham to Montrose, Forfarshire. She was refloated and taken in to Warkworth, Northumberland in a leaky condition.
Vesper	United Kingdom	The ship foundered in the Atlantic Ocean. Her 30 crew took to the boat; they were rescued on 21 July by Stephen Crowell (United States). Vesper was on a voyage from Liverpool, Lancashire to New York, United States.
Zuline	France	The brig foundered in the Atlantic Ocean 30 nautical miles (56 km) off Lisbon, Portugal. Her crew were rescued by the schooner Prince Albert (United Kingdom). Zuline was on a voyage from Havre de Grâce, Seine-Inférieure to Gorée, Senegal.

== 19 July ==
List of shipwrecks: 19 July 1856
Ship	State	Description
Amitie	France	The schooner was wrecked near Roscoff, Finistère. All on board were rescued. She was on a voyage from Roscoff to Swansea, Glamorgan, United Kingdom.

== 21 July ==
List of shipwrecks: 21 July 1856
Ship	State	Description
Forest Oak	(United Kingdom of Great Britain and Ireland) British North America	The ship ran aground and capsized in the River Severn upstream of Sharpness, Gloucestershire. She was on a voyage from New Brunswick to Gloucester.

== 22 July ==
List of shipwrecks: 22 July 1856
Ship	State	Description
Mary Banfield	United Kingdom	The ship ran aground west of Dimnose. She was on a voyage from Hull, Yorkshire to Messina, Sicily. She had been refloated by 28 July and taken in to the Isles of Scilly.
Mearns	United Kingdom	The barque was wrecked at Cape Freels, Newfoundland, British North America, Her crew were rescued.
Zebra	United Kingdom	The steamship struck rocks and sank at The Lizard, Cornwall. All on board were rescued. She was on a voyage from Havre de Grâce, Seine-Inférieure, France to Liverpool, Lancashire.

== 23 July ==
List of shipwrecks: 23 July 1856
Ship	State	Description
Clarissa	India	The ship ran aground in the Setang River, Burma. She was capsized by a tidal bore on 3 August with the loss of seventeen of her crew.

== 24 July ==
List of shipwrecks: 24 July 1856
Ship	State	Description
Brothers	United Kingdom	The ship was wrecked on the Bird Rocks, off the coast of Newfoundland, British North America. Her crew were rescued by an American fishing vessel. She was on a voyage from Quebec City, Province of Canada, British North America to Newry, County Antrim.
Fox	United Kingdom	The smack ran aground on the Carrick Rock. She was on a voyage from Coleraine, County Antrim to Liverpool, Lancashire. She was refloated.

== 25 July ==
List of shipwrecks: 25 July 1856
Ship	State	Description
Anna Catherina	(United Kingdom of Great Britain and Ireland) Cape Colony	The cutter was driven ashore and wrecked at Cape Town.
Ann and Catherine	United Kingdom	The smack was driven ashore at Barmouth, Merionethshire. Her three crew were rescued by the Barmouth Lifeboat.
Flora	United Kingdom	The ship exploded at Swansea, Glamorgan, seriously injuring three of her crew.
Santo Andre	Spain	The galley foundered off Boa Vista in the Cape Verde Islands.

== 27 July ==
List of shipwrecks: 27 July 1856
Ship	State	Description
Benjamin Thaxter	United States	The ship was abandoned in the Atlantic Ocean. Her crew were rescued by General Taylor (United States). Benjamin Thaxter was on a voyage from Liverpool, Lancashire, United Kingdom to New York.

== 28 July ==
List of shipwrecks: 28 July 1856
Ship	State	Description
Clydesdale	United Kingdom	The ship ran aground on the Newcombe Sand, in the North Sea off the coast of Suffolk. She was on a voyage from London to Newcastle upon Tyne, Northumberland. She was refloated and resumed her voyage.
D'Orientale	Belgium	The barque capsized and sank in a squall off Rangoon, Burma.
Italian	United Kingdom	The steamship arrived at Lisbon, Portugal on fire and was beached. The fire was extinguished with assistance from Prince Jérôme (French Navy) and land based fire engines. She was on a voyage from Liverpool, Lancashire to a Genoa, Kingdom of Sardinia.

== 29 July ==
List of shipwrecks: 29 July 1856
Ship	State	Description
Monsoon	United Kingdom	The ship was abandoned off the Cape of Good Hope, Cape Colony. Her crew were rescued by Himalaya (United Kingdom). Monsoon was on a voyage from Akyab, Burma to Falmouth, Cornwall.

== 30 July ==
List of shipwrecks: 30 July 1856
Ship	State	Description
Louisa	United Kingdom	The ship ran aground on the Holm Sand, in the North Sea off the coast of Suffolk. She was on a voyage from London to Kirkcaldy, Fife. She was refloated and resumed her voyage.
Neptune	Norway	The brig ran aground 3 nautical miles (5.6 km) east of Østerisør, Denmark. She was on a voyage from Christiansand to Liverpool, Lancashire, United Kingdom.
Usk	United Kingdom	The ship was abandoned off the Cape of Good Hope, Cape Colony. All on board were rescued by Pyramid (United Kingdom). Usk was on a voyage from Akyab, Burma to Falmouth, Cornwall.

== 31 July ==
List of shipwrecks: 31 July 1856
Ship	State	Description
Louise Roelfina	Netherlands	The brig ran aground at St. James's Castle, Smyrna, Ottoman Empire. She was on a voyage from Smyrna to Cork, United Kingdom. She was refloated on 2 August and resumed her voyage.
Queen	United Kingdom	The ship was driven ashore at Cape North, Nova Scotia, British North America and was abandoned by her crew. She was on a voyage from Hull, Yorkshire to Quebec City, Province of Canada, British North America. She was refloated and taken in to Sydney, Nova Scotia.

== Unknown date ==
List of shipwrecks: Unknown date in July 1856
Ship	State	Description
Admiral Lucas	United Kingdom	The ship was driven ashore in the Bosphorus. Her crew were rescued.
Alma	United Kingdom	The ship heeled over at Penzance, Cornwall before 21 July and was damaged. She was righted and placed under repair.
Conqueror	United States	The ship was driven ashore and wrecked at West Cape, Prince Edward Island, British North America before 4 July.
George Whitewell	United Kingdom	The ship foundered in the Atlantic Ocean before 13 July. Her crew were rescued by Laura Campbell (United Kingdom).
Holfion	Norway	The ship was wrecked near Narva, Russia.
Jane	United Kingdom	The ship was wrecked near Narva.
Joseph Hume	United Kingdom	The ship was wrecked on the Krivaya Spit, in the Black Sea in late July.
Josephine l'Oiseau	France	The ship was wrecked at Port Elliot, South Australia.
Julia Morris	United Kingdom	The ship was driven ashore before 6 July. She was on a voyage from Liverpool to Tromsø, Norway.
Meta Hoffman	Grand Duchy of Mecklenburg-Schwerin	The ship was wrecked near Narva. Her crew were rescued.
Peter Maxwell	United Kingdom	The ship was driven ashore at Moosapee, Maine, United States. She was on a voyage from Liverpool, Lancashire to Saint John, New Brunswick, British North America. She was refloated and completed her voyage, arriving at St. John on 26 July.
Plantagenet	United Kingdom	The smack ran aground off Faro, Portugal.
Sarah	United Kingdom	The schooner was wrecked at Abermawr, Pembrokeshire with the loss of three of her five crew. She was on a voyage from Charleston, South Carolina, United States to Liverpool.
Sir Robert Peel	France	The ship was driven ashore wrecked on the west coast of Sumatra, Netherlands East Indies in an earthquake. Her crew were rescued.
Sylphide	United Kingdom	The ship foundered in the Mediterranean Sea off Mallorca, Spain before 28 July with the loss of her captain. She was on a voyage from Cardiff, Glamorgan to Marseille, Bouches-du-Rhône, France.
True Briton	United Kingdom	The sloop was wrecked at Abermawr.
Wyvern	New Zealand	The yacht is presumed to have been lost in a severe gale in the Tasman Sea in July 1856, during a passage from Nelson, New Zealand to Sydney, Australia. No wreckage or survivors were found.
