= Isallt Bach =

Coordinates: 53.283049°N 4.626801°W

- Location within Anglesey
- OS grid reference: SH 2498 7945
  - Cardiff: 138.7 mi (223.2 km)
  - London: 225.8 mi (363.4 km)
- Community: Trearddur
- Principal area: Anglesey
- Country: Wales
- Sovereign state: United Kingdom
- Post town: Holyhead
- Police: North Wales
- Fire: North Wales
- Ambulance: Welsh
- UK Parliament: Ynys Môn
- Senedd Cymru – Welsh Parliament: Ynys Môn

Isallt Bach is a hamlet in the community of Trearddur, Anglesey, Wales, which is 138.7 miles (223.3 km) from Cardiff and 225.8 miles (363.4 km) from London.

== See also ==
- List of localities in Wales by population
