= Church Bay, Anglesey =

Village in Wales

Coordinates: 53.372°N 4.553°W

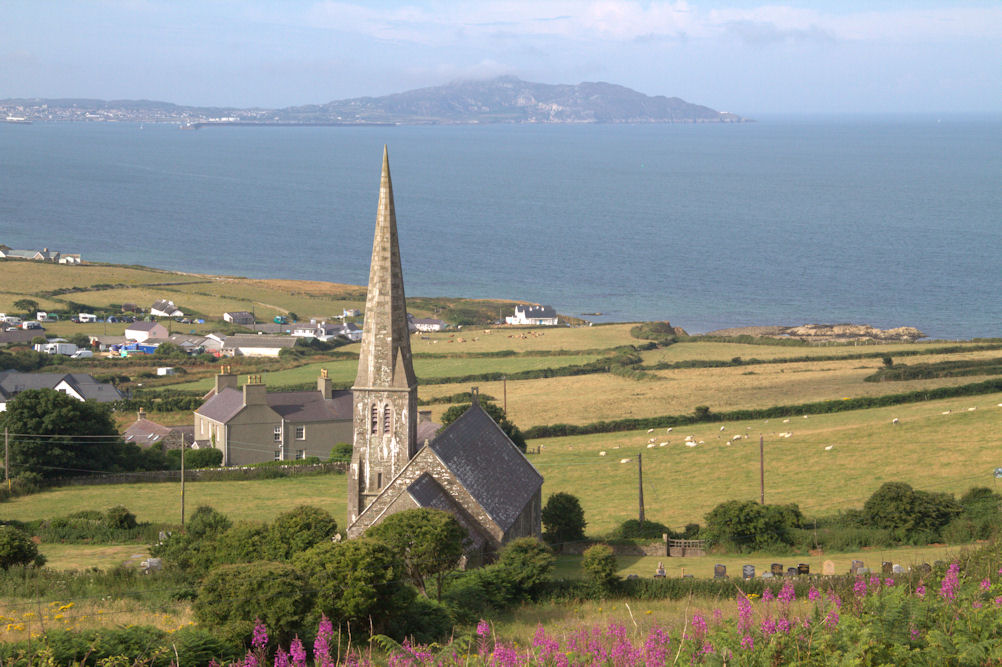
Church Bay, looking west towards Holy Island and Holyhead Mountain.

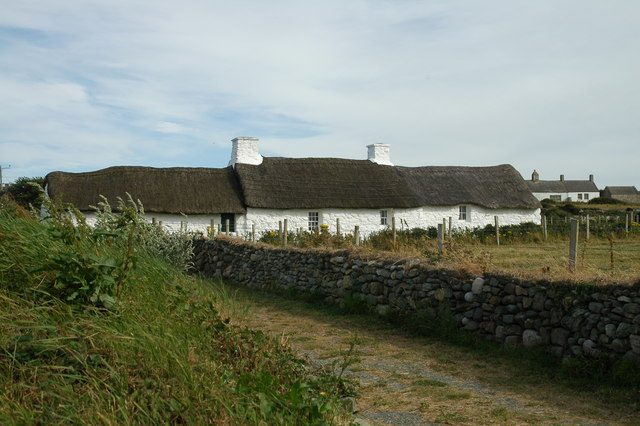
Swtan Cottage Museum

Church Bay (Welsh: Porth Swtan) is a settlement on the north-west coast of Anglesey, Wales, United Kingdom, about a mile and a half north-west of the village of Llanfaethlu. The bay shores are rocky but there is also a sandy beach which is popular with visitors. There are a handful of houses near the beach. The Anglesey Coastal Path runs along the cliff tops. There are records of the Swttan settlement going back to the reign of King Henry VIII, but there has probably been a settlement there for many centuries before this. Most of the properties are holiday homes for rent. Amenities include a cafe and a small museum based in a preserved 17th-century thatched cottage. This cottage's position could indicate that there has been a dwelling on this site since Neolithic times. The cottage won the Rural Wales Award from the Campaign for the Protection of Rural Wales (CPRW) in 2003.

There is also a ruined windmill, Melin Drylliau (Caerau Mill), first recorded in 1840 and destroyed in a fire in 1914. It was run by the Rowlands family who also ran a number of mills across the island.

The nearby sandy beach is named Porth Swtan (Port Whiting). The 61 bus route from Holyhead to Amlwch stops infrequently in the area.

== Etymology ==
The Welsh name, Porth Swtan, is named after the River Swtan, a small stream which reaches the sea below Church Bay. Swtan may be the name of the swtan ("sea-white") fish.

The English name, Church Bay, is the name used by sailors in the 19th century, the Church forming a visible landmark. The name is given to the larger bay but that has caused the loss of the names of many of the smaller coves dotted around the bay.
