= Four Mile Bridge =

Village in Anglesey, Wales

Coordinates: 53.2743°N 4.5808°W

Four Mile Bridge: Welsh: Pontrhydybont
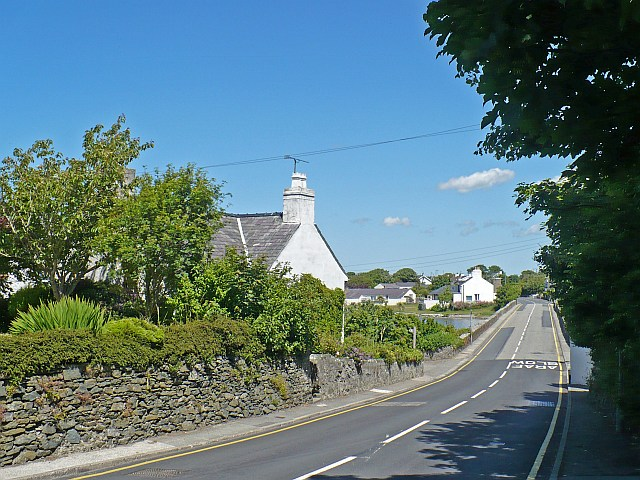
- Principal area: Anglesey
- Country: Wales
- Sovereign state: United Kingdom
- Police: North Wales
- Fire: North Wales
- Ambulance: Welsh
- UK Parliament: Ynys Môn
- Senedd Cymru – Welsh Parliament: Bangor Conwy Môn

Four Mile Bridge (Welsh: Pontrhydybont, Pont-rhydbont or Pontrhypont) is a village spanning both sides of the Cymyran Strait in Wales, connecting Holy Island with Anglesey, and is approximately three miles (5 km) southeast of Holyhead.

The village is quite small and is split between two communities on the two islands. The larger portion of the village is the principal settlement in the community of Rhoscolyn which recorded a population of 542 in the 2011 census. A small part of the village is in the community of Valley, Anglesey.

The village is about one mile (1.5 km) from Valley railway station, and is on the Isle of Anglesey Coastal Path. The village has a hairdressers and a pub named "The Anchorage".

== Crossing ==
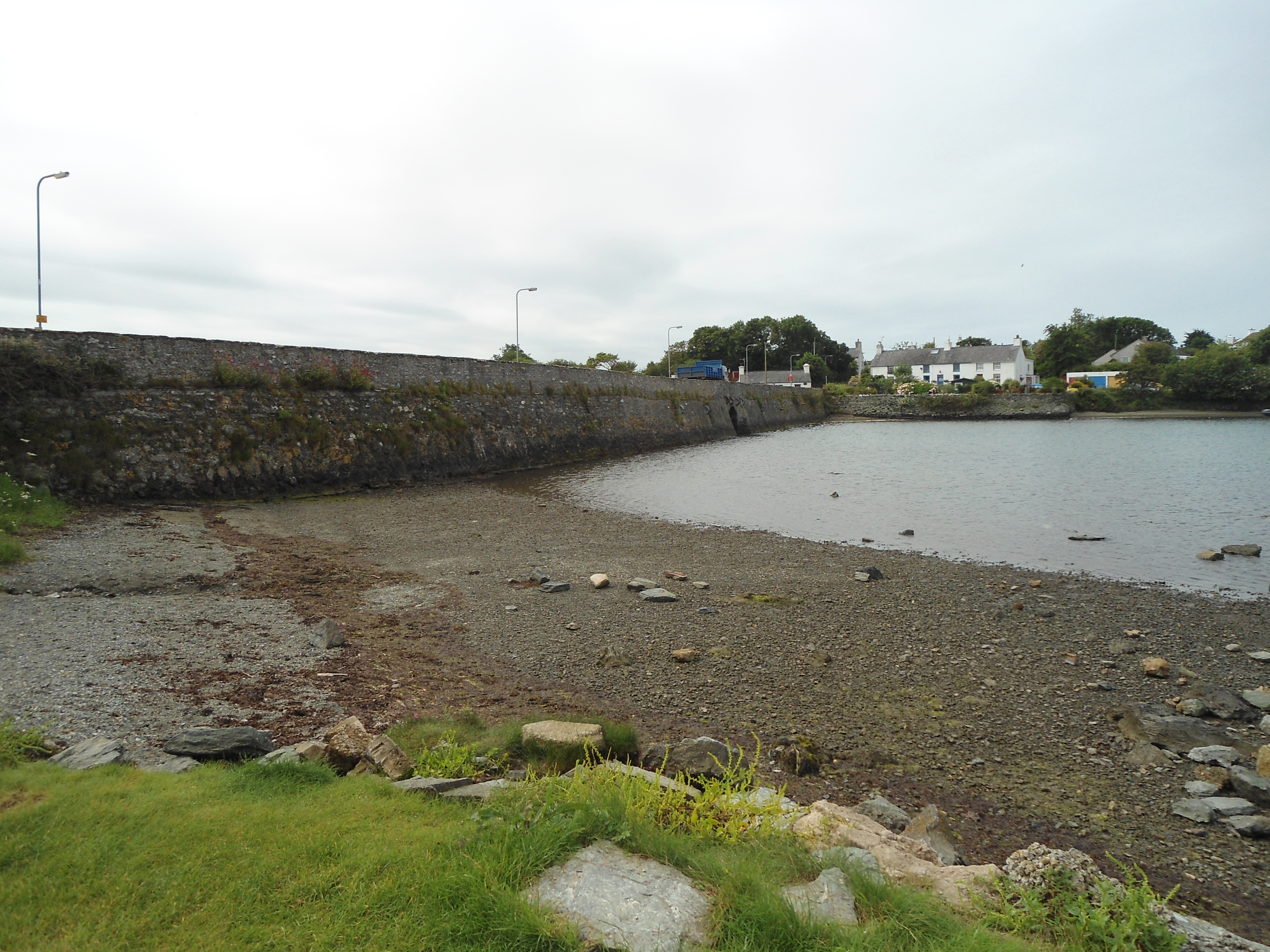
The bridge in 2012

The bridge itself takes the same name as the village it is situated in and is one of three bridges connecting Holy Island and Anglesey. The bridge is approximately four miles (6.5 km) from Holyhead via the old road route, giving it, and the village, its name. A bridge at this location was in existence by 1530, and was the only land route to Holyhead until the construction of the Stanley Embankment in 1823. It is 120 metres (390 ft) long and carries the B4545 road over the Cymyran strait.
