= St Gwenfaen's Church, Rhoscolyn =

St Gwenfaen's Church
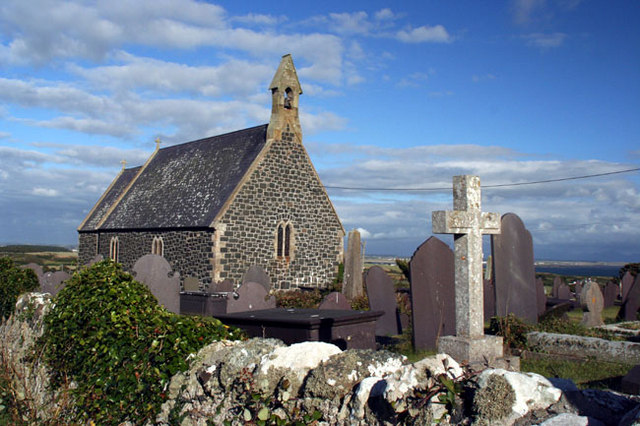

- 53°15′00″N 4°35′50″W
- Country: Wales
- Denomination: Church in Wales

History
- Founded: AD630 (rebuilt 1875–1879)

Architecture
- Heritage designation: Grade II
- Designated: 4 May 1971
- Architectural type: Church
- Style: Medieval

St Gwenfaen's Church is in the village of Rhoscolyn, on the Isle of Anglesey, Wales. The church was established in AD630, and was dedicated to St. Gwenfaen. The current church was erected in the Gothic-revival style, replacing the earlier building. It "was built in 1875 and enlarged by the addition of a chancel in 1879 ... the architect is thought to have been Sir George Gilbert Scott." It was designated as a Grade II listed building on 4 May 1971, as "a good example of a rural parish church, the simple Gothic style appropriate to its scale and site, and with rich interior fittings." These include "a fine C20 memorial of copper, with Art Nouveau styled design, to the Rector the Revd. John Hopkins, d.1901."
