= Penrhosfeilw =

Coordinates: 53.292677°N 4.663169°W

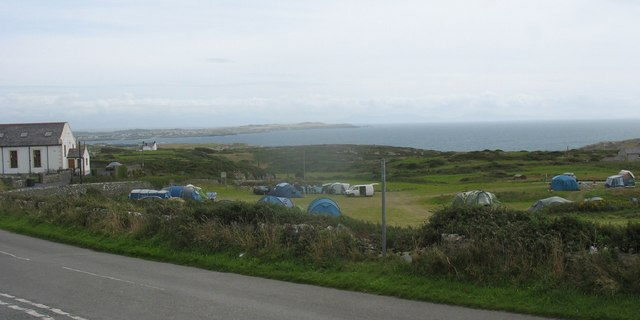

- Location within Anglesey
- OS grid reference: SH 2259 8061
  - Cardiff: 140.1 mi (225.5 km)
  - London: 227.5 mi (366.1 km)
- Community: Trearddur
- Principal area: Anglesey
- Country: Wales
- Sovereign state: United Kingdom
- Post town: Caergybi
- Police: North Wales
- Fire: North Wales
- Ambulance: Welsh
- UK Parliament: Ynys Môn
- Senedd Cymru – Welsh Parliament: Ynys Môn

Penrhosfeilw is a village in the community of Trearddur, Anglesey, Wales, which is 140.1 miles (225.4 km) from Cardiff and 227.5 miles (366.1 km) from London.

== See also ==
- List of localities in Wales by population
