= Cymyran Strait =

Strait in Wales

- Culfor Cymyran (Welsh)
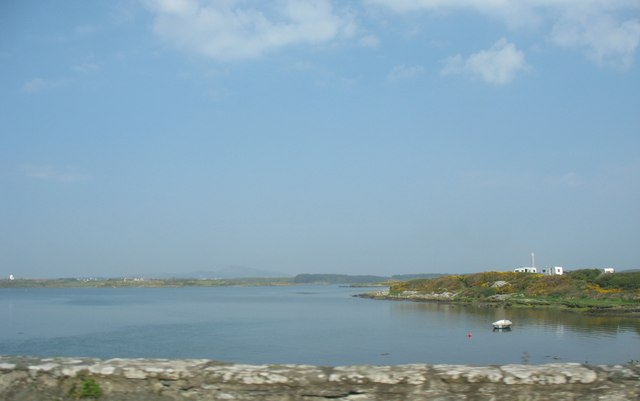
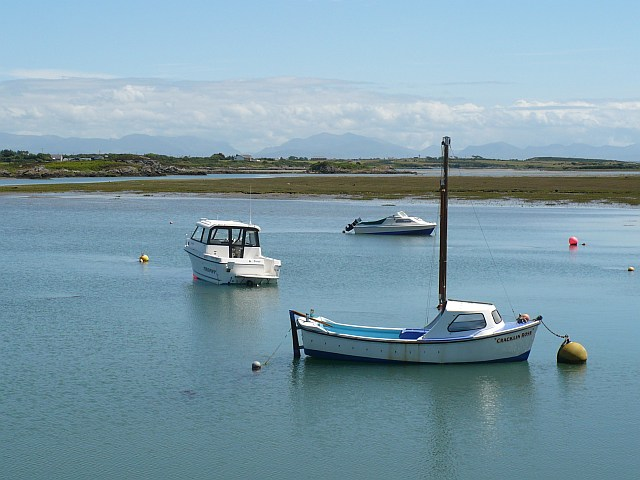
- The Cymyran Strait looking North (top) and South (bottom) from the Four Mile Bridge.

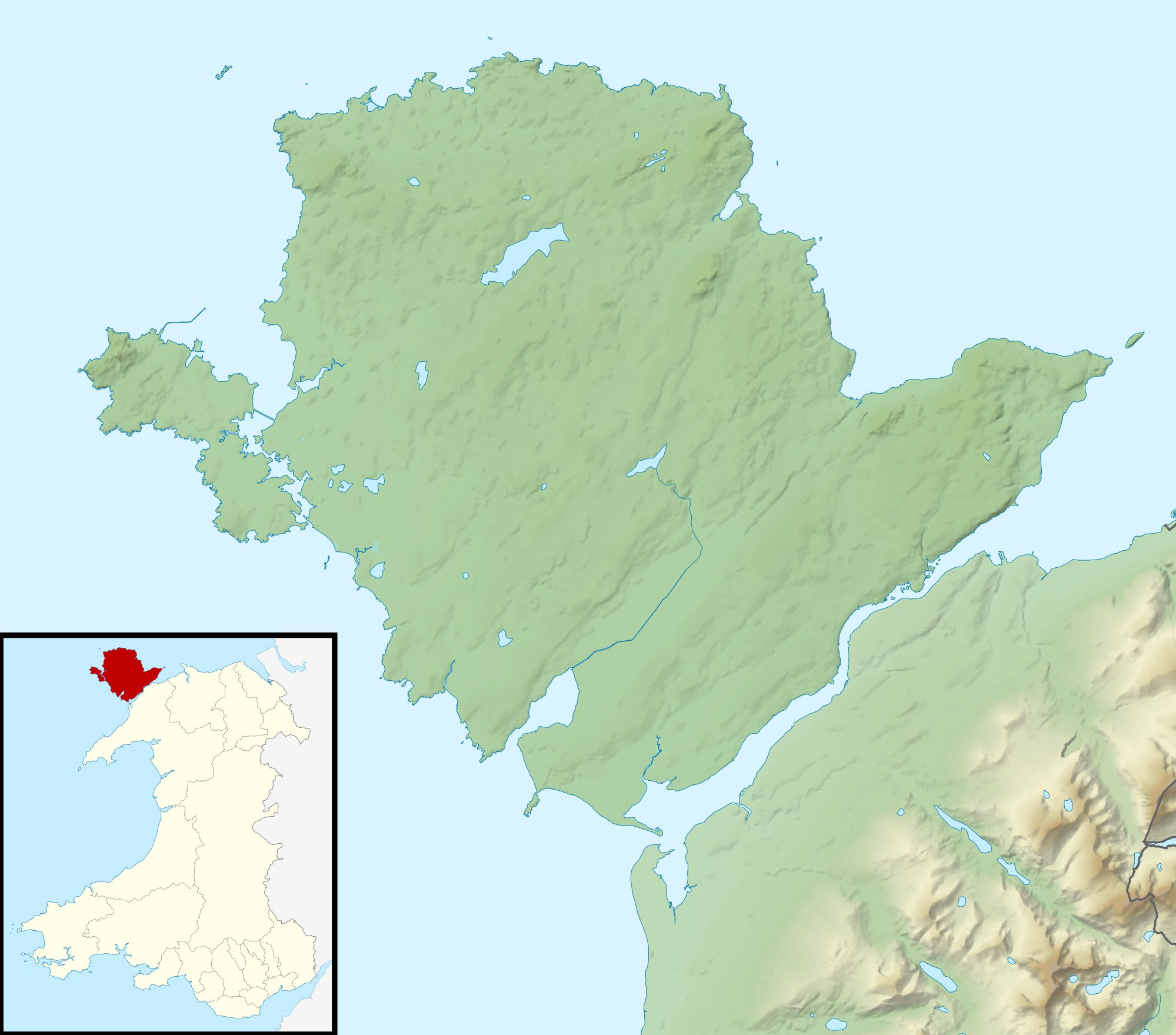
- Location within Anglesey
- Location: Irish Sea
- Coordinates: 53.2835°N 4.5879°W
- Type: Strait

Cymyran Strait (Welsh: Culfor Cymyran) is a strait that runs from Beddmanarch Bay in the north to Cymyran Bay in the south between the islands of Anglesey (Ynys Môn) and Holy Island (Ynys Cybi). At either end it opens up into the Irish Sea.

The strait was first crossed with a permanent land-link by the Four Mile Bridge that dates back to the 1500s. It was later crossed by the A5 London to Holyhead Road at Stanley Embankment in 1823, the North Wales Main Line using the same embankment in 1848, and finally the separate A55 expressway in 2001. The area specifically between the Stanley Embankment and the Four Mile Bridge is often referred to as the Inland Sea (Y Lasinwen) and is almost a lagoon.

The only settlement on the shores of the strait is Four Mile Bridge itself, although the town of Holyhead and the villages of Valley and Trearddur are close by.
