= Rhoscolyn =

Village in Anglesey, in north-west Wales

Coordinates: 53°15′N 4°36′W

- Village and community
- Borthwen Rhoscolyn

- Location within Anglesey
- Principal area: Isle of Anglesey
- Country: Wales
- Sovereign state: United Kingdom
- Police: North Wales
- Fire: North Wales
- Ambulance: Welsh
- UK Parliament: Ynys Môn
- Senedd Cymru – Welsh Parliament: Bangor Conwy Môn
- List of places UK Wales Anglesey Map of the community

Rhoscolyn is a village and community located on Holy Island, Anglesey, Wales. It is just over five miles south of Holyhead and is the most southerly settlement on the island. The name Rhoscolyn is said to mean "The Moor" (Rhos) of The Column (colyn), referring to a pillar which the Romans put up to mark the edge of their territories. The community population taken from the 2011 census was 542.

The community includes the larger part of the village of Four Mile Bridge, which extends into the community of Valley on the other side of the Cymyran Strait.

A little to the west of the village is a mediaeval well dedicated to St Gwenfaen beside which are the remains of a drystone well house measuring 4.5 m east–west by 5.5 m. The local church in the village itself is dedicated to the same saint and was first built in the 6th century.

The present church was built in 1875 and enlarged by the addition of a chancel in 1879. See also Wikipedia entry St Gwenfaen's Church, Rhoscolyn Among the interior fittings is a fine copper memorial in Art Nouveau style to the Revd. John Hopkins, who was Rector from 1876 until his death in 1901. Hopkins was obviously an effective and well-loved priest. There exists a 10,000 word appreciation of Hopkins written by "His Honour Judge Parry", a summer visitor who got to know him well. This includes many fascinating anecdotes illustrating the nature of rural life in late nineteenth century Anglesey.

Rhoscolyn is bordered to the south by a small enclosed bay called Borthwen which is bordered by a public beach. There was once a lifeboat station on Borthwen which was open between 1830 and 1929 which has been replaced by a navigational beacon on Ynysoedd Gwylanod ('Gulls' Islands'). Around these waters at the end of the 18th century was a thriving oyster catching industry, but this declined once the beds had been depleted. Existing buildings include the local pub, The White Eagle and the Ysgol Gynradd Santes Gwenfaen primary school which is found just over a mile north of the village.

Probably the most significant lifeboat incident here was the launch to the Timbo. On 1 December 1920 the small coaster, was en route to Ireland from Holyhead when she was overcome by a storm off South Stack and began to drift down the coast. The lifeboat was launched, with great difficulty in the heavy seas, and made a number of attempts to get a line aboard her, without success, until the cox decided no more could be done and the lifeboat started its return journey, from a point close to Ynys Llanddwyn. The lifeboat capsized and 5 of the 13 man crew were lost, and, a little later, 4 men from the Timbo as well. The ship eventually became stranded at Dinas Dinlle, was eventually refloated with the use of tugs until she struck Carreg y Trai reef off Abersoch and was lost.

== Notable people ==
- Sir Edward Atholl Oakeley, 7th Baronet of Shrewsbury (1900–1987), a British professional wrestler and wrestling promoter, known under the ring name Atholl Oakeley.
