= Trearddur =

Village and community in Anglesey, Wales

Trearddur Bay
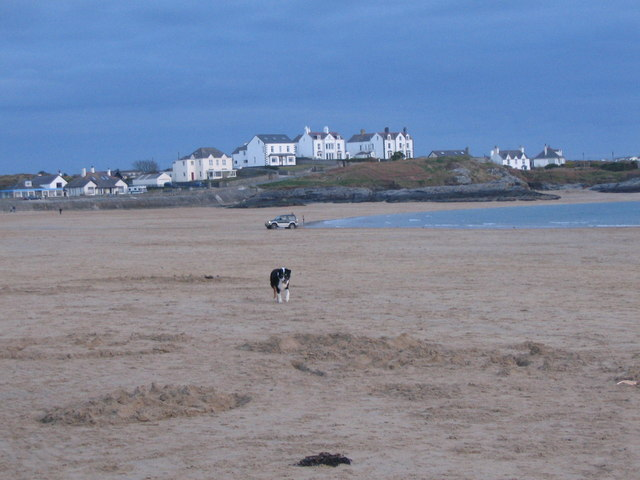

- Location within Anglesey
- Population: 1,686 (2011)
- Community: Trearddur
- Principal area: Anglesey
- Preserved county: Gwynedd
- Country: Wales
- Sovereign state: United Kingdom
- Post town: Holyhead
- Postcode district: LL65
- Police: North Wales
- Fire: North Wales
- Ambulance: Welsh
- List of places UK Wales Anglesey 53.283°N 4.617°W Map of the community

Trearddur or Trearddur Bay (Welsh: Bae Trearddur) is a village, seaside resort and community south of Holyhead on the west coast of Holy Island off the north-west coast of Anglesey in Wales. The community includes the small settlements of Penrhosfeilw and Goferydd and the Refail Farm estate.

== Name ==
Historically the bay on which the village sits was known as Porth y Capel (Welsh: bay of the chapel) and the nearby dunes as Towyn y Capel (dune of the chapel). The village name is recorded variously as Treffyarddr, Tre Iarthur and Trefarthur with Trearddur first recorded in 1749. All versions signify the settlement of Iarddur, a key figure in the Middle Ages.

== History ==
At the centre of the beach lies an ancient burial ground known by the old names and which was excavated in 2003.

At the 2001 census, the community had a population of 1,858, reducing to 1,686 at the 2011 census.

Like many places on the Welsh coast, Trearddur is somewhat anglicised, with 44% of the population born in England.

== Amenities ==
There is one general shop in the centre of the village, along with a garage, two golf courses (one 18-hole (Holyhead Golf Club) and one small 9-hole) and two hotels including a large hotel, Trearddur Bay Hotel, which overlooks the beach. The other is the Beach Motel. There are also a number of self-catering holiday cottages, many with views of the sea and easy access to the beaches.

The village has a number of pubs and restaurants including The Driftwood, Ocean's Edge, Seacroft, Sea Shanty and Farrell's Bar.

On the two beaches — Porth Diana and the main beach — there are some shallow scuba diving sites, and the main beach is one of the tourist hotspots of Anglesey. There is sea fishing in the area. Boat trips and fishing trips are available from the beach. Horse riding is available, as are kayaking and sailing. Trearddur Bay Sailing Club (founded in 1919) has over 1,000 members but, unusually, operates only in the month of August. Visitors can walk along the Anglesey Coastal Path towards neighbouring Rhoscolyn or in the other direction towards Porth Dafarch and on to South Stack and the RSPB Reserve and lighthouse.

Near the beach is a play area and a football pitch where Trearddur Bay FC play. The club provides football for youngsters within their girls' section and boys' section. They also have a disability section. They have two senior teams. The ladies play in the NWWL league and the men play in the North Wales Coast West Football League in the fourth tier of the Welsh football pyramid.

The village has had a lifeboat station since 1967.

The village hosts the Anglesey Oyster & Welsh Produce Festival.

== Governance ==
Until 2012 an electoral ward existed of the same name. The ward included the community of Rhoscolyn with a total population of 2,228. Following the Isle of Anglesey electoral boundary changes Trearddur became part of a larger Ynys Gybi ward, which includes part of Holyhead.

At the local level, the electorate of Trearddur are represented by twelve community councillors on Trearddur Community Council.
