= Holyhead Mountain =

Mountain on Holy island, Wales

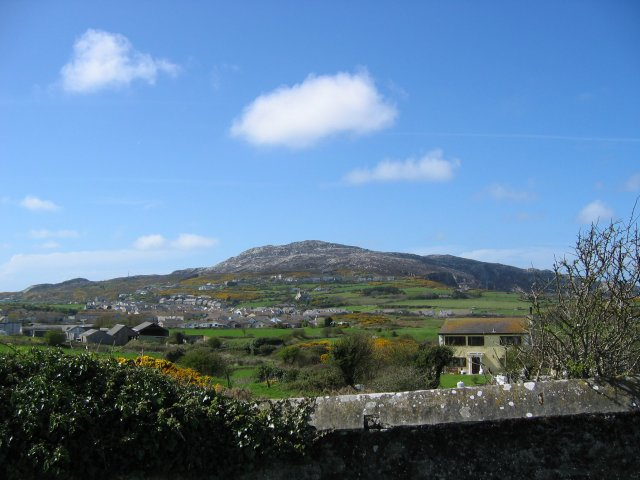
- Holyhead Mountain from the town's New Park

Highest point
- Elevation: 220 m (720 ft)
- Prominence: 220 m (720 ft)
- Parent peak: none - HP Holy Island
- Listing: Marilyn, council top
- Coordinates: 53°18′47″N 4°40′35″W

Geography
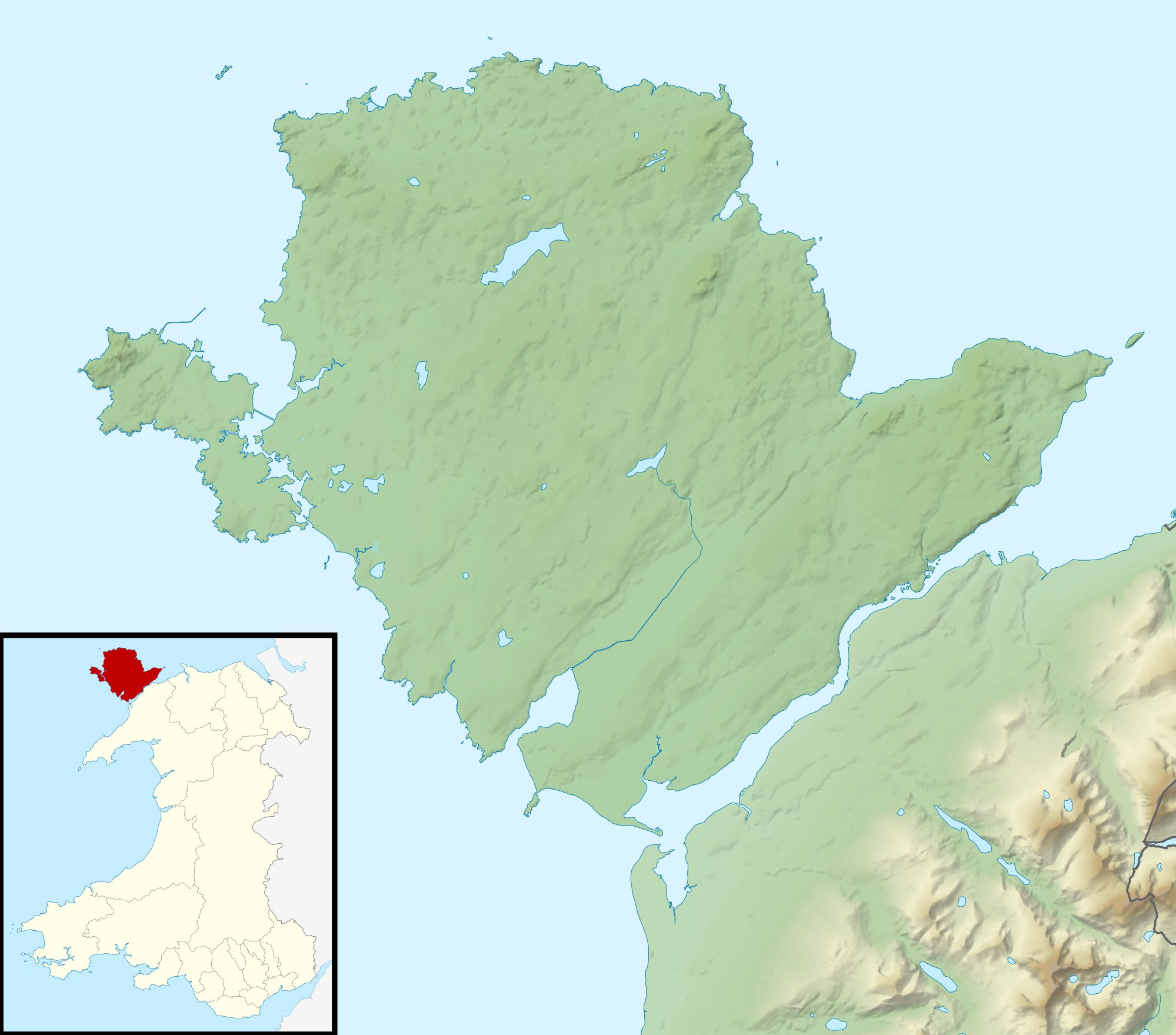
- Location within Anglesey
- Location: Anglesey, UK
- OS grid: SH218829
- Topo map: OS Landranger 114

Holyhead Mountain (Welsh Mynydd Twr, from mynydd 'mountain, unenclosed land' and twr 'a heap, pile') is the highest point on Holy Island, Anglesey, and in the county of Anglesey, north Wales. It lies about two miles west of the town of Holyhead, and slopes steeply down to the Irish Sea on two sides. Ireland can be seen from here on a clear day and the cliffs below are an important site for seabirds.

== Description ==
Holyhead Mountain is at the northern end of Holy Island, Anglesey, jutting out into the Irish Sea. At 722 feet (220 m), it is the highest point in the county of Anglesey, being higher than Bodafon Mountain (584 feet (178 m)) on the main island. On the east side is the site of a late Roman watchtower called Caer y Twr ('the fort of the pile/heap'). Holyhead Mountain also has the remains of a group of Iron Age huts near its foot. This shows evidence of being occupied in the middle part of the Stone Age, the Neolithic Age, the Bronze Age and the Iron Age. There are traces of field systems and the bases of dry-stone walls of twenty huts, and there are a number of standing stones in the vicinity.

The summit is rocky, quartzite, and the slopes clad in heather. There is an Iron Age hillfort called Caer y Twr. The material for the breakwater at the port of Holyhead was quarried from the limestone areas of the northeastern side of the island, with seven million tons of limestone being removed from long-established quarries to form the longest breakwater in Britain, at nearly one and a half miles (2.4 km) long. There are also the remains of a brickworks, which closed in 1973. Specialist bricks produced here were also used in construction of the breakwater.

Holyhead Mountain attracts many visitors, and it is close to South Stack lighthouse; many people come to see the variety of birds that nest along the cliff faces near South Stack. Views from the summit are extensive, especially to the west, where the Wicklow Mountains in Ireland can often be seen across the Irish Sea on clear days. Birds that nest here include Atlantic puffins, stonechats and Eurasian oystercatchers, and grey seals can be seen offshore during the summer.

== Gallery ==
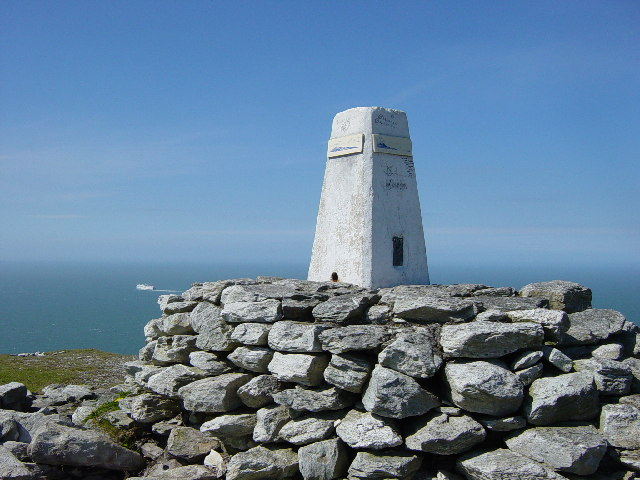
Trig point at the summit

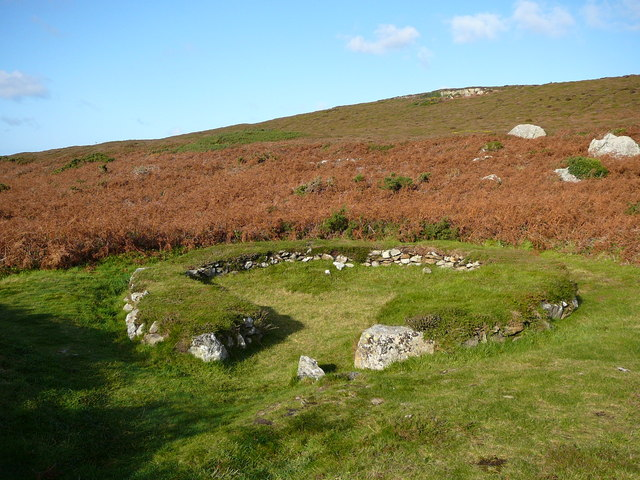
Prehistoric hut remains on the lower slopes

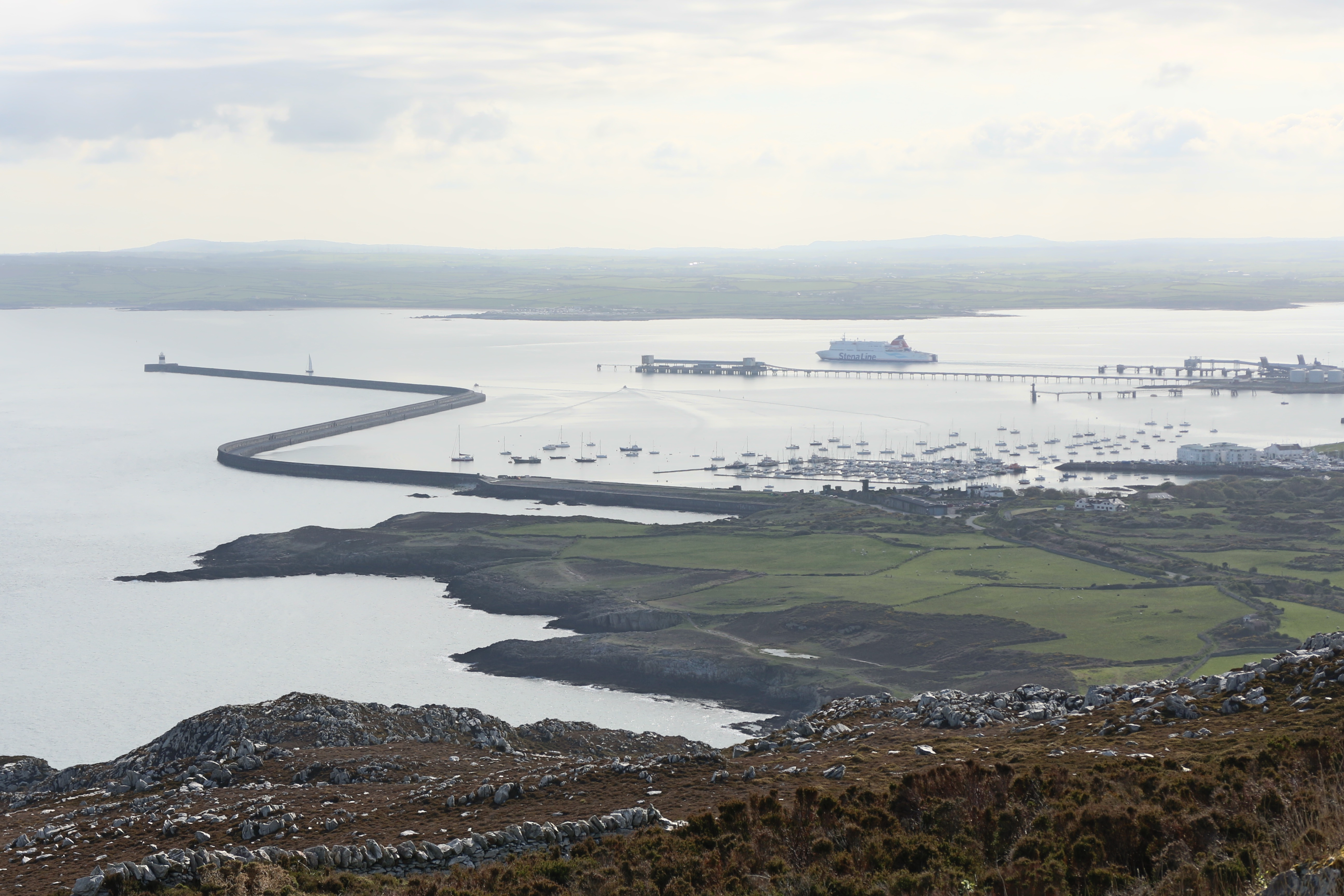
Holyhead Breakwater and harbour from the summit

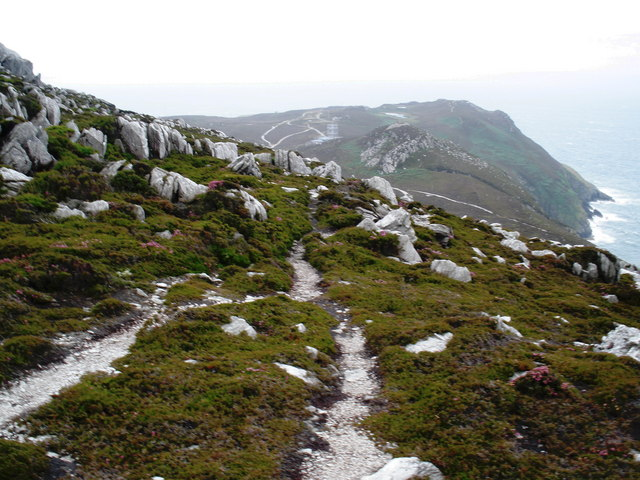
North face

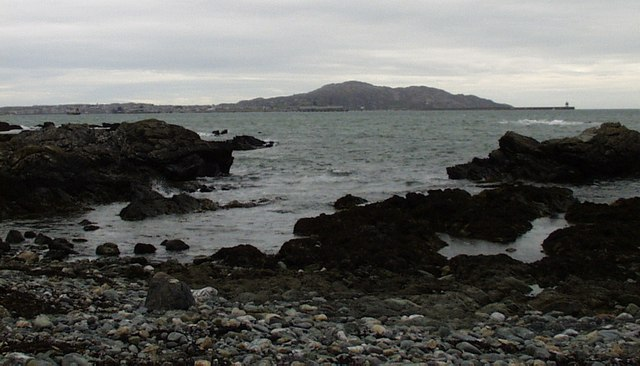
View from the west coast of Anglesey

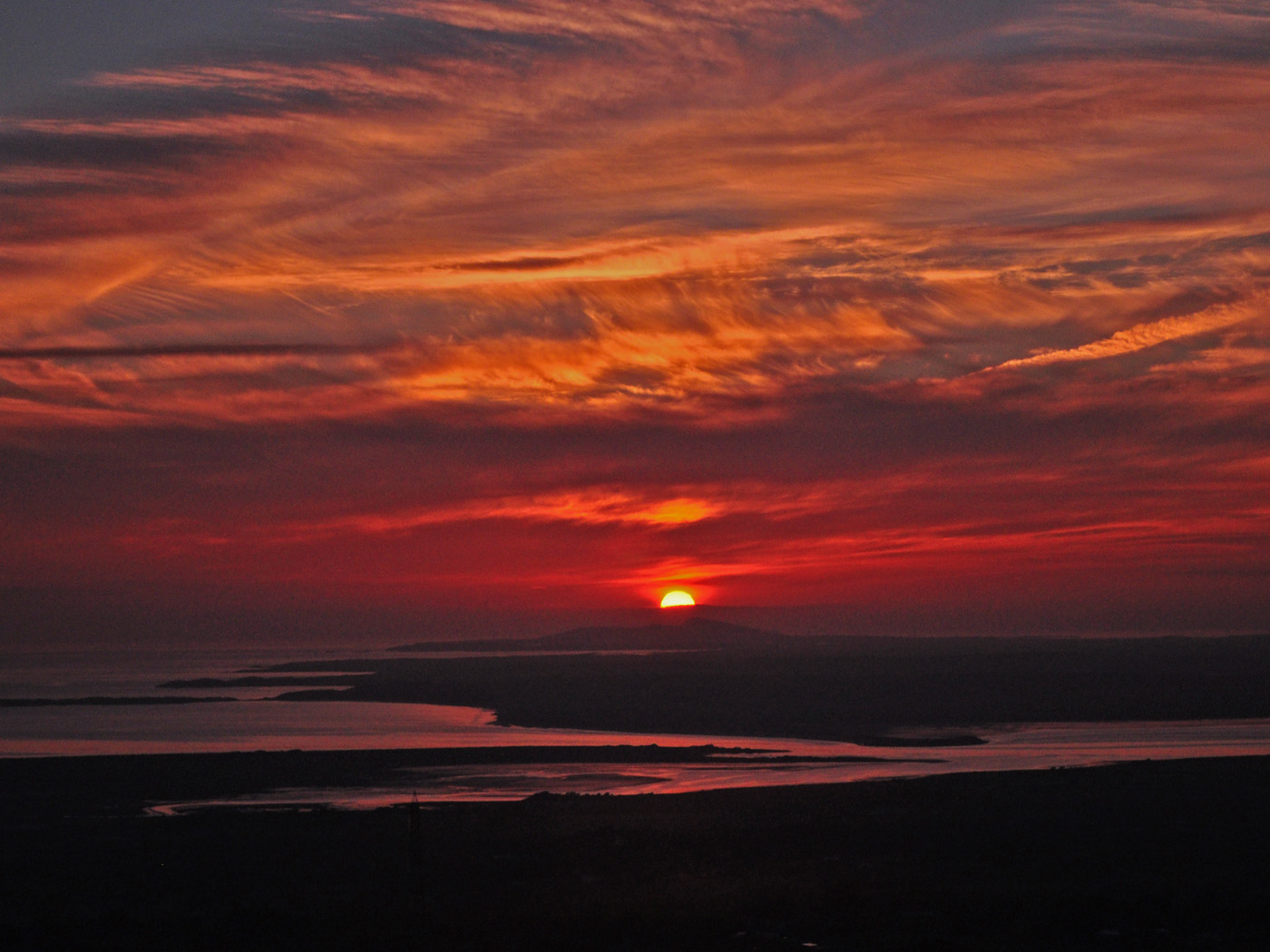
Sunset

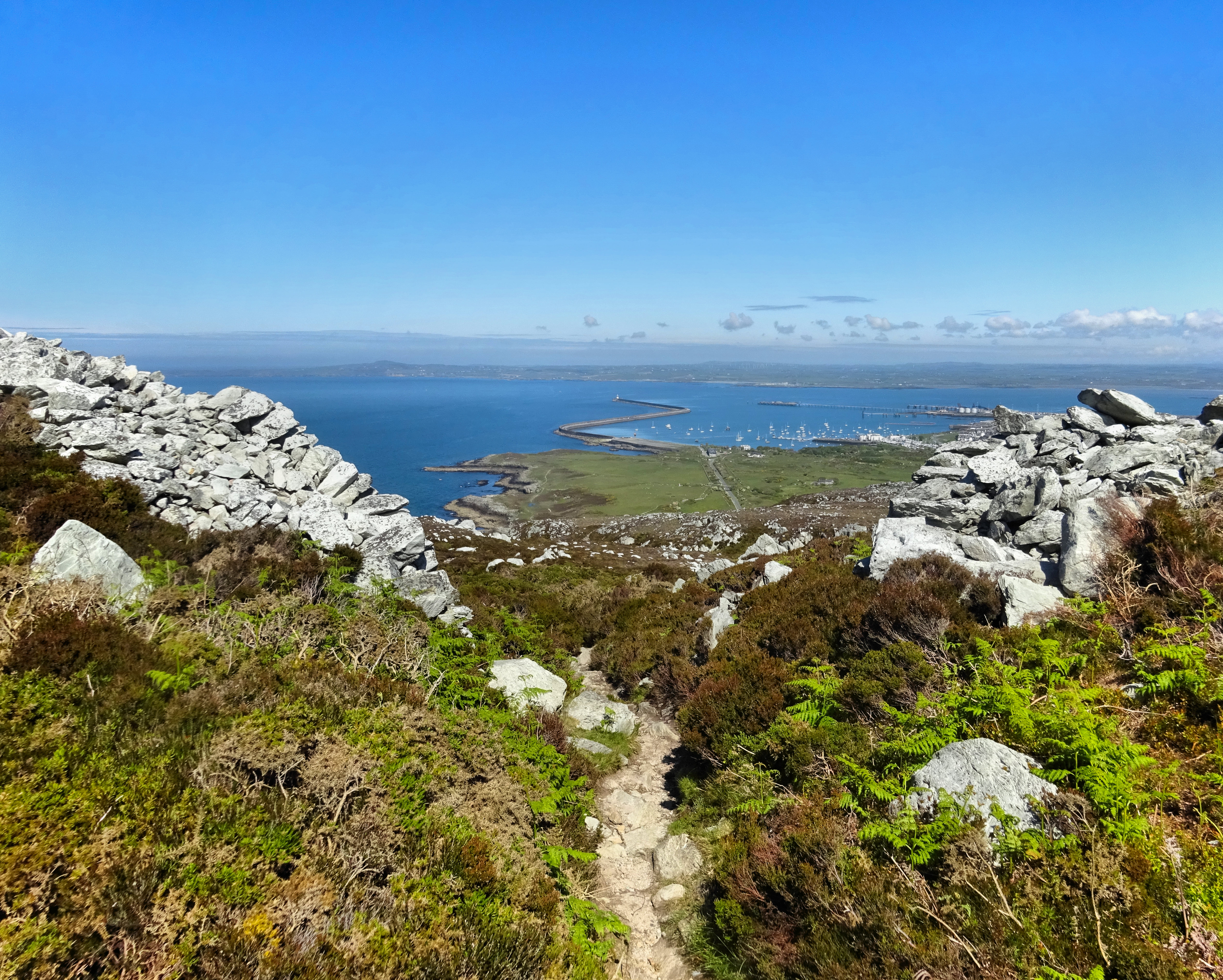
Main entrance to the Celtic fort.
