= Stanley Embankment =

Coastal embankment in Anglesey, Wales

Coordinates: 53.2899°N 4.5825°W

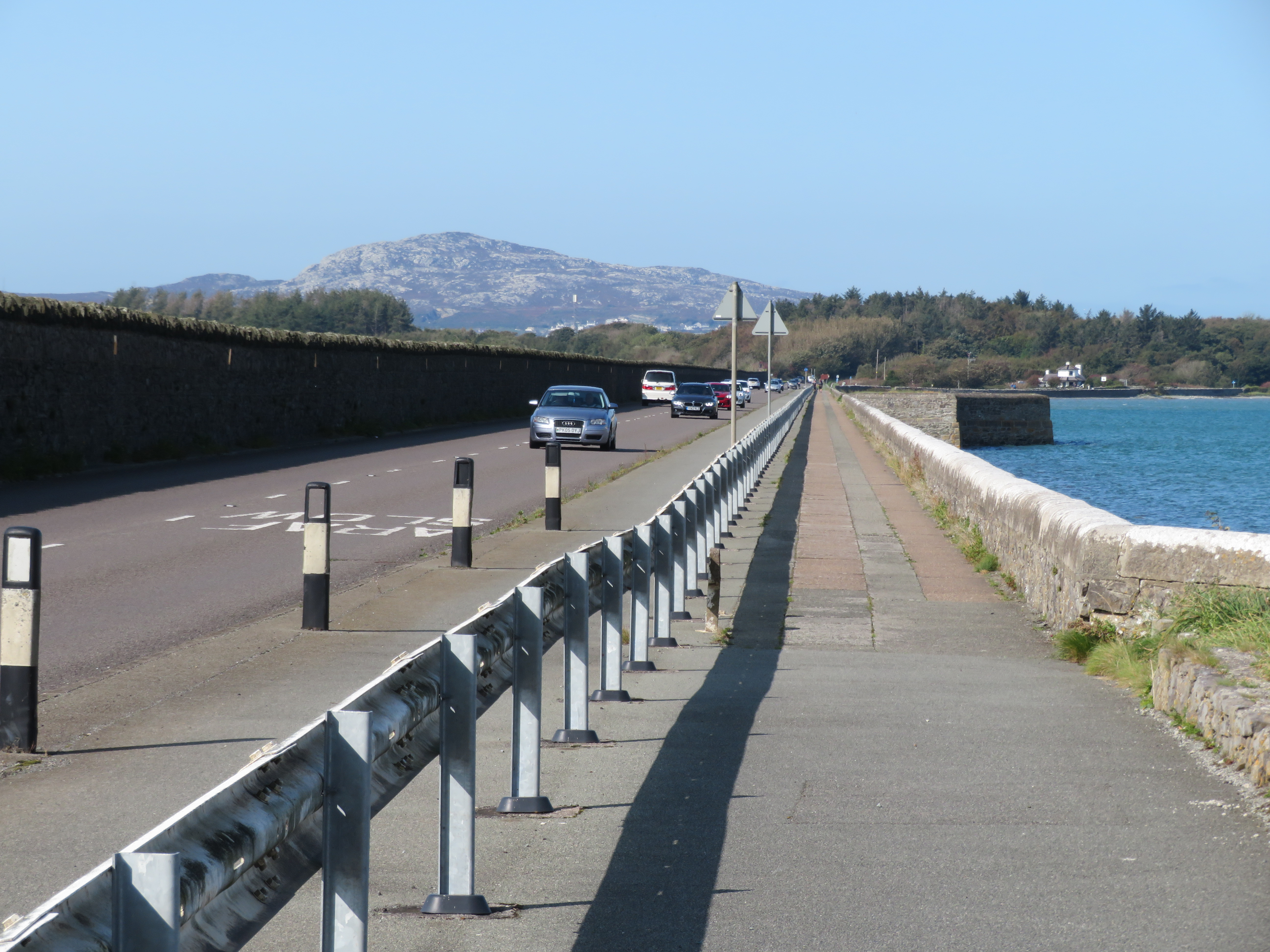
The A5 crossing the Stanley Embankment towards Holy Island

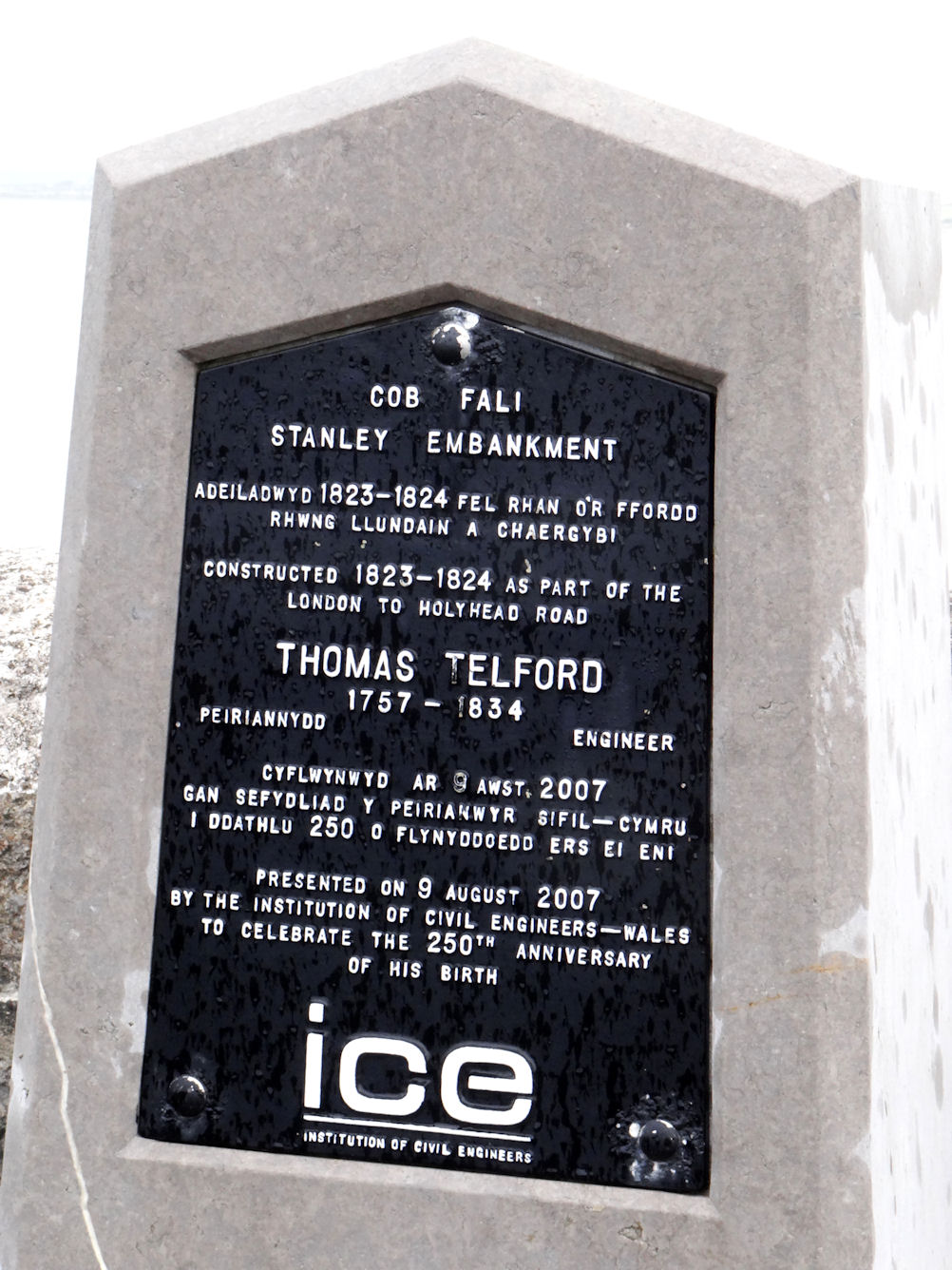
A plaque by the Institution of Civil Engineers on the embankment

The Stanley Embankment (known locally as "the Cob") is a railway, road and cycleway embankment that crosses the Cymyran Strait in Wales, connecting the island of Anglesey and Holy Island. It carries both the North Wales Main Line railway, which runs from Crewe to Holyhead, and the A5 road between London and Holyhead. The embankment was designed by, and its construction overseen by, Thomas Telford and it was named after the Stanley family who were significant benefactors to the area.

Prior to its construction, the fastest route to Holyhead from the island's mainland was via the old stone bridge at Four Mile Bridge (Welsh: Pontrhydybont). When the A5 road was being constructed between London and the Port of Holyhead, a more direct route was needed. Construction of the embankment started in 1822 and was completed a year later. It is a total of 3/4 mile (1.2 km) long, and is significantly wider at the base (35 metres (115 ft)) than at the top (10 m (33 ft)). The embankment to Holy Island was constructed using rock and materials excavated from a site on the Anglesey side. A workers' hamlet grew up around the artificially created depression, which was nicknamed "the valley". After work ended, the settlement remained developing into a medium-sized village known as Valley. A year after opening, the embankment was partly damaged in a storm in 1824.

In the 1840s, the embankment was selected to carry the North Wales Main Line to the Port of Holyhead, avoiding the need to construct an entirely new crossing. Work to significantly widen the structure was completed in 1848. To allay concern that passing trains might startle horse-drawn traffic using the embankment, a tall stone dividing wall was built between the road and the railway.

The embankment remained the only major crossing between Holy Island and Anglesey for more than 175 years. In 2001 it was superseded by a new wider embankment, which was built as part of the final section of the A55 North Wales Expressway. The section completely bypassed Valley and the old A5 at this point. The new crossing, which carries the modern A55 dual carriageway, was built parallel to the Stanley Embankment, following its north–south alignment.
