= Holy Island, Anglesey =

Island, part of Wales, United Kingdom

Holy Island
Native name: Ynys Gybi
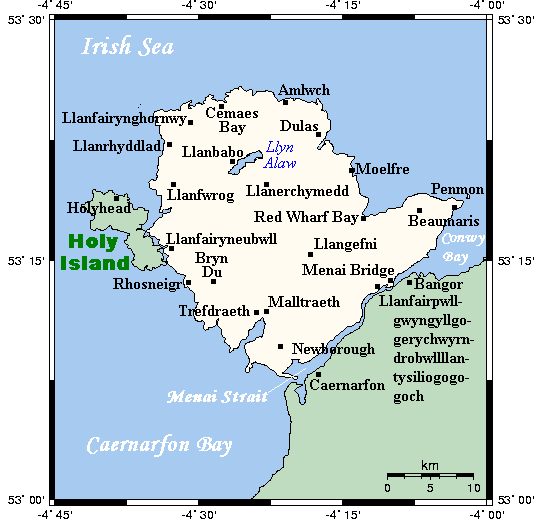
- A map showing the Isle of Anglesey and Holy Island

- Location within the United Kingdom Location within Wales

Geography
- Location: Irish Sea
- Coordinates: 53°17′N 4°37′W
- Archipelago: British Isles
- Area: 39.4 km^{2} (15.2 sq mi)
- Length: 12.3 km (7.64 mi)
- Width: 5.6 km (3.48 mi)
- Highest elevation: 220 m (720 ft)
- Highest point: Holyhead Mountain

Administration
- Wales
- County: Isle of Anglesey
- Largest settlement: Holyhead (pop. 11,237)

Demographics
- Population: 13,659 (2011)
- Pop. density: 346/km^{2} (896/sq mi)
- Ethnic groups: Welsh people

Holy Island (Welsh: Ynys Gybi, 'the island of (Saint) Cybi') is an island on the western side of the larger Isle of Anglesey, Wales, from which it is separated by the Cymyran Strait. It is called "Holy" because of the high concentration of standing stones, burial chambers and other religious sites on the small island. The alternative English name of the island is Holyhead Island. According to the 2011 UK Census, the population was 13,659, of whom 11,431 (84%) lived in the largest town, Holyhead.

== Prehistory ==
The settlement of Holy Island is dated to c. 4,000 BC with the discovery of an original Neolithic long house. The long house is similar to those found in Scotland and elsewhere in the British Isles. Also near the Neolithic site on the middle of Holy island is the Bronze Age Ty Mawr standing stone (Menhir), which is a Monolith measuring 2.67m high (8 feet).

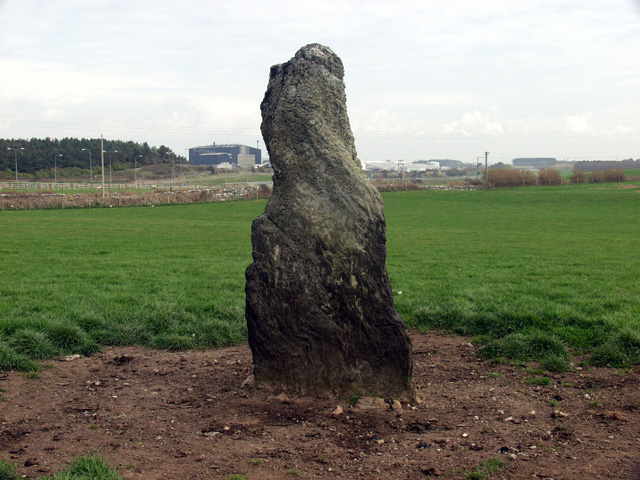
Ty Mawr standing stone, Holyhead

Permanent settlement on Anglesey was established in different forms for thousands of years. Many of these sites were used from Neolithic times. This was proven by pottery discoveries. There are ancient hillforts that were in use for nearly a millennium until the Roman invasion of Wales.

A well-preserved hut settlement on Anglesey was adjacent to the Holyhead Mountain hillfort. The Holyhead Mountain Hut Circles (Welsh: Tŷ Mawr / Cytiau'r Gwyddelod, Big house / "Irishmen's Huts") on Holy Island were inhabited before the Iron Ages, as of c. 1,000 BC. A stone wall built in the enclosure was found with limpet shells dating to 200 BC. Also at the huts was Roman-era ancient pottery proving the hut group habitation from the 3rd to 4th centuries AD. The Ty Mawr Hut Circles archaeological excavations were carried out by William Owen Stanley (son of Baron Stanley of Alderley) of Penrhos, Holy Island in 1862.

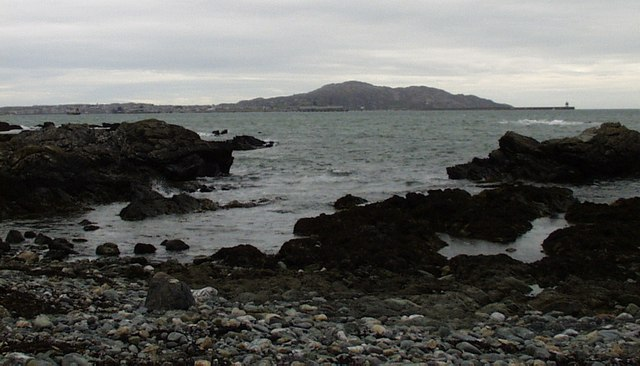
Holyhead Mountain

Irish settlers invaded Anglesey following the end of Roman rule in Britannia. Cunedda first began warfare against the Irish but ultimately Cadwallon Lawhir defeated the Irish on Holy Island.

== Natural features ==
There are a variety of natural habitats on the island including mudflats, dunes, marshes and beaches. Practically nothing is left of the oak forest that covered almost all of the island before the arrival of Neolithic farmers. The western side of the island is taken up mainly by Holyhead Mountain, an area of maritime heather moor, which is the highest peak in the county at 722 feet (220 m). North Stack and South Stack are two islands just off the coast by Holyhead Mountain. South Stack is joined to Holy Island by steep steps and a suspension bridge which provides access to the South Stack Lighthouse.

Whilst most of the coastline is rocky, there are sandy beaches at Trearddur Bay and Penrhos Country Park. Due to its rocky nature the island has seen many shipwrecks through the years. The coastal zone between the island and the mainland of Anglesey is a large site of special scientific interest: Beddmanarch–Cymyran.

== Transport ==
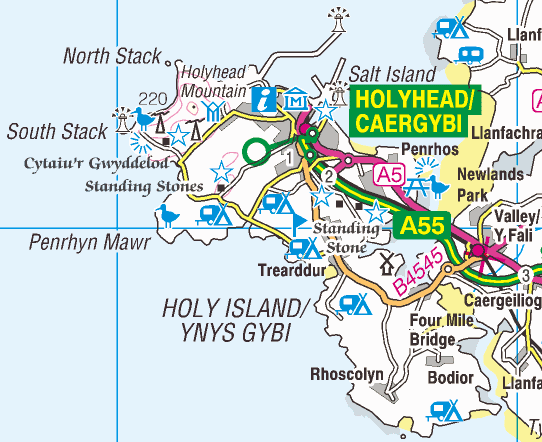
Ordnance Survey map of Holy Island, 2010

Holy Island is connected to Anglesey by two road links. The first, the Stanley Embankment, is made up of causeways carrying the A5 and A55. The second is the much older original link, Four Mile Bridge. The Stanley Embankment also carries the North Wales Coast Line which terminates at the island's only railway station, in Holyhead. The Port of Holyhead has passenger and freight ferries which travel to Dublin Port, Ireland. Buses from the island run to Amlwch, Llangefni and Bangor, amongst other places.

Around 30 miles (50 kilometres) of the 125-mile (200 km) Anglesey Coastal Path is on Holy Island. National Cycle Route 5 and National Cycle Route 8 traverse the island. The nearest airport is Anglesey Airport a few miles away on the Anglesey mainland and provides daily flights to Cardiff. The nearest major airport is Liverpool John Lennon Airport, 100 mi (160 km) away.

== Sport and tourism ==
There are three association football teams in the Welsh football league system on the island: Holyhead Hotspur, Holyhead Town and Trearddur Bay. The New Oval ground is home to the Ynys Môn football team and hosted the finals of the 2019 Inter Games Football Tournament. There is also a rugby union side and a golf course. Holyhead Park contains lawn bowling greens, three public tennis courts and a skate park. Like the rest of Anglesey, owing to its exposed location in the Irish Sea, surfing is popular.

Many people staying on Holy Island do so short term whilst waiting for the ferries to Dublin Port. As such the largest hotels (Travelodge and Premier Inn) are located close to the A5/A55 roads. Centred in Holyhead but dotted around the island (especially Trearddur Bay and Rhoscolyn) are quite a number of smaller bed and breakfast hotels and caravan parks for people who may wish to stay longer. Attractions in the area include South Stack Lighthouse and the RSPB reserve close by, the Breakwater Country Park, the RNLI museum and walks up Holyhead Mountain.

== Schools and governance ==
There are six primary schools and one secondary school, Ysgol Uwchradd Caergybi, which lays claim to being the first comprehensive school in England and Wales. Tertiary education can be found at Bangor University, some 20 miles (30 kilometres) away on the Welsh mainland.

Along with the rest of Anglesey, Holy Island is part of the Ynys Môn UK Parliament constituency and the Bangor Conwy Môn Senedd constituency. At a local level it is run by Isle of Anglesey County Council. Holy Island returns six of the 30 councillors to the county council, three for Caergybi (Holyhead town centre and surrounds) and three for Ynys Gybi (the southern extremes of Holyhead town and the more rural south). Holyhead Town Council is made up of seven electoral wards who return 16 councillors and appoint a mayor and deputy mayor annually.
