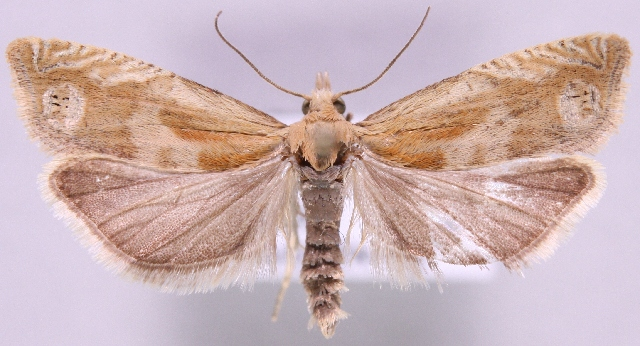

Scientific classification
- Kingdom: Animalia
- Phylum: Arthropoda
- Clade: Pancrustacea
- Class: Insecta
- Order: Lepidoptera
- Family: Tortricidae
- Genus: Eucosma
- Species: E. hohenwartiana

Binomial name
- Eucosma hohenwartiana (Denis & Schiffermuller, 1775)

Synonyms
- List: Tortrix hohenwartiana Denis & Schiffermuller, 1775; Phalaena cervana Scopoli, 1763; Semasia decipiana Laharpe, 1858; Grapholitha hohenwarthiana Treitschke, 1829; Tortrix (Semasia) jaceana Herrich-Schaffer, 1851; Tortrix pupillana Hubner, [1796-1799]; Tortrix scopoliana Haworth, [1811]; Carpocapsa strigana Curtis, 1831

= Eucosma hohenwartiana =

Species of moth

Eucosma hohenwartiana, the bright bell, is a species of moth of the family Tortricidae. It is found in China (Heilongjiang, jiangxi), Central Asia, North Africa and Europe, where it has been recorded from Sardinia, Sicily, Ireland, Great Britain, Spain, France, Germany, the Benelux, Denmark, Austria, Switzerland, Italy, the Czech Republic, Slovakia, Slovenia, Hungary, Poland, Romania, Bosnia and Herzegovina, Norway, Sweden, Finland, the Baltic region and Russia. The habitat consists of dry open areas and grassland.

The wingspan is 15–22 mm. It is very similar to Eucosma cana

The larvae feed on Centaurea cyanus, Centaurea scabiosa, Centaurea jacea, Serratula tinctoria, Carduus, Cirsium and Picris species.
