= Hainanecio =

Scientific classification
- Kingdom: Plantae
- Clade: Tracheophytes
- Clade: Angiosperms
- Clade: Eudicots
- Clade: Asterids
- Order: Asterales
- Family: Asteraceae
- Subfamily: Asteroideae
- Tribe: Senecioneae
- Subtribe: Senecioninae
- Genus: Hainanecio; Y. Liu & Q. E. Yang
- Species: H. hainanensis

Binomial name
- Hainanecio hainanensis (C. C. Chang & Y. C. Tseng) Y. Liu & Q. E. Yang

Genus of flowering perennial herb

Hainanecio (Chinese: 海南菊属) is a genus of flowering perennial herb endemic to Hainan Island, China. A single species, Hainanecio hainanensis, has been described from three populations on Hainan Island. It grows in shade in dense, broadleaved evergreen forests at 900–1200 m above sea level. It flowers from July to August and fruits in September to November.

The sole species was first described as Senecio hainanensis by C. C. Chang & Y. C. Tseng (1974) before being transferred to Sinosenecio by C. Jeffrey & Y. L. Chen (1984). It was believed to be the southernmost-occurring species of Sinosenecio before being reclassified in 2011 by Y. Liu & Q. E. Yang as its own genus and species. Molecular phylogenetic analysis places H. hainanensis as an isolated member of the subtribe Senecioninae, being only distantly related to Sinosenecio species with basic chromosome number 30 or Tephroseris species with basic chromosome number 24. Hainanecio chromosomes are significantly smaller (0.8–1.8 μm) than those typical of Sinosenecio (1.2–4.0 μm).

Hainanecio hainanensis may have 1 to several stems, with a stout rhizome up to 10 mm in diameter. The plant has several radical petiolate leaves of ovate to obovate shape with pinnate veining. The single radiate capitulum is white and composed of elliptic-oblong ray florets and many disc florets. The plant has truncate style arms, polarized and radial endothecial cell wall thickenings, and a cylindrical filament collar. It differs notably from Sinosenecio in its anthers that are rounded at the base and have ovoid and bubble-like anther apical appendages with enlarged abaxial cells. The plant lacks a pappus and has an obovoid, glabrous achene. Its pollen grains have a coarse tectum layer and are helianthoid and triporate rather than senecioid and tricolporate as seen in Sinosenecio. Like the subtribe Tussilagininae, it has polar and radial endothecial cell wall thickenings, cylindric antheropodia, and a basic chromosome number of 29.
