= Lower Woods =

Protected area in Gloucestershire, England

- Site of Special Scientific Interest
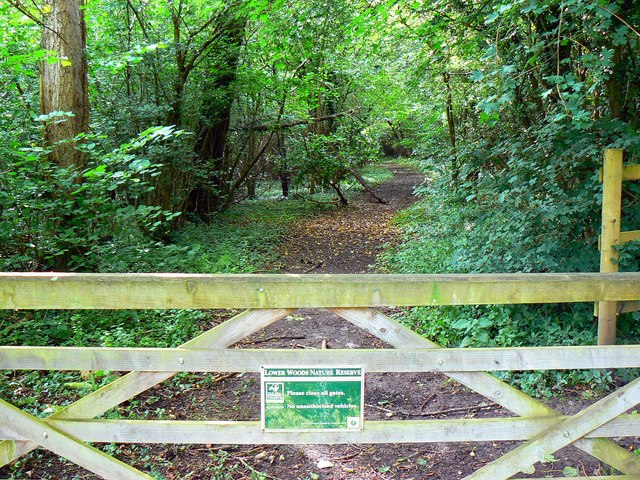
- Gateway and path at Lower Woods Nature Reserve

- Location within Gloucestershire
- Location of Lower Woods.
- Area of search: Gloucestershire
- Grid reference: ST743876
- Coordinates: 51.587°N 2.373°W
- Interest: Biological/Geological
- Area: 280.1 ha (692 acres)
- Notification date: 1966

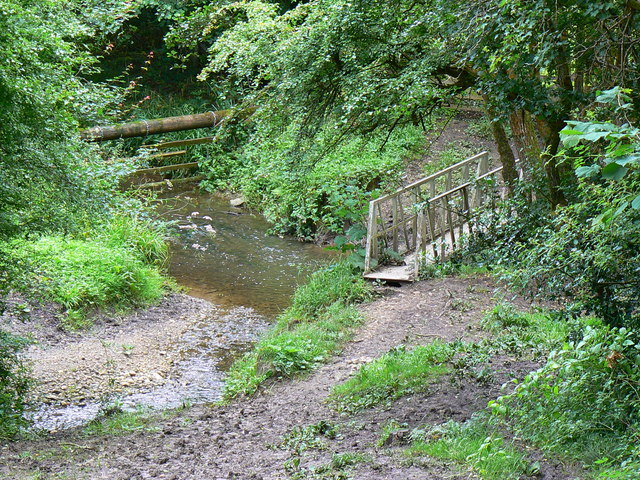
Confluence of streams and a bridge on the edge of Lower Woods Nature Reserve

Lower Woods (grid reference ST743876) is a 280.1-hectare (692-acre) biological and geological Site of Special Scientific Interest near the village of Wickwar, South Gloucestershire, notified in 1966 and renotified in 1985. The site area has increased at last revision in 1974 to a 284.1-hectare (702-acre) site. The site is a nature reserve managed by the Gloucestershire Wildlife Trust.

Lower Woods are the most extensive area of ancient woodlands and seminatural woodland in the former county of Avon and now in South Gloucestershire. It is one of the largest ancient woodlands in the south-west of England and covers some three square kilometres. There are three waymarked trails and over sixty miles of paths, rides and wide grassy 'trenches' (ancient roads).

This large reserve is made up of twenty-three woods and coppices, the boundaries of which have remained unchanged for several centuries. The woods are linked by a network of grass trenches and ridges. The Little Avon River runs through the centre of the site. The woods are situated in the damp clay soils of the Vale of Berkeley and are made up of the distinct woodlands as well as grassland areas.

The site is adjacent to Yarley Meadows which is also an SSSI.

== Geology ==
The site contains significant exposures of clays, shales, limestones and bone-beds (Rhaetic time period). These would have been laid down some 200 million years ago in a shallow sea. The exposures in this area have been a source of research for some 150 years, notably the units called the Westbury Beds, the Cotham Beds and the Liostrea Beds. The site has two horizons of Landscape Marble and outcrops of conglomeratic bone-beds (in the Westbury shales). The latter contain a significant amount of fossil fish, and sedimentological features.

== The woodland ==
Fuller information is available from the Gloucestershire Wildlife Trust nature reserves handbook and the Trust publication on the natural history of the site. Large parts of the woodland are traditional coppice-with-standards, with pedunculate oak and ash over hazel coppice. There is a wide range other shrubs including field maple, holly, goat willow, spindle, wild privet, midland hawthorn and guelder-rose. There are dense stands of wild service tree which is an indicator of ancient woodland. There is some sessile oak and along the riverside alder. Some of the wood has developed to a high forest structure.

== Woodland flowers ==
Fuller information is available from the Gloucestershire Wildlife Trust nature reserves handbook. Typical woodland flowers include bluebell, wood anemone, early-purple orchid, primrose, ramsons (wood garlic), common dog-violet and yellow archangel. Uncommon species are meadow saffron, herb-paris, common cow-wheat, bitter-vetch and violet helleborine. The grassy rides support betony, devil's-bit scabious, saw-wort, common spotted-orchid, greater knapweed, greater butterfly-orchid, cowslip and yellow-rattle. The damper rides supports lesser spearwort, ragged-robin, marsh ragwort, brooklime and various sedges and rushes.

== Mammals, birds and invertebrates ==
The site supports common dormouse and lesser horseshoe bat in particular. The site is considered as the most important in South Gloucestershire for nightingales. Also recorded are woodcock, lesser spotted woodpecker, wood warbler, tawny owl and turtle dove. The grassy rises, meadows and open coppice areas are ideal for rarer butterflies including white admiral, purple hairstreak, silver-washed fritillary, dingy skipper and brown argus.

== Conservation ==
The main aims are to monitor the maintenance and enhancement of existing grassland areas, the coppice regimes and to remove exotic species of conifer and hybrid poplar. Coppice must be maintained at-standards. Scrub cutting is done in the original trenches, ensuring exposure of the old wood banks and ditches.

== Publications ==
- Kelham, A, Sanderson, J, Doe, J, Edgeley-Smith, M, et al., 1979, 1990, 2002 editions, 'Nature Reserves of the Gloucestershire Trust for Nature Conservation/Gloucestershire Wildlife Trust'
- Martin M (editor), 1996, 2004 (revised second edition), 'Lower Woods Nature Reserve – A Guide', Gloucestershire Wildlife Trust
- Martin M, Rowlatt, S (editors), 2001(published), 'The Natural History of Lower Woods in 2000 AD', Gloucestershire Wildlife Trust, (includes list of contributors)
- 'Lower Woods Nature Reserve – Information and Waymarked Walks', (undated), Gloucestershire Wildlife Trust

== SSSI source ==
- Natural England SSSI information on the citation
- Natural England SSSI information on the Lower Woods units
