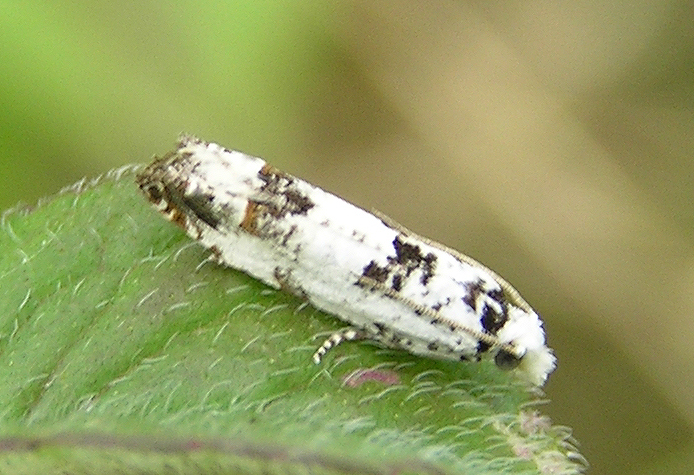

Scientific classification
- Kingdom: Animalia
- Phylum: Arthropoda
- Clade: Pancrustacea
- Class: Insecta
- Order: Lepidoptera
- Family: Tortricidae
- Genus: Eucosma
- Species: E. campoliliana

Binomial name
- Eucosma campoliliana (Denis & Schiffermüller, 1775)

Synonyms
- Tortrix campoliliana [Denis & Schiffermuller], 1775; Tortrix albana Haworth, [1811]; Grapholitha capitinivana Bruand, 1850; Grapholitha freyeriana Fischer von Roslerstamm, 1839; Calosetia nigrimaculana Barrett, 1874; Tortrix nigromaculana Haworth, [1811]; Anticlea nigromaculata Wood, 1839; Steganoptycha nigromaculana var. ussuriana Caradja, 1916

= Eucosma campoliliana =

Species of moth

Eucosma campoliliana is a moth of the family Tortricidae. It is found in Europe, China (Jilin, Heilongjiang), Japan and Russia.

The wingspan is 13–18 mm. The head is adorned with white hairs, while the thorax is black with white spots on the sides. The ground colour of the forewings is snow white, with an interrupted, light brown cross-band in the middle and the wing tip mostly brown. There are areas with small black spots at the base and in the outer part of the wing. The hindwings are light grey-brown.

The moth flies from June to August in western Europe.

The larvae feed on Jacobaea vulgaris and Tephroseris species.
