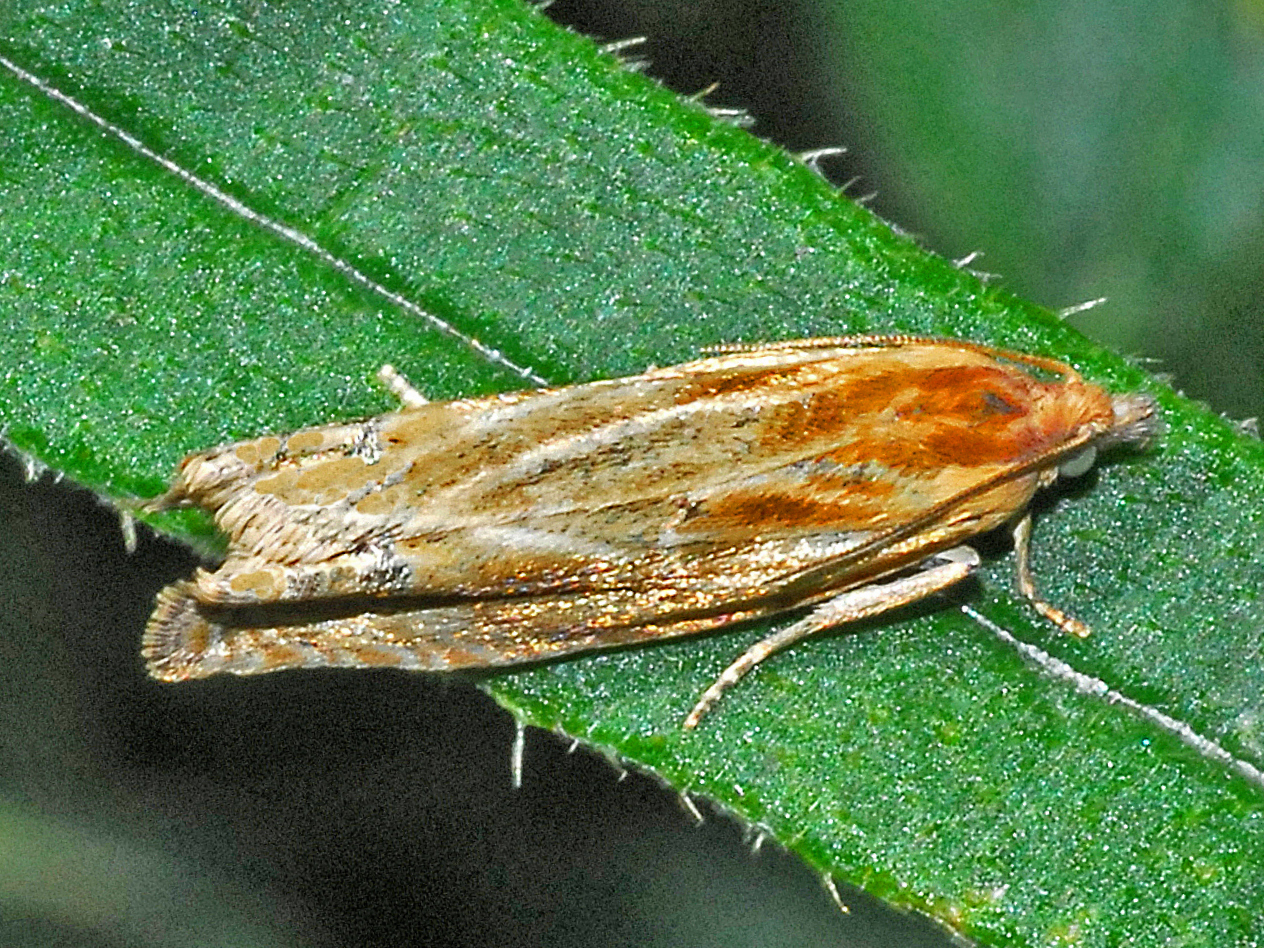
- Eucosma cana. Dorsal view

Scientific classification
- Kingdom: Animalia
- Phylum: Arthropoda
- Clade: Pancrustacea
- Class: Insecta
- Order: Lepidoptera
- Family: Tortricidae
- Genus: Eucosma
- Species: E. cana

Binomial name
- Eucosma cana (Haworth, 1811)

Synonyms
- Tortrix cana Haworth, 1811; Catoptria carduana Guenee, 1845; Pyralis marmorana Fabricius, 1798; Tortrix monetulana Hubner, [1814-1817]; Grapholitha cana var. subvittana Staudinger, 1892

= Eucosma cana =

Species of moth

Eucosma cana, the hoary bell, is a species of moth of the family Tortricidae.

== Distribution and habitat ==
This quite common and widespread species can be found in most of Europe, in China (Zhejiang, Fujian, Henan, Guangdong, Yunnan, Shaanxi, Gansu, Xinjiang), in Japan, in Central Asia, in Russia, and in Kazakhstan. These moths mainly inhabit flower meadows, rough grounds and waysides.

== Description ==
Eucosma cana can reach a body length of about 11.5 mm (0.45 in) and a wingspan of 16–23 mm. The head of these moths is reddish brown, while the thorax is light brownish on the sides, dark brownish in the middle. The ground colour of the forewings is light brown or greyish, with light longitudinal discal streaks. The edges are feathered. The hindwings are dark gray toward the margins. This species in rather similar to Eucosma hohenwartiana, which has a darker ground colour of the forewings, lacking the longitudinal lighter streaks. Meyrick describes it -The forewings are elongate, fold reaching to near middle; ochreous, somewhat blackish -sprinkled, with several suffused ochreous whitish longitudinal streaks confluent in middle towards base, ceasing before very narrow central fascia of ground-colour; an oblique wedge-shaped ferruginous suffusion from dorsum near base; posterior half of costa with very oblique whitish strigulae, abruptly ceasing at 1/3; ocellus metallic-edged, containing one or two incomplete black dashes; termen sinuate. Hindwings in male pale grey, darker terminally, in female darker. The larva is dull pink; head and plate of 2 brown.

== Biology ==
Adults are on wing in a single generation from June to August. The larvae are 10–11 mm long, pale orange or dark ocher, broad and somewhat flat. They feed on the flowerheads of Cirsium, Carduus species and of Centaurea nigra (black knapweed) and can be found from August to May.

== Bibliography ==
- Keith P. Bland, J. Razowski, E.F. Hancock The Moths and Butterflies of Great Britain and Ireland - Tortricidae, Olethreutinae Vol. 5, part 2.
- Haworth, A. H. (1803-1828): Lepidoptera britannica; sistens digestionem novam insectorum lepidopterorum quæ in Magna Britannia reperiuntur, larvarum pabulo, temporeque pascendi; expansione alarum; mensibusque volandi; synonymis atque locis observationibusque variis: I-XXXVI, 1-609. Londini (R. Taylor).
- Heppner, J. B. (1982): Dates of selected Lepidoptera literature for the western hemisphere fauna. — Journal of the Lepidopterologists' Society 36 (2): 87-111.
