= Holy Island Group =

Cambro-Ordovician geologic formation in Wales

- Stratigraphic range: Furongian-Tremadoc; ~497–477 Ma
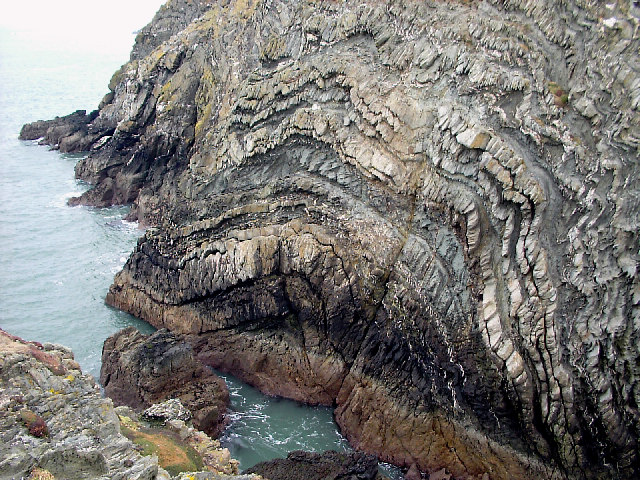
- Folded meta-sandstones and mudstones of the South Stack Formation, a subdivision of the Holy Island Group
- Type: Geological group
- Unit of: Monian Supergroup
- Sub-units: South Stack, Holyhead, Rhoscolyn and New Harbour formations
- Underlies: Cemaes Group (unconformity)
- Overlies: not exposed
- Thickness: over 3,000 m (9,800 ft)

Lithology
- Primary: Metamorphosed sandstone
- Other: Metamorphosed mudstone, quartzite, schist, phyllite etc

Location
- Coordinates: 53°18′N 4°40′W
- Region: Holy Island and Anglesey
- Country: Wales

Type section
- Named for: Holy Island, Anglesey
- Holy Island Group (the United Kingdom) Holy Island Group (Wales)

The Holy Island Group is a sequence of metasedimentary rocks of Cambro-Ordovician (Furongian to Tremadocian) age found in northern and western Anglesey and the adjacent Holy Island in North Wales. It comprises four formations; a lower South Stack Formation, an overlying Holyhead Formation, a succeeding Rhoscolyn Formation and an uppermost New Harbour Formation. The South Stack Formation outcrops on Holy Island, between Holyhead and South Stack and at Rhoscolyn, and also inland on Anglesey itself between Mynydd Mechell and Carreglefn. The Holyhead and Rhoscolyn formations are restricted to the Holyhead Mountain and Rhoscolyn areas of Holy Island. The New Harbour Formation, which previously enjoyed 'Group' status, is some 2 km thick and conformably overlies the Rhoscolyn Formation. It extends across much of northern and western Anglesey and Holy Island.
