= Elin's Tower =

Tower on Holy Island, Anglesey, Wales

Coordinates: 53.304134°N 4.693308°W

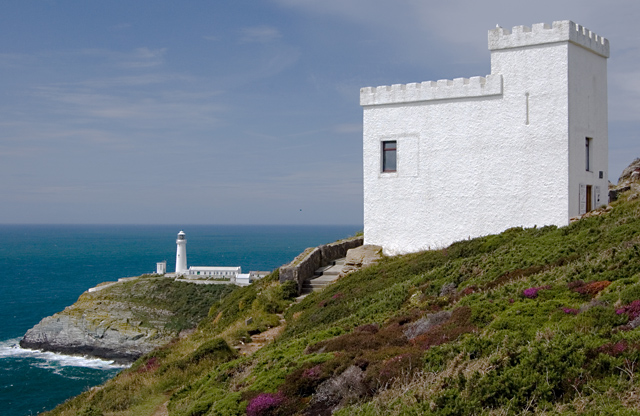
Elin's Tower (right) with South Stack Lighthouse

Elin's Tower (Welsh: Tŵr Elin) is a Victorian stone tower on Holy Island, located around 2 1/2 miles (4 km) west of Holyhead. The castellated folly, which was originally used as a summer house, was built between 1820 and 1850 for the notable Stanley family from Penrhos. It is named after Elin (anglicised as "Ellen"), the Welsh wife of the 19th-century politician William Owen Stanley.

The building near South Stack was used during both the First and Second World Wars as a coastal observation tower. However, it was abandoned and fell derelict. The restored tower is used as an RSPB information centre, shop and café for the nature reserve in which it is situated, and affords a good view of South Stack and its lighthouse. In 2007, the tower was damaged by vandals who used it for a drunken party.

== Gallery ==
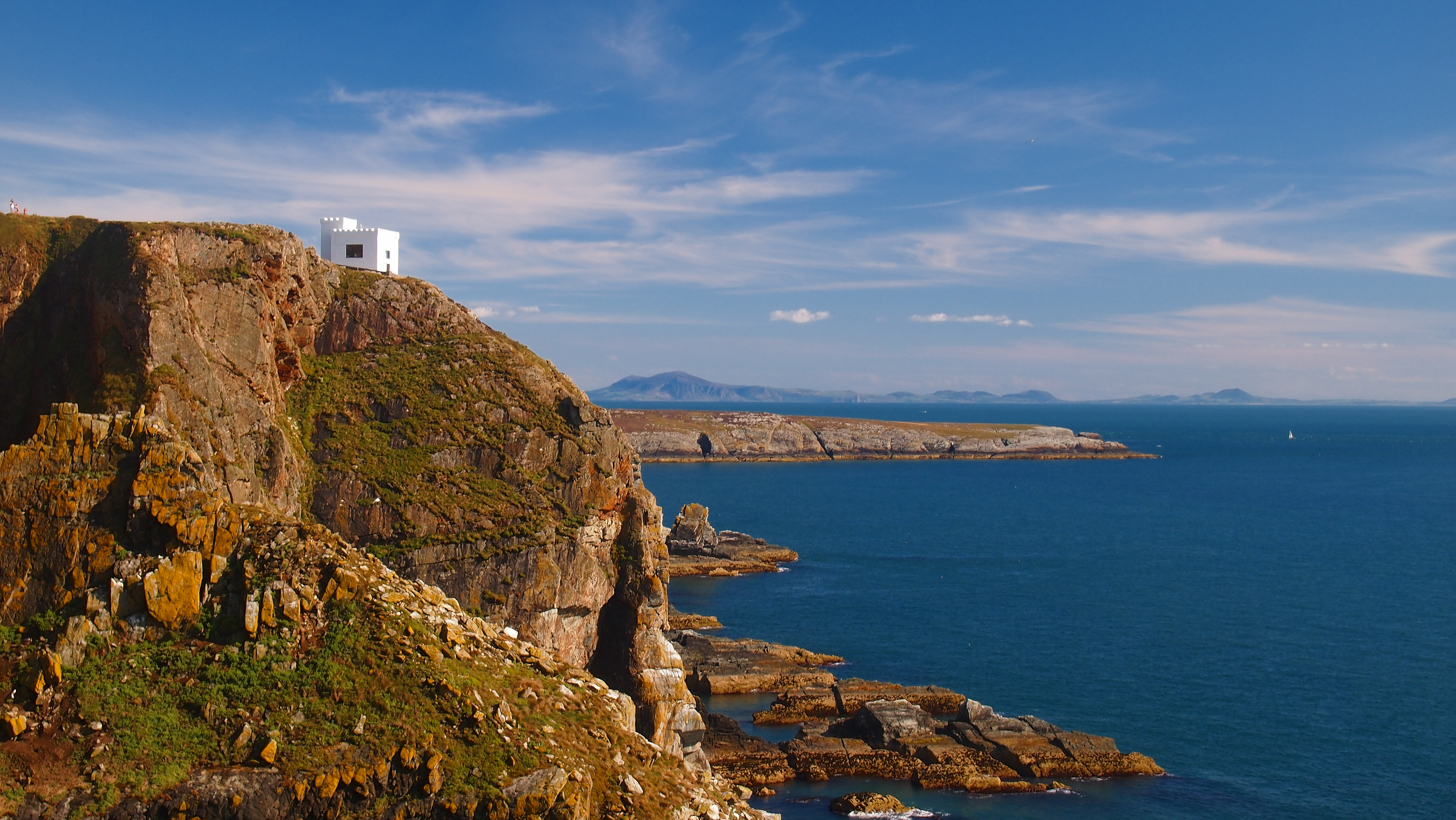
Elin's Tower and South Stack

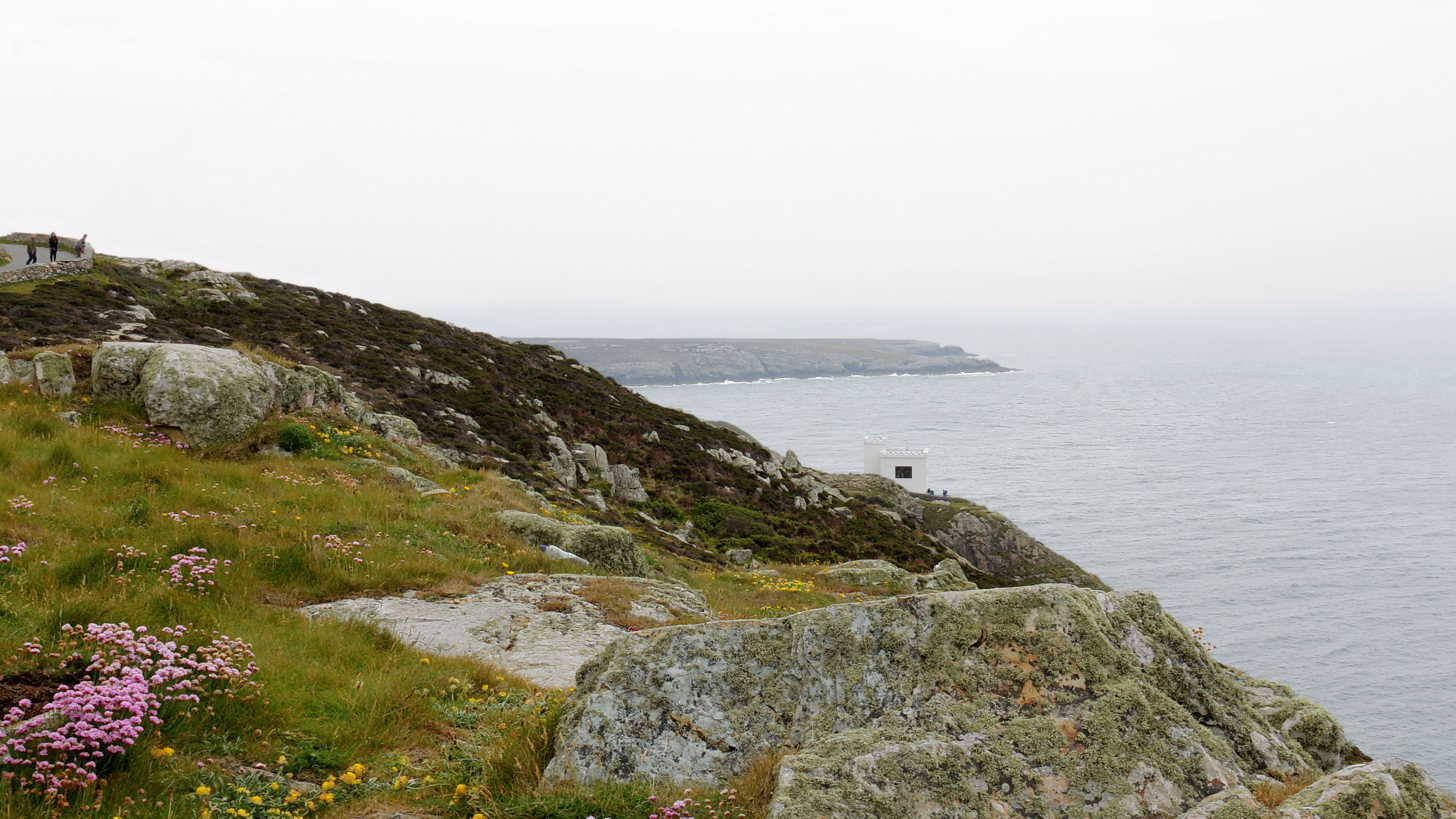
A clifftop view of the tower

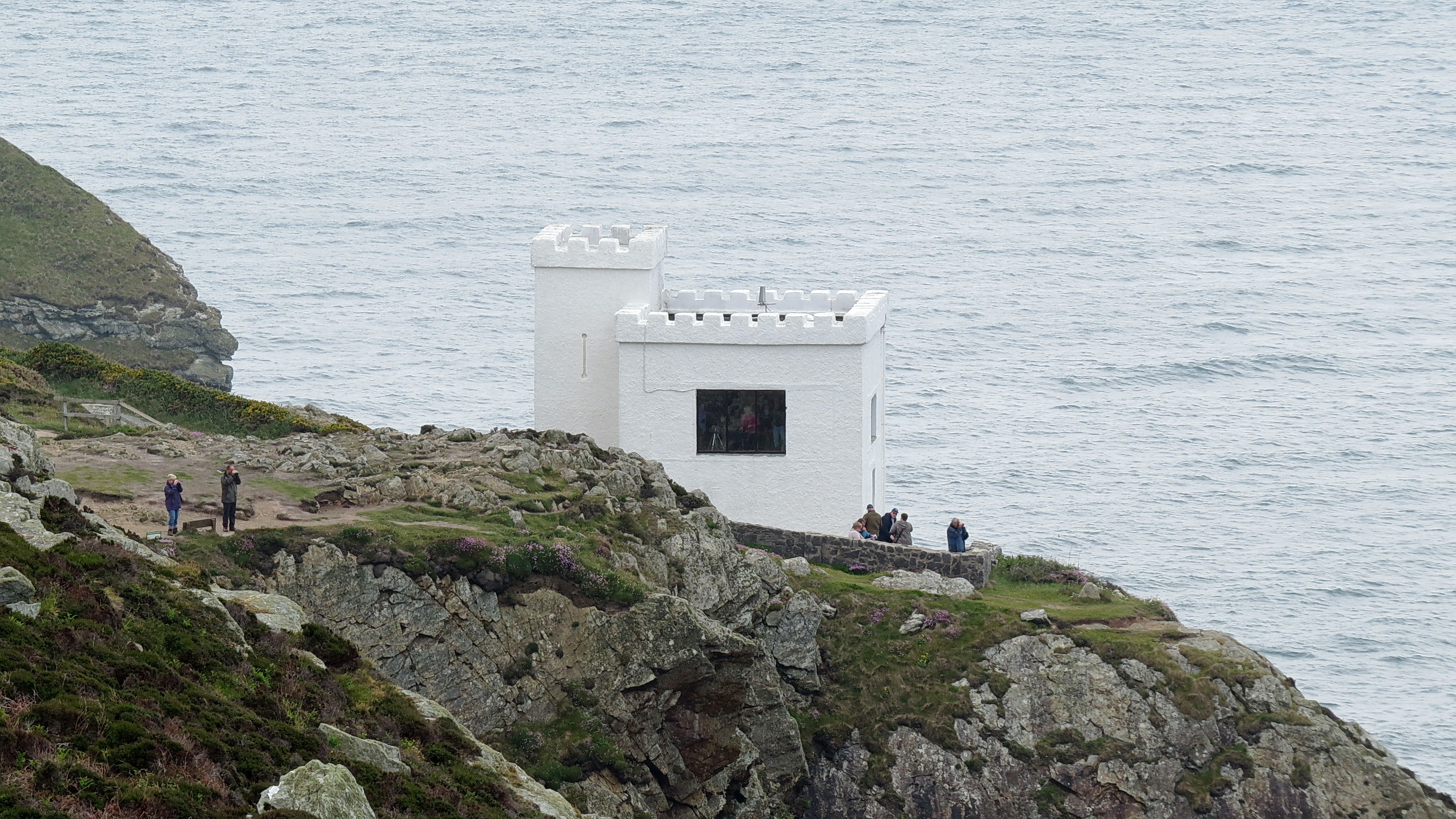
A close up of the upper RSPB viewing floor in the tower
