= Penrhos, Anglesey =

Former estate in Wales

Coordinates: 53.302146°N 4.596439°W

Penrhos
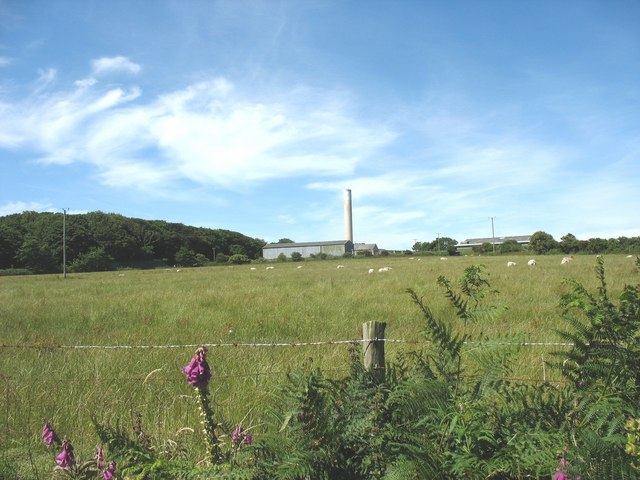

- Location within Anglesey
- Principal area: Anglesey
- Preserved county: Gwynedd
- Country: Wales
- Sovereign state: United Kingdom
- Police: North Wales
- Fire: North Wales
- Ambulance: Welsh
- UK Parliament: Ynys Môn
- Senedd Cymru – Welsh Parliament: Ynys Môn

Penrhos was a large estate on Holy Island, Anglesey, in north-west Wales.

== History ==
In 1553, during Edward VI's reign, Penrhos was granted to John-ap-Owen (also known as John Derwas). At this time, the land consisted of little more than the Penrhos headland upon which a farm was built, originally known as Tudor House and subsequently, Penrhos. The estate was the seat of the principal land and property owners on Holy Island for over 400 years, passing into the hands of the Stanley family following the marriage of Margaret Owen to Sir John Thomas Stanley in 1763. The Stanley family were notable residents in the area. They are remembered by having the Stanley Embankment named after Edward Owen Stanley as well as Ysbyty Penrhos Stanley (Holyhead Hospital) and The Stanley Arms, a pub in Holyhead. Amongst other things he constructed a sailor's hospital in the town and Elin's Tower near South Stack. At the outbreak of World War II in 1939, Penrhos was evacuated and the house occupied by troops. During this time the house and grounds were neglected and became ruinous in places. When the war ended, the existing tenants were given the opportunity to buy their properties and the remaining estate, covering thousands of acres, was sold off.

The Penrhos mansion was bought by Sir Patrick Abercrombie with a view to its partial restoration. His ambition was never realised, and the remains were systematically plundered and subsequently demolished. The Home Farm at Penrhos was bought by Captain Nigel Conant, the estate's land agent, who continued to farm some 500 acres (200 ha) until its sale in 1969—for the development of the Anglesey Aluminium smelting plant. Anglesey Aluminium granted public access in 1972 under the direction of Ken Williams, a local policeman and amateur naturalist.

Penrhos Nature Reserve was officially opened by H.R.H. Prince Charles in 1971, which was then owned by Anglesey Aluminium.

Since the company's closure in 2009, there have been several planning applications put to the council seeking permission to build on the site. On 6 November 2013, Land & Lakes Anglesey Ltd were successful, gaining approval for their planning application for a leisure centre to be constructed on the coastal landscape, an Area of Outstanding Natural Beauty. The development was intended to initially offer accommodation and transport options for a proportion of the incoming construction workforce for the proposed new Wylfa power station approximately 15 miles (24 km) away.

If the development proceeds, it will bring about the closure of most of the Penrhos Nature Reserve to the public as it is now known. In May 2025 the owners of the land entered administration.
