= Trobelno =

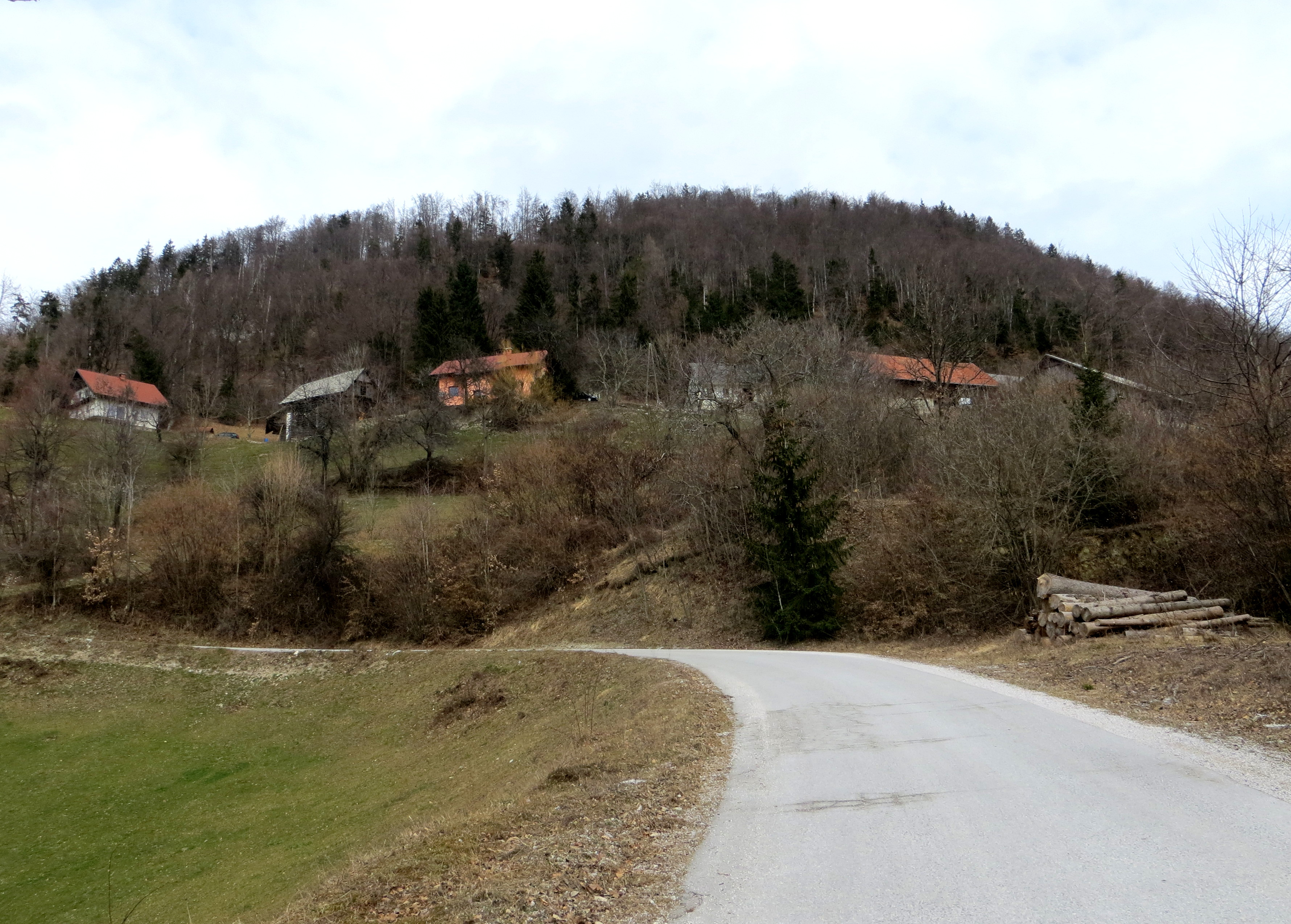

- Location in Slovenia
- Coordinates: 46°15′50.33″N 14°42′5.27″E
- Country: Slovenia
- Traditional region: Upper Carniola
- Statistical region: Central Slovenia
- Municipality: Kamnik

Area
  - Total: 1.18 km^{2} (0.46 sq mi)
- Elevation: 732.3 m (2,403 ft)

Population (2002)
  - Total: 20

Trobelno (pronounced [tɾɔˈbeːu̯nɔ], in older sources Trobevno; German: Trobeuno) is a small dispersed settlement in the hills above the Tuhinj Valley in the Municipality of Kamnik in the Upper Carniola region of Slovenia.

== Name ==
The origin of the name Trobelno is uncertain. It may derive from the same root as Slovene trebelje (< *trobeljȅ) 'swamp ragwort', referring to the local vegetation. Another possibility is derivation from the Slavic personal name *Trěbelъ. The place name may share the same origin as Trebelno and Trebelno pri Palovčah, based on medieval attestations of those names.
