= South Stack Cliffs RSPB reserve =

RSPB nature reserve in Anglesey, UK

South Stack Cliffs RSPB reserve is a nature reserve, run by the Royal Society for the Protection of Birds (RSPB), on Holy Island on the North West coast of Anglesey, Wales. The reserve is on sea cliffs facing the islet of South Stack, and is crossed by the Anglesey Coastal Path. There is an information centre based in Elin's Tower in the reserve.

It is best known for its breeding seabirds, including puffins, razorbills, guillemots, kittiwakes and fulmars. Rare choughs, peregrine falcons, and common kestrels also nest on the cliffs.

The area is also famous for attracting rare vagrant birds such as black lark in 2003 and grey catbird in 2001, as well as for its fascinating geology.

South Stack Cliffs RSPB reserve also helps to conserve the silver-studded blue butterfly Plebejus argus found on the reserve in Spring. The Spathulate fleawort, a subspecies of field fleawort, a small yellow flower, is only found here, in the whole world. Groups of Hebridean and Manx sheep help the RSPB to maintain the site.

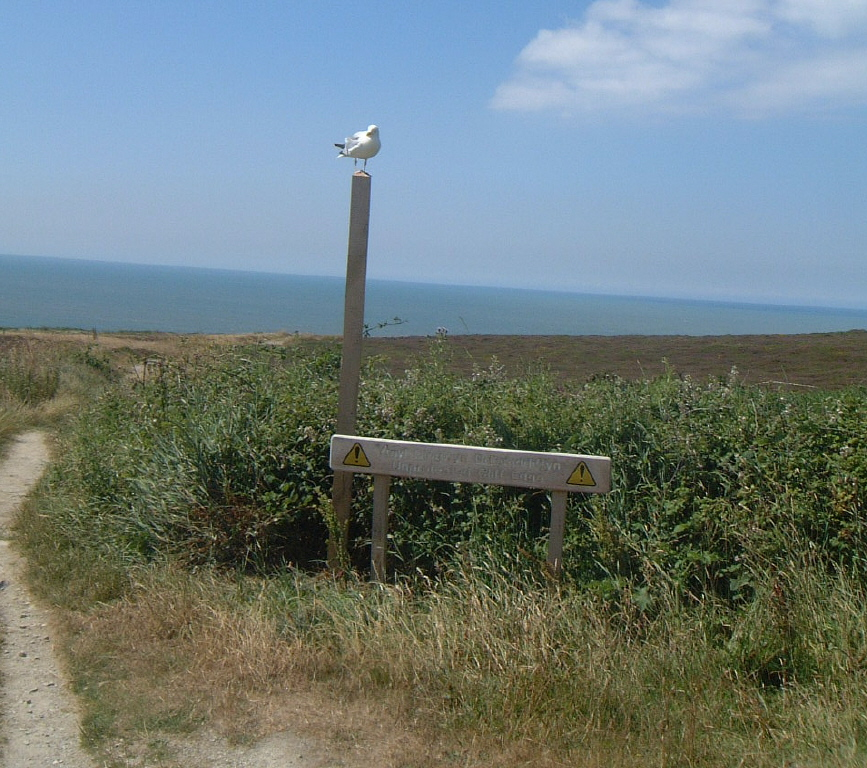
The reserve entrance, with herring gull

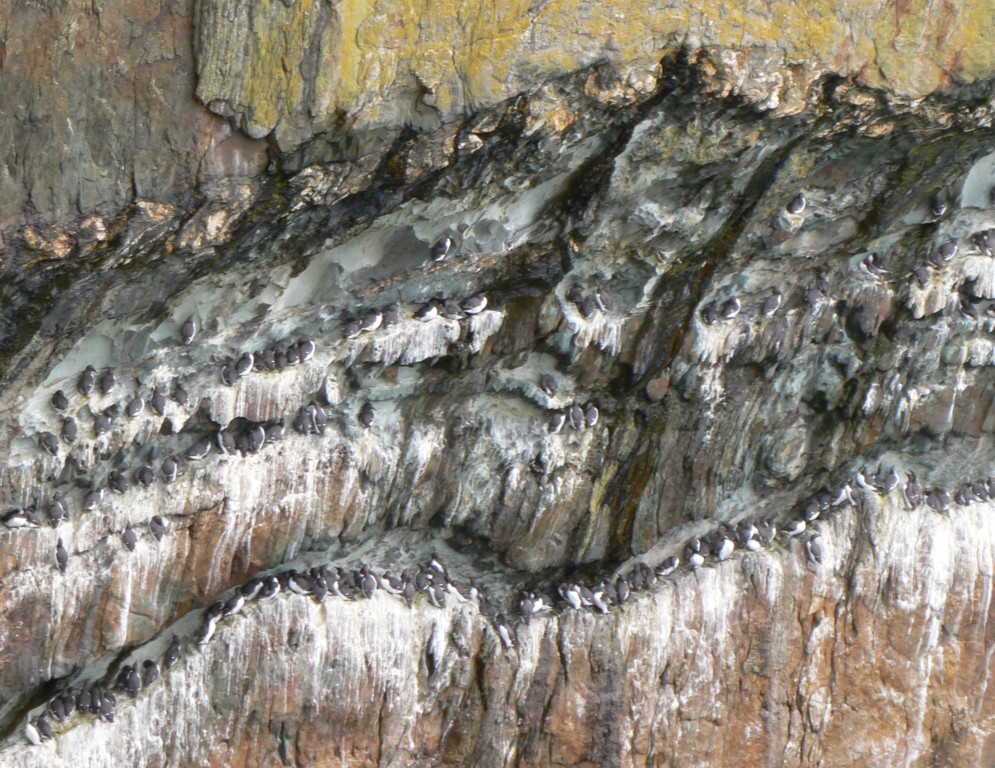
Guillemots on the breeding ledges
