= Yarley Meadows =

Site of Special Scientific Interest in Gloucestershire, England

- Site of Special Scientific Interest
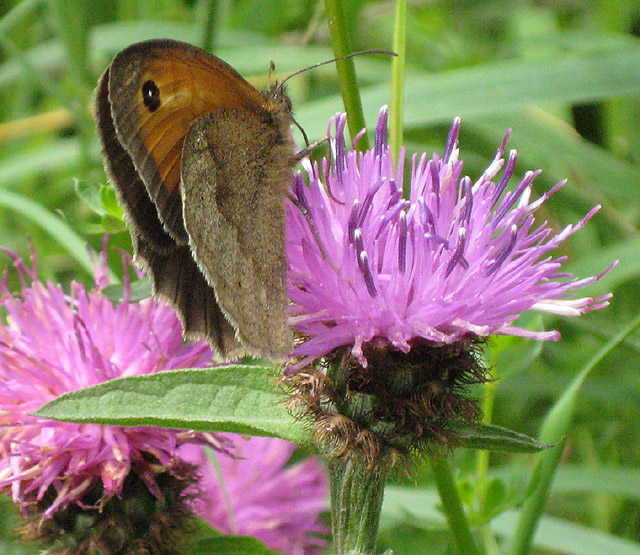
- Example - meadow brown butterfly (Maniola jurtina) on knapweed (Centaurea nigra)

- Location within Gloucestershire
- Location of Yarley Meadows.
- Area of search: Gloucestershire
- Grid reference: ST757888
- Coordinates: 51.597967°N 2.351496°W
- Interest: Biological
- Area: 12.2 ha (30 acres)
- Notification date: 1987

Yarley Meadows (grid reference ST757888) is a 12.2-hectare (30-acre) biological Site of Special Scientific Interest in Gloucestershire, England, notified in 1987.

== Location and habitat ==
The site, which consists of three fields, is in the south of Gloucestershire and is adjacent to Lower Woods which is also an SSSI. The meadows are unimproved neutral grassland. They are traditionally managed and support a diversity of species. Such grassland is now rare in the United Kingdom.

The meadows are on Jurassic and Cretaceous clays (Denchworth Series). They are waterlogged in the winter months and poorly drained. Mature hedges surround and breakup the meadows and there are ponds in two fields.

== Flora ==
The grass species include crested dog's-tail, sweet vernal-grass, Yorkshire fog, red fescue and quaking-grass. Sedge and rush are in abundance in the wetter parts of the fields and include glaucous sedge, hairy sedge, soft rush and hard rush.

Herbs include dyer's greenweed, saw-wort, adder's-tongue, common knapweed, betony and pepper saxifrage. Yellow-rattle, common spotted-orchid, sneezewort, cowslip and hoary plantain are also recorded.

== Invertebrates ==
The meadows support large numbers of butterflies such as meadow brown and gatekeeper.

== SSSI Source ==
- Natural England SSSI information on the citation
- Natural England SSSI information on the Yarley Meadows unit
