= Penrhos Country Park =

Country park in Anglesey, Wales

- Penrhos Coastal Park
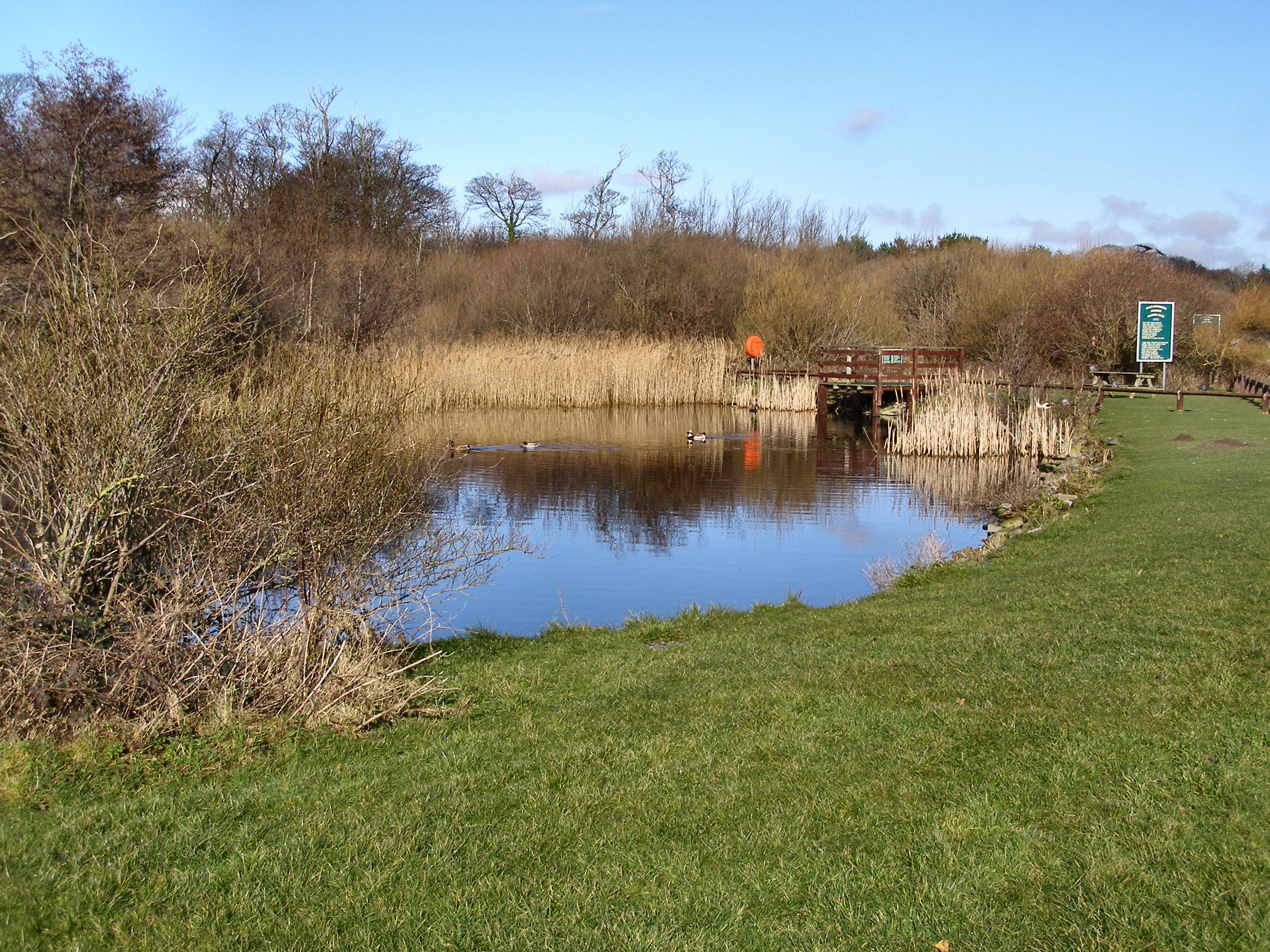

- Location within Wales
- Location: Near Holyhead, Anglesey, Wales
- Coordinates: 53°17′55″N 4°35′35″W
- Established: 1971
- Visitors: 100,000 (per year)
- Governing body: Isle of Anglesey County Council

Penrhos Country Park (also known as Penrhos Coastal Park) (grid reference SH2781) is a country park near Holyhead, on the island of Anglesey in Wales, United Kingdom. The park attracts approximately 100,000 visitors each year. Established by local animal lover, Ken Williams, it was opened in 1971 in association with the construction of Anglesey Aluminium, on the former Penrhos estate which was formerly owned by the Stanley family. It was officially opened by Prince Charles, Prince of Wales, in 1971.

It is adjacent to the A55, on the Anglesey Coastal Path and also adjoins Beddmanarch Bay. Parts of the park are a Site of Special Scientific Interest (SSSI) and Area of Outstanding Natural Beauty (AONB).

In 2016, Isle of Anglesey County Council gave planning permission to Land and Lakes for a holiday village development in the park. As mitigation, Land and Lakes would develop a nature reserve at nearby Cae Glas on former Anglesey Aluminium land. Part of the financial case for development is to provide accommodation for workers at any new nuclear development at Wylfa nuclear power station.

As of 2026 development had not started, and in May 2025 the owners of the land entered administration.

The park was voted "UK's Favourite Park 2022" in a poll organised by the charity Fields in Trust.
