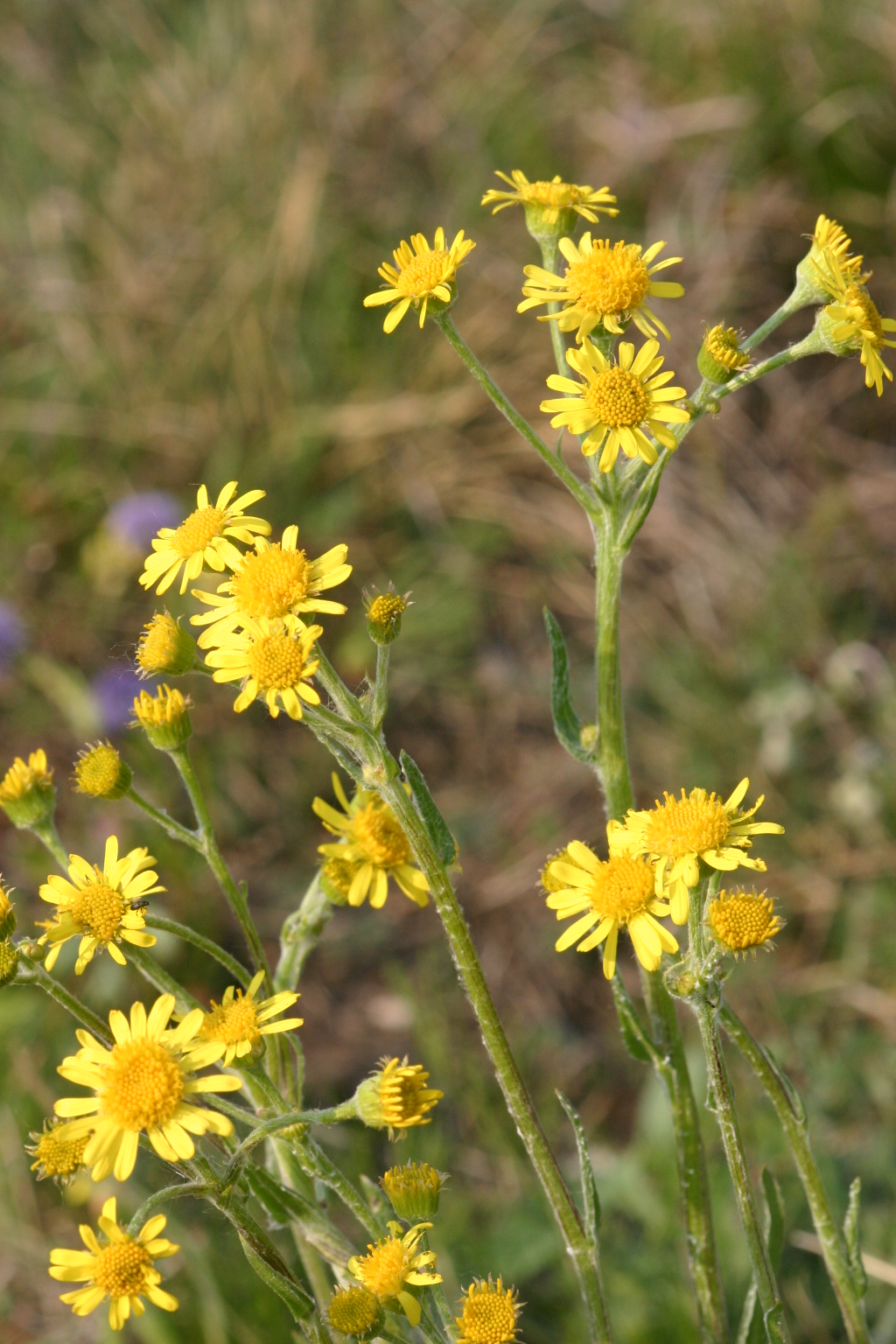

Scientific classification
- Kingdom: Plantae
- Clade: Tracheophytes
- Clade: Angiosperms
- Clade: Eudicots
- Clade: Asterids
- Order: Asterales
- Family: Asteraceae
- Genus: Tephroseris
- Species: T. integrifolia

Binomial name
- Tephroseris integrifolia (L.) Holub

= Tephroseris integrifolia =

Species of flowering plant

Tephroseris integrifolia (vernacular name: field fleawort) is a species of flowering plant belonging to the family Asteraceae.

Its native range is Europe to Siberia and Iran.

Synonym:

- Senecio integrifolius (L.) Clairv.

Subspecies: Tephroseris integrifolia subsp. maritima (Syme) B.Nord.
