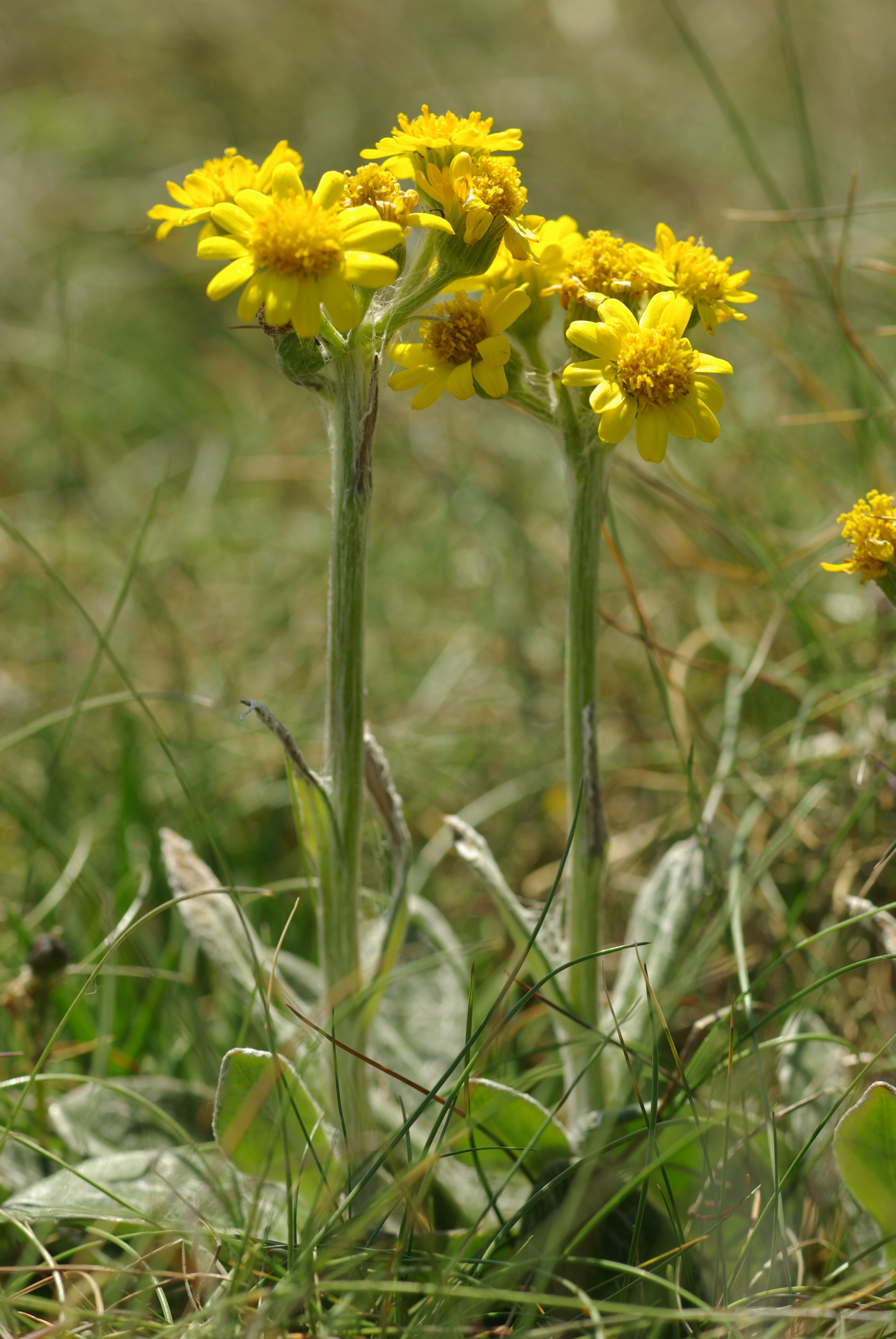

Scientific classification
- Kingdom: Plantae
- Clade: Tracheophytes
- Clade: Angiosperms
- Clade: Eudicots
- Clade: Asterids
- Order: Asterales
- Family: Asteraceae
- Genus: Tephroseris
- Species: T. integrifolia
- Subspecies: T. i. subsp. maritima

Trinomial name
- Tephroseris integrifolia subsp. maritima (Syme) B. Nord

Synonyms
- Senecio spathulifolius auct. non Griess.; Senecio integrifolius subsp. maritimus (Syme) Chater

= Tephroseris integrifolia subsp. maritima =

Subspecies of plant

Tephroseris integrifolia subsp. maritima, also known as the spathulate fleawort or South Stack fleawort, is endemic to Holyhead Island, occurring only around South Stack. It is a subspecies of the field fleawort Tephroseris integrifolia.

It is a single-stemmed plant, typically with more than six capitula (flower heads), which flowers between April and June.
