= Anglesey Aluminium =

Former aluminium smelting plant in Anglesey, Wales

Coordinates: 53.29634°N 4.596555°W

Anglesey Aluminium Metal Ltd.
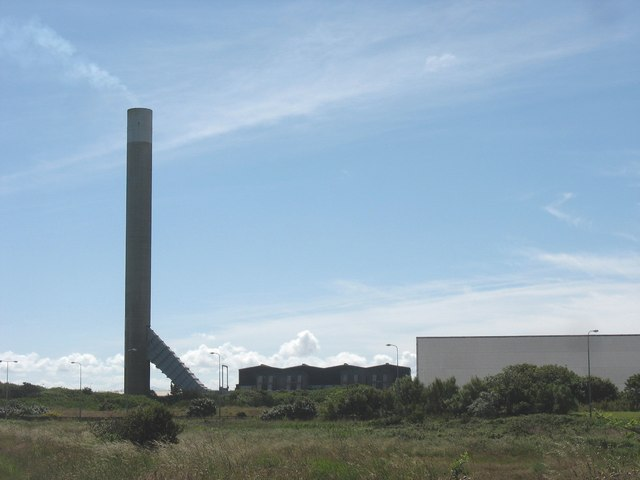
- The former chimney stack of Anglesey Aluminium
- Company type: Joint venture
- Defunct: 2013
- Headquarters: Holyhead, Wales
- Products: Aluminium
- Owner: Rio Tinto; Kaiser Aluminium

Anglesey Aluminium Metal Ltd. was a joint venture between Rio Tinto and Kaiser Aluminum. Its aluminium smelter, located on the outskirts of Holyhead, was one of the largest employers in North Wales, with 540 staff members, and began to produce aluminium in 1971. It was built on the Penrhos Estate, 500 acres (200 ha) of which were sold by the Stanley family for the project. Up until its closure it produced up to 142,000 tonnes of aluminium every year and was the biggest single user of electricity (255 MW) in the United Kingdom.

Alumina and coke shipped from Jamaica and Australia would berth at the company's private jetty in Holyhead harbour. This jetty is linked by a series of conveyor belts passing through tunnels to the plant. A spur rail link from the main North Wales Coast Line runs into the plant and was used for both receipt of raw materials and despatch of aluminium.

The plant was powered from the National Grid and received most of its electricity from Wylfa nuclear power station 15 miles (24 km) away. Anglesey Aluminium was used as a base load for Wylfa and saved the grid the cost of keeping a power station on standby. The power contract terminated in 2009, and the aluminium smelting operation was shut down as no new contract was negotiated. The aluminium re-melt facility initially remained open after the shut down of the smelter, but its closure was announced in February 2013. The company announced tentative plans for a biomass plant on the site, but smelting operations and the plant were mothballed and the plant was finally cleared in 2023 to prepare for redevelopment. On 20 March 2024, the site's 450-foot (140 m) tall chimney was demolished; the last of the visible structures of the aluminium smelting plant.

It was announced in September 2022 that the former Anglesey Aluminium site had been purchased by Stena Line, with their intention to use the site to facilitate an extension of Stena's existing operations of the Port of Holyhead. The sale included the spur rail line, the jetty in Holyhead harbour and the former conveyor tunnel linking the jetty to the main site.

Near the smelter the Aluminium Powder Company (ALPOCO) produces aluminium powder, which is used in pastes, pigments, chemicals, metallurgy, refractory, propulsion, pyrotechnics, spray deposition and powder metallurgy. Adjacent to the site is the public access Penrhos Country Park.

== See also ==
- British Aluminium
- Alcan Lynemouth Aluminium Smelter
- Lochaber hydroelectric scheme § Fort William Smelter
- List of aluminium smelters
- Penrhos Country Park
