= South Stack Formation =

Cambro-Ordovician geologic formation in Wales

- Stratigraphic range: Furongian-Tremadoc; ~497–477 Ma
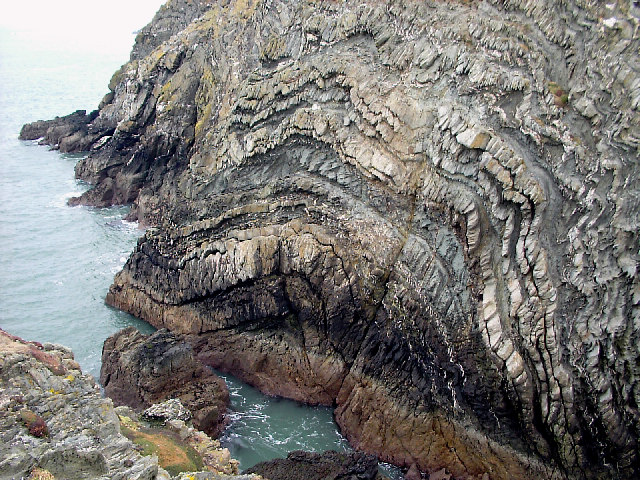
- Folded metamorphosed sandstones of the South Stack Formation
- Type: Geological formation
- Unit of: Holy Island Group
- Underlies: New Harbour Group
- Overlies: not exposed
- Thickness: ~360–1,000 m (1,180–3,280 ft)

Lithology
- Primary: Metamorphosed sandstone
- Other: Metamorphosed mudstone

Location
- Coordinates: 53°18′N 4°41′W
- Region: Holy Island, Anglesey
- Country: Wales

Type section
- Named for: South Stack
- South Stack Formation (the United Kingdom) South Stack Formation (Wales)

The South Stack Formation is a sequence of Cambro-Ordovician (Furongian to Tremadocian) metasedimentary rocks exposed in northwestern Anglesey, North Wales. The outcrop of this formation at South Stack was chosen as one of the top 100 geosites in the United Kingdom by the Geological Society of London, for its display of small-scale folding.

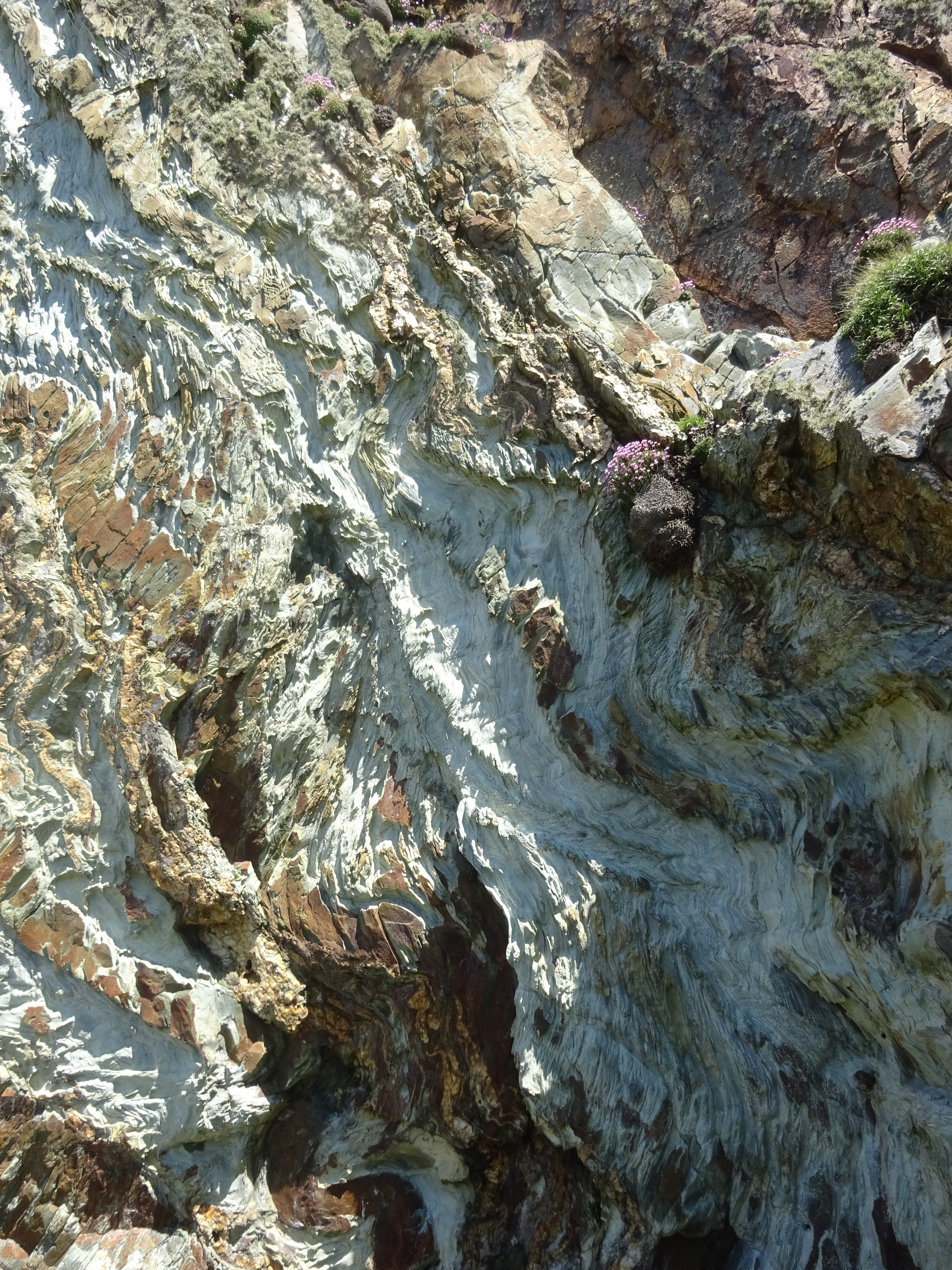
Closer view of the rock formation
