= Sinosenecio =

Scientific classification
- Kingdom: Plantae
- Clade: Tracheophytes
- Clade: Angiosperms
- Clade: Eudicots
- Clade: Asterids
- Order: Asterales
- Family: Asteraceae
- Subfamily: Asteroideae
- Tribe: Senecioneae
- Genus: Sinosenecio; B.Nord.

Genus of plants

Sinosenecio, commonly known as butterweed, is a genus of Asian plants in the groundsel tribe within the daisy family. Most of the species are found only in China, with a few extending southward into Indochina.

Species

- Sinosenecio bodinieri
- Sinosenecio changii
- Sinosenecio chienii
- Sinosenecio cortusifolius
- Sinosenecio cyclaminifolius
- Sinosenecio dryas
- Sinosenecio eriopodus
- Sinosenecio euosmus
- Sinosenecio fangianus
- Sinosenecio fanjingshanicus
- Sinosenecio globiger
- Sinosenecio guangxiensis
- Sinosenecio guizhouensis
- Sinosenecio hainanensis
- Sinosenecio hederifolius
- Sinosenecio homogyniphyllus
- Sinosenecio hunanensis
- Sinosenecio jiuhuashanicus
- Sinosenecio latouchei
- Sinosenecio leiboensis
- Sinosenecio ligularioides
- Sinosenecio oldhamianus
- Sinosenecio palmatilobus
- Sinosenecio palmatisectus
- Sinosenecio phalacrocarpoides
- Sinosenecio phalacrocarpus
- Sinosenecio rotundifolius
- Sinosenecio saxatilis
- Sinosenecio septilobus
- Sinosenecio subcoriaceus
- Sinosenecio subrosulatus
- Sinosenecio sungpanensis
- Sinosenecio trinervius
- Sinosenecio villifer
- Sinosenecio wuyiensis

formerly included

see Tephroseris

- Sinosenecio koreanus - Tephroseris koreana
- Sinosenecio newcombei - Tephroseris newcombei
