= South Stack Lighthouse =

Lighthouse in Anglesey, Wales

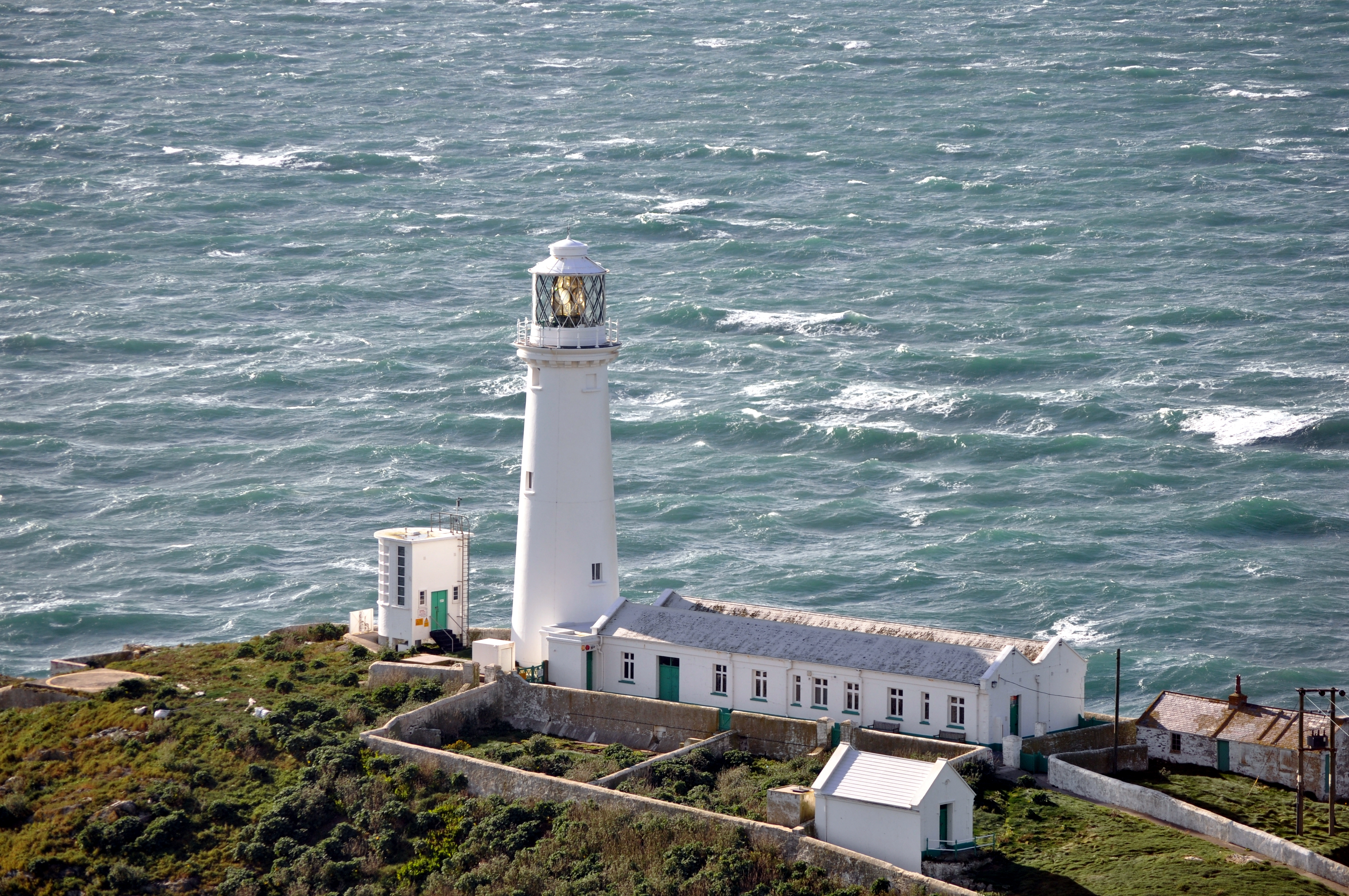
- South Stack Lighthouse in 2012
- Location: Holy Island, Anglesey, Wales
- Coordinates: 53°18′24″N 4°41′58″W

Tower
- Constructed: 1809
- Construction: Stone tower
- Automated: 1983
- Height: 28 m (92 ft)
- Shape: Tapered cylindrical tower with balcony and lantern
- Markings: White tower and lantern
- Operator: Trinity House
- Heritage: Grade II listed building, National Monument of Wales
- Fog signal: one 3s. blast every 30s. (range of 2 nmi (3.7 km; 2.3 mi))

Light
- Focal height: 60 m (200 ft)
- Lens: 1st order six panel catadioptric rotating
- Intensity: 467,000 candela
- Range: 24 nmi (44 km; 28 mi)
- Characteristic: Fl W 10s.

The South Stack Lighthouse is built on the summit of a small island off the north-west coast of Holy Island, Anglesey, Wales. It was built in 1809 to warn ships of the dangerous rocks below.

== History ==
The lighthouse has warned passing ships of the treacherous rock below since its completion in 1809. The 91-foot (28 m)-tall lighthouse on South Stack was designed by Daniel Alexander and the main light is visible to passing vessels for 24 nmi (44 km; 28 mi), and was designed to allow safe passage for ships on the treacherous Dublin–Holyhead–Liverpool sea route. It provides the first beacon along the northern coast of Anglesey for east-bound ships. It is followed by lighthouses, fog horns and other markers at North Stack, Holyhead Breakwater, The Skerries, the Mice, Point Lynas and at the south-east tip of the island Trwyn Du. The lighthouse is operated remotely by Trinity House. It has been visited by the team at Most Haunted.

Visitors can climb to the top of the lighthouse and tour the engine room and exhibition area. The lighthouse is open seasonally.

== See also ==
- List of lighthouses in Wales
