= South Stack =

Island off northwest Anglesey, Wales

Ynys Lawd (Welsh)
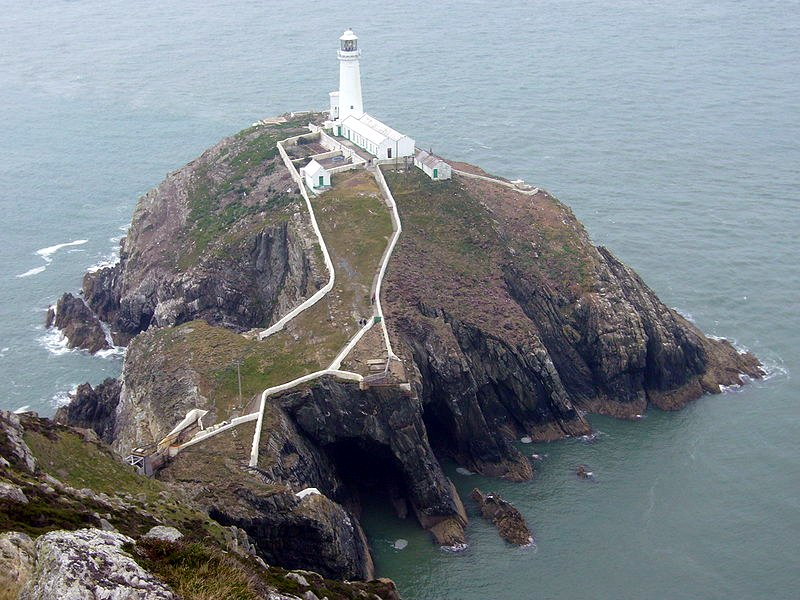
- South Stack Lighthouse

- Location with Anglesey

Geography
- Location: Irish Sea near Holyhead, Anglesey
- Coordinates: 53°18′24.40″N 4°41′56.91″W
- Length: 0.15 mi (0.24 km)
- Width: 0.1 mi (0.2 km)
- Highest point: 134 ft (41 m)

South Stack (Welsh: Ynys Lawd) is an island situated just off Holy Island on the northwest coast of Anglesey, Wales.

== Geology ==
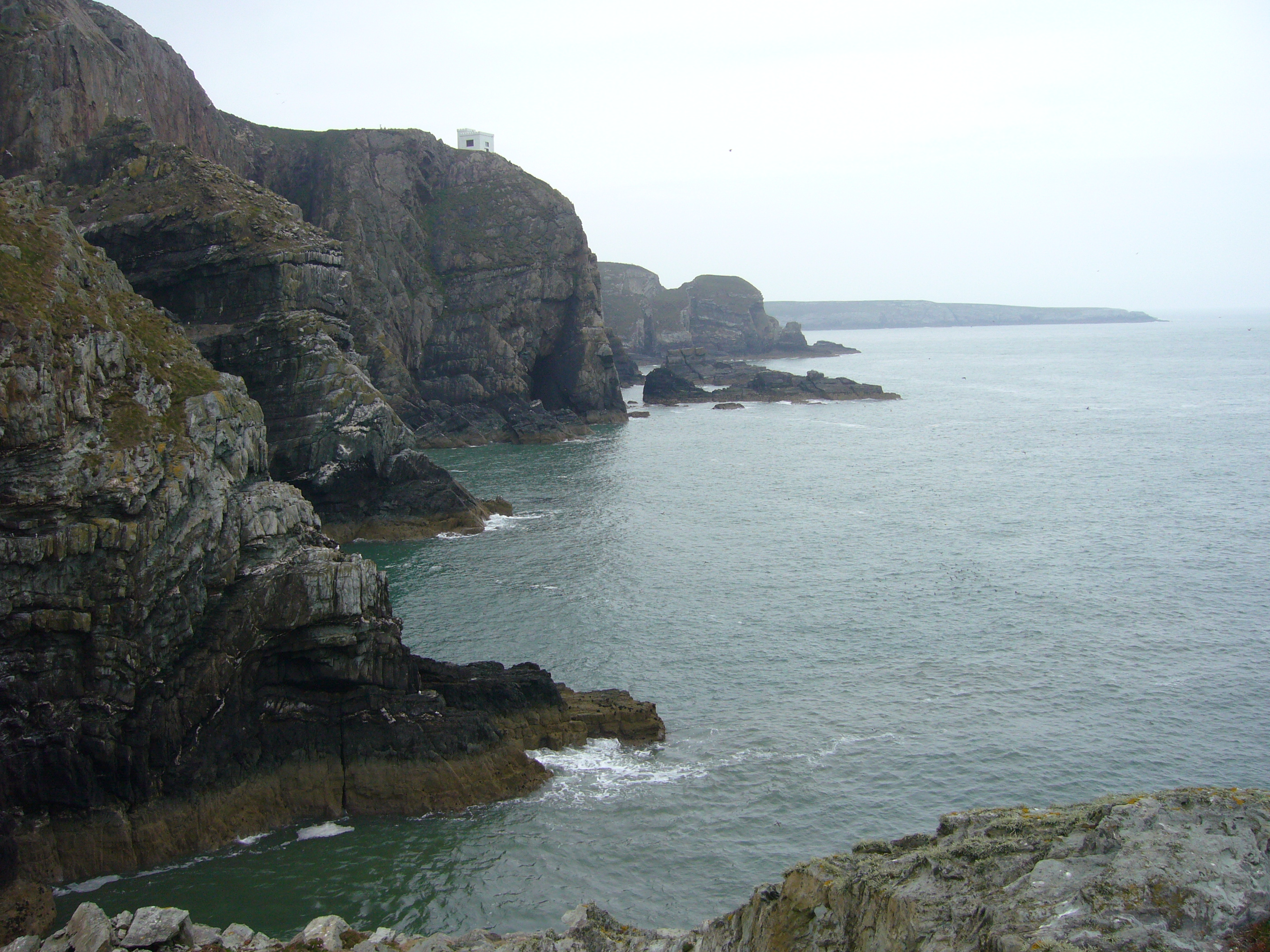
Folding in the South Stack Formation can be seen in the rocks of the mainland's sea cliffs.

South Stack is an island known as a sea stack. It was formed by the wave erosion of sedimentary rocks that once connected the island to the mainland.

The area is known geologically as the South Stack Formation. Its strata includes sandstones and interbedded shales which have been contorted by large folds and crumples. The folds can be seen in the seacliffs (best viewed from the steps leading down to the lighthouse). Thick beds of pure Holyhead Quartzite, which forms the bulk of Holyhead Mountain, lie above these folded sedimentary rocks. Similar evidence of upthrusts can be seen in the cliffs to the south of South Stack.

The geology of South Stack has been chosen as one of the top 100 geosites in the United Kingdom by Geological Society of London, for its display of small-scale folding.

== Lighthouse ==
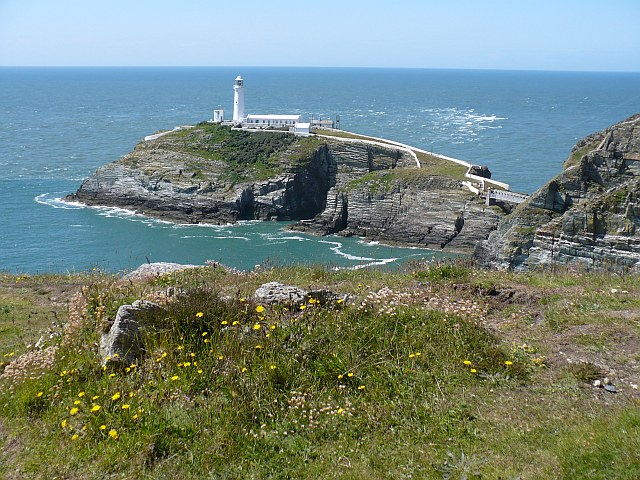
South Stack Lighthouse, which was first built in the early 19th century, is connected to the mainland via a footbridge.

South Stack Lighthouse, which was completed in 1809, is sited 41 metres (135 ft) above the sea on South Stack. Its lamp tower is 28 m (92 ft)-tall and the lighthouse complex covers seven acres (2.8 ha). There are over 390 stone steps and 10 metal steps down to the footbridge.

Originally the only way to cross to the island was in a basket suspended from a hemp cable. In 1828, an iron suspension bridge was built; it was replaced in 1964 with a steel cable truss bridge. However, in 1983 it had to be closed to the public due to safety concerns. After a new aluminium bridge was built, the lighthouse was reopened to the public in 1997. It has become a popular destination, attracting thousands of visitors every year.

== Nature reserve ==
The island's cliffs are part of the South Stack Cliffs RSPB reserve and home to an estimated 8,000 nesting birds during the breeding season. An RSPB visitor centre (with bird hide) is located at Elin's Tower on the mainland. Birds and marine life seen from the centre include choughs, peregrine falcons, and kestrels as well as harbour porpoises, grey seals, Risso's dolphins and bottlenose dolphins.

=== Tidal energy project ===
In 2019, proposals to develop a 35 km^{2} (14 mi^{2}) 'West Anglesey Demonstration Zone' tidal energy project at South Stack were submitted under the Transport and Works Act 1992 to the Welsh Government for planning consent. Consent for the project, called Morlais was awarded in December 2021 and construction of the onshore grid connection works took place in 2023.

As the development will come within 500 metres (1,600 ft) of the South Stack SSSI, concerns have been expressed about the visual impact on the Anglesey Area of Outstanding Natural Beauty and the Holyhead Mountain Heritage Coast, along with the resultant impact on the tourism, recreation and fishing sectors. The developers have identified that seabird and mammal populations would be affected within the Holy Island Coast Special Area of Conservation and Special Protection Area along with the North Anglesey Marine Special Area of Conservation. Most notably, bottlenose dolphin and harbour porpoise would likely be affected, whilst razorbill and common guillemot will be severely impacted. The RSPB is concerned that the razorbill colony on South Stack could be wiped out.

== Walking trails ==
Part of the Anglesey Coastal Path, which is a 200-kilometre (124 mi) long-distance footpath around the island of Anglesey, passes South Stack. The Cybi Circular Walk around Holyhead Mountain has long and short variants; the short walk is four miles (6.4 km) long and takes around two hours to complete. Travelling from the Breakwater Country Park, other sites along the way are the North Stack Fog Signal station, Caer y Tŵr, and Tŷ Mawr Hut Circles.

== Media ==
South Stack's natural beauty has been used in photography and literature. The cover photo for Roxy Music's Siren album, featuring model Jerry Hall, was taken directly below the central span of the bridge on a slope on the south side, by Graham Hughes in August 1975. In 2010, a French comic entitled Les Gardiens des Enfers (The Guardians of Hell) was published. Its story is mainly set in South Stack lighthouse in 1859. The cover and the first pages can be seen on the publisher's website.

== See also ==
- South Stack fleawort (Tephroseris integrifolia subsp. maritima), a plant endemic to the area around South Stack
