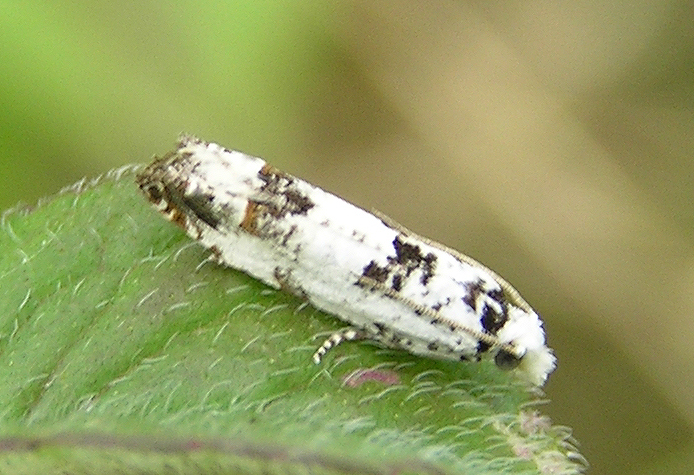
- Eucosma campoliliana

Scientific classification
- Domain: Eukaryota
- Kingdom: Animalia
- Phylum: Arthropoda
- Class: Insecta
- Order: Lepidoptera
- Family: Tortricidae
- Tribe: Eucosmini
- Genus: Eucosma; Hübner, 1823

Species
- Many, see text

Synonyms
- Affa Walker, 1863; Ascelodes T. B. Fletcher, 1929; Calosetia Stainton, 1859; Catoptria Guenee, 1845; Exentera Grote, 1877; Exenterella Grote, 1883; Palpocrinia Kennel, 1919; Pygolopha Lederer, 1859

= Eucosma =

Genus of tortrix moths

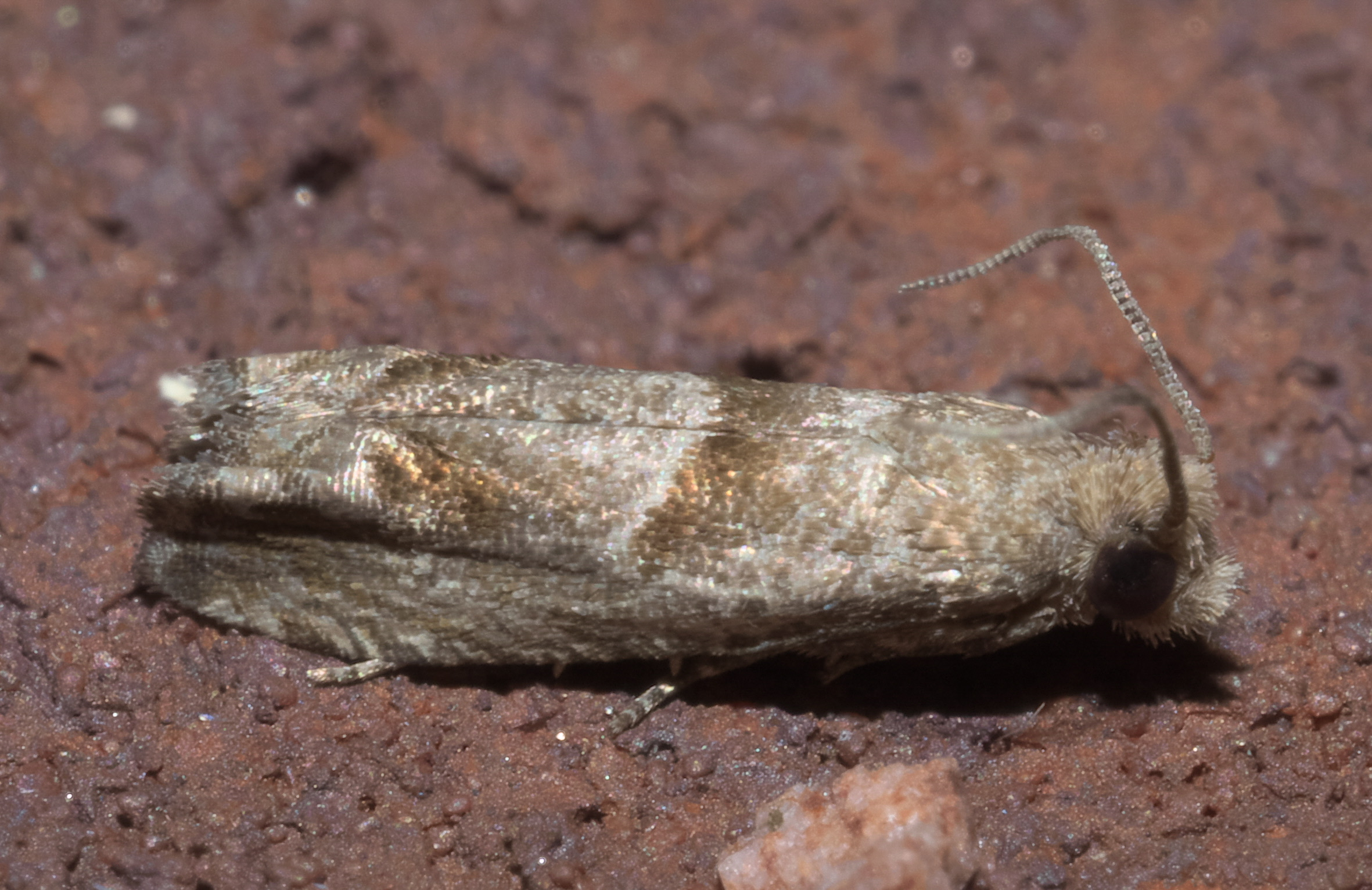
Eucosma apacheana

Eucosma is a very large genus of moths belonging to the family Tortricidae. Some taxonomies place a number of species in the genus Eucopina (e. g.: E. bobana, E. cocana, E. tocullionana). The genus has a Holarctic and Indomalayan distribution (some Afrotropical species originally described in this genus have since been reassigned to other genera). Even in well-studied Europe and North America, new species are still regularly discovered (Nomina Insecta Nearctica lists 150 Nearctic species and Fauna Europaea lists 53 European species). There are at least 670 described species in Eucosma worldwide.

These are small moths in a wide variety of colours, sometimes plain, sometimes with bold patterning.

== See also ==
- List of Eucosma species
