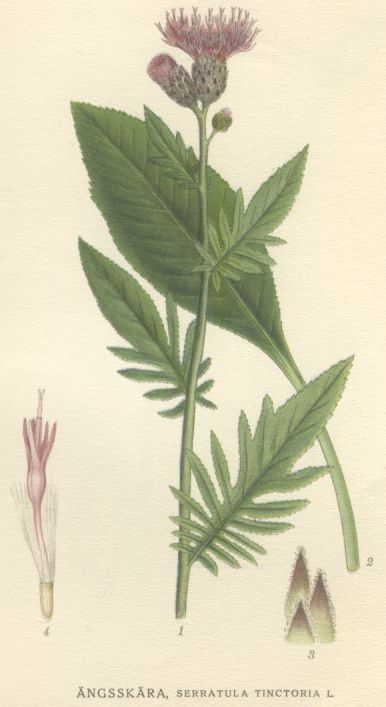

Scientific classification
- Kingdom: Plantae
- Clade: Tracheophytes
- Clade: Angiosperms
- Clade: Eudicots
- Clade: Asterids
- Order: Asterales
- Family: Asteraceae
- Genus: Serratula
- Species: S. tinctoria

Binomial name
- Serratula tinctoria L.

= Serratula tinctoria =

Species of plant

Serratula tinctoria, commonly known as dyer's plumeless saw-wort or saw-wort, is a species of flowering plant in the family Asteraceae.

== Description ==
Saw-wort is a spineless hairless perennial herb with wiry branched erect grooved stems. It usually grows 20 – 80 cm tall. The long hairless leaves measure 12 – 20 cm long and have finely bristle-toothed edges. The leaves, which are arranged alternately along the stem, vary in shape and dimensions, ranging from undivided and lanceolate to deeply pinnatifid with narrow lobes. Only the lower leaves are stalked

The stalked thistle-like flowerheads are 1.5 – 2 cm long and arranged in loose leafy inflorescences. The 5-lobed florets are reddish purple, the involucre is narrow oblong. The purplish bracts are appressed to the stem, being oval and pointed and not spiny. The achenes have a simple feathery yellowish pappus.

== Etymology and taxonomy ==
The specific epithet "tinctoria" is derived from a Latin word meaning "used for dyeing or staining". This name refers to its source of yellow dye that was previously used until the 19th century.

Chromosome number has been confirmed as 2n = 22.

== Ecology and habitat ==
S. tinctoria grows in various soil types overlying a range of rock types but is almost always confined to semi-natural vegetation in habitats with low levels of soil fertility and disturbance. It typically favours moist soils with full sun to partial shade, growing in grasslands, mires, open woodland, and scrub as well as their ecotones.

== Distribution ==
The species is found throughout much of England and Wales but is very rare in Scotland. It was first recorded from Ireland in New Ross, County Wexford in 1925, but has not been seen there since 1952. The European range extends as far north as southern Sweden and Norway, but the plant is absent from much of the Boreal Zone (northern Poland, Russia, Fennoscandia, and the Baltic States) and the lowland Mediterranean.

S. tinctoria has declined in Britain since at least the 19th century, primarily through a combination of drainage, ploughing and agricultural improvement as well as lack of management by cutting and grazing in grassland.

This is an introduced plant in a small area of the north-eastern United States.

== Uses ==
The leaves of Serratula tinctoria are the source of a yellow dye. As a herbal preparation, the plant was thought to mend ruptures and wounds.

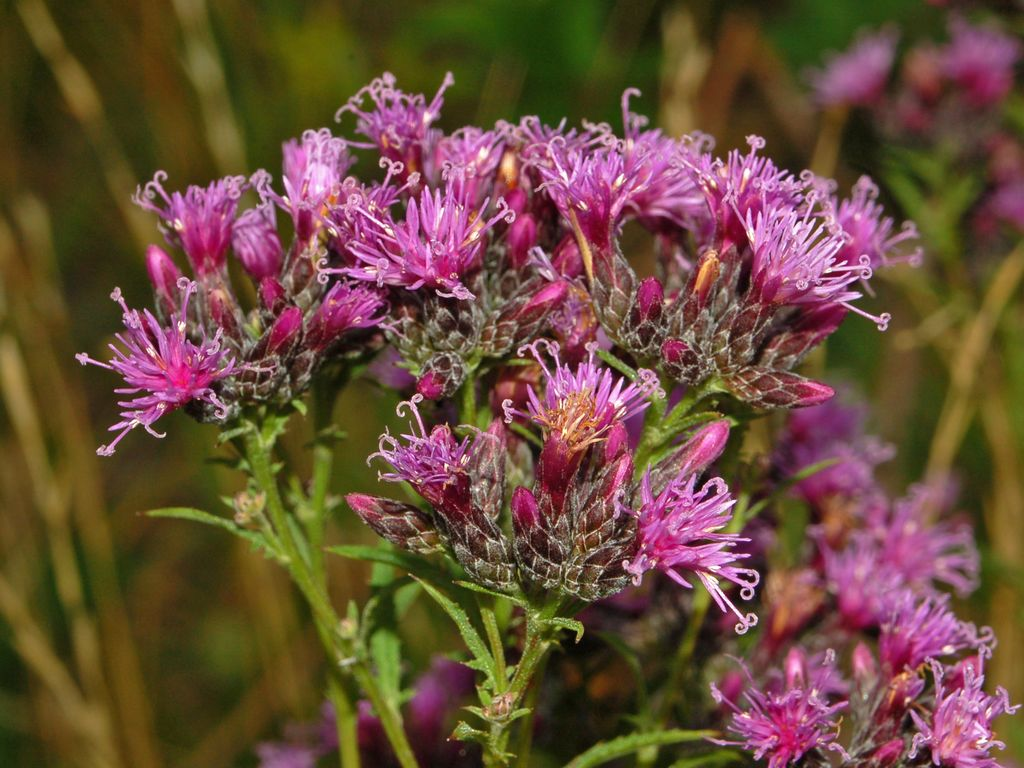

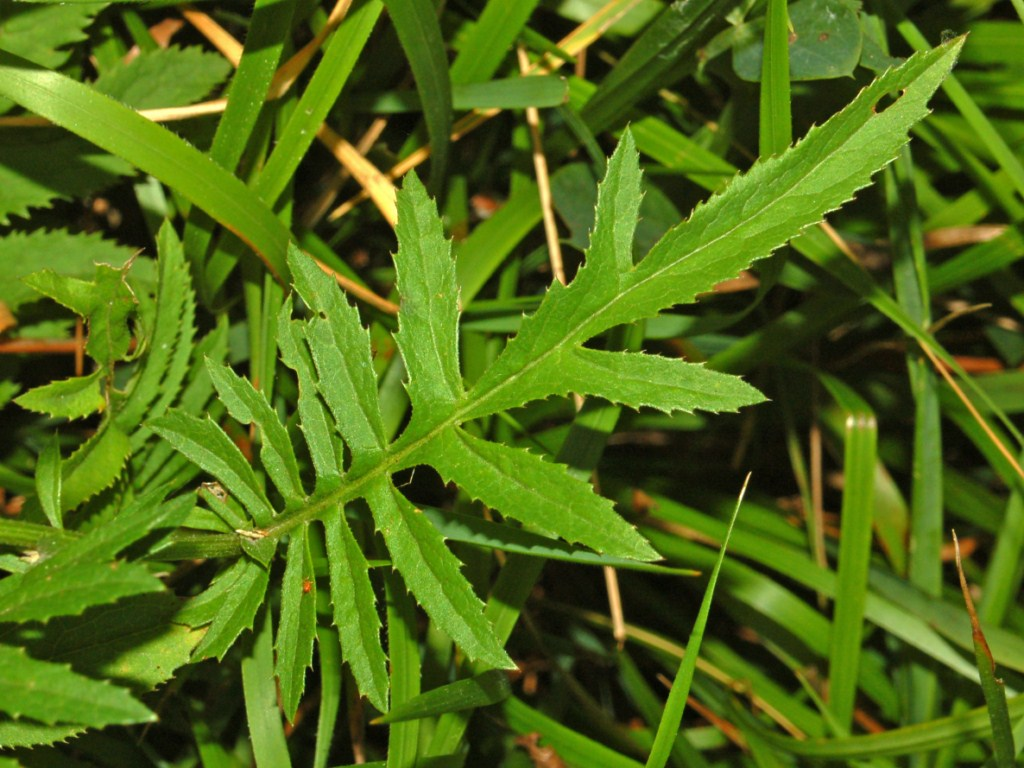

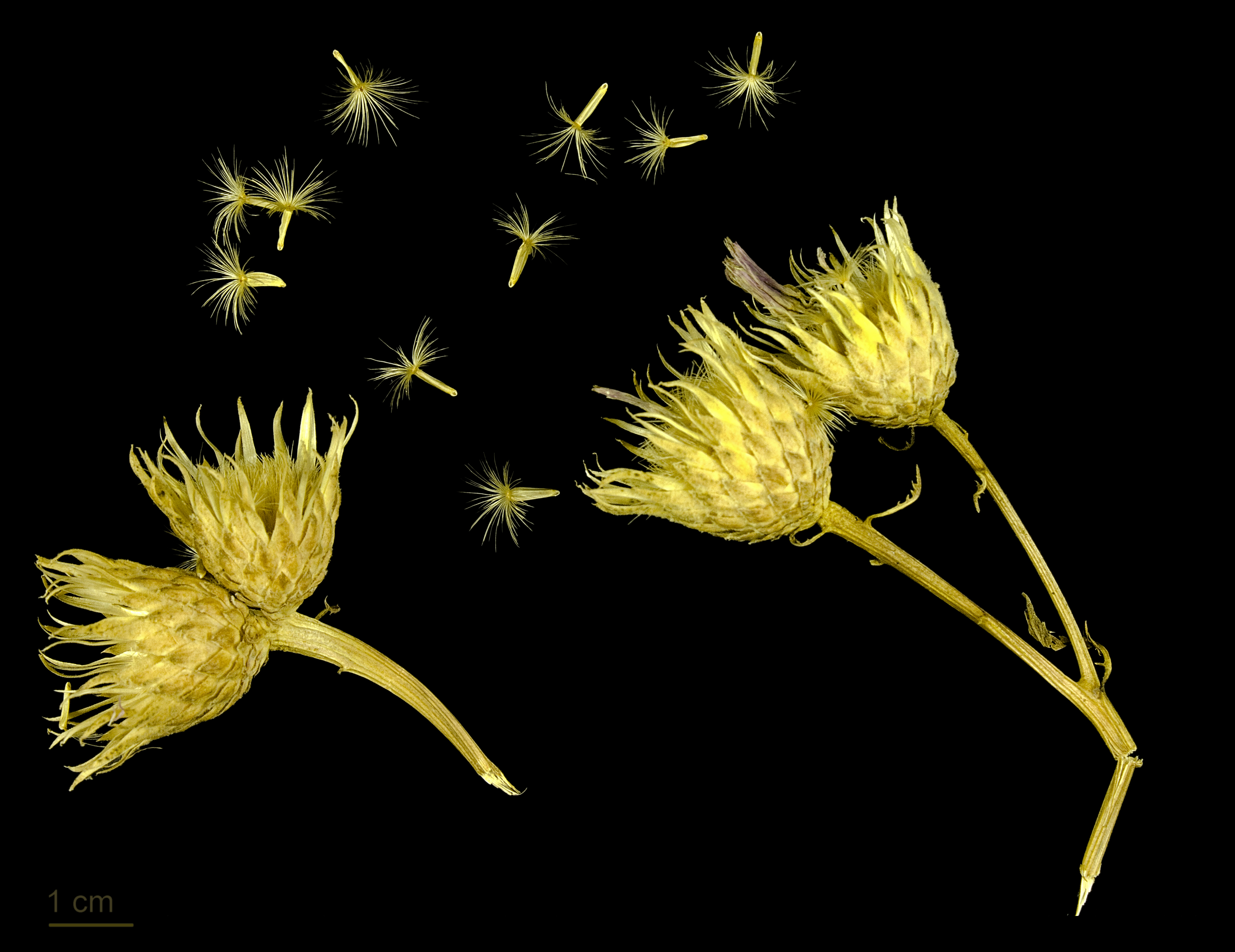
