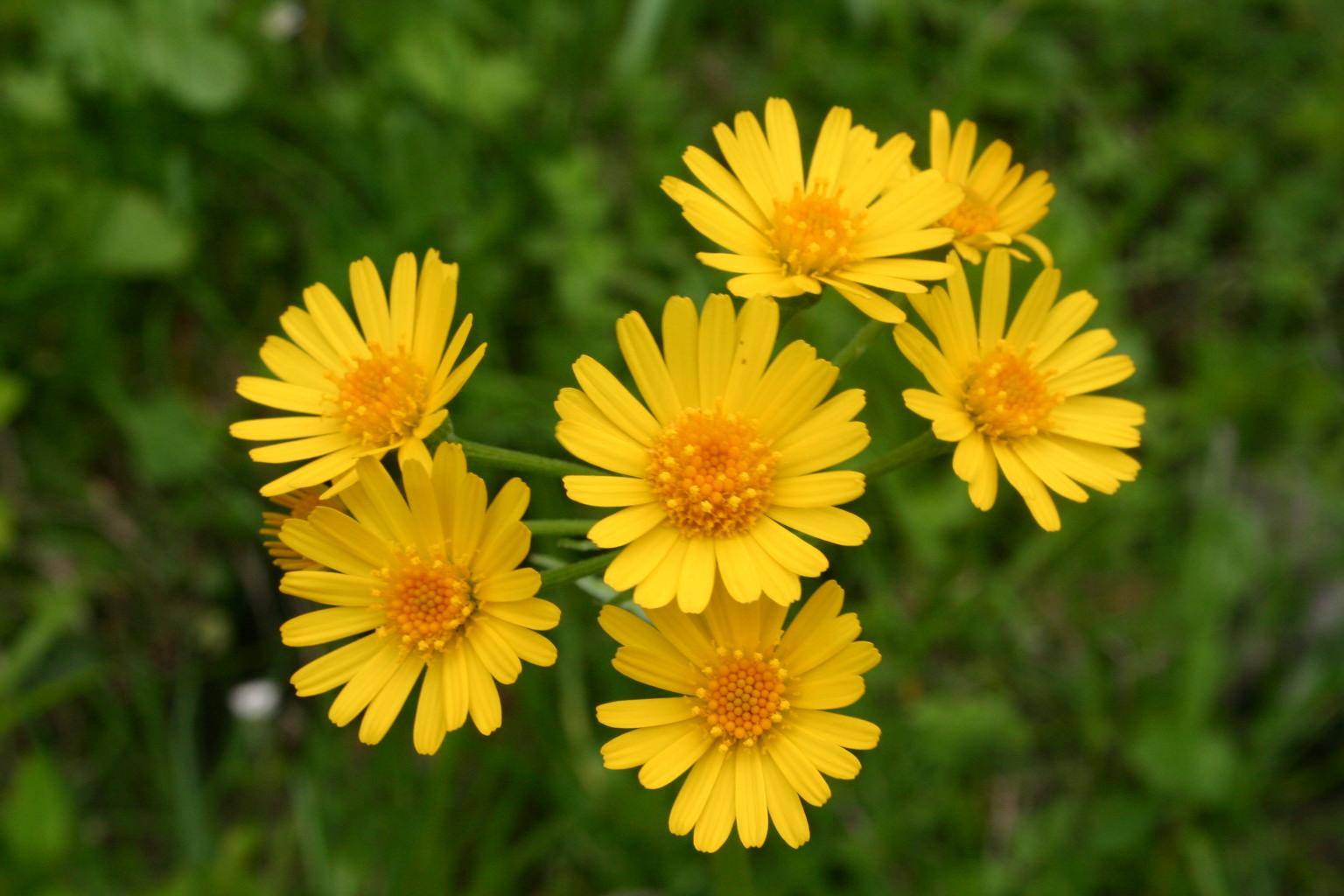
- Tephroseris crispa

Scientific classification
- Kingdom: Plantae
- Clade: Tracheophytes
- Clade: Angiosperms
- Clade: Eudicots
- Clade: Asterids
- Order: Asterales
- Family: Asteraceae
- Subfamily: Asteroideae
- Tribe: Senecioneae
- Genus: Tephroseris (Rchb.) Rchb.

Synonyms
- Heloseris Rchb. ex Steud.

= Tephroseris =

Genus of flowering plants

Tephroseris is a genus of Eurasian and North American plants in the groundsel tribe within the daisy family.

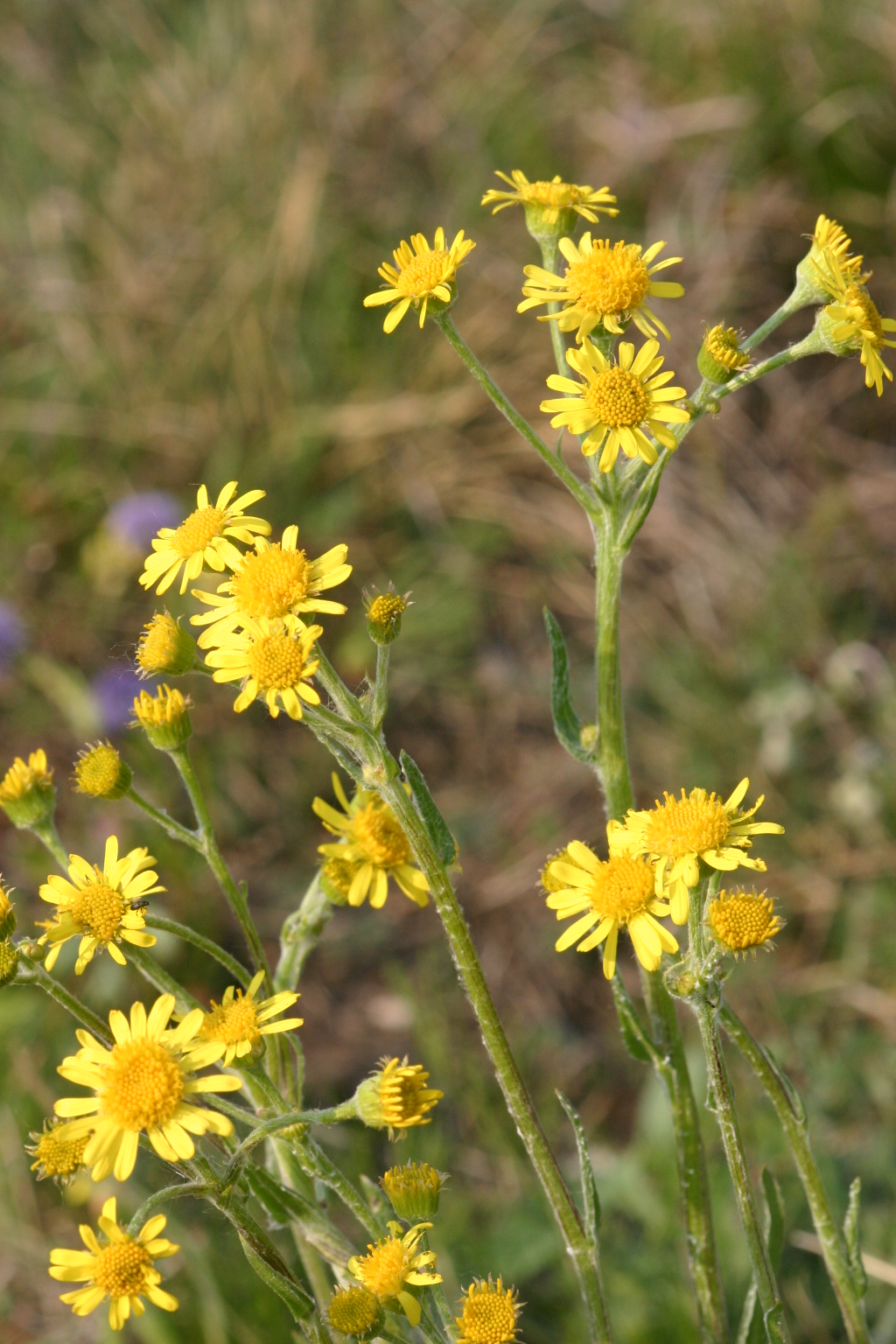
Tephroseris integrifolia
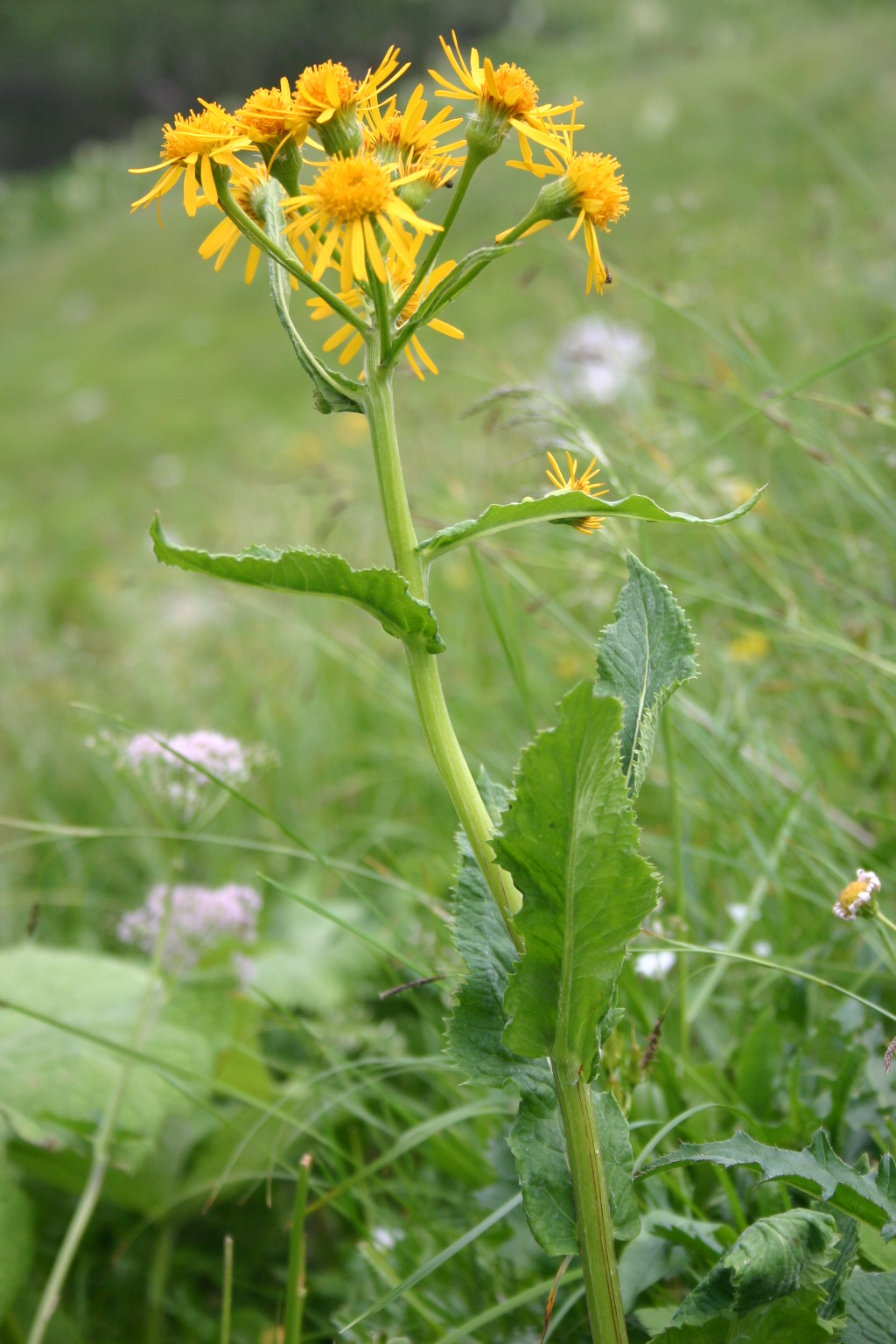
Tephroseris crispa

The following species are recognised in the genus Tephroseris:

- Tephroseris adenolepis C.Jeffrey & Y.L.Chen
- Tephroseris × arctisibirica (Jurtzev & Korobkov) Czerep.
- Tephroseris balbisiana (DC.) Holub
- Tephroseris cladobotrys Griseb. & Schenk
- Tephroseris crassifolia Griseb. & Schenk
- Tephroseris crispa (Jacq.) Rchb.
- Tephroseris flammea (DC.) Holub
- Tephroseris frigida (Richardson) Holub
- Tephroseris furusei (Kitam.) B.Nord.
- Tephroseris gurensis Barkalov
- Tephroseris helenitis (L.) B.Nord.
- Tephroseris hieraciiformis (Kom.) Barkalov
- Tephroseris integrifolia (L.) Holub
- Tephroseris jacutica (Schischk.) Holub
- Tephroseris kawakamii (Makino) Holub
- Tephroseris kirilowii (Turcz. ex DC.) Holub
- Tephroseris kjellmanii (A.E.Porsild) Holub
- Tephroseris koreana (Kom.) B.Nord. & Pelser
- Tephroseris lindstroemii (Ostenf.) Á.Löve & D.Löve
- Tephroseris longifolia (Jacq.) Griseb. & Schenk
- Tephroseris newcombei (Greene) B.Nord. & Pelser
- Tephroseris ochotensis Barkalov
- Tephroseris palustris (L.) Schrenk ex Rchb.
- Tephroseris papposa (Rchb.) Schur
- Tephroseris phaeantha (Nakai) C.Jeffrey & Y.L.Chen
- Tephroseris pierotii (Miq.) Holub
- Tephroseris porphyrantha (Schischk.) Holub
- Tephroseris praticola (Schischk. & Serg.) Holub
- Tephroseris pricei (N.D.Simpson) Holub
- Tephroseris pseudoaurantiaca (Kom.) Czerep.
- Tephroseris pseudosonchus (Vaniot) C.Jeffrey & Y.L.Chen
- Tephroseris pyroglossa (Kar. & Kir.) Holub
- Tephroseris rufa (Hand.-Mazz.) B.Nord.
- Tephroseris schistosa (Kharkev.) Barkalov
- Tephroseris sichotensis (Kom.) Holub
- Tephroseris stolonifera (Cufod.) Holub
- Tephroseris subdentata (Bunge) Holub
- Tephroseris subfrigida (Kom.) Holub
- Tephroseris subscaposa (Kom.) Czerep.
- Tephroseris sukaczevii (Schischk.) Holub
- Tephroseris taitoensis (Hayata) Holub
- Tephroseris takedana (Kitam.) Holub
- Tephroseris turczaninovii (DC.) Holub
- Tephroseris vereszczaginii (Schischk. & Serg.) Holub
- Tephroseris yukonensis (A.E.Porsild) Holub
