= List of Vanessa Redgrave performances =

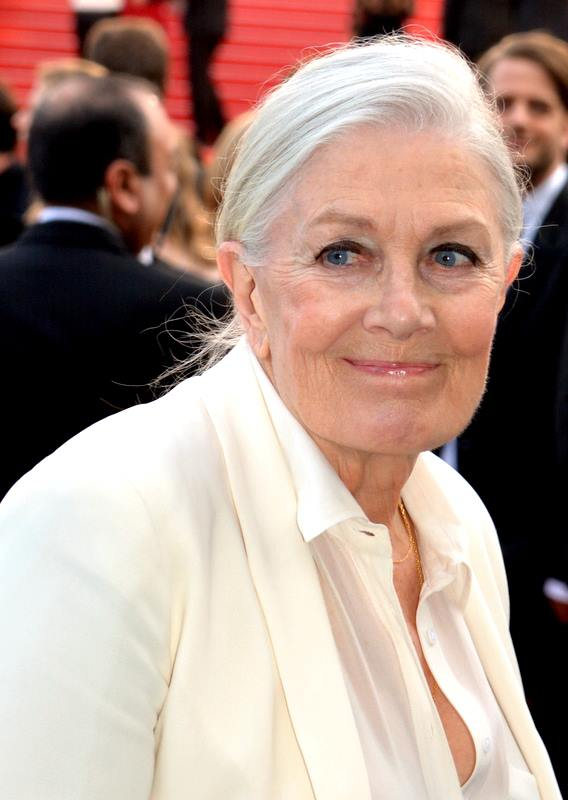
Dame Vanessa Redgrave at the 2016 Cannes Film Festival.

Vanessa Redgrave is an English actress whose career has spanned over six decades. She began her career in theater before making her feature film debut in Behind the Mask (1958), before starring in the Italian thriller Blowup (1966), and the comedy Morgan – A Suitable Case for Treatment (also 1966), the latter of which earned her her first Academy Award nomination (in the category of Best Actress), as well as a BAFTA nomination. Redgrave subsequently starred in the musical Camelot (1967), before portraying American dancer Isadora Duncan in the biopic Isadora (1968), which earned her a second Academy Award nomination. Her portrayal of the title character in 1971's Mary, Queen of Scots earned Redgrave a third Academy Award nomination. The same year, she appeared in Ken Russell's controversial historical drama-horror film The Devils.

Redgrave garnered widespread praise for her leading role in the drama Julia (1977), opposite Jane Fonda, for which she won her first Academy Award, in the category of Best Supporting Actress, as well as a Golden Globe award. She followed this with the title character of Agatha (1979), a biopic of writer Agatha Christie, before starring in The Bostonians (1984), a James Ivory-directed adaptation of the 1886 novel of the same name by American writer Henry James; this role earned Redgrave her fifth Academy Award nomination. She subsequently starred as the transgender tennis player Renée Richards in the television film Second Serve (1986), which earned her her seventh Golden Globe nomination.

In 1990, Redgrave starred in a film version of Tennessee Williams's Orpheus Descending, reprising the role she had played on Broadway, both under the direction of Peter Hall. She followed this with a lead role opposite her sister, Lynn, in a television film version of What Ever Happened to Baby Jane...?, and also appeared in a leading role in the independent drama The Ballad of the Sad Café (both 1991). She received a sixth Academy Award nomination for her role in Howards End (1992), an adaptation of the 1910 E. M. Forster novel of the same name. Through the 1990s, Redgrave appeared in a number of mainstream American films, including the thriller Mother's Boys (1993), Brian De Palma's action spy film Mission: Impossible (1996), Deep Impact (1998), and the period drama Girl, Interrupted (1999). She subsequently earned further acclaim for her role in the lesbian-themed anthology film If These Walls Could Talk 2 (2000), for which she won a Golden Globe for Best Supporting Actress in a Television Film.

Redgrave continued to appear in supporting parts, including the Sean Penn-directed thriller The Pledge (2001), the television Lord Byron biopic Byron (2003), and the dramas Evening (2007) and Atonement (2007). From 2004 to 2009, Redgrave had a recurring guest role on the television series Nip/Tuck, portraying Dr. Erica Noughton. In the 2010s, she appeared in supporting roles in several critically acclaimed studio films, such as Lee Daniels's The Butler (2013), Foxcatcher (2014), and Film Stars Don't Die in Liverpool (2017).

== Film ==
Year	Title	Role	Director(s)	Notes	Ref.
1958	Behind the Mask	Pamela Gray	Brian Desmond Hurst		
1966	Blow-Up	Jane	Michelangelo Antonioni		
1966	A Man for All Seasons	Anne Boleyn	Fred Zinnemann		
1966	Morgan – A Suitable Case for Treatment	Leonie Delt	Karel Reisz	Academy Award for Best Actress nomination	
1967	Camelot	Guinevere	Joshua Logan		
1967	Red, White and Zero	Jacky	Tony Richardson	Segment: Red and Blue (unreleased)	
1967	The Sailor from Gibraltar	Sheila	Tony Richardson		
1968	The Charge of the Light Brigade	Mrs. Clarissa Morris	Tony Richardson		
1968	Isadora	Isadora Duncan	Karel Reisz	Academy Award for Best Actress nomination	
1968	A Quiet Place in the Country	Flavia	Elio Petri	Italian: Un tranquillo posto di campagna	
1968	The Sea Gull	Nina	Sidney Lumet		
1969	Oh! What a Lovely War	Sylvia Pankhurst	Richard Attenborough		
1970	Dropout	Mary	Tinto Brass		
1971	The Devils	Sister Jeanne des Anges	Ken Russell		
1971	Mary, Queen of Scots	Mary, Queen of Scots	Charles Jarrott	Academy Award for Best Actress nomination	
1971	The Trojan Women	Andromache	Michael Cacoyannis		
1971	Vacation	Immacolata Meneghelli	Tinto Brass	Italian: La vacanza	
1974	Murder on the Orient Express	Mary Debenham	Sidney Lumet		
1975	Out of Season	Ann	Alan Bridges		
1976	The Seven-Per-Cent Solution	Lola Deveraux	Herbert Ross		
1977	Julia	Julia	Fred Zinnemann	Academy Award for Best Supporting Actress winner	
1979	Agatha	Agatha Christie	Michael Apted		
1979	Bear Island	Heddi Lindguist	Don Sharp		
1979	Yanks	Helen	John Schlesinger		
1983	Sing Sing	Queen	Sergio Corbucci		
1984	The Bostonians	Olive Chancellor	James Ivory	Academy Award for Best Actress nomination	
1985	Steaming	Nancy	Joseph Losey		
1985	Wetherby	Jean Travers	David Hare		
1986	Comrades	Mrs. Carlyle	Bill Douglas		
1987	Prick Up Your Ears	Peggy Ramsay	Stephen Frears		
1988	Consuming Passions	Mrs. Garza	Giles Foster		
1990	Romeo.Juliet	Mother Capulet	Armando Acosta		
1990	Breath of Life	Sister Crucifix	Beppe Cino	Italian: Diceria dell'untore	
1990	Stalin's Funeral	English journalist	Yevgeny Yevtushenko		
1991	The Ballad of the Sad Café	Miss Amelia	Simon Callow		
1992	Howards End	Ruth Wilcox	James Ivory	Academy Award for Best Supporting Actress nomination	
1993	A Wall of Silence	Kate Benson	Lita Stantic	Spanish: Un Muro de Silencio	
1993	The House of the Spirits	Nivea del Valle	Bille August		
1993	Sparrow	Sister Agata	Franco Zeffirelli	Italian: Storia di una capinera	
1993	Great Moments in Aviation	Dr. Angela Bead	Beeban Kidron		
1993	They	Florence Latimer	John Korty		
1994	Mother's Boys	Lydia Madigan	Yves Simoneau		
1994	Little Odessa	Irina Shapira	James Gray		
1995	A Month by the Lake	Miss Bentley	John Irvin		
1996	Mission: Impossible	Max	Brian De Palma		
1997	Smilla's Sense of Snow	Elsa Lubing	Bille August		
1997	Wilde	Lady Speranza Wilde	Brian Gilbert		
1997	Mrs. Dalloway	Clarissa Dalloway	Marleen Gorris		
1997	Déjà Vu	Skelly	Henry Jaglom		
1998	Deep Impact	Robin Lerner	Mimi Leder		
1998	Lulu on the Bridge	Catherine Moore	Paul Auster		
1999	Cradle Will Rock	Countess Constance LaGrange	Tim Robbins		
1999	Uninvited	Mrs. Ruttenburn	Carlo Gabriel Nero		
1999	Girl, Interrupted	Dr. Sonia Wick	James Mangold		
2000	Mirka	Kalsan	Rachid Benhadj		
2000	A Rumor of Angels	Maddy Bennett	Peter O'Fallon		
2001	The Pledge	Annalise Hansen	Sean Penn		
2002	Crime and Punishment	Rodian's Mother	Menahem Golan		
2002	Searching for Debra Winger	Herself	Rosanna Arquette	Documentary film	
2003	Good Boy!	The Greater Dane	John Robert Hoffman	Voice role	
2004	The Fever	Woman	Carl Gabriel Nero	Also executive producer	
2005	The Keeper: The Legend of Omar Khayyam	The Heiress	Kayvan Mashayekh		
2005	Short Order	Marianne	Anthony Byrne		
2005	The White Countess	Vera Belinskya	James Ivory		
2006	The Thief Lord	Sister Antonia	Richard Claus		
2006	Venus	Valerie	Roger Michell		
2007	The Riddle	Roberta Elliot	Brendan Foley		
2007	How About You	Georgia Platts	Anthony Byrne		
2007	Evening	Ann Lord	Lajos Koltai		
2007	Atonement	Older Briony Tallis	Joe Wright		
2008	Restraint	Sky News Reader	David Deneen		
2008	God, Smell and Her		Karin Westerlund		
2010	Eva	Eva	Adrian Popovici		
2010	Letters to Juliet	Claire Smith-Wyman	Gary Winick		
2010	The Whistleblower	Madeleine Rees	Larysa Kondracki		
2010	Miral	Bertha Spafford	Julian Schnabel		
2010	Animals United	Winnie	Reinhard Klooss; Holger Tappe	Voice only (English dub)	
2011	Anonymous	Queen Elizabeth I	Roland Emmerich		
2011	Cars 2	Mama Topolino / Queen	John Lasseter	Voice role	
2011	Coriolanus	Volumnia	Ralph Fiennes		
2012	Song for Marion	Marion	Paul Andrew Williams		
2012	The Last Will and Testament of Rosalind Leigh	Rosalind Leigh	Rodrigo Gudiño		
2013	The Butler	Annabeth Westfall	Lee Daniels		
2014	Foxcatcher	Jean du Pont	Bennett Miller		
2016	The Secret Scripture	Old Roseanne McNulty	Jim Sheridan		
2017	Sea Sorrow	—N/a	Vanessa Redgrave	Director	
2017	Film Stars Don't Die in Liverpool	Jeanne McDougall	Paul McGuigan		
2017	Joan Didion: The Center Will Not Hold	Herself	Griffin Dunne	Documentary film	
2018	The Aspern Papers	Juliana Bordereau	Julien Landais		
2019	Georgetown	Elsa Brecht	Christoph Waltz		
2019	Mrs Lowry & Son	Elizabeth Lowry	Adrian Noble		
2021	Finding You	Cathleen Sweeney	Brian Baugh		
2021	Alice, Through the Looking	The Narrator	Adam Donen	Voice role	
2022	The Lost Girls	Great Nana	Livia De Paolis		
2026	Cold Storage	Mary Rooney	Jonny Campbell		
2026	The Crystal Planet	The Matriarch	Arsen Anton Ostojić	Voice only (English dub)	
TBA	The Turning Door †	TBA	Nicholas Ashe Bateman	Voice only, in production	

== Television ==
Year	Title	Role	Notes	Ref.
1966	A Farewell to Arms	Nurse Catherine Barkley	Miniseries	
1973	A Picture of Katherine Mansfield	Katherine Mansfield	Television film	
1977	The Palestinian	Herself	Documentary film; also narrator and producer	
1980	Playing for Time	Fania Fénelon	Primetime Emmy Award for Outstanding Lead Actress in a Limited Series or Special winner Television film	
1982	My Body, My Child	Leenie Cabrezi	Television film	
1983	Wagner	Cosima Wagner	Miniseries	
1984	Faerie Tale Theatre	The Evil Queen	Episode: Snow White and the Seven Dwarfs	
1985	American Playhouse	Sarah Cloyce	Three-part series: Three Sovereigns for Sarah	
1986	Peter the Great	Tsarevna Sophia of Russia	Miniseries	
1986	Second Serve	Renée Richards	Television film	
1988	A Man for All Seasons	Lady Alice More	Television film	
1990	Orpheus Descending	Lady Torrance	Television film	
1991	What Ever Happened to...	Blanche Hudson	Television film	
1991	Young Catherine	Empress Elizabeth of Russia	Television film	
1992	The Young Indiana Jones Chronicles	Mrs. Prentiss	Episode: "London, May 1916"	
1995	Down Came a Blackbird	Anna Lenke	Television film	
1995	The Wind in the Willows	Grandmother (live-action) / Narrator (animated)	Television film	
1996	Two Mothers for Zachary	Nancy Shaffell	Television film	
1996	The Willows in Winter	Grandmother (live-action) / Narrator (animated)	Television film	
1997	Bella Mafia	Graziella Luciano	Television film	
2000	If These Walls Could Talk 2	Edith Tress	Primetime Emmy Award for Outstanding Supporting Actress in a Miniseries or Movie winner Television film; Segment: 1961	
2001	Jack and the Beanstalk: The Real Story	Countess Wilhelmina	Miniseries; also narrator	
2002	The Gathering Storm	Clementine Churchill	Television film	
2002	The Locket	Esther Huish	Television film	
2003	Byron	The Viscountess Melbourne	Television film	
2004–2009	Nip/Tuck	Dr. Erica Noughton	10 episodes	
2006	The Shell Seekers	Penelope Keeling	Miniseries	
2008	Ein Job	Hannah Silbergrau	Television film	
2009	The Day of the Triffids	Durrant	Miniseries; part two	
2012	Political Animals	Justice Diane Nash	Miniseries; 1 episode: "The Woman Problem"	
2012–present	Call the Midwife	Mature Jennifer Worth (narrator)	Drama series	
2013	The Thirteenth Tale	Vida Winter	Television film	
2014	Black Box	Dr. Helen Hartramph	Drama series; 1 season	
2015	The Go-Between	Older Marian	Television film	
2017	Man in an Orange Shirt	Flora	Miniseries	
2020	Worzel Gummidge	Peg	Episode: "Saucy Nancy"	

== Stage ==
Year	Title	Role	Venue	Ref.
1958	A Touch of Sun	Caroline Lester	Saville Theatre	
1958	Major Barbara	Sarah Undershaft	Royal Court Theatre	
1959	A Midsummer Night's Dream	Helena	Shakespeare Memorial Theatre, Stratford-upon-Avon	
1959	Coriolanus	Valeria	Shakespeare Memorial Theatre, Stratford-upon-Avon	
1960	Look on Tempests	Rose Sinclair	Comedy Theatre	
1960	The Tiger and the Horse	Stella	Queen's Theatre	
1961	The Lady from the Sea	Boletta	Queen's Theatre	
1961–1962	As You Like It	Rosalind	Royal Shakespeare Company; Royal Shakespeare Theatre, Stratford-upon-Avon; Aldwych Theatre	
1961–1962	The Taming of the Shrew	Katharina	Royal Shakespeare Company; Aldwych Theatre; Royal Shakespeare Theatre, Stratford-upon-Avon	
1962	Cymbeline	Imogen	Royal Shakespeare Company; Royal Shakespeare Theatre, Stratford-upon-Avon	
1964	The Seagull	Nina	Queen's Theatre	
1966	The Prime of Miss Jean Brodie	Jean Brodie	Wyndham's Theatre	
1969	Daniel Deronda	Gwendolen Harleth	University Theatre, Manchester	
1971	Cato Street	Susan Thistlewood	The Young Vic	
1972	The Threepenny Opera	Polly Peachum	Prince of Wales Theatre	
1972	Twelfth Night	Viola	Shaw Theatre	
1973	Antony and Cleopatra	Cleopatra	Bankside Globe Theatre	
1973	Design for Living	Gilda	Phoenix Theatre	
1974–1975	Macbeth	Lady Macbeth	Ahmanson Theatre, Los Angeles	
1976–1979	The Lady from the Sea	Ellida	Circle in the Square Theatre, New York City; Royal Exchange Theatre, Manchester; Roundhouse	
1984	The Aspern Papers	Miss Tina	Theatre Royal Haymarket	
1985	The Seagull	Arkadina	Queen's Theatre	
1986	Ghosts	Mrs. Alving	The Young Vic; Wyndham's Theatre	
1986	Antony and Cleopatra	Cleopatra	Theatre Royal Haymarket	
1986	The Taming of the Shrew	Katharina	Theatre Royal Haymarket	
1988	A Touch of the Poet	Nora	The Young Vic; Comedy Theatre	
1988–1989	Orpheus Descending	Lady Torrance	Theatre Royal Haymarket; Neil Simon Theatre, New York City	
1989	A Madhouse in Goa		Lyric Theatre, Hammersmith; Apollo Theatre	
1990	Three Sisters	Olga	Queen's Theatre	
1991	When She Danced	Isadora Duncan	Globe Theatre	
1992	Heartbreak House	Hesione Hushabye	Theatre Royal Haymarket	
1994	Vita & Virginia	Vita Sackville-West	Union Square Theatre, New York City	
1994	Brecht in Exile		Bridge Lane Theatre, Battersea	
1996	John Gabriel Borkman	Ella Rentheim	Royal National Theatre; Lyttelton Theatre	
1997	Antony and Cleopatra	Cleopatra	The Public Theater, New York City	
1999	A Song at Twilight	Carlotta	Gielgud Theatre	
2000	The Tempest	Prospero	Shakespeare’s Globe	
2000–2001	The Cherry Orchard	Madame Ranevskaya	Royal National Theatre; Cottesloe Theatre	
2002	Lady Windermere's Fan	Mrs. Erlynne	Theatre Royal Haymarket	
2003	Long Day's Journey Into Night	Mary Cavan Tyrone	Plymouth Theatre, New York City	
2005	Hecuba	Hecuba	Royal Shakespeare Company; Albery Theatre	
2007–2008	The Year of Magical Thinking	Joan Didion	Booth Theatre, New York City; Royal National Theatre; Lyttelton Theatre	
2010–2011	Driving Miss Daisy	Daisy Werthan	John Golden Theatre, New York City; Wyndham's Theatre	
2013	The Revisionist	Maria	Cherry Lane Theatre, New York City	
2013	Much Ado About Nothing	Beatrice	The Old Vic	
2016	Richard III	Queen Margaret	Almeida Theatre	
2018–2019	The Inheritance	Margaret	The Young Vic; Noël Coward Theatre	
2022	My Fair Lady	Mrs. Higgins	London Coliseum	

== See also ==
- List of awards and nominations received by Vanessa Redgrave

== Sources ==
- Callahan, Dan (2014). Vanessa. New York: Simon and Schuster. ISBN 978-1-605-98593-0.
- Lehmann, Courtney (26 September 2014). Screen Adaptations: Romeo and Juliet: A Close Study of the Relationship Between Text and Film. London: Bloomsbury. ISBN 978-1-408-19876-6.
