= List of awards and nominations received by Vanessa Redgrave =

Vanessa Redgrave awards and nominations
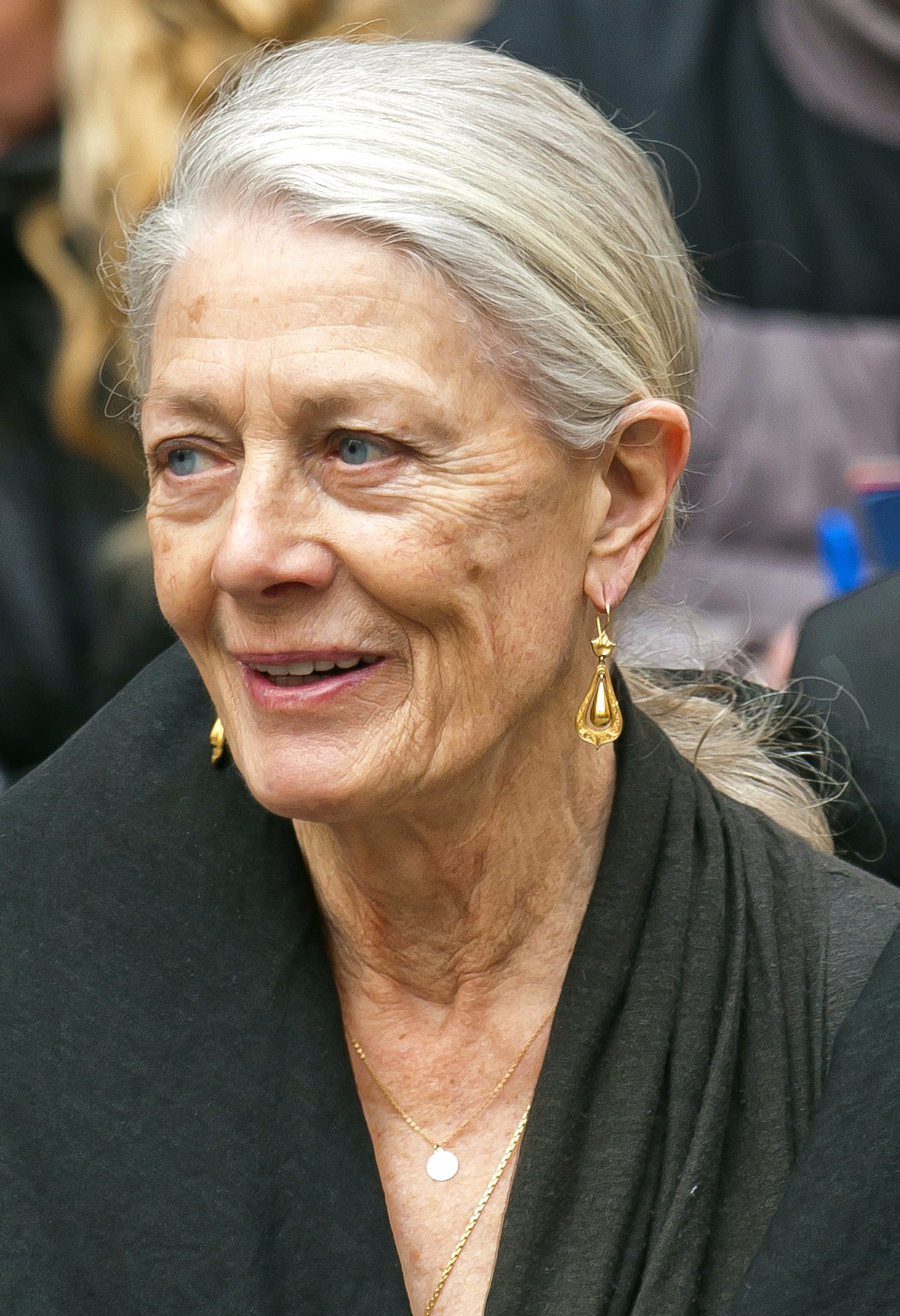
- Redgrave at the 2011 Berlin Film Festival
Awards and nominations
Award	Wins	Nominations
Academy Awards	1	6
BAFTA Awards	1	4
Critics' Choice	0	1
Emmy Awards	2	6
Golden Globes	2	13
Grammy Awards	0	1
Actor Awards	1	4
Olivier Awards	1	3
Tony Awards	1	3

Totals (Note: Certain award groups do not simply award one winner. They acknowledge several different recipients, have runners-up, and have third place. Since this is a specific recognition and is different from losing an award, runner-up mentions are considered wins in this award tally. For simplification and to avoid errors, each award in this list has been presumed to have had a prior nomination.)
- Wins: 42
- Nominations: 97

Dame Vanessa Redgrave is an English actress known for her roles on stage and screen. She has won several accolades including an Academy Award, a BAFTA Award, two Primetime Emmy Awards, two Golden Globe Awards, an Actor Award, a Laurence Olivier Award, and a Tony Award as well as a nomination for a Grammy Award. Redgrave is one of the few actresses to have won the Triple Crown of Acting having won a competitive Oscar, Emmy, and Tony Award. She has been honored with the BFI Fellowship in 1988, the BAFTA Fellowship in 2010 and the Honorary Golden Lion in 2018. In 2022 she made a Dame Commander of the Order of the British Empire by Queen Elizabeth II. (Note: She was previously offered the title in 1999 but declined it before accepting in 2022.)

On film, Regrave earned early acclaim and rose to prominence for playing an upper class wife in the British comedy Morgan – A Suitable Case for Treatment (1966) for which she received the Cannes Film Festival Award for Best Actress as well as nominations for the Academy Award, BAFTA Award, Golden Globe Award for Best Actress. She played Guinevere in the musical fantasy romance Camelot (1967) earning a nomination a Golden Globe Award. She portrayed Isadora Duncan in the biographical drama Isadora (1968) for which she won her second Cannes Film Festival Award for Best Actress as well as nominations for the Academy Award and a Golden Globe Award. She played the title role in the historical drama Mary, Queen of Scots (1971) earning nominations for the Academy Award and Golden Globe Award for Best Actress.

She gained acclaim for her portrayed of a wealthy American who becomes involved in anti-Nazi resistance efforts in Europe during the 1930s in the political drama Julia (1977) for which she won the Academy Award for Best Supporting Actress and the Golden Globe Award for Best Supporting Actress – Motion Picture. She played a spinster during the suffrage movement in the Merchant-Ivory costume drama The Bostonians (1984) earning the National Society of Film Critics Award for Best Actress as well as nominations for the Academy Award and the Golden Globe Award for Best Actress. For her portrayal of Peggy Ramsay in the Stephen Frears directed British film Prick Up Your Ears (1987) she was nominated for a BAFTA Award. She played a quiet and wealthy owner of the titular estate in the Merchant-Ivory film Howards End (1992) earning a nomination for an Academy Award. For playing a terminally ill wife in Little Odessa (1994) she won the Volpi Cup for Best Actress. She played the older Briony in the romantic war drama Atonement (2007) for which she was nominated for the Critics' Choice Movie Award.

On television, she gained acclaim for her portrayal of Fania Fénelon in the CBS film Playing for Time (1980) for which she won the Primetime Emmy Award for Outstanding Lead Actress in a Miniseries or Movie. She played part of a elderly lesbian couple in the HBO film If These Walls Could Talk 2 (2000) earning the Primetime Emmy Award for Outstanding Supporting Actress in a Miniseries or Movie, the Golden Globe Award for Best Supporting Actress – Series, Miniseries or Television Film, and the Actor Award for Outstanding Performance by a Female Actor in a Miniseries or Television Movie. She portrayed Clementine Churchill, the wife of Winston Churchill in the HBO film The Gathering Storm (2002) for which she was nominated for the Primetime Emmy Award, British Academy Television Award, Golden Globe Award, and Actor Award.

On stage, she started her career on the West End earning the Laurence Olivier Award for Actress of the Year in a Revival for playing Miss Tina, a naive niece in the Henry James play The Aspern Papers (1984). She was Olivier-nominated for her roles in A Touch of the Poet (1988), John Gabriel Borkman (1997), and The Inheritance (2019). On Broadway she earned the Tony Award for Best Actress in a Play playing Mary Tyrone in the revival of the Eugene O'Neill play Long Day's Journey into Night (2003). She was Tony-nominated for playing Joan Didion in her memoir play The Year of Magical Thinking (2007) and playing a snooty elderly southern woman in the Alfred Uhry play Driving Miss Daisy (2011).

== Major associations ==
=== Academy Awards ===
Year	Category	Nominated work	Result	Ref.
1966	Best Actress	Morgan – A Suitable Case for Treatment	Nominated	
1968	Best Actress	Isadora	Nominated	
1971	Best Actress	Mary, Queen of Scots	Nominated	
1977	Best Supporting Actress	Julia	Won	
1984	Best Actress	The Bostonians	Nominated	
1992	Best Supporting Actress	Howards End	Nominated	

=== BAFTA Awards ===
Year	Category	Nominated work	Result	Ref.
British Academy Film Awards
1966	Best British Actress	Morgan – A Suitable Case for Treatment	Nominated	
1987	Best Actress in a Supporting Role	Prick Up Your Ears	Nominated	
2010	BAFTA Fellowship	—N/a	Honoured	
British Academy Television Awards
1966	Best Actress	—N/a	Won (Note: The 1966 BAFTA for Best TV Actress honoured all of a performer's work for that year; no specific role was credited.)	
2003	Best Actress	The Gathering Storm	Nominated	

=== Critics' Choice Awards ===
Year	Category	Nominated work	Result	Ref.
Critics' Choice Movie Awards
2007	Best Supporting Actress	Atonement	Nominated	

=== Emmy Awards ===
Year	Category	Nominated work	Result	Ref.
1981	Outstanding Lead Actress in a Limited Series or Special	Playing for Time	Won	
1986	Outstanding Lead Actress in a Miniseries or Special	Second Serve	Nominated	
1986	Outstanding Supporting Actress in a Miniseries or Special	Peter the Great	Nominated	
1991	Outstanding Supporting Actress in a Miniseries or Special	Young Catherine	Nominated	
2000	Outstanding Supporting Actress in a Miniseries or Movie	If These Walls Could Talk 2	Won	
2002	Outstanding Lead Actress in a Miniseries or Movie	The Gathering Storm	Nominated	

=== Golden Globe Awards ===
Year	Category	Nominated work	Result	Ref.
1966	Best Actress in a Motion Picture – Comedy or Musical	Morgan – A Suitable Case for Treatment	Nominated	
1967	Best Actress in a Motion Picture – Comedy or Musical	Camelot	Nominated	
1968	Best Actress in a Motion Picture – Drama	Isadora	Nominated	
1971	Best Actress in a Motion Picture – Drama	Mary, Queen of Scots	Nominated	
1977	Best Supporting Actress – Motion Picture	Julia	Won	
1984	Best Actress in a Motion Picture – Drama	The Bostonians	Nominated	
1986	Best Actress – Miniseries or Television Film	Second Serve	Nominated	
1987	Best Supporting Actress – Motion Picture	Prick Up Your Ears	Nominated	
1988	Best Actress – Miniseries or Television Film	A Man for All Seasons	Nominated	
1995	Best Actress in a Motion Picture – Comedy or Musical	A Month by the Lake	Nominated	
1997	Best Actress – Miniseries or Television Film	Bella Mafia	Nominated	
2000	Best Supporting Actress – Television	If These Walls Could Talk 2	Won	
2002	Best Actress – Miniseries or Television Film	The Gathering Storm	Nominated	

=== Grammy Awards ===
Year	Category	Nominated work	Result	Ref.
2002	Best Spoken Word Album for Children	Oscar Wilde: The Selfish Giant & The Nightingale And The Rose	Nominated	

=== Actor Awards ===
Year	Category	Nominated work	Result	Ref.
2000	Outstanding Actress in a Miniseries or Television Movie	If These Walls Could Talk 2	Won	
2002	Outstanding Actress in a Miniseries or Television Movie	The Gathering Storm	Nominated	
2007	Outstanding Actress in a Miniseries or Television Movie	The Fever (Note: The film was released in 2004, but Redgrave was nominated for a SAG Award in 2007.)	Nominated	
2013	Outstanding Cast in a Motion Picture	The Butler	Nominated	

=== Laurence Olivier Awards ===
Year	Category	Nominated work	Result	Ref.
1984	Best Actress in a Revival	The Aspern Papers	Won	
1988	Best Actress in a Revival	A Touch of the Poet	Nominated	
1997	Best Actress	John Gabriel Borkman	Nominated	
2019	Best Supporting Actress	The Inheritance	Nominated	

=== Tony Awards ===
Year	Category	Nominated work	Result	Ref.
2003	Best Actress in a Play	Long Day's Journey into Night	Won	
2007	Best Actress in a Play	The Year of Magical Thinking	Nominated	
2011	Best Actress in a Play	Driving Miss Daisy	Nominated	

== Miscellaneous awards ==
Organizations	Year	Category	Nominated work	Result	Ref.
Cannes Film Festival	1966	Best Actress	Morgan – A Suitable Case for Treatment	Won	
Cannes Film Festival	1969	Best Actress	Isadora	Won	
Cannes Film Festival	2017	Golden Camera	Sea Sorrow	Nominated	
Cannes Film Festival	2017	Golden Eye	Sea Sorrow	Nominated	
Venice Film Festival	1994	Volpi Cup for Best Actress	Little Odessa	Won	
Venice Film Festival	2018	Golden Lion for Lifetime Achievement	—N/a	Honoured	
David di Donatello	1972	Best International Actress	Mary, Queen of Scots	Won	
Goldene Kamera	1992	Best International Actress	Young Catherine / Howards End	Won	
London Film Critics Circle	2007	Best British Supporting Actress	Atonement	Won	
Los Angeles Film Critics Association	1977	Best Supporting Actress	Julia	Won	
Satellite Awards	2000	Satellite Award for Best Actress – Miniseries or Television Film	If These Walls Could Talk 2	Nominated	
Satellite Awards	2002	Satellite Award for Best Actress – Miniseries or Television Film	The Gathering Storm	Nominated	
Satellite Awards	2010	Satellite Award for Best Supporting Actress – Motion Picture	Letters to Juliet	Nominated	
Satellite Awards	2011	Satellite Award for Best Supporting Actress – Motion Picture	Coriolanus	Nominated	
National Society of Film Critics	1969	Best Actress	Isadora	Won	
National Society of Film Critics	1977	Best Supporting Actress	Julia	Runner-up	
National Society of Film Critics	1984	Best Actress	The Bostonians	Won	
National Society of Film Critics	1985	Best Actress	Wetherby	Won	
New York Film Critics Circle	1972	Best Actress	Mary, Queen of Scots	Runner-up	
New York Film Critics Circle	1977	Best Supporting Actress	Julia	Runner-up	
New York Film Critics Circle	1987	Best Supporting Actress	Prick Up Your Ears	Won	

== Other theatre awards ==
Organizations	Year	Category	Nominated work	Result	Ref.
Drama Desk Awards	1997	Outstanding Actress in a Play	Antony and Cleopatra	Nominated	
Drama Desk Awards	2003	Outstanding Actress in a Play	Long Day's Journey into Night	Won	
Drama Desk Awards	2007	Outstanding Solo Performance	The Year of Magical Thinking	Won	
Drama Desk Awards	2013	Outstanding Actress in a Play	The Revisionist	Nominated	
Evening Standard Awards	1961	Best Actress	As You Like It	Won	
Evening Standard Awards	1979	Best Actress	The Lady from the Sea	Won	
Evening Standard Awards	1985	Best Actress	The Seagull	Won	
Evening Standard Awards	1991	Best Actress	When She Danced	Won	

== Honorary awards ==
Organization	Year	Honor	Result	Ref.
British Film Institute	1988	BFI Fellowship	Honoured	
Boston Film Festival	1995	Film Excellence Award	Honoured	
San Sebastian Film Festival	1999	Donostia Award	Honoured	
GLAAD Media Award	2001	Excellence in Media Award	Honoured	
Hollywood Film Festival	2002	Capri Legend Award	Honoured	
American Theatre Hall of Fame	2003	Inductee	Honoured	
Bratislava International Film Festival	2005	Artistic Excellence Award	Honoured	
British Academy of Film and Television Arts	2010	BAFTA Fellowship	Honoured	
Brunel University	2011	Honorary Doctor of Letters	Honoured	
International Antalya Film Festival	2015	Lifetime Achievement Award	Honoured	
Evening Standard Theatre Award	2015	Editor's Award	Honoured	
European Film Academy	2023	Lifetime Achievement Award	Honoured	
Venice International Film Festival	2018	Honorary Golden Lion	Honoured	
Queen Elizabeth II	2022	Dame Commander of the Order of the British Empire (Note: She was previously offered the title in 1999 but declined it before accepting in 2022.)	Honoured	

== See also ==
- Vanessa Redgrave filmography
