= Leon Clore =

English film producer

- Born: 9 July 1918; Brighton, England
- Died: 9 February 1992 (aged 73); White City, London, England
- Citizenship: British
- Occupation: Film producer
- Children: G. Marius Clore

Leon Clore (9 July 1918 – 9 February 1992) was a British film producer who was primarily involved in documentary and short films, as well as several motion pictures.

== Biography ==
Leon Clore was born in Brighton on 9 July 1918. He was the nephew of Sir Charles Clore, whose foundation enabled the Tate Gallery, via the Clore Gallery, to adequately present the William Turner estate.

Clore's film career began as the first assistant director for the British film The Silver Darlings in 1947. Up to 1951, Clore worked for the Crown Film Unit before taking charge of Basic Films. He first worked as a film producer in 1951, and was responsible for the documentary short film Sunday by the Sea. His documentary The Conquest of Everest was nominated for an Academy Award for Best Documentary Feature.

Clore produced the romantic film Virgin Island (1958), directed by Pat Jackson and starring John Cassavetes and Sidney Poitier; Morgan – A Suitable Case for Treatment (1966) starring David Warner and Vanessa Redgrave, the Karel Reisz directed David Mercer comedy; All Neat in Black Stockings (1969) with Victor Henry in the leading role; and The French Lieutenant's Woman (1981) directed by Karel Reisz, starring Meryl Streep and Jeremy Irons. He produced a number of advertisements.

His last involvement in the film business was in the documentary short "Your Degree and the Royal Navy?" in 1986.

Clore died at Hammersmith Hospital in London, where he was being treated for cancer, on 9 February 1992 at the age of 73. Clore's son G. Marius Clore FRS became a biophysicist.

== Selected filmography ==
- 1951: Sunday by the Sea , documentary short film)
- 1953: The Conquest of Everest
- 1957: Apaches
- 1957: Time Without Pity
- 1958: Virgin Island (US: Our Virgin Island)
- 1966: Morgan – A Suitable Case for Treatment
- 1969: All Neat in Black Stockings
- 1981: The French Lieutenant’s Woman (film)
- 1986: Your Degree and the Royal Navy? (Documentary short)
