= Palestinian (disambiguation) =

Palestinians are an Arab ethnonational group native to the region of Palestine.

Palestinian may also refer to:

== Groups of people ==
- Definitions of Palestinian, listing several definitions
- Palestinian diaspora, Palestinian people living outside the region of Palestine
- Palestinian refugees, citizens of Mandatory Palestine, and their descendants
- Arab citizens of Israel, many of whom self-identify as Palestinian

== Other uses ==
- Palestinian Arabic, dialect of Levantine Arabic
- Palestinian cuisine
- Palestinian (horse), a racehorse
- The Palestinian, a 1977 television documentary

== See also ==
- Palestine (disambiguation)
- List of Palestinians
- Palestrinian
