= The French Lieutenant's Woman (film) =

1981 British film by Karel Reisz

- Original film poster
- Directed by: Karel Reisz
- Written by: Harold Pinter
- Based on: The French Lieutenant's Woman; 1969 novel by John Fowles
- Produced by: Leon Clore
- Starring: Meryl Streep; Jeremy Irons; David Warner
- Cinematography: Freddie Francis
- Edited by: John Bloom
- Music by: Carl Davis
- Distributed by: United Artists
- Release date: 18 September 1981
- Running time: 127 minutes
- Country: United Kingdom
- Language: English
- Budget: $8 million
- Box office: $26.9 million

The French Lieutenant's Woman is a 1981 British romantic drama film directed by Karel Reisz, produced by Leon Clore, and adapted by the playwright Harold Pinter. It is based on The French Lieutenant's Woman, a 1969 novel by John Fowles. The music score is by Carl Davis and the cinematography by Freddie Francis.

The film stars Meryl Streep and Jeremy Irons. Other featured actors include Hilton McRae, Peter Vaughan, Colin Jeavons, Liz Smith, Patience Collier, Richard Griffiths, David Warner, Alun Armstrong, Penelope Wilton, and Leo McKern.

The film received five Oscar nominations. Streep was nominated for the Academy Award for Best Actress, and Pinter for the Academy Award for Best Adapted Screenplay.

== Plot ==
The film intercuts the stories of two romantic affairs. One is within a Victorian period drama involving a gentleman palaeontologist, Charles Smithson, and the complex and troubled Sarah Woodruff, known as "the French lieutenant's woman". The other affair is between the actors Mike and Anna, playing the lead roles in a modern filming of the story. In both segments, Jeremy Irons and Meryl Streep play the lead roles.

John Fowles's The French Lieutenant's Woman has multiple endings, and the two parallel stories in the movie have different outcomes. In the Victorian story, Charles enters into an intensely emotional relationship with Sarah, an enigmatic and self-imposed exile he meets just after becoming engaged to Ernestina (Lynsey Baxter), a rich merchant's daughter in Lyme Regis. Sarah tells Charles to meet her by the cliffs and tells him of how she lost her virtue in the public's eyes when she bedded a French Lieutenant who had washed ashore in a household she was then working for as a governess. While initially disturbed by her, Charles tells her to go to London and he would secretly send her money to live on. Charles and Sarah meet secretly in the Lyme Regis Undercliff and eventually have sex in an Exeter hotel. During the affair, Sarah's hymen breaks and that is how Charles learns Sarah never had sex with the French Lieutenant at all, and he forgives her for lying to him.

This leads to Charles's breaking his engagement, but then Sarah disappears. In social disgrace after being sued for breach of promise by Ernestina, Charles searches for Sarah, fearing she has become a prostitute in London. After three years, Sarah, who has a job as a governess in the Lake District, contacts Charles to explain that she needed time to find herself. Despite Charles's initial anger, he forgives her, and the two are reconciled. They are finally seen boating on Windermere.

In the modern story, the American actress Anna and the English actor Mike, both married, are shown as having an extended affair during the making of the Victorian film, in which Anna plays Sarah and Mike portrays Charles. As filming concludes, Mike wishes to continue the relationship, but Anna becomes increasingly cool about the affair and avoids Mike in favour of spending time with her French husband. During the film's wrap party, Anna leaves without saying goodbye to Mike. Mike calls to Anna, using her character's name Sarah, from an upstairs window on the set where Charles and Sarah reconciled, as she drives away.

== Cast ==
- Meryl Streep as Miss Sarah Woodruff / Mrs. Roughwood and Anna
- Jeremy Irons as Charles Henry Smithson and Mike
- Hilton McRae as Sam
- Emily Morgan as Mary
- Charlotte Mitchell as Mrs. Tranter
- Lynsey Baxter as Miss Ernestina Freeman
- Jean Faulds as Cook
- Peter Vaughan as Mr. Ernest Freeman
- Colin Jeavons as Vicar
- Liz Smith as Mrs. Fairley
- Patience Collier as Mrs. Poulteney
- John Barrett as Dairyman
- Leo McKern as Dr. Grogan
- Penelope Wilton as Sonia
- Richard Griffiths as Sir Tom
- David Warner as Murphy
- Alun Armstrong as Grimes
- Gérard Falconetti as Davide

== Production notes ==
Harold Pinter and Karel Reisz worked on the script in 1979, with Leon Clore as producer, and with whom Reisz regularly worked in their company Film Contracts, formed many years earlier. Leon had produced Reisz' Morgan: A Suitable Case for Treatment (starring David Warner), The film was shot in 1980 on location in Lyme Regis, Dartmouth, Exeter, London docks, and Windermere. Studio sets were built at Twickenham Studios in London to Assheton Gorton's period-perfect designs. The opening shot in the film establishes the dual stories by having the assistant director mark the shot with a clapper board, and then run out of the shot to reveal the Victorian seaside front, with Charles and Ernestina taking the air.

The audience is given alternating sequences of a rigid Victorian society, and the more relaxed modern life of a working film crew, revealing the great moral divide between past and present. Prostitution, Considered in Its Moral, Social, and Sanitary Aspects, an 1857 book by William Acton, is referred to in the film when Streep's character mentions that in 1857 there were 80,000 prostitutes in the county of London and that one house in 60 functioned as a brothel.

The book was published in 1969. Its transfer to the big screen was a protracted process, with film rights changing hands a number of times before a treatment, funds and cast were finalized. Originally, Malcolm Bradbury and Christopher Bigsby approached Fowles to suggest a television adaptation, to which Fowles was amenable, but the producer Saul Zaentz finally arranged for the film version to be made.

A number of directors were attached to the film: Sidney Lumet, Robert Bolt, Fred Zinnemann and Miloš Forman. The script went through a number of treatments, including one by Dennis Potter in 1975 and by James Costigan in 1976, before Pinter's final draft.

Actors considered for the role of Charles Smithson/Mike included Robert Redford and Richard Chamberlain, and Sarah/Anna included Francesca Annis, Charlotte Rampling, Gemma Jones and Fowles's choice Helen Mirren.

The award-winning music was composed by Carl Davis and performed by an unidentified orchestra and viola soloist Kenneth Essex.

== Release ==
=== Box office ===
The film was the second highest-grossing British film for the year with theatrical rentals of £1,244,152, behind Chariots of Fire.

=== Critical reception ===
Roger Ebert of the Chicago Sun-Times gave the film three-and-a-half stars out of four, calling it "a beautiful film to look at, and remarkably well-acted". Vincent Canby of The New York Times called it "an astonishingly beautiful film, acted to the elegant hilt by Meryl Streep as the ultimately unreliable Sarah; Jeremy Irons, who looks a lot like the young Laurence Olivier of Wuthering Heights, as Charles Smithson, and by a cast of splendid supporting actors of the sort that only England seems to possess." Variety wrote, "The effect of the two interwoven stories is at times irritating and confusing, but ultimately most affecting. This is due in large part to the strong performances of Meryl Streep as Sara Woodruff/Anna and Jeremy Irons as Charles Smithson/Mike."

Gene Siskel of the Chicago Tribune gave the film four stars out of four and called it "a beautifully made film, evoking the past and the present quite well. Both Streep and Irons live up to the extraordinary advance billing they have received." He ranked the film #10 on his year-end list of the best films of 1981. Sheila Benson of the Los Angeles Times, "The physical trappings that surround the Charles-Sarah story are as detailed and knowledgeable as the book's, yet the film avoids a cozy-corner Victoriana that would have been easy to fall into." She also praised "Meryl Streep's luminous performance" and Assheton Gorton's production design as "nothing short of brilliant".

A mixed review by Pauline Kael of The New Yorker described the novel as "a meditation on the romantic mystery women and sensual madwomen of Victorian fiction", explaining that "We never really get into the movie, because, as Sarah, Meryl Streep gives an immaculate, technically accomplished performance, but she isn't mysterious." Gary Arnold of The Washington Post wrote, "An unfailing pictorial treat, The French Lieutenant's Woman rivals last year's Tess as a handsome and evocative period production."

As of October 2023, The French Lieutenant's Woman held a rating of 83% on Rotten Tomatoes based on 29 reviews. It received a 64 on Metacritic, based on ten reviews.

=== Accolades ===
Award	Category	Nominee(s)	Result	Ref.
Academy Awards	Best Actress	Meryl Streep	Nominated	
Academy Awards	Best Screenplay – Based on Material from Another Medium	Harold Pinter	Nominated	
Academy Awards	Best Art Direction	Art Direction: Assheton Gorton; Set Decoration: Ann Mollo	Nominated	
Academy Awards	Best Costume Design	Tom Rand	Nominated	
Academy Awards	Best Film Editing	John Bloom	Nominated	
Bodil Awards	Best European Film	Karel Reisz	Won	
British Academy Film Awards	Best Film	Leon Clore	Nominated	
British Academy Film Awards	Best Direction	Karel Reisz	Nominated	
British Academy Film Awards	Best Actor in a Leading Role	Jeremy Irons	Nominated	
British Academy Film Awards	Best Actress in a Leading Role	Meryl Streep	Won	
British Academy Film Awards	Best Screenplay	Harold Pinter	Nominated	
British Academy Film Awards	Best Cinematography	Freddie Francis	Nominated	
British Academy Film Awards	Best Costume Design	Tom Rand	Nominated	
British Academy Film Awards	Best Editing	John Bloom	Nominated	
British Academy Film Awards	Best Original Film Music	Carl Davis	Won	
British Academy Film Awards	Best Production Design	Assheton Gorton	Nominated	
British Academy Film Awards	Best Sound	Don Sharpe, Ivan Sharrock, and Bill Rowe	Won	
British Society of Cinematographers Awards	Best Cinematography in a Theatrical Feature Film	Freddie Francis	Won	
César Awards	Best Foreign Film	Karel Reisz	Nominated	
David di Donatello Awards	Best Foreign Actress	Meryl Streep	Nominated	
David di Donatello Awards	Best Foreign Screenplay	Harold Pinter	Won	
Evening Standard British Film Awards	Best Film	Karel Reisz	Won	
Fotogramas de Plata	Best Foreign Movie Performer	Meryl Streep	Nominated	
Golden Globe Awards	Best Motion Picture – Drama		Nominated	
Golden Globe Awards	Best Actress in a Motion Picture – Drama	Meryl Streep	Won	
Golden Globe Awards	Best Screenplay – Motion Picture	Harold Pinter	Nominated	
Grammy Awards	Best Album of Original Score Written for a Motion Picture or Television Special	Carl Davis	Nominated	
Los Angeles Film Critics Association Awards	Best Actress	Meryl Streep	Won	
Los Angeles Film Critics Association Awards	Best Cinematography	Freddie Francis	Runner-up	
