= John Ames (writer) =

American writer and educator

John Ames (born April 18, 1944) is an American writer and educator. His works include co-authorship with Renée Richards of two biographies: Second Serve: The Renée Richards Story, which was adapted for television as Second Serve starring Vanessa Redgrave; and No Way Renée: The Second Half of My Notorious Life. Ames has been on the faculty of Santa Fe Community College, in Gainesville, Florida, for more than thirty years, where he is a professor of English.
