= Me! I'm Afraid of Virginia Woolf =

- Screenplay by: Alan Bennett
- Directed by: Stephen Frears
- Starring: Neville Smith; Carol MacReady; Thora Hird
- Theme music composer: George Fenton
- Country of origin: United Kingdom
- Original language: English

Production
- Producers: Stephen Frears; Tony Wharmby
- Cinematography: Barry Noakes
- Editor: Jon Costelloe
- Running time: 64 minutes
- Production company: London Weekend Television

Original release
- Release: 2 December 1978

Me! I'm Afraid of Virginia Woolf is a 1978 television play by Alan Bennett, produced by London Weekend Television and directed by Stephen Frears. The title of the play is a parody of, and answer to the question, Who's Afraid of Virginia Woolf?, which in turn plays on the title of the Disney song "Who's Afraid of the Big Bad Wolf?".

== Plot ==
It tells the story of Trevor, a teacher of English Literature to adults in the evenings. Trevor is not a happy man; his girlfriend Wendy gets her hair in her muesli, someone has vandalised his visual aids for his evening classes, drawing a large pair of breasts on his poster of Virginia Woolf and a big cigar in the mouth of E. M. Forster on the other; he suffers from 'curate's bladder' and is unable to urinate if there is another man present in the toilet; and he does not even like his name –Trevor – "Did you ever hear of a Trevor Beethoven or Trevor Einstein?" And he always takes a book on buses so he has somewhere to look.

Most of his students are hopeless but there is one bright working-class man in the class. After an unpleasant evening during which he gets punched in the face he meets the bright student, Skinner, by chance. Skinner addresses him as 'Trev' and this cheers him up greatly, making him see himself in a new light.

== Cast ==
- Alan Bennett – Narrator
- Neville Smith – Hopkins
- Julie Walters – Woman in Waiting Room
- Frank Middlemass – Doctor
- Robert Longden – Mr Willard
- Thora Hird – Mrs Hopkins
- Carol MacReady – Wendy
- Margaret Courtenay – Mrs Broadbent
- Lynne Carol – Mrs Tucker
- Barbara Hicks – Miss Gibbons
- Janine Duvitski – Maureen
- Derek Thompson – Skinner
- Hugh Lloyd – Mr Dodds

== Reception ==
Film critic Melvyn Briggs opined that "Alan Bennett has perhaps not gone quite so far as some expected and others may have wished since he went beyond the fringe, but his wit and whimsy are sharply pointed." Paul Taylor wrote in The Independent that "Trevor, the hapless bisexual, is pulled at by all these conflicting forces, his cultural bemusement drolely summed up in the title."

Michael Brooke wrote "although Bennett's own narration is delivered in the third person, anyone familiar with his other works will recognise Trevor Hopkins as a kindred spirit; they will also recognise his constant dilemma — the way doing nothing can be just as meaningful as doing something, and that self-consciousness creates a constant fear of misinterpretation." He went on to state that "despite his dreary sex life with Wendy, Hopkins is clearly not homosexual."

Author Daphne Turner argues that "Bennett's landscape is one of ordinary, disappointing life, people have endurance and resilience and there are small celebrations; Hopkins at the end is about to start a love affair with the cheerful and independent Skinner; interestingly, these small victories are often represented as sexual ones."
