= John Hunter (screenwriter) =

American-born screenwriter (1911–1984)

- Born: 23 August 1911; New York, U.S.
- Died: 8 September 1984 (aged 73); London, England
- Education: Trinity College, Cambridge
- Occupation: Screenwriter
- Notable work: Carrington VC (1955); Never Take Sweets from a Stranger (1960)

John Evans Hunter (23 August 1911 – 8 September 1984) was an American-born, BAFTA-nominated screenwriter in the British film industry.

== Biography ==
The son of actress Millicent Evans (1888–1952) and producer/director Ernest J. Carpenter (1869–1964), Hunter was born in New York on 23 August 1911. He later claimed to be the illegitimate son of Douglas Fairbanks. His parents divorced in 1917 and his mother married director T. Hayes Hunter in Los Angeles in 1919. He graduated from Hollywood High School in 1927 and the family moved to England, where Hunter attended Trinity College, Cambridge. At Trinity, he was a member of the Cambridge University Amateur Dramatic Club and an editor of the college paper.

Hunter began his career while still a Trinity student, as a screenwriter for Smashing Through (1929) and an actor in Varsity (1930, as J. Evans Hunter). After graduating with Third-Class Honours he began a successful career as a screenwriter, most notably with Hammer Film Productions. He is best known for 1955's BAFTA nominated Carrington VC, starring David Niven and Noelle Middleton, and the controversial 1960 Never Take Sweets from a Stranger. Although Hunter married after leaving university, he was Guy Burgess's lover while they were both students at Cambridge. Subsequently divorced, his longtime partner Michael Ronan had served time in a British jail for his sexuality. Hunter died in London in 1984.

== Selected filmography ==
- Luck of the Turf (1936)
- Blind Folly (1939)
- The Rossiter Case (1951)
- Honeymoon Deferred (1951)
- Never Look Back (1952)
- The Intruder (1953)
- Carrington V.C. (1955)
- Behind the Mask (1958)
- Never Take Sweets from a Stranger (1960)
- The Pirates of Blood River (1962)
