= Neville Smith (actor) =

British screenwriter and actor (born 1940)

- Born: January 1940 (age 86); Liverpool, England

Neville Smith (born January 1940, in Liverpool) is a British screenwriter and actor who has contributed to numerous television productions, radio plays and movies.

After studying politics and history at Hull University Smith worked as a teacher. He became an announcer and from 1965, wrote for BBC Radio. He took part in a total of 57 radio dramas. In 1964 he made his TV acting debut in the premiere episode of the Granada–ITV comedy drama series Villains. He was also seen in an episode of the Doctor Who story The Reign of Terror. In 1968 he wrote his first screenplay, The Golden Vision, for the BBC TV series The Wednesday Play. In the following years he appeared in episodes of Cluff, Z-Cars, Thirty-Minute Theatre, Softly Softly, Her Majesty's Pleasure and The Wednesday Play. He appeared in Praise Marx and Pass the Ammunition (1968). In 1971 the film Gumshoe, based on Smith's eponymous novel, was the first big directing assignment for Stephen Frears. Smith also played a small role in the film, as Arthur, a character whom Eddie Ginley (played by Albert Finney) consults about the gun before entering Liverpool Docks.

In 1977 Smith wrote the screenplay for Apaches, a short public information film (government-funded documentary) directed by John Mackenzie, about the dangers to children playing on farms. In the late 1970s Smith played the protagonist in two television plays directed by Stephen Frears, Me! I'm Afraid of Virginia Woolf (1978) by Alan Bennett and Long Distance Information (1979), his play about the death of Elvis Presley. Smith's most recent appearances on screen have been in Wish You Were Here (1987) and in the TV film Friends in Space (1990).
