= The Conquest of Everest =

1953 film by George Lowe

- Original poster by James Boswell
- Directed by: George Lowe
- Written by: Louis MacNeice (commentary)
- Produced by: Leon Clore; John Taylor; Grahame Tharp
- Narrated by: Meredith Edwards
- Cinematography: George Lowe; John Noel; Tom Stobart
- Edited by: Adrian de Potier
- Music by: Arthur Benjamin
- Production companies: Countryman Films; Group 3
- Distributed by: British Lion Film Corporation
- Release date: 7 December 1953
- Running time: 78 minutes
- Country: United Kingdom
- Language: English
- Box office: £158,584 (UK)

The Conquest of Everest is a 1953 British Technicolor documentary film directed by George Lowe about various expeditions to the summit of Mount Everest. It was nominated for an Academy Award for Best Documentary Feature.

Cameraman Tom Stobart participated in the 1953 British Mount Everest expedition (as did George Lowe). After the successful second assault, Stobart told the descending party to provide no indication to the men waiting at the base that Edmund Hillary and Tenzing Norgay had succeeded until they were close enough for Stobart to catch the emotion of the moment on film.

== Reception ==
The Monthly Film Bulletin wrote: "As one expected, this film is good. It has been most skilfully edited and is often intensely moving."

== Home media ==
The Conquest of Everest was released on Region 0 DVD-R by Alpha Video on 28 January 2014.

== See also ==
- List of media related to Mount Everest
