= Tom Stobart =

British filmmaker (1914–1980)

Thomas Ralph Stobart OBE (10 March 1914 – 29 November 1980) was a British cameraman, film-maker and author, notable for having shot The Conquest of Everest, the official film of the 1953 British Mount Everest Expedition.

Stobart was born in Darlington and was educated at St Bees School near Whitehaven, Cumberland. He attended Sheffield University and Cambridge University where he studied zoology.

He made Army instructional films in India in World War II, went on a 1946 expedition to the Himalayas, and on an expedition to North Queensland. He made the official film of the 1949-50 Norwegian–British–Swedish Antarctic Expedition (NBSX). There was wider public interest in the Everest expedition, and a need for sponsors. Countryman Films Ltd was one of the 1953 expedition’s sponsors. On the expedition, John Hunt recalls him "recounting some thrilling if slightly improbable experience with wild game in Africa, or giving a vivid description of the Far South." He had a "seemingly endless repertoire of adventure stories". George Lowe had understudied him as a reserve photographer. Later he went on an expedition to find the Abominable Snowman. Two later films were Adventure On (1956) and The Great Monkey Ripoff (1979).

In 1957 he wrote an autobiographical account of his Everest trip: I Take Pictures for Adventure., also published as Adventurer's Eye. He also wrote two books on cookery: Herbs, spices and flavourings (1977), and Cook's Encyclopaedia: Ingredients and Processes (1980).

He collapsed and died of a heart attack at Hassocks railway station, West Sussex, on 29 November 1980, aged 66.

== See also ==
- Tom Stobart at IMDb
