= Blind Folly =

1939 British film by Reginald Denham

- Directed by: Reginald Denham
- Written by: John Hunter; H. F. Maltby
- Produced by: A. George Smith
- Starring: Clifford Mollison; Lilli Palmer; Leslie Perrins
- Cinematography: Geoffrey Faithfull
- Production company: Canterbury Films
- Distributed by: RKO Pictures
- Release date: 10 November 1939
- Running time: 78 minutes
- Country: United Kingdom
- Language: English
- Budget: £17,803

Blind Folly (also known as Money For Nothing) is a 1939 British comedy film directed by Reginald Denham and starring Clifford Mollison, Lilli Palmer, and Leslie Perrins. It was written by John Hunter and H. F. Maltby, and was made at Walton Studios as a quota quickie. A man inherits a nightclub that belonged to his brother but soon discovers that it is the headquarters for a dangerous criminal gang.

== Preservation status ==
The British Film Institute National Archive holds no stills or ephemera, and no film or video materials.

== Plot ==
George Bunyard lives with his overbearing Aunt Mona. When his brother Fred dies, George inherits ''The Toffee Apple," the London night club he owned. From Fred's secretary Valerie, George learns that Fred was a crook. A trio of crooks are after a diamond necklace hidden in the club. George outsmarts them, and ends up marrying Valerie.

== Cast ==
- Clifford Mollison as George Bunyard
- Lilli Palmer as Valerie
- Leslie Perrins as Deverell
- William Kendall as Raine
- Gus McNaughton as Professor Zozo
- Elliott Mason as Aunt Mona
- David Horne as Mr Steel
- Gertrude Musgrove as Agnes
- Roland Culver as Ford
- Anthony Holles as Louis
- Michael Ripper

== Reception ==
The Monthly Film Bulletin wrote: "Although this film has some amusing moments, it is for the most part tedious and far too long-drawn-out. Clifford Mollison is adequate as Bunyard, David Home provides an admirable cameo of an outwardly respectable but actually villainous lawyer, and Lilli Palmer makes an attractive heroine."

Kine Weekly wrote: "The actual plot is a little too slight to stand on its own feet, but the trimmings, which include bright cabaret scenes and fights and chases, are good and give it equilibrium. Between the two the film represents, in spite of its ample footage, adequate mass and industrial entertainment."
