= Gumshoe (film) =

1971 British black comedy by Stephen Frears

- UK release poster
- Directed by: Stephen Frears
- Written by: Neville Smith
- Produced by: Michael Medwin
- Starring: Albert Finney; Billie Whitelaw
- Cinematography: Chris Menges
- Edited by: Charles Rees
- Music by: Andrew Lloyd Webber
- Production company: Memorial Enterprises
- Distributed by: Columbia-Warner Distributors
- Release date: December 1971 (UK)
- Running time: 88 minutes
- Country: United Kingdom
- Language: English

Gumshoe is a 1971 British black comedy film directed (in his debut) by Stephen Frears and starring Albert Finney, Billie Whitelaw and Frank Finlay. It was written by Neville Smith. The film follows a bingo-caller who dreams of being a private eye.

== Plot ==
Eddie Ginley works at a bingo hall in Liverpool, England, but dreams of becoming a stylish private investigator like those he has read about and seen in films. After finally placing an advertisement in a local newspaper announcing his detective services, he receives a mysterious offer. Although Ginley is inexperienced and clueless in certain aspects of investigating, he soon realises that he is entangled in a serious case involving drugs, murder, and even his own family.

== Cast ==
- Albert Finney as Eddie Ginley
- Billie Whitelaw as Ellen
- Frank Finlay as William
- Janice Rule as Mrs Blankerscoon
- Carolyn Seymour as Alison
- Fulton Mackay as Straker
- Billy Dean as Tommy
- George Silver as De Fries
- George Innes as the bookshop proprietor
- Neville Smith as Arthur
- Bert King as Mal
- Ken Jones as the Labour Exchange clerk
- Maureen Lipman as Naomi
- Wendy Richard as Anne Scott
- Oscar James as Azinge
- Tom Kempinski as the psychiatrist

== Production ==
The film contains shots of Liverpool buildings that have long since been demolished, including the employment exchange on Leece Street. Several scenes in the London part of the narrative take place in and around the occult Atlantis Bookshop.

Gumshoe was the first of two films with original music scores by Andrew Lloyd Webber (the other was The Odessa File, in 1974). Some of the music used was originally written for Lloyd Webber's then-abandoned musical version of Sunset Boulevard; the music was restored to its original place when work on the musical was resumed years later. Roy Young recorded the song "Baby, You're Good For Me", written by Lloyd Webber and Tim Rice.

== Reception ==
The Monthly Film Bulletin wrote: "The easiest and most obvious thing to say about Gumshoe is that it is quietly and delightfully funny every inch of the way, all the more so because it never indulges in obvious pastiche, instead filtering its many echoes of the Forties thrillers through the pop-tinted glasses of the Presley Fifties as well as the sober horn-rims of reality. ... Gumshoe [is] an extraordinarily difficult film to review, mainly because its various levels are so closely dovetailed that any attempt to take them apart leaves one with limp, meaningless strands in one's hands. ...Everything in the film – Stephen Frears' first feature – is exactly right, from the throbbing Forties score down to the end of the cast list (with Fulton Mackay stealing any honours Finney leaves behind) and the brilliantly self-effacing direction; but its most remarkable achievement is perhaps that behind all the jokes and flurries, another Eddie peeps through, vulnerable, lonely and despairing. At the end, sitting with his hat tipped rakishly over his eyes listening to a rock-and-roll record, he is Sam Spade again; but nothing can quite efface the memory of the hurt, lost child whose brother melted down his toy soldiers to sell the lead and who was betrayed by the girl he loved."
