= George Silver (actor) =

English actor (1916–1984)

- Born: 14 November 1916; London, England, UK
- Died: 2 June 1984
- Occupation: Actor
- Years active: 1971 - 1983

George Silver (14 November 1916 – June 1984) was an English actor, born in London.

He was an actor, best known for The Meaning of Life (1983), Victor/Victoria (1982) and The Adventure of Sherlock Holmes' Smarter Brother (1975).

Because of his considerable body weight, Silver was often cast in parts where the preparation or consumption of food was a central activity, or where physical bulk was a major element of the characterisation. In Stephen Frears' 1971 'spoof-noir' thriller Gumshoe, his role was to play a modern approximation of the 1940s Sydney Greenstreet 'Fat Man' character.

Silver died in June, 1984.

== Filmography ==
| Year | Title | Role | Notes |
|---|---|---|---|
| 1971 | Gumshoe | De Fries | |
| 1974 | Murder on the Orient Express | Orient Express Chef | Uncredited |
| 1974 | The Man with the Golden Gun | Fat Beirut Thug | Uncredited |
| 1975 | The Sweeney - Supersnout. S2 E3 | Yannos | |
| 1975 | The Adventure of Sherlock Holmes' Smarter Brother | Bruner | |
| 1977 | Jabberwocky | Bandit Leader | |
| 1980 | The Mirror Crack'd | Da Silva | ('Murder at Midnight') |
| 1982 | Victor/Victoria | Fat Man Eating an Eclair | |
| 1983 | The Meaning of Life | Diner Eating Howard the Fish | |
