= Apaches (film) =

1977 British short film by John Mackenzie

- Written by: Neville Smith
- Directed by: John Mackenzie
- Starring: Robbie Oubridge; Ian Scrace; Wayne Tapsfield; Sharon Smart; Fion Smith; Louise O'Hara
- Country of origin: United Kingdom
- Original language: English

Production
- Producers: John Arnold; Leon Clore
- Cinematography: Phil Méheux
- Editor: Barney Greenwood
- Running time: 26 minutes
- Production companies: Graphic Films; Central Office of Information

Original release
- Release: February 1977

Apaches is a 1977 British short public information film directed by John Mackenzie, written by Neville Smith and produced by John Arnold and Leon Clore for the Central Office of Information (COI) for the Health and Safety Executive (HSE).

The 26-minute-long film deals with the subject of the dangers to students on farms, and has been seen in schools all over Britain, as well as Canada, Australia and the United States.

The film follows the misadventures of a group of six young children playing on a farm. It is narrated in-character by Danny.

== Plot ==
Six young children – Kim, Sharon, Michael, Danny, Tom and Robert – from a rural British village enjoy playing on a nearby farm pretending to be "Apache warriors".

Throughout the film, the children all die in various different accidents due to their carelessness: Kim is run over by a tractor that she was standing on after falling off of it, Tom drowns in a slurry pit that he falls into, Sharon dies from accidentally drinking chemicals while pretending it to be alcohol, Robert is crushed by a falling gate that Michael knocked over, and Danny crashes a tractor he is riding on into a ditch. Danny continues his narration after his death, and talks calmly about his family all arriving for a "party" being prepared earlier in the film.

Michael, also present, is revealed to be Danny's cousin – the only child not to have been killed by his own reckless behavior, despite Danny having described Michael as "daft". Danny's voice fades into a ghostly echo as he sadly says he wishes he could have gone to the party. The closing credits show a long list of real children and teenagers under 16 who had died in actual farm accidents in the year before Apaches was made.

== Cast ==
- Robbie Oubridge as Danny
- Ian Scrace as Michael
- Wayne Tapsfield as Robert
- Sharon Smart as Sharon
- Fion Smith as Tom
- Louise O'Hara as Kim

== Production ==
The film was shot on 16mm film at a Home Counties farm in February 1977, and child actors were selected from a school in Maidenhead, Berkshire.

== Release ==
It was shown extensively in the Southern, Westward, Anglia and ATV regions, before being shown either on film or videocassette in primary schools.

== Home viewing availability ==
Apaches was made available for home viewing by the BFI in 2010, along with other such Public Information Films of the time such as Building Sites Bite, on the compilation DVD COI Collection Vol 4: Stop! Look! Listen! The film was later included on the Blu-ray compilation The Best of the COI. It is also included on some DVD and BD releases of The Long Good Friday (also the work of director John Mackenzie and cinematographer Phil Méheux).

== See also ==
- Building Sites Bite
- The Finishing Line
