= Niall MacGinnis =

Irish actor (1913–1977)

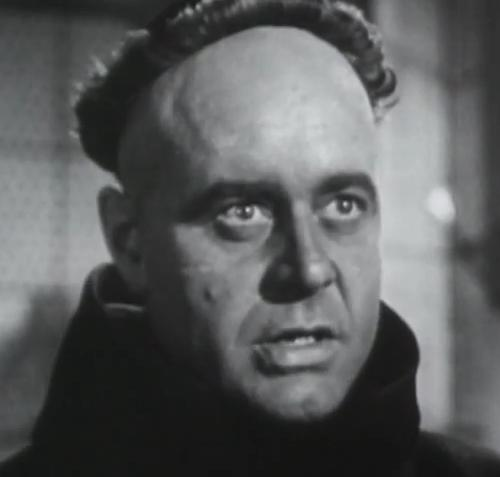
- MacGinnis as the title character in the film Martin Luther (1953)
- Born: Patrick Niall MacGinnis; 29 March 1913; Dublin, Ireland
- Died: 6 January 1977 (aged 63); Newport, Monmouthshire, Wales
- Education: Trinity College Dublin
- Occupations: Actor; physician
- Years active: 1935–1977
- Spouses: Sheila Macdonal (m. 1942, divorced) Eleonore MacGinnis (m. 1955)
- Children: 1

Patrick Niall MacGinnis (29 March 1913 – 6 January 1977) was an Irish actor and physician. On screen, he was well-known for his character roles with a "poetic timbre", though he occasionally played leading parts like the title character in Martin Luther (1953) and the occultist antagonist of the classic horror film Night of the Demon (1957). In theatre, he was an accomplished Shakespearean, and a member of the Old Vic Company.

== Early life and education ==
MacGinnis was born in the Ranelagh area of Dublin in 1913, the son of Mary Josephine (née Kelly) and Patrick F. MacGinnis. He was educated at Stonyhurst College, a Jesuit public school in Lancashire in the North of England, where he won prizes for elocution and played rugby and cricket. He studied medicine at Trinity College Dublin (TCD), qualifying as a house surgeon.

He practiced medicine in Dublin and London, before deciding to pursue an acting career, and enrolling in the classes at the Peacock Theatre, Dublin and the Sheffield Playgoers Society. He furthered his dramatic education at The Old Vic, under John Gielgud, and became well-versed in Shakespeare.

== Career ==
=== Theatre ===
MacGinnis made his professional debut with the Sheffield Repertory Theatre, on a tour of Ireland during the summer of 1932. He was a member of the Gate Theatre company between 1933 and 1934, and played the Ghost in Micheál Mac Liammóir's production of Hamlet, and reprised his role when the production moved to London. He made his West End debut in September 1934. His breakthrough as a stage actor came when he was cast as Mat Burke in Anna Christie with Flora Robson and Alexander Knox.

On the West End, he appeared in Volpone with Donald Wolfit, at the Westminster Theatre, and played Malcolm in Michel Saint-Denis's production of Macbeth at the Old Vic, with Laurence Olivier in the title role. In 1938, he played the lead role in the hit comedy play Spring Meeting, directed by John Gielgud. He appeared regularly in Old Vic productions, especially Shakespearean plays, and also performed with the Longford players during their 1937–8 London season.

=== Film ===
MacGinnis made his 1935 film debut in Turn of the Tide. His breakthrough role was as Andrew Gray in the 1937 Michael Powell film The Edge of the World. In 1941, he worked with Powell and Laurence Olivier again on the war film 49th Parallel, playing a German U-boat crew member. In 1944, he played Captain MacMorris opposite Olivier in Henry V.

However, that same year he put his acting career on hiatus to join the British Royal Navy as a surgeon. He served through the end of Second World War, until 1947, when he returned to acting in the film Captain Boycott.

In 1953, MacGinnis played the title character in the biographical film Martin Luther. The film was critically acclaimed and a large commercial success, earning multiple Academy Award nominations and appearing on the National Board of Review's Top Ten Films of 1953. One critic called MacGinnis' performance "magnificent... given reverential, straightforward, honest, sincere treatment, as well as eschewing anything savoring of sensationalism."

In 1957, MacGinnis played the villain Dr. Julian Karswell opposite American actor Dana Andrews in the classic British horror film Night of the Demon (initially released in the United States as Curse of the Demon). His role as a sinister-yet-charismatic occultist remains one of his most well-remembered among film fans. Another notable role was as Zeus in the 1963 fantasy film Jason and the Argonauts.

=== Television ===
On television, he played the arch-criminal A. J. Kent in the Danger Man episode "Battle of The Cameras" and Colonel Probst in The Saint episode "The Paper Chase".

== Personal life ==
During the late 1930s, MacGinnis lived on the River Thames on a houseboat converted out of a commercial sailer, the Hermoine.

In 1942, MacGinnis married Sheila Mcdonald; the couple later divorced. In 1955, he married his second wife Eleanor, with whom he had a daughter. In the mid-1970s, he gave up acting, moved back to his native Ireland, and returned to the medical profession. He lived in Ashford, County Wicklow.

== Death ==
MacGinnis died of cancer in Haverfordwest, Pembrokeshire, Wales, in January 1977, aged 63, where he had been working in a local clinic. At the time of his death, he was considering coming out of retirement to appear to narrate his old friend Michael Powell's film Return to the Edge of the World (1978).

His wife Eleanor remained in Ashford until her death in 2013. Their daughter and family still reside on the family property.

== Filmography ==
- Turn of the Tide (1935) – John Lunn
- The Crimson Circle (1936) – Jack Beardmore
- Debt of Honour (1936) – Lt. Peter Stretton
- Ourselves Alone (1936) – Terence Elliott
- The Luck of the Irish (1936) – Derek O'Neill
- The Edge of the World (1937) – The Gray Family: Andrew, His Son
- The Last Adventurers (1937) – Jeremy Bowker
- Spring Meeting (1938 TV movie) – Michael Byrne
- Mountains O'Mourne (1938) – Paddy Kelly
- East of Piccadilly (1941) – Joe
- 49th Parallel (1941) – Vogel
- The Day Will Dawn (1942) – Olaf
- We Dive at Dawn (1943) – Torpedo Gunner's Mate – C/P.O. Mike Corrigan
- Undercover (1943) – Dr. Jordon
- The Demi-Paradise (1943) – Man on ship-dedication stand (uncredited)
- The Hundred Pound Window (1944) – Chick Slater
- Tawny Pipit (1944) – Jimmy Bancroft
- Henry V (1944) – Macmorris – Irish Captain in the English Army
- Captain Boycott (1947) – Mark Killain
- Death at Newtownstewart (1948 TV movie) – District Inspector Montgomery
- Anna Karenina (1948) – Levin
- Hamlet (1948) – Sea Captain
- No Room at the Inn (1948) – O'Rane
- Christopher Columbus (1949) – Juan de la Cosa
- Diamond City (1949) – Hans Muller
- Which Will Ye Have? (1949 short) – Barabbas
- Chance of a Lifetime (1950) – Baxter
- Talk of a Million (1951) – Tom Cassidy
- No Highway in the Sky (1951) – Captain Samuelson, Pilot (uncredited)
- Murder in the Cathedral (1951) – Herald
- Martin Luther (1953) – Martin Luther
- Knights of the Round Table (1953) – Green Knight
- Hell Below Zero (1954) – Dr. Howe
- Conflict of Wings (1954) – Harry Tilney
- Betrayed (1954) – "Blackie"
- Special Delivery (1955) – Sidney
- Helen of Troy (1956) – Menelaus
- Alexander the Great (1956) – Parmenion
- Lust for Life (1956) – Roulin
- The Shiralee (1957) – Beauty Kelly
- Night of the Demon (1957) – Doctor Karswell
- She Didn't Say No! (1958) – James Casey
- Behind the Mask (1958) – Neil Isherwood
- The Nun's Story (1959) – Father Vermeuhlen (Leprosarium)
- Shake Hands with the Devil (1959) – Michael O'Leary
- Tarzan's Greatest Adventure (1959) – Kruger
- This Other Eden (1959) – Devereaux
- Kidnapped (1960) – Mr. Shuan
- Never Take Sweets from a Stranger (1960) – Defense Counsel
- A Terrible Beauty (1960) – Ned O'Neill
- In the Nick (1960) – Prison Governor
- Foxhole in Cairo (1960) – Radek
- Sword of Sherwood Forest (1960) – Friar Tuck
- Johnny Nobody (1961) – Defending Counsel Sullivan
- The Webster Boy (1962) – Headmaster
- Billy Budd (1962) – Nathaniel Graveling – Ship's Master, Rights of Man
- The Devil's Agent (1962) – Paul Vass
- The Playboy of the Western World (1963) – Old Mahon
- Jason and the Argonauts (1963) – Zeus
- The Man Who Finally Died (1963) – Brenner
- A Face in the Rain (1963) – Klaus
- Becket (1964) – Baron
- The Truth About Spring (1965) – Cleary
- The Spy Who Came In from the Cold (1965) – Checkpoint Charlie Guard
- The War Lord (1965) – Odins
- A Man Could Get Killed (1966) – Ship's Captain
- Island of Terror (1966) – Mr. Roger Campbell
- The Viking Queen (1967) – Tiberian
- Torture Garden (1967) – Dr. Silversmith
- The Shoes of the Fisherman (1968) – Capuchin friar
- Krakatoa, East of Java (1969) – Harbor Master
- Sinful Davey (1969) – Boots Simpson
- The Kremlin Letter (1970) – Erector Set
- Darling Lili (1970) – Von Hindenburg (uncredited)
- River of Mystery (1971 TV movie) – Garwood Drum
- The Mackintosh Man (1973) – Warder
- Crisis in Sun Valley (1978 TV movie) – James (final film role)
