= Never Take Sweets from a Stranger =

1960 British film by Cyril Frankel

- UK release poster
- Directed by: Cyril Frankel
- Screenplay by: John Hunter
- Based on: Stage play The Pony Cart by Roger Garis
- Produced by: Anthony Hinds; Michael Carreras; Anthony Nelson-Keys
- Starring: Gwen Watford; Patrick Allen; Felix Aylmer; Niall MacGinnis; Alison Leggatt; Bill Nagy
- Cinematography: Freddie Francis
- Edited by: Alfred Cox; James Needs
- Music by: Elisabeth Lutyens; John Hollingsworth
- Production company: Hammer Film Productions
- Distributed by: Columbia Pictures
- Release date: 4 March 1960
- Running time: 81 minutes
- Country: United Kingdom
- Language: English

Never Take Sweets from a Stranger (U.S. title: Never Take Candy from a Stranger) is a 1960 British thriller drama film directed by Cyril Frankel and starring Patrick Allen, Gwen Watford, Janina Faye and Felix Aylmer. The screenplay was by John Hunter based on the 1954 play The Pony Cart by Roger Garis. It was produced by Hammer Films (in "HammerScope"),

The twin themes of the film are paedophilia and child sexual abuse, and the way in which those with sufficient influence can corrupt and manipulate the legal system to evade responsibility for their actions. The film is regarded as bold and uncompromising for its time.

== Plot ==
The British Carter family (Peter, Sally and 9-year-old daughter Jean) have just moved to a small Canadian town, following Peter's appointment as school principal. One night, Jean appears restless and disturbed, and confides to her parents that earlier that day while playing in a local wood, she and her friend, Lucille, went into the house of an elderly man who asked them to remove their clothes and dance naked before him in return for some sweets, which they did and Jean doesn't believe they did anything wrong. But her parents are appalled by what they hear and decide to file a complaint. The accused man, Clarence Olderberry Sr., is the doyen of the wealthiest, most highly regarded and influential family in town, and feelings turn against the Carters as the townspeople close ranks against the newcomers. The police chief casts doubt on Jean's story, while Olderberry's son warns the Carters that if they pursue the matter through the legal system, he will ensure that Jean's evidence and trustworthiness will be torn to shreds in court.

The Carters do not back down, but when the case goes to trial, it is with an obviously stacked jury and in an atmosphere of extreme hostility towards the Carters. As threatened, the defence counsel proceeds to question Jean in a harrowing, bullying manner which leaves her confused, frightened and giving the impression of being an unreliable witness. Inevitably, Olderberry is acquitted.

The Carters realise that there can be no future for them in the town, and make plans to leave. Shortly before their departure, Jean goes out to ride her bicycle and meets Lucille. They are in the woods again when they see Olderberry approaching them, offering them a bag of sweets. He grabs hold of Jean's bicycle. This time forewarned, the girls run away in panic and come to a lake, dropping Lucille's shopping bag on the way, and they find a rowing boat in which they attempt to flee to the other side of the lake. However, the boat is still moored to the lakeshore, and Olderberry begins to pull it back in.

Meanwhile, Jean's bicycle is found and delivered to the police. The police chief finds out that Olderberry Sr. is missing. Suspecting foul play, the police search the woods for the missing girls, with Peter and Olderberry Jr. accompanying them. The police find Lucille's shopping bag. Olderberry Jr. finds his father's hat and attempts to hide it, but Peter catches him. Soon afterwards, the boat is found. The SAR dogs lead the police to a cabin, where Lucille is lying dead on the floor, and Olderberry Sr. is there, behaving strangely, his clothes disarrayed and with an insane expression on his face. Olderberry Jr. gazes shocked at his father, realising the girls were telling the truth. But there is no sign of Jean.

While Sally waits anxiously at home, word has spread all over town about the search for the girls and Olderberry. Many of the town residents gather in front of the Carters' house. The police arrive with Peter and Jean. Peter tells Sally that Jean managed to get away unharmed from Olderberry Sr. and was found wandering in the wood on the other side of the lake. Sally asks what happened to Lucille. Before Peter can answer, Olderberry Jr. approaches them, overwhelmed with guilt and remorse. He whimpers and repeatedly exclaims that his father killed Lucille, while the crowd listens to him silently. The police take him away and the crowd disperses.

== Cast ==
- Patrick Allen as Peter Carter
- Gwen Watford as Sally Carter
- Janina Faye as Jean Carter
- Felix Aylmer as Clarence Olderberry Sr
- Niall MacGinnis as defense counsel
- Michael Gwynn as prosecutor
- Alison Leggatt as Martha
- Bill Nagy as Clarence Olderberry Jr
- MacDonald Parke as judge
- Estelle Brody as Eunice Kalliduke
- Robert Arden as Tom Demarest
- Frances Green as Lucille
- John Bloomfield as foreman of jury

== Production ==
Despite its nominal Canadian setting, exterior filming for Never Take Sweets from a Stranger took place in Burnham and Black Park in Wexham, Buckinghamshire. Black Park was featured in numerous Hammer productions due to its atmospheric appearance on film and its proximity to Hammer's Bray Studios base.

This was the first film that Freddie Francis photographed for Hammer. Francis said: "it was quite a good film actually but no that was a nice film, I don't think it got a big showing, Hammer films never did really."

Janina Faye was auditioned originally for the Roger Garis stage play, but being only ten years old at the time, she was rejected as being too young for the subject matter; director Frankel insisted she be in the movie version however. Filming lasted from Sept. 14, 1959 until Oct. 30, 1959 at Bray and Black Park.

Bernard Robinson was Production Designer, Don Mingaye was the Art Director and Roy Ashton did Makeup. John Peverall and Ron Wall were assistant directors.

=== Alternate dialogue ===
There is some mild swearing in the original British print. It features a line from Patrick Allen's character around the 10-minute mark: "If he touched her, I swear I'll kill the bastard." In the U.S. prints (and the 2010 Icons of Suspense DVD), the word "swine" is used instead on the audio, also recorded by Allen, but the picture remains the same, and he can clearly still be seen to say "bastard".

=== Publicity ===
Some of the publicity chosen for the film (such as a promotional poster with an image of armed police with tracker dogs, and the tagline "A nightmare manhunt for maniac prowler!"), was misleading, as it implied a fugitive-on-the-run chase thriller. Hammer Studios boss James Carreras later commented: "Message pictures? I tried one: Never Take Sweets from a Stranger. Nobody bought it. I'm not an artist. I'm a businessman."

== Release ==
The film was screened in New York by head of Columbia Pictures Mike Frankovich in mid-February 1960, and the film was released in the UK on March 4, 1960. Columbia wasn't able to release it initially in the US, since the Production Code found the picture violated "the edict about the depiction of sexual perversion". It eventually was screened in a number of art houses in the US in 1961.

After its release the film quickly disappeared from view, and for many years remained little-known and rarely screened.

== Critical reception ==
In a contemporary review The Monthly Film Bulletin wrote: "Though ostensibly about the corruption of children, the main theme of this film is in fact the corruption of power. Good solid film material this, and as long as they keep to it John Hunter's screenplay (from Roger Garis's play The Pony Cart) brings out with satisfying economy and irony the various ways in which the townsfolk make it almost impossible for Carter to bring his daughter's case to court. But these qualities are not sustained. The writing is often skimpy; we are given very little about the old man, and Carters relationship with his wife is never made credible. More noticeably, the film's seriousness is dissipated in an unnecessarily horrible climax in which the old man chases the young girls through a wood. Lingering shots of Felix Aylmer shuffling through pine glades may make for good suspense, but they jar with the tone of the rest of the film. Much of the blame for this must lie with Cyril Frankel's direction, which isn't firm enough; and though his cast, which includes Gwen Watford and Niall MacGinnis, is a good one, he hasn't been able in general to discipline the acting. Only Alison Leggatt is restrained enough to make plausible her splendidly buoyant grandmother."

Also on the film's release, Variety said: "Gwen Watford and Patrick Allen, as the distraught parents, and Alison Leggatt, as a wise, understanding grandmother, lead a cast which is directed with complete sensitivity by Cyril Frankel. Both Watford and Allen are completely credible while Leggatt, well-served by John Hunter's script, is outstanding. Aylmer, who doesn't utter a word throughout the film, gives a terrifying acute study of crumbling evil."

In 1994 Christopher Lee noted: "Never Take Sweets from a Stranger, an excellent film, was decades ahead of its time."

The Radio Times Guide to Films gave the film 3/5 stars, writing: "An extremely audacious film for its time, this deals with the problem of paedophilia and builds towards a surprisingly grim and disturbing climax. ... It's made by Hammer Films, so the movie walks a tightrope between seriousness and sensation"

Filmink compared the film with Too Young to Love, released around the same time, and claimed Never Take Candy from a Stranger "shows how a cautionary tale should be done."

British film critic Leslie Halliwell said: "In the awful warning category, and rather predictable."

== Home media ==
In 2010 the film made its first appearance on DVD, in a US triple DVD collection called Icons of Suspense.

In 2021, Powerhouse Films released the restored Blu-ray version, along with many extras, interviews, and pdf material. (It's notable that in both the UK Sweets and US Candy versions of the film on the blu-ray, Patrick Allen's dialogue uses the softer word "swine" instead of the word "bastard" which was originally used in UK prints. The film is also copyrighted in the opening titles as MCMLIV i.e. 1954) In 2023, the film was shown on the British TV station Talking Pictures TV.
