= Building Sites Bite =

1978 public information film by David Hughes

- Directed by: David Hughes
- Produced by: Maggie Evans
- Starring: Stephanie Coles; Nigel Rhodes; David Mckail
- Cinematography: Bahram Manocheri
- Edited by: David Woodward
- Production company: Mighty Movie Company
- Release date: 1978
- Running time: 28 minutes
- Country: United Kingdom
- Language: English

Building Sites Bite is a 1978 British short public information film produced by the Central Office of Information for the Health and Safety Executive and the Mighty Movie Company for British schools to warn children about the dangers of playing on building sites. It was written and directed by David Hughes and produced by Maggie Evans. The film is 28 minutes in duration.

Building Sites Bite was filmed as part of a national campaign responding to the deaths of more than 20 children in 1977 in building-site accidents. Most of the actors are children. Because of the style of filming and grim subject matter, Building Sites Bite is often compared to the earlier films Apaches (1977) and The Finishing Line (1977).

== Plot ==
Ronald, a young boy, is visiting family with his mother, who is encouraging him to become a builder or surveyor when he grows up. His cousin Paul, who is aware of the risks present on building sites and does not believe Ronald to be as well informed, imagines a scenario in which he and his sister Jane test Ronald's common sense by teleporting him to various construction and demolition sites, where he must avoid several hazards and obstacles without getting hurt. In each test Ronald disobeys various warning signs and ignores the dangers, resulting in him getting killed in each one, before getting brought back to life to try again.

Each time Ronald is about to die a heartbeat sound is played. In order, Ronald is buried alive in a trench collapse, electrocuted in a condemned building, is run over by an earthmoving vehicle, breaks his skull against a metal retaining wall, is crushed to death by a pile of bricks and finally is stranded over water in a disused quarry. Eventually, Ronald's cousins tell him that he should have simply refused to go on to the sites and avoided needlessly endangering himself in the first place, before Paul lures him to his death once again.

Paul is snapped out of his daydream by the end of the visit. Over the closing shot of the film, Paul reads out real-life stories of children who were killed in similar ways to those seen in the film.

== Cast ==
- Stephanie Cole as Auntie
- Nigel Rhodes as Ronald
- David Mckail as dad
- Jo Kendall as mum
- Miranda Hunnisett as Jane
- Terry Russell as Paul

== Reception ==
In 2020 Bob Fischer write in Fortean Times: "Sensible Paul and Jane are visited by posh-but-dim cousin Ronald. 'I reckon he's a twit...' muses Paul, and employs comprehensively grim methods to prove it. Imagining himself and his sister as silver-suited cosmic overlords, he inflicts multiple imaginary deaths on his cravat-sporting nemesis by transporting him (via a garden shed TARDIS) to a succession of deserted building sites. Here, exposed electrical cables and collapsing walls repeatedly nudge Ronald from an increasingly thankless mortal coil."

== Home media ==
Building Sites Bite was released by the BFI on the DVD COI Collection Vol 4: Stop! Look! Listen!, which also included other contemporary public information films such as Apaches. The film was also later re-released in a similar compilation, The Best Of COI. Five Decades of Public Information Films (2020).
