= Julian Weinstock =

- Born: c. 1922
- Died: 1993
- Education: Washington University in St. Louis
- Occupations: Architect, real estate contractor, philanthropist
- Spouse: Lois Weinstock
- Children: 3 sons, 2 daughters

Julian Weinstock (c. 1922-1993) was an American architect, real estate contractor and philanthropist from Los Angeles, California. He built thousands of home in the San Fernando Valley and developed large areas of Bel Air.

== Early life ==
Julian Weinstock was born circa 1922. He studied architecture at the Washington University in St. Louis.

== Career ==
Weinstock moved to Southern California in the late 1940s, where he started his career as an architect.

After designing a home in the Hollywood Hills, he became a real estate contractor and founded Julian Weinstock Construction Co., a real estate construction company. He built thousands of homes in the San Fernando Valley, including Oakwood Heights in Thousand Oaks, California. He also built homes and apartment buildings in Los Feliz, the Sunset Strip and Beverly Hills. He built the first high-rise residential building in Los Angeles: Doheny Plaza in West Hollywood.

He developed properties along the Sepulveda Pass in Bel Air, where now stand the American Jewish University, the Stephen S. Wise Temple, the Bel Air Presbyterian Church, the Leo Baeck Temple, Hebrew Union College and the Beverly Crest Estates.

== Philanthropy ==
He made charitable contributions to the American Jewish University, Cedars-Sinai Medical Center, the United Jewish Fund, and Vista del Mar. He was a member of the Society of Fellows of American Jewish University.

== Personal life ==
He was married to Evelyn and then Lois Weinstock. He had three sons, Brian, Bradley and Darren, and two daughters, Elaine and Elisabeth.

== Death ==
He died in 1993.
