= The Palestinian =

1977 television documentary by Roy Battersby

- Directed by: Roy Battersby
- Produced by: Vanessa Redgrave
- Narrated by: Vanessa Redgrave
- Cinematography: Samir Nimer; Ivan Strasburg; Graham Whittaker
- Edited by: Tom Scott Robson
- Music by: Abu Jaffer; Mustapha Kord
- Production companies: Yabayay Media; Antipode films
- Release date: 1977
- Running time: 66 minutes
- Languages: Arabic; Hebrew; English

The Palestinian (Arabic: الفلسطيني) is a 66-minute TV documentary from 1977. It was produced by and starred Vanessa Redgrave, and directed by Roy Battersby.

== Plot ==
The documentary is about the PLO (Palestine Liberation Organization) and the ongoing Israeli–Palestinian conflict. The film features an interview with Yasser Arafat, the chairman of the PLO, as well as testimonies from the survivors of the Tel al-Zaatar massacre.

== Production ==
In an interview with Adam Higginbotham for the Daily Telegraph in 2012, Vanessa Redgrave revealed that she funded the documentary by selling her house that she shared with her three children, Natasha Richardson, Joely Richardson, and Carlo Gabriel Nero.

== Release ==
The documentary was first screened for television producers in New York City in October 1977.

== Controversy ==
When attempting to put The Palestinian on television, Redgrave contacted Joey Adams for some assistance. Adams, who was Jewish, was reportedly so upset that he not only hung up on Redgrave, but told outlets such as The New York Post and The Jewish Week about the phone call. Adams alleged that Redgrave said Israel was a "fascist nation and must be dismantled if peace is to come to the Middle East". In a call with the Chicago Sun-Times, Redgrave said those were Yasser Arafat's words and not her's. Alfred Lilienthal, in his book The Zionist Connection, wrote that the first part of the quote was her lingo – but the second part of the quote wasn't.

Upon release, the documentary was perceived by some critics as anti-Israeli. The Anti-Defamation League's honorary chairman criticised the film, stating that some of the responses of the people she interviews weren't translated from Arabic, that the film showed children training with guns and that the phrase, "Kill the enemy!" kept being repeated. Theodore Bikel, the president of Actors Equity in the United States said he had read the script and mentioned the film's interview with Arafat, in which Arafat said that the only solution to the Middle East problem is the liquidation of the State of Israel, and Redgrave responded with, "Certainly".

=== Redgrave at the 50th Academy Awards ===
Redgrave won the Academy Award for Best Supporting Actress for her role in Julia. Her nomination drew attention and criticism, and the ceremony was picketed by both the Jewish Defense League (JDL) and counter-protesters waving PLO flags. In her acceptance speech at the Oscars, Redgrave made a short speech, saying "In the last few weeks you have stood firm and you have refused to be intimidated by the threat of a small bunch of Zionist hoodlums, whose behaviour is an insult to the stature of Jews all over the world, and to their great and heroic record of struggle against fascism and oppression". Regarding her use of the phrase "Zionist hoodlums", the Daily Telegraph later said, "It's clear now that she was referring to the extremists of the Jewish Defense League who had offered a bounty to have her killed. Academy Award winner Paddy Chayefsky responded later during the ceremony while presenting an award, saying "if I expect to live with myself tomorrow morning" he had to address the ceremony being exploited for politics.

=== Theatre bombing ===
Later that year, at 4:26 a.m on 15 June 1978, a bomb exploded in front of the Doheny Plaza theatre in Los Angeles, where the film was scheduled to open later that evening. The opening was postponed by a day. A member of the Jewish Defense League was later convicted of the bombing, and sentenced to a three-month "thorough psychological examination" with the California Youth Authority followed by a further sentence of up to four years in the California Youth Authority.
