= Vanessa Redgrave =

British actress and activist (born 1937)

Dame Vanessa Redgrave DBE
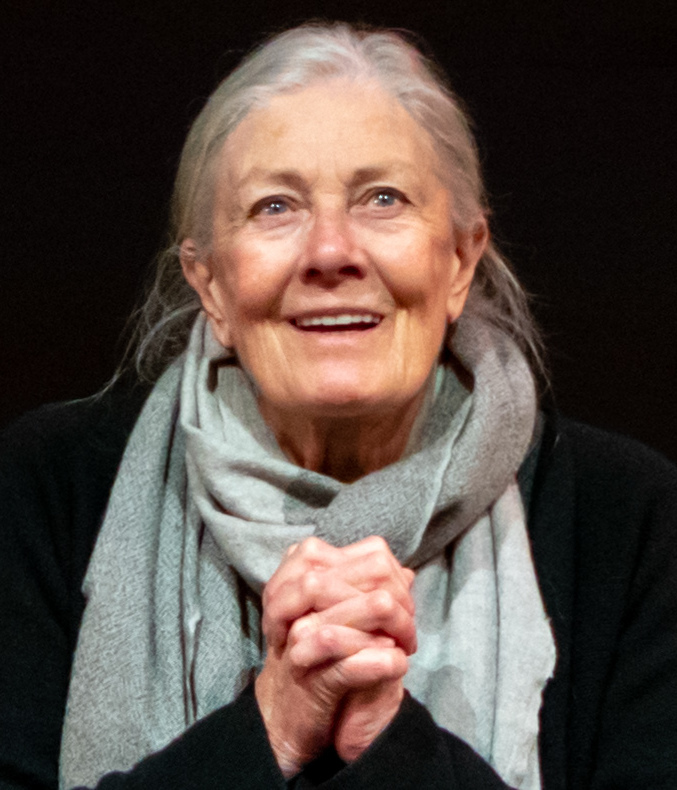
- Redgrave in 2019
- Born: 30 January 1937 (age 89); Blackheath, London, England
- Education: Royal Central School of Speech and Drama
- Occupations: Actress; political activist
- Years active: 1957–present
- Notable work: Filmography
- Spouses: Tony Richardson (m. 1962; div. 1967); Franco Nero (m. 2006)
- Partner: Timothy Dalton (1971–1986)
- Children: Natasha Richardson; Joely Richardson; Carlo Gabriel Nero
- Parents: Michael Redgrave; Rachel Kempson
- Family: Redgrave
- Awards: Full list

Dame Vanessa Redgrave (born 30 January 1937) is a British actress and activist. In a career spanning eight decades, her accolades include an Academy Award, two Golden Globes, two Primetime Emmy Awards, Laurence Olivier Award, a Tony Award, a Volpi Cup, and two Cannes Film Festival Award for Best Actress, making her one of the few performers to achieve the Triple Crown of Acting. She has also received various honorary awards, including the BAFTA Fellowship Award, the Golden Lion Honorary Award, and an induction into the American Theatre Hall of Fame.

Redgrave made her acting debut on stage with the production of A Touch of Sun in 1958. She rose to prominence in 1961 playing Rosalind in the Shakespearean comedy As You Like It with the Royal Shakespeare Company, and has since starred in numerous productions in the West End and on Broadway. She won the Olivier Award for Best Actress in a Revival for The Aspern Papers (1984), and received nominations for A Touch of the Poet (1988), John Gabriel Borkman (1997), and The Inheritance (2019). She also won the Tony Award for Best Actress in a Play for the revival of Long Day's Journey into Night (2003), and was nominated for The Year of Magical Thinking (2007) and Driving Miss Daisy (2011).

Redgrave made her film debut co-starring with her father in the 1958 medical drama Behind the Mask. She rose to prominence as a film actor with the satire Morgan – A Suitable Case for Treatment (1966), which garnered her first of her six Academy Award nominations, winning Best Supporting Actress for Julia (1977). Her other nominations are for Isadora (1968), Mary, Queen of Scots (1971), The Bostonians (1984), and Howards End (1992). Her other films include A Man for All Seasons (1966), Blowup (1966), Camelot (1967), The Devils (1971), Murder on the Orient Express (1974), Agatha (1979), Prick Up Your Ears (1987), Mission: Impossible (1996), Venus (2006), Atonement (2007), Coriolanus (2011), and Foxcatcher (2014).

A member of the Redgrave family of actors, she is the daughter of Sir Michael Redgrave and Rachel Kempson, the sister of Lynn Redgrave and Corin Redgrave, the wife of Italian actor Franco Nero, the mother of actresses Joely Richardson and Natasha Richardson and screenwriter and director Carlo Gabriel Nero, the aunt of British actress Jemma Redgrave, the mother-in-law of actor Liam Neeson and film producer Tim Bevan, and the grandmother of Daisy Bevan, Micheál Richardson and Daniel Neeson.

== Early years and education ==
Vanessa Redgrave was born on 30 January 1937 in Blackheath, London, the daughter of actors Sir Michael Redgrave and Rachel Kempson. Laurence Olivier announced her birth to the audience at a performance of Hamlet at the Old Vic, when he said that Laertes (played by Sir Michael) had a daughter. Accounts say Olivier announced, "A great actress has been born this night."

In her autobiography, Redgrave recalls the East End and Coventry Blitzes among her earliest memories. Following the East End Blitz, Redgrave relocated with her family to Bromyard, Herefordshire, before returning to London in 1943. She was educated at two independent schools for girls: the Alice Ottley School in Worcester, and Queen's Gate School in London, before "coming out" as a debutante. Her siblings Lynn Redgrave and Corin Redgrave were also actors.

== Career ==
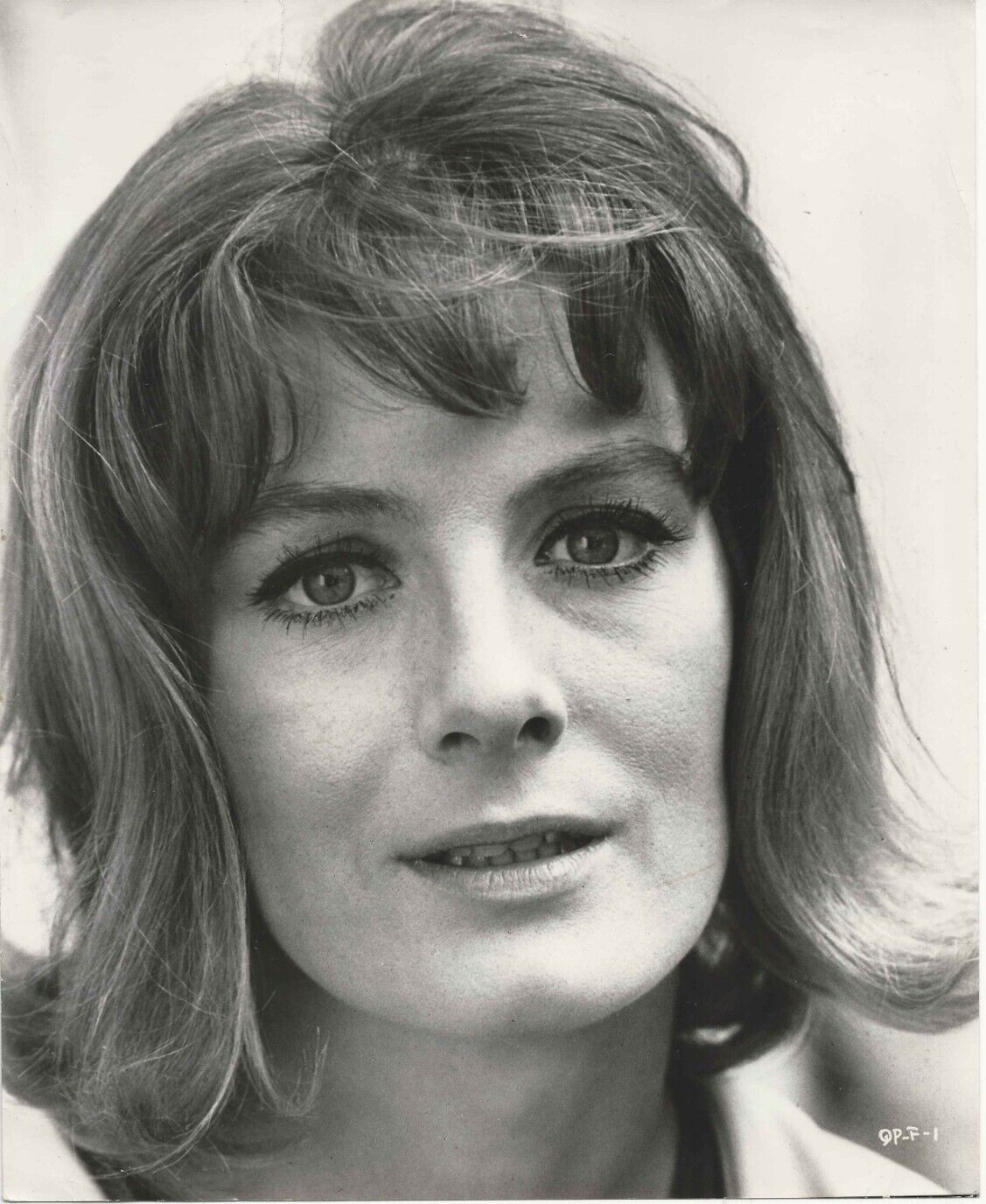
Redgrave c.1970.

=== Early stage and film career ===
Vanessa Redgrave entered the Central School of Speech and Drama in 1954. She first appeared in the West End, playing opposite her brother, in 1958.

In 1959, Redgrave appeared at the Shakespeare Memorial Theatre under the direction of Peter Hall as Helena in A Midsummer Night's Dream opposite Charles Laughton as Bottom and Coriolanus opposite Laurence Olivier (in the title role), Albert Finney and Edith Evans.

In 1960, Redgrave had her first starring role in Robert Bolt's The Tiger and the Horse, in which she co-starred with her father. In 1961, she played Rosalind in As You Like It for the Royal Shakespeare Company. In 1962, she played Imogen in William Gaskill's production of Cymbeline for the RSC. In 1966, Redgrave created the role of Jean Brodie in the Donald Albery production of The Prime of Miss Jean Brodie, adapted for the stage by Jay Presson Allen from the novel by Muriel Spark.

Redgrave had her first credited film role, in which she co-starred with her father, in Brian Desmond Hurst's Behind the Mask (1958). Redgrave's first starring film role was in Morgan – A Suitable Case for Treatment (1966), co-starring David Warner and directed by Karel Reisz, for which she received an Oscar nomination, a Cannes award, a Golden Globe nomination and a BAFTA Film Award nomination. Following this, she portrayed a mysterious woman in Blowup (1966). Co-starring David Hemmings, it was the first English-language film of the Italian director Michelangelo Antonioni. Reunited with Karel Reisz for the biographical film of dancer Isadora Duncan in Isadora (1968), her portrayal of Duncan led her gaining a National Society of Film Critics' Award for Best Actress, a second Prize for the Best Female Performance at the Cannes Film Festival, along with a Golden Globe and an Oscar nomination. In 1970 and 1971, Vanessa was directed by Italian filmmaker Tinto Brass in two films: Dropout and La vacanza. In the same period came other portrayals of historical (or semi-mythical) figures – ranging from Andromache in The Trojan Women (1971) to the lead in Mary, Queen of Scots (1971), the latter earning her a third Oscar nomination. She also played the role of Guinevere in the film Camelot (1967) with Richard Harris and Franco Nero, and briefly as Sylvia Pankhurst in Oh! What a Lovely War (1969). She portrayed the character of Mother Superior Jeanne des Anges (Joan of the Angels) in The Devils (1971), the once controversial film directed by Ken Russell.

=== Julia (1977) ===
In the film Julia (1977), she starred in the title role as a woman murdered by the Nazi German regime in the years prior to World War II for her anti-Fascist activism. Her co-star in the film was Jane Fonda (playing writer Lillian Hellman). In her 2005 autobiography, Fonda wrote that:

...There is a quality about Vanessa that makes me feel as if she resides in a netherworld of mystery that eludes the rest of us mortals. Her voice seems to come from some deep place that knows all suffering and all secrets. Watching her work is like seeing through layers of glass, each layer painted in mythic watercolour images, layer after layer, until it becomes dark, but even then you know you haven't come to the bottom of it ... The only other time I had experienced this with an actor was with Marlon Brando ... Like Vanessa, he always seemed to be in another reality, working off some secret, magnetic, inner rhythm.

When Redgrave was nominated for an Academy Award for Best Supporting Actress in 1977 for her role in Julia, members of the Jewish Defense League (JDL), led by Rabbi Meir Kahane, burned effigies of Redgrave and picketed the Academy Awards ceremony to protest against what they saw as her support for the Palestine Liberation Organization.

This film opened in 1977, the same year she produced and appeared in the film The Palestinian, which followed the activities of the Palestine Liberation Organization (PLO) in Lebanon. The film was criticised by many Jewish groups for its perceived slant on Israel's occupation, and members of the Jewish Defense League (JDL) picketed Redgrave's nomination outside the Academy Awards ceremony while counter-protestors waved PLO flags. Redgrave won the Oscar and in her acceptance speech, she thanked Hollywood for having "refused to be intimidated by the threats of a small bunch of Zionist hoodlums – whose behaviour is an insult to the stature of Jews all over the world and to their great and heroic record of struggle against fascism and oppression". Her remarks received an on-stage response later in the ceremony from Academy Award–winning screenwriter Paddy Chayefsky, that year's award presenter, who said, "I would like to suggest to Miss Redgrave that her winning an Academy Award is not a pivotal moment in history, does not require a proclamation and a simple 'Thank you' would've sufficed." In his biography of Redgrave, Dan Callahan wrote, "The scandal of her awards speech and the negative press it occasioned had a destructive effect on her acting opportunities that would last for years to come".

=== Later career ===
==== Film and television ====
Later film roles include those of Agatha Christie in Agatha (1979), Helen in Yanks (1979), a Holocaust survivor in Playing for Time (1980), Leenie Cabrezi in My Body, My Child (1982), The Queen in Sing, Sing (1983), suffragist Olive Chancellor in The Bostonians (1984, a fourth Best Actress Academy Award nomination), transsexual tennis player Renée Richards in Second Serve (1986), Blanche Hudson in the television remake of What Ever Happened to Baby Jane (1991), Mrs Wilcox in Howards End (1992, her sixth Academy Award nomination, this time in a supporting role); arms dealer Max in Mission: Impossible (1996, when discussing the role of Max, Brian DePalma and Tom Cruise thought it would be fun to cast an actor like Redgrave; they then decided to go with the real thing); Oscar Wilde's mother in Wilde (1997); Clarissa Dalloway in Mrs Dalloway (1997); and Dr Sonia Wick in Girl, Interrupted (1999). Many of these roles and others garnered her widespread accolades.

Her performance as a lesbian mourning the loss of her longtime partner in the HBO series If These Walls Could Talk 2 (2000) earned her a Golden Globe for Best TV Series Supporting Actress, as well as earning an Emmy Award for Outstanding Supporting Actress in a TV Film or Miniseries. This same performance also led to an Excellence in Media Award from the Gay & Lesbian Alliance Against Defamation (GLAAD). In 2004, Redgrave joined the second-season cast of the FX series Nip/Tuck, portraying Dr Erica Noughton, the mother of Julia McNamara, who was played by her real-life daughter Joely Richardson. She also made appearances in the third and sixth seasons. In 2006, Redgrave starred opposite Peter O'Toole in the film Venus. A year later, Redgrave starred in Evening and Atonement, in which she received a Broadcast Film Critics Association award nomination for a performance that took up only seven minutes of screen time.

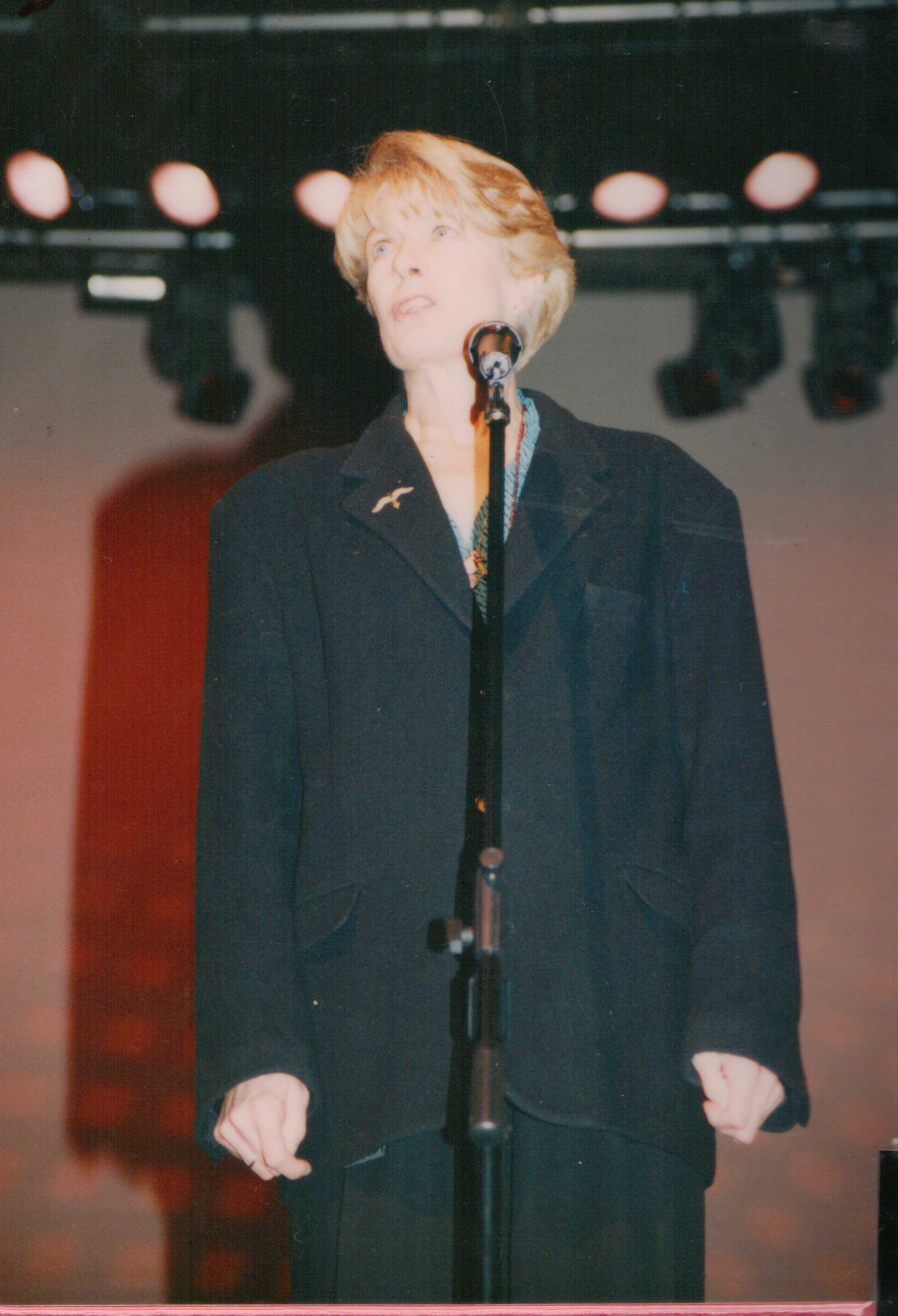
Redgrave in 1994.

In 2008, Redgrave appeared as a narrator in an Arts Alliance production, id – Identity of the Soul. In 2009, Redgrave starred in the BBC remake of The Day of the Triffids, with her daughter Joely. In the midst of losing her daughter, Natasha Richardson, Redgrave signed on to play Eleanor of Aquitaine in Ridley Scott's version of Robin Hood (2010), which began filming shortly after Natasha's death. Redgrave later withdrew from the film for personal reasons. The part was given to her Evening co-star Eileen Atkins. She was next seen in Letters to Juliet opposite her husband Franco Nero.

She had small roles in Eva (2009), a Romanian drama film that premiered at the 2010 Cannes Film Festival, as well as in Julian Schnabel's Palestinian drama Miral (2010), which was screened at the 67th Venice International Film Festival. She voiced the character of Winnie the Giant Tortoise in the environmental animated film Animals United (also 2010), and played a supporting role in the Bosnia-set political drama, The Whistleblower (2010), which premiered at the Toronto International Film Festival. Redgrave also narrated Patrick Keiller's semi-fictional documentary, Robinson in Ruins (2010). Since 2012, Redgrave has narrated voiceovers that are featured at the beginning and end of episodes of the BBC series Call The Midwife.

She also played leading roles in two historical films: Shakespeare's Coriolanus (which marked actor Ralph Fiennes' directorial debut), in which she plays Volumnia; and Roland Emmerich's Anonymous (both 2011), as Queen Elizabeth I.

Subsequently, she starred with Terence Stamp and Gemma Arterton in the British comedy-drama Song for Marion (US: Unfinished Song, 2012) and with Forest Whitaker in The Butler (2013), directed by Lee Daniels. She also appeared with Steve Carell and Channing Tatum in the drama Foxcatcher (2014).

In 2017, at the age of 80, Redgrave made her directorial debut with the feature documentary Sea Sorrow, which covers the plight of child migrants in the Calais refugee camps and the broader European migrant crisis. It premiered at the 2017 Cannes Film Festival. Critics praised the documentary's message but criticised the structure for a "scattershot lack of focus" and the "ungainliness of its production values".

In June 2024, principal photography was completed on The Estate, a feature drama, executive produced by Redgrave, her husband Franco Nero, and son Carlo Gabriel Nero. The film is written and directed by her son, and stars Redgrave and Franco Nero. The Estate will premiere in November, 2025 at the 43rd Torino Film Festival, where Redgrave will be presented with a Lifetime Achievement Award.

In September 2026, Redgrave joined the voice cast of the upcoming animated film The Turning Door.

==== Theatre ====
Redgrave won four Evening Standard Awards for Best Actress in four decades. She was awarded the Laurence Olivier Award for Actress of the Year in a Revival in 1984 for The Aspern Papers.

In 2000, her theatre work included Prospero in The Tempest at Shakespeare's Globe in London. In 2003, she won a Tony Award for Best Actress in a Play for her performance in the Broadway revival of Eugene O'Neill's Long Day's Journey Into Night. In January 2006, Redgrave was presented the Ibsen Centennial Award for her "outstanding work in interpreting many of Henrik Ibsen's works over the last decades". Previous recipients of the award include Liv Ullmann, Glenda Jackson and Claire Bloom.

In 2007, Redgrave played Joan Didion in her Broadway stage adaptation of her 2005 book, The Year of Magical Thinking, which played 144 regular performances in a 24-week limited engagement at the Booth Theatre. For this, she won the Drama Desk Award for Outstanding One-Person Show and was nominated for the Tony Award for Best Performance by a Leading Actress in a Play. She reprised the role at the Lyttelton Theatre at the Royal National Theatre in London to mixed reviews. She also spent a week performing the work at the Theatre Royal in Bath in September 2008. She once again performed the role of Joan Didion for a special benefit at Cathedral of St. John the Divine in New York City on 26 October 2009. The performance was originally slated to debut on 27 April, but was pushed due to the death of Redgrave's daughter Natasha. The proceeds for the benefit were donated to the United Nations Children's Fund (UNICEF) and the United Nations Relief and Works Agency (UNRWA). Both charities work to provide help for the children of Gaza.

In October 2010, she starred in the Broadway premiere of Driving Miss Daisy starring in the title role opposite James Earl Jones. The show premiered on 25 October 2010 at the John Golden Theatre in New York City to rave reviews. The production was originally scheduled to run to 29 January 2011 but due to a successful response and high box office sales, was extended to 9 April 2011. In May 2011, she was nominated for a Tony Award for Best Performance by a Leading Actress in a Play for the role of Daisy in Driving Miss Daisy. The play transferred to the Wyndham's Theatre in London from 26 September to 17 December 2011.

In 2013, Redgrave starred alongside Jesse Eisenberg in Eisenberg's The Revisionist. The New York production ran from 15 February to 27 April. Redgrave played a Polish Holocaust survivor in the play. In September 2013, Redgrave once again starred opposite James Earl Jones in a production of Much Ado About Nothing at The Old Vic, London, directed by Mark Rylance.

In 2016, Redgrave played Queen Margaret in Richard III with Ralph Fiennes in the title role, at the Almeida Theatre, London.

In February 2022, it was confirmed that she would be playing Mrs Higgins in My Fair Lady at the London Coliseum from May to August 2022.

In a poll of "industry experts" and readers conducted by The Stage in 2010, Redgrave was ranked as the ninth greatest stage actor/actress of all time.

== Personal life ==
Redgrave was married to film and theatre director Tony Richardson from 1962 to 1967; the couple had two daughters: actresses Natasha Richardson (1963–2009), and Joely Richardson (b. 1965). In 1967, the year Redgrave divorced Richardson, who left her for the French actress Jeanne Moreau, she became romantically involved with Italian actor Franco Nero when they met on the set of Camelot. In 1969, they had a son, Carlo Gabriel Redgrave Sparanero (known professionally as Carlo Gabriel Nero), a screenwriter and director. From 1971 to 1986, she had a long-term relationship with actor Timothy Dalton, with whom she had appeared in the film Mary, Queen of Scots (1971). Redgrave later reunited with Franco Nero, and they married on 31 December 2006. Carlo Nero directed Redgrave in The Fever (2004), a film adaptation of the Wallace Shawn play. Redgrave has six grandchildren.

Within 14 months in 2009 and 2010, Redgrave lost both a daughter and her two younger siblings. Her daughter Natasha Richardson died on 18 March 2009 from a traumatic brain injury caused by a skiing accident. On 6 April 2010, her brother, Corin Redgrave, died, and on 2 May 2010, her sister, Lynn Redgrave, died.

Redgrave had a near-fatal heart attack in April 2015. In September 2015, she revealed that her lungs are working at only 30 percent capacity due to emphysema caused by years of smoking.

Redgrave has described herself as a person of faith and said that she "sometimes" attends a Catholic church.

== Activism ==
In 1961, Vanessa Redgrave was an active member of the Committee of 100 and its working group. Redgrave and her brother Corin joined the Workers Revolutionary Party (WRP) in the 1970s. She stood for parliament several times as a party member but never received more than a few hundred votes. The party splintered in 1985 amid allegations that chairman Gerry Healy was implicated in sexual abuse of female supporters.

On 17 March 1968, Redgrave participated in the anti-Vietnam War protest outside the United States Embassy in Grosvenor Square. She was permitted to enter the embassy to deliver a protest.

Redgrave used her wage from Mary, Queen of Scots to build a nursery school near her home in west London. She donated the school to the state.

After the 1973 Old Bailey bombing, Redgrave volunteered to post bond for the defendants and offered up her own house in West Hampstead, should any of them need a place to stay. None of the defendants were released from custody to take her up on her offer.

In 1977, Redgrave produced and starred in a controversial documentary film, The Palestinian, about the activities of the Palestine Liberation Organization (PLO). She funded the documentary by selling her house. The pro-Israel Anti-Defamation League's honorary chairman criticised the film, saying that some of the responses of the people she interviews were not translated from Arabic, that the film showed children training with guns and that the phrase, "Kill the enemy!" kept being repeated. The president of Actors Equity in the United States said he had seen a transcript of the film's interview with the chairman of the PLO, Yasser Arafat, in which Arafat said that the only solution to the Middle East problem is the liquidation of the State of Israel, and Redgrave responded with, "Certainly". In June 1978, at the Doheny Plaza theatre showing the film, a bomb exploded, causing damage to property, but screening of the film resumed the following day. Two months later, a Jewish Defense League member was convicted of the bombing and sentenced to a three-month "thorough psychological examination" with the California Youth Authority. In a 2018 interview, Redgrave stood by her acceptance speech (which included the "Zionist hoodlums" remark) during the 1978 Academy Awards ceremony.

In 1977, Redgrave offered a resolution asking the British actors union to boycott Israel, allegedly including the selling of any taped material. The resolution was reportedly not brought to a vote.

In 1980, Redgrave made her American TV debut as concentration camp survivor Fania Fénelon in the Arthur Miller-scripted TV movie Playing for Time, a part for which she won an Emmy as Outstanding Lead Actress in 1981. The decision to cast Redgrave as Fénelon was, however, a source of controversy. In light of Redgrave's support for the Palestine Liberation Organization (PLO), Fénelon herself and the Jewish groups the Simon Wiesenthal Center, the Anti-Defamation League, and the American Jewish Congress objected to Redgrave's casting. Rabbi Marvin Hier of the Simon Wiesenthal Center wrote in a telegram that, "Your selection shows utter callous disregard of the tens of thousands of survivors for whom Miss Redgrave's portrayal would desecrate the memory of the martyred millions. Your decision could only be compared to selecting J. Edgar Hoover to portray Martin Luther King Jr." Producer David L. Wolper, in a telephone interview, compared it to letting the head of the Ku Klux Klan play a sympathetic white man in Roots, a miniseries about the slave trade. Miller said "She's a Marxist; this is a political matter. Turning her down because of her ideas was unacceptable to me; after all I suffered the blacklist myself".

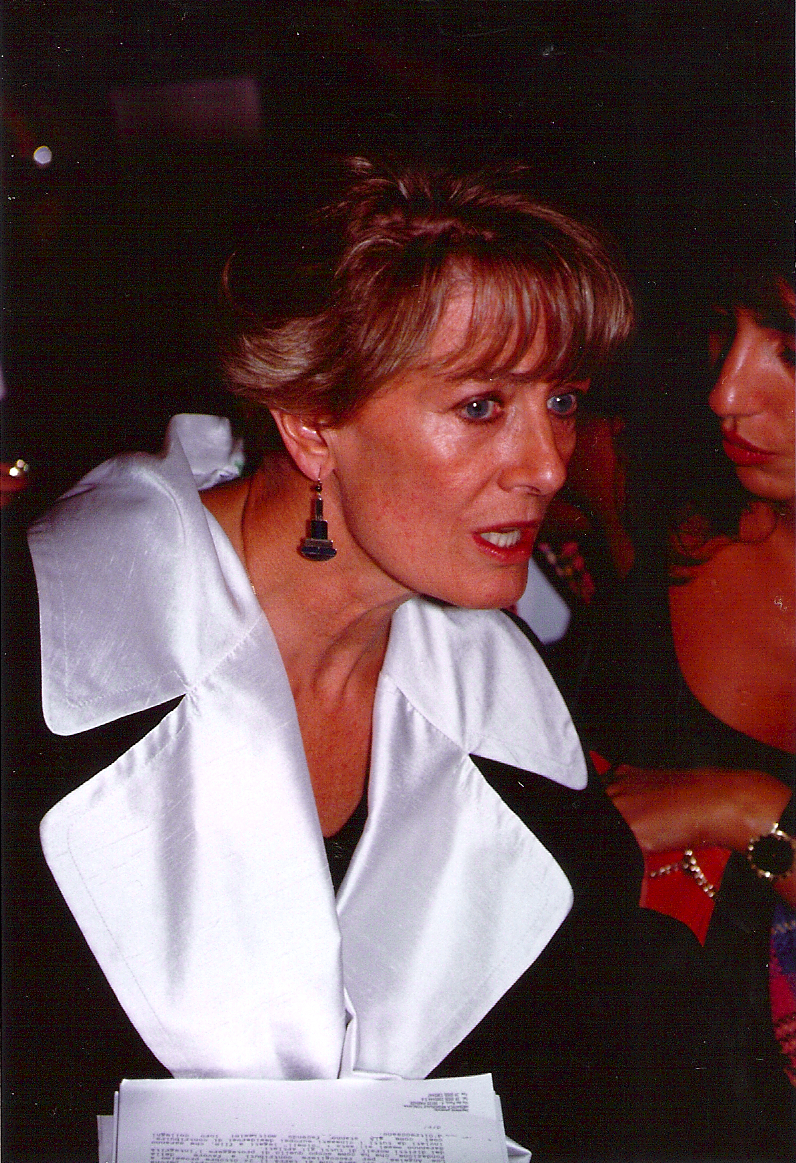
Redgrave c. 1981.

In 1984, Redgrave sued the Boston Symphony Orchestra, claiming that the orchestra had fired her from a 1982 performance of Stravinsky's Oedipus Rex because of her support of the PLO. Lillian Hellman testified in court on Redgrave's behalf. Redgrave won on a count of breach of contract, but did not win on the claim that the Boston orchestra had violated her civil rights by firing her.

In 1995, Redgrave was elected to serve as a UNICEF Goodwill Ambassador.

In December 2002, Redgrave paid £50,000 bail for Chechen separatist Deputy Premier and special envoy Akhmed Zakayev, who had sought political asylum in the United Kingdom. Zakayev was accused by Russia of hostage-taking and murder during the 1994–1996 Chechen war. At a press conference, Redgrave said she feared for Zakayev's safety if he were extradited to Russia on terrorism charges. He would "die of a heart attack" or some other mysterious explanation offered by Russia, she said. On 13 November 2003, a London court rejected the Russian government's request for Zakayev's extradition. Instead, the court accepted a plea by lawyers for Zakayev that he would not get a fair trial, and could even face torture, in Russia. "It would be unjust and oppressive to return Mr Zakayev to Russia", Judge Timothy Workman ruled. Due to her support of Zakayev and Chechen independence, she was awarded the Order of Friendship by the Chechen government in exile in 2024.

In 2004, Vanessa Redgrave and her brother Corin Redgrave launched the Peace and Progress Party, which campaigned against the Iraq War and for human rights. Redgrave left the party in 2005.

Redgrave has been an outspoken critic of the "war on terrorism". During a June 2005 interview on Larry King Live, Redgrave was challenged on this criticism and on her political views. In response she questioned whether there can be true democracy if the political leadership of the United States and Britain does not "uphold the values for which my father's generation fought the Nazis, [and] millions of people gave their lives against the Soviet Union's regime. [Such sacrifice was made] because of democracy and what democracy meant: no torture, no camps, no detention forever or without trial.... [Such] techniques are not just alleged [against the governments of the U.S. and Britain], they have actually been written about by the FBI. I don't think it's being 'far left'...to uphold the rule of law."

In March 2006, Redgrave remarked in an interview with US broadcast journalist Amy Goodman: "I don't know of a single government that actually abides by international human rights law, not one, including my own. In fact, [they] violate these laws in the most despicable and obscene way, I would say." Goodman's interview with Redgrave took place in the actress's West London home on the evening of 7 March, and covered a range of subjects, particularly the cancellation by the New York Theatre Workshop of the Alan Rickman production My Name is Rachel Corrie. Such a development, said Redgrave, was an "act of catastrophic cowardice" as "the essence of life and the essence of theatre is to communicate about lives, either lives that have ended or lives that are still alive, [and about] beliefs, and what is in those beliefs."

In June 2006, she was awarded a lifetime achievement award from the Transilvania International Film Festival, one of whose sponsors is a mining company named Gabriel Resources. She dedicated the award to a community organisation from Roşia Montană, Romania, which is campaigning against a gold mine that Gabriel Resources was seeking to build near the village. Gabriel Resources placed an "open letter" in The Guardian on 23 June 2006, attacking Redgrave, arguing the case for the mine. The open letter was signed by 77 villagers.

In December 2007, Redgrave was named as one of the possible suretors who paid the £50,000 bail for Jamil al-Banna, one of three British residents arrested after landing back in the UK following four years' captivity at Guantanamo Bay. Redgrave has declined to be specific about her financial involvement but said she was "very happy" to be of "some small assistance for Jamil and his wife", adding, "It is a profound honour and I am glad to be alive to be able to do this. Guantanamo Bay is a concentration camp."

In 2009, Redgrave, together with artist Julian Schnabel and playwright Martin Sherman, opposed the cultural boycott of Israel at the Toronto Film Festival, whilst maintaining her critical stance of the Israeli government's occupation of Palestinian territory.

In March 2014, Redgrave took part in a protest outside Pentonville Prison in north London after new prison regulations were introduced which forbade sending books to prisoners. She and fellow actor Samuel West, playwright David Hare and Poet Laureate Carol Ann Duffy took turns reading poetry and making speeches. Redgrave stated that the ban was "vicious and deplorable...Literature is something that stirs us beyond our immediate problems, it can help us to learn better our own problems, our own faults or to have a goal to live for, an aspiration." The ban was overturned by the Ministry of Justice the following December.

In 2017, Redgrave made her directorial debut with the movie Sea Sorrow, a documentary about the European migrant crisis and the plight of migrants encamped outside Calais, France, trying to reach Britain. She has heavily criticised the exclusionary policy of the British government towards refugees, stating that the British Government "... has violated these principles (of the Declaration of Human Rights), and it continues to do so, which I find deeply shameful. The UN signed the Declaration of Human Rights, and now we have to employ lawyers to take the government to court to force them to obey the law. Just thinking about that makes my mind go berserk."

== Acting credits and accolades ==
Redgrave has received an Academy Award, a BAFTA Award, two Emmy Awards, an Olivier Award, two Golden Globe Awards, a Screen Actors Guild Award, and a Tony Award.

Redgrave has been recognised by the Academy of Motion Picture Arts and Sciences for the following performances:

- 39th Academy Awards: Best Actress, nomination, Morgan – A Suitable Case for Treatment (1966)
- 41st Academy Awards: Best Actress, nomination, Isadora (1968)
- 44th Academy Awards: Best Actress, nomination, Mary, Queen of Scots (1971)
- 50th Academy Awards: Best Supporting Actress, win, Julia (1977)
- 57th Academy Awards: Best Actress, nomination, The Bostonians (1984)
- 65th Academy Awards: Best Supporting Actress, nomination, Howards End (1992)

Redgrave was appointed Commander of the Order of the British Empire (CBE) in 1967. Reportedly, she declined a damehood in 1999. However, she was appointed Dame Commander of the Order of the British Empire (DBE) in the 2022 New Year Honours for services to drama.

== See also ==
- List of Academy Award winners and nominees from Great Britain
- List of actors in Royal Shakespeare Company productions
- List of actors with Academy Award nominations
- List of actors with more than one Academy Award nomination in the acting categories
- List of British actors
- List of Golden Globe winners
- List of Primetime Emmy Award winners
- List of Royal National Theatre Company actors

== Sources ==
- Redgrave, Vanessa (1991). Vanessa Redgrave: An Autobiography. New York: Random House. ISBN 978-0-679-40216-9.
