= Behind the Mask (1958 film) =

British drama by Brian Desmond Hurst

- Promotional poster
- Directed by: Brian Desmond Hurst
- Written by: John Hunter; John Rowan Wilson
- Produced by: Sergei Nolbandov; Josef Somlo
- Starring: Michael Redgrave; Tony Britton; Carl Möhner; Niall MacGinnis; Vanessa Redgrave
- Cinematography: Robert Krasker
- Edited by: Allan Morrison
- Music by: Geoffrey Wright
- Production company: GW Films
- Distributed by: British Lion Films
- Release date: 24 October 1958 (London)
- Running time: 99 minutes
- Country: United Kingdom
- Language: English
- Budget: £164,162

Behind the Mask (also known as The Pack) is a 1958 British drama film directed by Brian Desmond Hurst and starring Michael Redgrave, Tony Britton, Ian Bannen and Lionel Jeffries. It was written by John Hunter and based on the 1955 novel The Pack by John Rowan Wilson. The film portrays the life of a surgeon in a busy hospital.

Redgrave's daughter, Vanessa Redgrave, made her film debut in this movie.

== Plot ==
Sir Arthur Benson Gray is senior surgeon at Graftondale Hospital. He appoints newly-qualified Philip Selwood, who is in love with Sir Arthur's daughter, as Registrar. Selwood befriends anaesthetist Carl Romek, who is secretly a drug-addict. One night when Selwood is with Romek, one of Selwood's patients dies. Selwood takes full responsibility and resigns. Sir Arthur, gravely ill, persuades him to accept the hospital's offer of reinstatement, which he does, vowing to uphold the standards set by Sir Arthur.

== Cast ==
- Michael Redgrave as Sir Arthur Benson Gray
- Tony Britton as Philip Selwood
- Carl Möhner as Dr Carl Romek
- Niall MacGinnis as Neil Isherwood
- Vanessa Redgrave as Pamela Benson Gray
- Ian Bannen as Alan Crabtree
- Brenda Bruce as Elizabeth Fallon
- Lionel Jeffries as Walter Froy
- Miles Malleson as Sir Oswald Pettiford
- John Welsh as Col. Langley
- Ann Firbank as Mrs Judson
- Jack Hedley as Dr Galbraith
- Hugh Miller as Examiner
- Mary Skinner as Theatre Sister
- Margaret Tyzack as Night Sister
- Joan Hickson as Nurse at clinic
- William Roache as Young Doctor (uncredited)

== Critical reception ==
The Monthly Film Bulletin wrote: "The first thirty minutes ... outline the character of the hospital staff and the three doctors with economy and force. But after that the script gives way to synthetic personal issues ... while the implications of the plot lack any moral clarity or logic. Sir Arthur, standing for tradition and intended to engage our sympathy, is shown as reactionary and incompetent; the ambitious Isherwood, of whose unprincipled determination to win we are clearly meant to disapprove, is depicted as anxious to develop research and a good surgeon. By refusing to face honestly the moral issues raised, this earnest and sincere tribute to hospital surgeons fails to make its point, much less to explore the deeper questions of power corruption at which it hints."

Picture Show wrote: "Brilliantly acted film which provides an engrossing peep behind the scenes of a provincial hospital. ... The highlight of the film is an authentic heart operation, with close-ups, which fascinate but won't be everyone's idea of entertainment."

The Radio Times Guide to Films gave the film 2/5 stars, writing: "Much of this potboiling drama about feuding surgeons, put-upon housemen and devoted nurses is taken up with a dispute between Michael Redgrave and Niall MacGinnis over the management of their hospital. Director Brian Desmond Hurst seems unable to choose between realism and melodrama, leaving his actors unsure how to pitch their performances."

British film critic Leslie Halliwell said: "Oddly titled social drama with interesting details but not much tension or conclusion."
