= Second Serve =

1986 television film directed by Anthony Page

- Vanessa Redgrave as Renée Richards
- Genre: Biography; Drama; Sport
- Written by: Stephanie Liss; Gavin Lambert
- Directed by: Anthony Page
- Starring: Vanessa Redgrave; Martin Balsam; Richard Venture; Louise Fletcher
- Music by: Brad Fiedel
- Country of origin: United States
- Original language: English

Production
- Executive producer: Linda Yellen
- Cinematography: Robbie Greenberg
- Editor: John C. Horger
- Running time: 120 minutes
- Production company: Lorimar-Telepictures

Original release
- Network: CBS
- Release: May 13, 1986

Second Serve is a 1986 American made-for-television biographical film starring Vanessa Redgrave as retired eye surgeon, professional tennis player, and transgender woman Renée Richards. The film is based on her 1983 autobiography Second Serve: The Renée Richards Story that was written with John Ames. The script is by Stephanie Liss and Gavin Lambert and the film was directed by Anthony Page. Second Serve aired on CBS on May 13, 1986.

== Plot ==
In 1976, Renée Richards is on the tennis court as a professional tennis player. The film flashes back to 1964, when Renée Richards is an eye surgeon named Richard Radley (both roles played by Redgrave). Radley has a successful career and a fiancée, but secretly cross-dresses at night. Unable to speak with his mother Sadie (Louise Fletcher), who is a psychiatrist, Radley consults his own psychiatrist, Dr. Beck (Martin Balsam), who advises him to grow a beard. This strategy works temporarily until Radley is drafted into the Navy, which does not allow beards. Following his discharge and a failed marriage, Radley undergoes gender reassignment surgery and becomes Renée.

Renée relocates to California, resumes her career as a surgeon and begins dating. After playing in a local tennis tournament in La Jolla, Renée is outed as transgender by a television reporter. In the ensuing controversy, Renée takes the United States Tennis Association to court, where she secures her right to play professional tournament tennis as a woman without being subjected to chromosome testing.

== Cast ==
- Vanessa Redgrave as Richard Radley/Renée Richards
  - Whit Hertford as Young Richard Radley
- Martin Balsam as Dr. Beck
- William Russ as Josh
- Alice Krige as Gwen
- Kerrie Keane as Meriam
- Richard Venture as Dr. David Radley
- Reni Santoni as Dr. Roberto Granato
- Louise Fletcher as Dr. Sadie M. Bishop
- Jeff Corey as Dr. Harry Benjamin
- Camila Ashland as Mrs. Brady

== Critical reception ==
Critic John J. O'Connor of The New York Times praised Redgrave's performance. Although noting that from a physical standpoint Redgrave is not very believable, O'Connor calls her performance "astonishingly convincing". While finding the script wanting for its tendency to reduce complexities to cliches, O'Connor also found that Second Serve "does manage, despite oversimplifications and evasions, to stick to the point. But it is the extraordinary Redgrave performance that slams the message home."

New York magazine concurred in this assessment, with reviewer John Leonard calling the film "calm and matter-of-fact, and perhaps too tidy". Leonard lavished Redgrave with praise for her performance, writing:

Redgrave, tall and vulnerable, athletic and bewildered, fearful and loving competitive and lonely, manages to transsex both ways. She embodies, with the fine bones of that face and the twitching of her various limbs, every internal contradiction of the polymorphously perverse."

Second Serve was not universally praised by critics, receiving negative reviews from such outlets as the Chicago Sun-Times.

Redgrave was nominated for an Emmy Award and a Golden Globe for her performance and Second Serve won Emmys for hairstyling and makeup.
