= Isadora (film) =

1968 biographical film by Karel Reisz

- Film poster by Reynold Brown
- Directed by: Karel Reisz
- Written by: Melvyn Bragg; Clive Exton; Margaret Drabble
- Based on: My Life (book) by Isadora Duncan; Isadora Duncan: An Intimate Portrait (book) by Sewell Stokes
- Produced by: Raymond Hakim; Robert Hakim
- Starring: Vanessa Redgrave; James Fox; Ivan Tchenko; Jason Robards
- Cinematography: Larry Pizer
- Edited by: Tom Priestley
- Music by: Anthony Bowles (dance music); Maurice Jarre
- Distributed by: Rank Film Distributors; Universal Pictures (U.S.)
- Release date: 18 December 1968
- Running time: Original version 177 min Director's cut 153 min Edited versions, 1969; 140 min (UK); 131 min (U.S.)
- Countries: United Kingdom; France
- Language: English
- Budget: $1.7 million or £1,484,021
- Box office: $1.25 million (U.S./Canada rentals)

Isadora (also known as The Loves of Isadora) is a 1968 biographical drama film directed by Karel Reisz from a screenplay written by Melvyn Bragg, Margaret Drabble, and Clive Exton adapted from the books My Life by Isadora Duncan and Isadora, an Intimate Portrait by Sewell Stokes. The film follows the life of American pioneering modern contemporary dance artist and choreographer Isadora Duncan, who performed to great acclaim throughout the U.S. and Europe during the 19th century. A co-production between the United Kingdom and France, it stars Vanessa Redgrave as Duncan and also features James Fox, Jason Robards, and John Fraser in supporting roles.

Isadora was in the main competition at the 1969 Cannes Film Festival where Redgrave won the Best Actress Prize. The film's initial limited theatrical release on 18 December 1968 by Universal Pictures in Los Angeles was for the Academy Award qualification. Its general release in Spring 1969 received generally positive reviews with major acclaim for Redgrave's performance. However the film underperformed at the box office grossing mere $1.25 million on a $1.7 million budget. For her performance, Redgrave won the National Society of Film Critics Award for Best Actress, and received nominations for the Academy Award for Best Actress and the Golden Globe Award for Best Actress in a Motion Picture – Drama.

== Plot ==
In 1927, Isadora Duncan has become a legend as the innovator of modern dance, a temperamental bohemian, and an outspoken advocate of free love. Now past 40, she lives in poverty in a small hotel on the French Riviera with her companion Mary Estelle Dempsey/Mary Desti (named only as Mary in the film) and her secretary Roger, to whom she is dictating her memoirs. As a young girl in California, Isadora first demonstrates her disdain for accepted social standards by burning her parents' marriage certificate and pledging her dedication to the pursuit of art and beauty. In 1896, she performs under the name of Peppy Dora in a rowdy music hall in Chicago and publicly embarrasses the theatre manager into paying her $300 so that she can take her family to England. Modelling her free-form style of dance and costume after Greek classicism, she rapidly acquires international acclaim.

In Berlin, she meets her first love, Gordon Craig, a young stage designer who promises her that together they will create a new world of theatre. After bearing the already-married Craig a daughter, Isadora moves to Paris and meets Paris Singer, a millionaire who lavishes gifts upon her and later buys her an enormous estate for her to open a School for Life, where only beauty and simplicity are taught.

Following the birth of a son, Isadora returns to England with Singer but becomes bored with her quiet life and enters into an affair with her pianist, Armand. A short time later, both of her children are drowned when their chauffeur-driven car plunges off a bridge into the Seine. Broken by the tragedy, Isadora leaves Singer and wanders about Europe until in 1921 she receives an offer to open a dancing school in the Soviet Union.

Unaffected by the country's poverty, she develops a strong rapport with the peasantry and has a passionate affair with Sergei Essenin, a volatile poet whom she marries so that he can obtain a visa to accompany her to the United States. Essenin's outrageous behaviour turns a press conference into a shambles, however, and U.S. anti-Bolshevist sentiment turns to open hostility when Isadora bares her breasts during a dance recital in Boston. Following the disintegration of her marriage, she returns to Nice to write her memoirs. Impulsively selling her possessions to open a new school in Paris, Isadora goes to a local café to celebrate and spots Bugatti, a handsome Italian whom she has been admiring for several days. She goes for a drive with him in his sports car, and as they roar along a road by the sea, Isadora's long chiffon scarf catches in the spokes of a wheel and strangles her.

== Cast ==
- Vanessa Redgrave as Isadora Duncan
- John Fraser as Roger
- James Fox as Gordon Craig
- Jason Robards as Paris Singer
- Zvonimir Crnko (billed as Ivan Tchenko) as Sergey Esenin
- Vladimir Leskovar as Bugatti
- Cynthia Harris as Mary Desti
- Bessie Love as Mrs. Duncan
- Tony Vogel as Raymond Duncan
- Libby Glenn as Elizabeth Duncan
- Ronnie Gilbert as Miss Chase
- Wallas Eaton as Archer
- Nicholas Pennell as Bedford
- John Quentin as Pim
- Christian Duvaleix as Armand

== Releases ==
The original 177-minute version premiered at Loew's Hollywood in Los Angeles on 18 December 1968. While praising Redgrave's performance, critics took issue with the film's length and pacing and 20 minutes were soon cut. Despite the reduced running time, the film still performed disappointingly and the film closed at Loew's Hollywood on 6 February 1969.

The 140-minute cut opened in Europe in spring 1969, while the 131-minute Northern American version, retitled The Loves of Isadora, premiered in April of that year.

NBC-TV broadcast a partially restored version of the original cut on 30 June – 1 July 1972, running 168 minutes. It was repeated in April 1973, then made available for syndication.

Reisz' director's cut debuted on California cable station Z Channel in 1986, then was released on VHS in July 1988 by MCA Home Video.

== Reception ==
On Rotten Tomatoes, the film has an aggregate score of 80% based on 8 positive and 2 negative critic reviews.

== Soundtrack ==
Kapp Records issued a soundtrack stereo LP, The Loves of Isadora, in October 1969 (catalogue number KRS-5511). It includes Jarre's theme music, Anthony Bowles' incidental music, orchestral music by Bach, Beethoven, Bizet, Borodin and Tchaikovsky used on the soundtrack, and the song "Bye Bye Blackbird", with an unnamed orchestra conducted by Jarre. The cover of the North American pressings of the soundtrack feature a photo of Redgrave by Victor Skrebneski, taken during the production of the movie Camelot.
