= Doheny Plaza =

- Interactive map of the Doheny Plaza area

General information
- Type: Residential
- Location: 818 North Doheny Drive, West Hollywood, California
- Coordinates: 34.08538°N 118.38924°W
- Completed: 1963

Technical details
- Floor count: 13

Design and construction
- Developer: Julian Weinstock

The Doheny Plaza is a high-rise residential building in West Hollywood, California. It was designed in the modernist architectural style. When it was built by Julian Weinstock in 1963, it was the first high-rise residential building in Los Angeles. By 1966, Weinstock gave a speech about it at the Biltmore Hotel.
