= Morgan – A Suitable Case for Treatment =

1966 British film by Karel Reisz

- UK theatrical release poster
- Directed by: Karel Reisz
- Written by: David Mercer
- Produced by: Leon Clore
- Starring: David Warner; Vanessa Redgrave; Robert Stephens; Irene Handl; Bernard Bresslaw; Arthur Mullard
- Cinematography: Larry Pizer
- Edited by: Tom Priestley; Jack Harris
- Music by: John Dankworth
- Distributed by: British Lion Films
- Release date: 4 April 1966
- Running time: 97 minutes
- Country: United Kingdom
- Language: English
- Budget: £201,824 or £191,674

Morgan – A Suitable Case for Treatment (also known as Morgan) is a 1966 British comedy film directed by Karel Reisz and starring David Warner, Vanessa Redgrave, and Robert Stephens, with Irene Handl and Bernard Bresslaw. It was made by British Lion and produced by Leon Clore from a screenplay by David Mercer, adapted from his BBC television play A Suitable Case for Treatment (1962), in which the leading role was played by Ian Hendry. Director Stephen Frears worked as an assistant director to Reisz on this film.

== Plot ==
Morgan Delt is a failed working-class London artist, who was raised as a communist by his parents. His upper-class wife, Leonie, has given up on him and is in the process of getting a divorce in order to marry Charles Napier, an art gallery owner of her own social standing. Locked into a personal world of fantasy, Morgan performs a series of bizarre stunts in a campaign to win back Leonie, including putting a skeleton in her bed and blowing up the bed as her mother sits on it. When these stunts fail, Morgan secures the help of Wally "The Gorilla", a pro wrestler friend of his mother, to kidnap Leonie, who still nurtures residual feelings of love tinged with pity for Morgan. Leonie is left with Morgan and Wally in the British countryside (clips from Tarzan (1943) are cut into the film). Leonie soon gets rescued, and Morgan is arrested and imprisoned.

After escaping, he dresses as a gorilla and crashes the wedding reception of Leonie and Charles. (Clips from King Kong (1933) are used to illustrate Morgan's fantasy world). Morgan flees the wedding on a motorcycle, his gorilla suit on fire, and subsequently is committed to an insane asylum. Later a visibly pregnant Leonie visits him. With a wink, Leonie tells him he is the child's father. Morgan returns to tending a flowerbed, as the camera pulls out to a longshot of the entire circular flowerbed with the enclosed flowers arranged into a hammer and sickle.

== Cast ==
- David Warner as Morgan Delt
- Vanessa Redgrave as Leonie Delt
- Robert Stephens as Charles Napier
- Irene Handl as Mrs. Delt
- Bernard Bresslaw as policeman
- Arthur Mullard as Wally
- Newton Blick as Mr. Henderson
- Nan Munro as Mrs. Henderson
- Peter Collingwood as Geoffrey
- Graham Crowden as counsel
- John Garrie as Tipstaff
- John Rae as Judge
- Peter Cellier as second counsel

== Critical reception ==
The Monthly Film Bulletin wrote: "When Karel Reisz uses the frozen shots and jump cuts, one feels that he at least knows why he is using this technical device at this moment. What he doesn't do is pass on that awareness to the audience, by getting the film out of the test-tube and into life. When Morgan dreams of giraffes and antelopes, sees himself as Tarzan or King Kong, the fantasies look like affectations to go with the chic interior decoration rather than stages on the road to the asylum. Poor Morgan, one feels; victim of a satire that doesn't bite, lost in a technical confusion of means and ends, and emerging like an identikit photograph, all bits and pieces and no recognisable face."

Variety wrote: "Despite the apparently light-weight marquee value of topliners David Warner (currently London's ranking 'Hamlet') and Vanessa Redgrave (daughter of actor Michael Redgrave), they display such attractive film personalities and performing gifts that reviews and word-of-mouth should put them in the 'discovery' category, usually a plus for artie appeal. Special handling could find a wider audience for the way-out pic, especially among the college set."

The Radio Times Guide to Films gave the film 3/5 stars, writing: "Angry young men were abundant in the British cinema of the 1960s, but they were never so irate as working-class artist David Warner, who tries to sabotage the second marriage of his middle-class ex-wife Vanessa Redgrave to art dealer Robert Stephens by rewiring their house and dressing in a gorilla suit. Adapted from David Mercer's television play, it's really a fable about the class society. Yet its dream sequences and surreal touches make it more odd than meaningful, and it now feels dated".

Leslie Halliwell said: "Archetypal sixties marital fantasy, an extension of Look Back in Anger [1959] in the mood of swinging London. As tiresome as it is funny – but it is funny."

The film has a fresh 65% on Rotten Tomatoes from twenty critic reviews.

== Accolades ==
David Mercer won a BAFTA for Best British Screenplay for the film at the 20th British Academy Film Awards. The film was nominated for Academy Awards for Best Actress in a Leading Role (Vanessa Redgrave) and Best Costume Design, Black-and-White (Jocelyn Rickards). It was also nominated for the Palme d'Or (Golden Palm) at the 1966 Cannes Film Festival and Redgrave was awarded Best Actress.
