= Workers' International League (1987) =

- Abbreviation: WIL
- Leader: Richard Price
- Chairperson: Ian Harrison
- Founder: Sheila Torrance
- Founded: 1987
- Dissolved: 2006
- Split from: Workers' Revolutionary Party
- Newspaper: Workers News; Workers Action
- Ideology: Trotskyism
- Political position: Far-left
- International affiliation: Leninist-Trotskyist Tendency

The Workers' International League (WIL) was a British Trotskyist organisation that split in early 1987 from the Workers' Revolutionary Party (WRP) which had been led by Sheila Torrance.

The League soon started to publish Workers' News as its monthly publication. Initially, the group around leading WRP adherents Richard Price and Ian Harrison defended the Healyite tradition, albeit in a critical way. However, during and after a nine-month faction struggle against a minority section in the organisation who supported the idea of joining David North's ICFI, the group began to abandon the Healyite tradition and came to the conclusion that the Fourth International had degenerated by the late 1940s, needing to be rebuilt afresh.

Due to a physical altercation between a leading member of the WIL, then in Torrance's WRP, with a leading member of the Workers Press faction of the WRP during the 1986 printers' dispute in Wapping, east London, there was great hostility between the two groups, which did not help in its fledgling steps into the wider labour movement. Even so, two years after its formation, the WIL had recruited Bob Pitt, who was originally a supporter of the Workers Press faction of the WRP.

The League also began to have discussions with other small groups, particularly Workers Power and the Revolutionary Internationalist League, and though these discussions did not amount to a merger of these groups, they did help the organisation to mature politically.

In March 1991, the WIL fused with the Leninist-Trotskyist Tendency of Belgium and Germany and a group of South African Trotskyists to form the Leninist-Trotskyist Tendency (LTT).

After an acrimonious split in 1997, the majority of the WIL evolved into a group around the magazine Workers Action, which was produced quarterly until 2004 and bi-annually until its thirtieth and last edition in August 2006.
