= Electoral history of Margaret Thatcher =

Elections featuring UK Prime Minister

This is a summary of the electoral history of Margaret Thatcher, who served as Prime Minister of the United Kingdom from 1979 to 1990 and Leader of the Conservative Party from 1975 to 1990. She was the member of parliament (MP) for Finchley from 1959 to 1992.

== Parliamentary elections ==
=== 1950 general election, Dartford ===
General election 1950: Dartford
| Party | Candidate | Votes | % | ±% |
|---|---|---|---|---|
| Labour Co-op | Norman Dodds | 38,128 | 56.4 | −12.0 |
| Conservative | Margaret Roberts | 24,490 | 36.2 | +4.6 |
| Liberal | Anthony H. Giles | 5,011 | 7.4 | N/A |
| Majority | | 13,638 | 20.2 | −16.6 |
| Turnout | | 67,629 | 85.5 | +10.6 |
| Labour Co-op hold | | Swing | −8.3 | |

=== 1951 general election, Dartford ===
General election 1951: Dartford
| Party | Candidate | Votes | % | ±% |
|---|---|---|---|---|
| Labour Co-op | Norman Dodds | 40,094 | 59.1 | +2.7 |
| Conservative | Margaret Roberts | 27,760 | 40.9 | +4.7 |
| Majority | | 12,334 | 18.2 | −2.0 |
| Turnout | | 67,854 | 85.2 | −0.3 |
| Labour Co-op hold | | Swing | −1.0 | |

=== 1959 general election, Finchley ===
General election 1959: Finchley
| Party | Candidate | Votes | % | ±% |
|---|---|---|---|---|
| Conservative | Margaret Thatcher | 29,697 | 53.2 | −1.3 |
| Labour | Eric Deakins | 13,437 | 24.1 | −7.3 |
| Liberal | Henry Ivan Spence | 12,701 | 22.7 | +8.7 |
| Majority | | 16,260 | 29.1 | +6.0 |
| Turnout | | 55,835 | 80.8 | +2.5 |
| Conservative hold | | Swing | +3.0 | |

=== 1964 general election, Finchley ===
General election 1964: Finchley
| Party | Candidate | Votes | % | ±% |
|---|---|---|---|---|
| Conservative | Margaret Thatcher | 24,591 | 46.6 | −6.6 |
| Liberal | John Pardoe | 15,789 | 29.9 | +7.2 |
| Labour | Albert Edward Tomlinson | 12,408 | 23.5 | −0.6 |
| Majority | | 8,802 | 16.7 | −12.4 |
| Turnout | | 52,788 | 78.2 | −2.6 |
| Conservative hold | | Swing | | |

=== 1966 general election, Finchley ===
General election 1966: Finchley
| Party | Candidate | Votes | % | ±% |
|---|---|---|---|---|
| Conservative | Margaret Thatcher | 23,968 | 46.5 | −0.1 |
| Labour | Yvonne Sieve | 14,504 | 28.1 | +4.6 |
| Liberal | Frank Davis | 13,070 | 25.4 | −4.5 |
| Majority | | 9,464 | 18.4 | +1.7 |
| Turnout | | 51,542 | 75.3 | −2.9 |
| Conservative hold | | Swing | −2.4 | |

=== 1970 general election, Finchley ===
General election 1970: Finchley
| Party | Candidate | Votes | % | ±% |
|---|---|---|---|---|
| Conservative | Margaret Thatcher | 25,480 | 53.8 | +7.3 |
| Labour | Michael Freeman | 14,295 | 30.2 | +2.1 |
| Liberal | Graham Mitchell | 7,614 | 16.1 | −9.3 |
| Majority | | 11,185 | 23.6 | +5.2 |
| Turnout | | 47,389 | 65.6 | −9.7 |
| Conservative hold | | Swing | +2.6 | |

=== February 1974 general election, Finchley ===
General election February 1974: Finchley
| Party | Candidate | Votes | % | ±% |
|---|---|---|---|---|
| Conservative | Margaret Thatcher | 18,180 | 43.7 | −8.6 |
| Labour | Martin O'Connor | 12,202 | 29.3 | −2.3 |
| Liberal | Laurence Brass | 11,221 | 27.0 | +10.9 |
| Majority | | 5,978 | 14.4 | |
| Turnout | | 41,603 | 78.0 | |
| Conservative hold | | Swing | −3.1 | |

=== October 1974 general election, Finchley ===
General election October 1974: Finchley
| Party | Candidate | Votes | % | ±% |
|---|---|---|---|---|
| Conservative | Margaret Thatcher | 16,498 | 44.0 | +0.3 |
| Labour | Martin O'Connor | 12,587 | 33.6 | +4.3 |
| Liberal | Laurence Brass | 7,384 | 19.7 | −7.3 |
| National Front | Janet Godfrey | 993 | 2.7 | New |
| Majority | | 3,911 | 10.4 | −4.0 |
| Turnout | | 37,462 | 69.5 | −8.5 |
| Conservative hold | | Swing | −2.0 | |

=== 1979 general election, Finchley ===
General election 1979: Finchley
| Party | Candidate | Votes | % | ±% |
|---|---|---|---|---|
| Conservative | Margaret Thatcher | 20,918 | 52.5 | +8.5 |
| Labour | Richard May | 13,040 | 32.7 | −0.9 |
| Liberal | Anthony Paterson | 5,254 | 13.2 | −6.5 |
| National Front | William Verity | 534 | 1.3 | −1.4 |
| Independent Democrat | Elizabeth Lloyd | 86 | 0.2 | New |
| Majority | | 7,878 | 19.8 | +9.4 |
| Turnout | | 39,832 | 72.5 | +3.0 |
| Conservative hold | | Swing | +4.7 | |

=== 1983 general election, Finchley ===
General election 1983: Finchley
| Party | Candidate | Votes | % | ±% |
|---|---|---|---|---|
| Conservative | Margaret Thatcher | 19,616 | 51.1 | −1.4 |
| Labour | Laurence Spigel | 10,302 | 26.8 | −5.9 |
| Liberal | Margaret Joachim | 7,763 | 20.2 | +7.0 |
| Ecology | Simone Wilkinson | 279 | 0.7 | New |
| Monster Raving Loony | Screaming Lord Sutch | 235 | 0.6 | New |
| Ban Every Licensing Law Society | Anthony Noonan | 75 | 0.2 | New |
| Rail Not Motorway | Helen Anscomb | 42 | 0.1 | New |
| Law and Order in Gotham City | Anthony Whitehead | 37 | 0.1 | New |
| Anti-Censorship | David Webb | 28 | 0.1 | New |
| Party of Associates with Licensees | Brian Wareham | 27 | 0.1 | New |
| Belgrano Blood-Hunger | Benjamin Wedmore | 13 | 0.0 | New |
| Majority | | 9,314 | 24.3 | +4.5 |
| Turnout | | 38,417 | 69.0 | −3.5 |
| Conservative hold | | Swing | +2.2 | |

=== 1987 general election, Finchley ===
General election 1987: Finchley
| Party | Candidate | Votes | % | ±% |
|---|---|---|---|---|
| Conservative | Margaret Thatcher | 21,603 | 53.9 | +2.8 |
| Labour | John Davies | 12,690 | 31.7 | +4.9 |
| Liberal | David Howarth | 5,580 | 13.9 | −7.3 |
| Gremloid Party | Lord Buckethead | 131 | 0.3 | New |
| Gold Party | Michaelle St Vincent | 59 | 0.2 | New |
| Majority | | 8,913 | 22.2 | −2.1 |
| Turnout | | 40,063 | 69.4 | +0.4 |
| Conservative hold | | Swing | −1.0 | |

== Conservative Party leadership elections ==
=== 1975 leadership election ===
First ballot: 4 February 1975
| Candidate | Votes | % |
|---|---|---|
| Margaret Thatcher | 130 | 47.1 |
| Edward Heath | 119 | 43.1 |
| Hugh Fraser | 16 | 5.8 |
| Abstention | 11 | 4.0 |
Second ballot required

Second ballot: 11 February 1975
| Candidate | Votes | % |
|---|---|---|
| Margaret Thatcher | 146 | 52.9 |
| William Whitelaw | 79 | 28.6 |
| Geoffrey Howe | 19 | 6.9 |
| Jim Prior | 19 | 6.9 |
| John Peyton | 11 | 4 |
Margaret Thatcher elected

=== 1989 leadership election ===
Only ballot: 5 December 1989
| Candidate | Votes | % |
|---|---|---|
| Margaret Thatcher | 314 | 84.0 |
| Sir Anthony Meyer | 33 | 8.8 |
| Abstentions | 3 | 0.8 |
| Spoilt | 24 | 6.4 |
| Majority | 281 | 75.1 |
| Turnout | 374 | N/A |
Margaret Thatcher re-elected

=== 1990 leadership election ===
First ballot: 20 November 1990
| Candidate | Votes | % |
|---|---|---|
| Margaret Thatcher | 204 | 54.8 |
| Michael Heseltine | 152 | 40.9 |
| Abstentions | 16 | 4.3 |
| Majority | 52 | 14.0 |
| Turnout | 372 | 100 |
Second ballot required

== United Kingdom general elections ==
=== 1979 general election ===

Results of the May 1979 general election to the House of Commons of the United Kingdom
| Party | Leader | Candidates | MPs | | | | | Aggregate votes | | |
| Party | Leader | Candidates | Total | Gains | Losses | Net | Of total (%) | Total | Of total (%) | Change (%) |
|---|---|---|---|---|---|---|---|---|---|---|
| Conservative | Margaret; Thatcher | 622 | 339 | 63 | 1 (Note: Teddy Taylor in Glasgow Cathcart.) | ▲62 | 53.4 | 13,697,923 | 43.9 | ▲8.1 |
| Labour | James; Callaghan | 623 (Note: Includes 25 Co-operative Party candidates, as part of the Labour-Co-op alliance.) | 269 (Note: Includes 17 Co-operative Party MPs, as part of the Labour-Co-op alliance.) | 4 | 54 | ▼50 (Note: Includes ▲3 Co-operative Party MPs, as part of the Labour-Co-op alliance.) | 42.4 (Note: Includes 2.7% for the Co-operative Party, as part of the Labour-Co-op alliance.) | 11,457,079 (Note: Includes 485,115 for the Co-operative Party, as part of the Labour-Co-op alliance.) | 36.9 (Note: Includes 1.6% for the Co-operative Party, as part of the Labour-Co-op alliance.) | ▼2.3 (Note: Includes 0.0% for the Co-operative Party, as part of the Labour-Co-op alliance.) |
| Liberal | David; Steel | 577 | 11 | 1 (Note: David Alton in Liverpool Edge Hill.) | 3 | ▼2 | 2.1 | 5,346,704 | 18.3 | ▼1.0 |
| SNP | William; Wolfe | 71 | 2 | 0 | 9 | ▼9 | 0.3 | 504,259 | 1.6 | ▼1.3 |
| UUP | Harry; West | 11 | 5 | 1 (Note: Robert Bradford in Belfast South.) | 2 | ▼1 | 0.8 | 254,578 | 0.8 | ▼0.1 |
| National; Front | John; Tyndall | 303 | 0 | 0 | 0 | Steady | — | 191,719 | 0.6 | ▲0.2 |
| Plaid Cymru | Gwynfor; Evans | 36 | 2 | 0 | 1 (Note: Leader Gwynfor Evans in Carmarthen.) | ▼1 | 0.3 | 132,544 | 0.4 | ▼0.2 |
| SDLP | Gerry; Fitt | 9 | 1 (Note: Gerry Fitt in Belfast West.) | 0 | 0 | Steady | 0.2 | 126,325 | 0.4 | ▼0.1 |
| Alliance | Oliver; Napier | 12 | 0 | 0 | 0 | Steady | — | 82,892 | 0.3 | ▲0.1 |
| DUP | Ian; Paisley | 5 | 3 | 2 | 0 | ▲2 | 0.5 | 70,975 | 0.2 | Steady |
| Ecology | Jonathan; Tyler | 53 | 0 | 0 | 0 | Steady | — | 39,918 | 0.1 | ▲0.1 |
| UUUP | Ernest; Baird | 2 | 1 (Note: John Dunlop in Mid Ulster.) | New | | ▲1 | 0.2 | 39,856 | 0.1 | New |
| Independent; Unionist | —N/a | 1 | 1 (Note: James Kilfedder in North Down.) | 1 | 0 | ▲1 | 0.2 | 36,989 | 0.1 | ▲0.1 |
| Independent; Labour | —N/a | 7 | 0 | 0 | 0 | Steady | — | 23,884 | 0.1 | Steady |
| Irish Independence | Pat; Fahy | 4 | 0 | New | | | — | 23,086 | 0.1 | New |
| Independent; Republican | —N/a | 1 | 1 (Note: Frank Maguire in Fermanagh and South Tyrone.) | 0 | 0 | Steady | 0.2 | 22,398 | 0.1 | Steady |
| Communist | Gordon; McLennan | 38 | 0 | 0 | 0 | Steady | — | 16,858 | 0.1 | Steady |
| Scottish; Labour | Jim; Sillars | 3 | 0 | New | | | — | 13,737 | 0.0 | New |
| Workers; Revolutionary | Michael; Banda | 60 | 0 | 0 | 0 | Steady | — | 12,631 | 0.0 | Steady |
| Republican; Clubs | Tomás; Mac Giolla | 7 | 0 | 0 | 0 | Steady | — | 12,098 | 0.0 | ▼0.1 |
| Independent | —N/a | 33 | 0 | 0 | 0 | Steady | — | 11,627 | 0.0 | Steady |
| Independent; SDLP | —N/a | 1 (Note: Candidate Austin Currie stood in Fermanagh and South Tyrone.) | 0 | New | | | — | 10,795 | 0.0 | New |
| Unionist Party NI | Anne; Dickson | 3 | 0 | 0 | 0 | Steady | — | 8,021 | 0.0 | ▼0.1 |
| Independent; Conservative | —N/a | 8 | 0 | 0 | 0 | Steady | — | 5,621 | 0.0 | Steady |
| NI; Labour | Alan; Carr | 3 | 0 | 0 | 0 | Steady | — | 4,411 | 0.0 | Steady |
| Mebyon; Kernow | Richard; Jenkin | 3 | 0 | 0 | 0 | Steady | — | 4,164 | 0.0 | Steady |
| Democratic; Labour | Dick; Taverne | 2 | 0 | 0 | 0 | Steady | — | 3,785 | 0.0 | ▼0.1 |
| Wessex; Regionalists | Alexander; Thynn | 7 | 0 | Did not stand in Oct. 1974 | | | — | 3,090 | 0.0 | —N/a |
| Socialist; Unity | —N/a | 11 | 0 | New | | | — | 2,966 | 0.0 | New |
| United; Labour | Paddy; Devlin | 1 (Note: Candidate Bob Kidd stood in South Antrim.) | 0 | New | | | — | 1,895 | 0.0 | New |
| Ratepayer (Leek) | —N/a | 1 (Note: Candidate CI Bailey stood in Leek.) | 0 | New | | | — | 1,451 | 0.0 | New |
| United; Country | Edmund; Iremonger | 2 | 0 | New | | | — | 1,033 | 0.0 | New |
| Anti-Common; Market | —N/a | 3 | 0 | Did not stand in Oct. 1974 | | | — | 926 | 0.0 | —N/a |
| Independent; Liberal | —N/a | 1 (Note: Candidate H. I. Fjortoft stood in Bootle.) | 0 | 0 | 0 | Steady | — | 911 | 0.0 | Steady |
| Oxford; Ecological | —N/a | 1 (Note: Candidate Anthony Cheke stood in Oxford.) | 0 | New | | | — | 887 | 0.0 | New |
| Workers (Leninist) | Royston; Bull | 2 | 0 | New | | | — | 824 | 0.0 | New |
| New; Britain | Dennis; Delderfield | 3 | 0 | New | | | — | 843 | 0.0 | New |
| Silly; Party | —N/a | 1 (Note: Candidate Jeremy Fox stood in Dover and Deal.) | 0 | New | | | — | 642 | 0.0 | New |
| Troops Out of Ireland | —N/a | 1 (Note: Candidate B. Gallagher stood in Barnsley.) | 0 | New | | | — | 638 | 0.0 | New |
| Christian; Stop Abortion | —N/a | 1 (Note: Candidate F. C. J. Radcliffe stood in York.) | 0 | New | | | — | 569 | 0.0 | New |
| Labour; Alliance | —N/a | 1 (Note: Candidate Douglas Elliot stood in Vauxhall.) | 0 | New | | | — | 565 | 0.0 | New |
| Fellowship | Ronald; Mallone | 2 | 0 | Did not stand in Oct. 1974 | | | — | 531 | 0.0 | —N/a |
| More Prosperous Britain | Tom; Keen | 6 | 0 | 0 | 0 | Steady | — | 518 | 0.0 | Steady |
| Independent; Democrat | —N/a | 3 | 0 | New | | | — | 479 | 0.0 | New |
| Severnside; Libertarian | —N/a | 1 (Note: Candidate Raymond William Aldridge stood in Cardiff South East.) | 0 | New | | | — | 375 | 0.0 | New |
| Fancy; Dress | —N/a | 1 (Note: Candidate John Beddowes stood in Dartford.) | 0 | New | | | — | 328 | 0.0 | New |
| Christian; Democrat | —N/a | 1 (Note: Candidate R. Darroch stood in Central Dunbartonshire.) | 0 | New | | | — | 312 | 0.0 | New |
| Irish; National | —N/a | 1 (Note: Candidate James O'Leary stood in Acton.) | 0 | New | | | — | 243 | 0.0 | New |
| United; English National | —N/a | 2 | 0 | 0 | 0 | Steady | — | 238 | 0.0 | Steady |
| Independent; Rhodesian | —N/a | 1 (Note: Candiate Peter Scott stood in Guildford.) | 0 | New | | | — | 232 | 0.0 | New |
| Cornish; Nationalist | James; Whetter | 1 (Note: Leader James Whetter stood in Truro.) | 0 | New | | | — | 227 | 0.0 | New |
| Citizens; Protest Vote | —N/a | 1 (Note: Candidate S. L. Bradford stood in Farnham.) | 0 | New | | | — | 204 | 0.0 | New |
| Child and Family; Protection | —N/a | 1 (Note: Candidate Philip Crome stood in Birmingham Selly Oak.) | 0 | New | | | — | 190 | 0.0 | New |
| Public Safety | William; Boaks | 3 | 0 | 0 | 0 | Steady | — | 182 | 0.0 | Steady |
| British Socialist; Empire | —N/a | 1 (Note: Candidate S. Rowe stood in Newcastle-under-Lyme.) | 0 | New | | | — | 156 | 0.0 | New |
| Homeland; Party | —N/a | 1 (Note: Candidate Ian MacKillian stood in Orpington.) | 0 | New | | | — | 146 | 0.0 | New |
| Social; Democratic | Donald; Kean | 1 (Note: Candidate C. Campbell stood in Warrington.) | 0 | New | | | — | 144 | 0.0 | New |
| English; National | Frank; Hansford-Miller | 1 (Note: Leader Frank Hansford-Miller stood in North Devon.) | 0 | 0 | 0 | Steady | — | 142 | 0.0 | Steady |
| Independent; Businessman | —N/a | 1 (Note: Candidate Sohan Paul stood in Southall.) | 0 | New | | | — | 115 | 0.0 | New |
| Fine Gael (Scotland) | —N/a | 1 (Note: Candidate Uilleam Bell stood in Inverness.) | 0 | 0 | 0 | Steady | — | 112 | 0.0 | Steady |
| Anti- Corruption | —N/a | 1 (Note: Candidate Ernest Leonard Tibbitts stood in Leeds North East.) | 0 | New | | | — | 103 | 0.0 | New |
| Providers Through; Care | —N/a | 1 (Note: Candidate Alf Hollander stood in Streatham.) | 0 | New | | | — | 102 | 0.0 | New |
| Dog Lover's Party | Auberon; Waugh | 1 (Note: Leader Auberon Waugh stood in North Devon.) | 0 | New | | | — | 79 | 0.0 | New |
| Socialist (GB) | —N/a | 1 (Note: Candidate Ralph Critchfield stood in Islington South and Finsbury.) | 0 | 0 | 0 | Steady | — | 78 | 0.0 | Steady |
| Revolutionary; Reform | —N/a | 1 (Note: Candidate T. Kyle stood in Lincoln.) | 0 | New | | | — | 77 | 0.0 | New |
| Police State; Prevention | —N/a | 1 (Note: Candidate Jitendra Bardwaj stood in Luton East.) | 0 | New | | | — | 61 | 0.0 | New |
| Libertarian; Party | —N/a | 1 (Note: Candidate David Dean Wedgwood stood in Richmond upon Thames.) | 0 | New | | | — | 34 | 0.0 | New |
| Community; Party | —N/a | 1 (Note: Leader J. Harwell stood in Battersea North.) | 0 | New | | | — | 30 | 0.0 | New |
| Other non-contested | | 0 | 0 | —N/a | | ▼3 (Note: 3 Vanguard Unionist Progressive Party seats, with the party disbanding in 1978.) | — | 0 | 0.0 | —N/a |
| Blank and invalid votes | | | | | | | | 117,848 | — | — |
| Total | | 2,576 | 635 | | | 0 | 100.0 | 31,221,362 (Note: All valid votes excluding spoiled votes.) | 100.0 | 0.0 |
| Registered voters, and turnout | | | | | | | | 41,093,264 | 76.0 | ▲3.2 |

=== 1983 general election ===

Results of the June 1983 general election to the House of Commons of the United Kingdom
| Party | Leader | Candidates | MPs | | | | | Aggregate votes | | |
| Party | Leader | Candidates | Total | Gains | Losses | Net | Of total (%) | Total | Of total (%) | Change (%) |
|---|---|---|---|---|---|---|---|---|---|---|
| Conservative | Margaret; Thatcher | 633 | 397 | 48 | 10 | ▲38 | 61.1 | 13,012,316 | 42.4 | ▼1.5 |
| Labour | Michael; Foot | 633 (Note: Includes 17 Co-operative Party candidates, as part of the Labour-Co-op alliance.) | 209 (Note: Includes 7 Co-operative Party MPs, as part of the Labour-Co-op alliance.) | 4 | 56 | ▼52 (Note: Includes ▼10 Co-operative Party MPs, as part of the Labour-Co-op alliance.) | 32.2 (Note: Includes 1.1% for the Co-operative Party, as part of the Labour-Co-op alliance.) | 8,456,934 (Note: Includes 299,080 for the Co-operative Party, as part of the Labour-Co-op alliance.) | 27.6 (Note: Includes 1.0% for the Co-operative Party, as part of the Labour-Co-op alliance.) | ▼9.3 (Note: Includes ▼0.6% for the Co-operative Party, as part of the Labour-Co-op alliance.) |
| SDP–Liberal; Alliance | —N/a | 633 | 23 | New | | ▲14 | 3.5 | 7,780,949 | 25.4 | New |
| Liberal | David; Steel | 322 | 17 | 8 | 0 | ▲8 | 2.6 | 4,210,115 | 13.7 | ▼0.1 |
| SDP | Roy; Jenkins | 311 | 6 | New | | ▲6 | 0.9 | 3,570,834 | 11.6 | New |
| SNP | Gordon; Wilson | 72 | 2 | 0 | 0 | Steady | 0.3 | 331,975 | 1.1 | ▼0.5 |
| UUP | James; Molyneaux | 16 | 11 | 3 | 1 | ▲2 | 1.7 | 259,952 | 0.8 | Steady |
| DUP | Ian; Paisley | 14 | 3 | 2 | 1 | ▲1 | 0.5 | 152,749 | 0.5 | ▲0.3 |
| SDLP | John; Hume | 17 | 1 (Note: Leader John Hume in the new seat of Foyle was a notional 'hold' on the new boundaries compared with 1979.) | 0 | 1 (Note: Gerry Fitt in Belfast West.) | ▼1 | 0.2 | 137,012 | 0.4 | Steady |
| Plaid Cymru | Dafydd; Wigley | 38 | 2 | 0 | 0 | Steady | 0.3 | 125,309 | 0.4 | Steady |
| Sinn Féin | Ruairí Ó Brádaigh | 14 | 1 (Note: Gerry Adams in Belfast West.) | Did not stand in 1979 | | ▲1 | 0.2 | 102,701 | 0.3 | —N/a |
| Alliance | Oliver; Napier | 12 | 0 | 0 | 0 | Steady | — | 61,275 | 0.2 | ▼0.1 |
| Ecology | Multiple; Leaders | 109 | 0 | 0 | 0 | Steady | — | 54,299 | 0.2 | ▲0.1 |
| Independent | —N/a | 85 (Note: Includes official Liberal candidates who were not given national Alliance endorsement against SDP candidates in three constituencies: Liverpool Broadgreen, Hackney South and Shoreditch, and Hammersmith.) | 0 | 0 | 0 | Steady | — | 35,482 | 0.1 | ▲0.1 |
| National; Front | Andrew; Brons | 60 | 0 | 0 | 0 | Steady | — | 27,065 | 0.1 | ▼0.5 |
| UPUP | James; Kilfedder | 1 | 1 (Note: James Kilfedder in North Down.) | New | | ▲1 | 0.2 | 22,861 | 0.1 | New |
| Independent; Labour | —N/a | 8 | 0 | 0 | 0 | Steady | — | 17,077 | 0.1 | Steady |
| Workers' Party | Tomás; Mac Giolla | 14 | 0 | 0 | 0 | Steady | — | 14,650 | 0.0 | Steady |
| BNP | John; Tyndall | 54 | 0 | New | | | — | 14,621 | 0.0 | New |
| Independent; Conservative | —N/a | 11 | 0 | 0 | 0 | Steady | — | 13,086 | 0.1 | Steady |
| Communist | Gordon; McLennan | 35 | 0 | 0 | 0 | Steady | — | 11,606 | 0.0 | ▼0.1 |
| Independent; Socialist | —N/a | 1 (Note: Candidate Gerry Fitt in Belfast West.) | 0 | New | | | — | 10,326 | 0.0 | New |
| Workers; Revolutionary | Michael; Banda | 21 | 0 | 0 | 0 | Steady | — | 3,798 | 0.0 | Steady |
| Monster Raving Loony | David; Sutch | 12 (Note: Figure includes two candidates who simply stood as 'Loony Society' candidates in Dulwich and Kingston-upon-Thames.) | 0 | New | | | — | 3,623 | 0.0 | New |
| Pro-Corporal; Punishment | —N/a | 3 | 0 | New | | | — | 2,113 | 0.0 | New |
| Wessex Regionalists | Alexander; Thynn | 10 | 0 | 0 | 0 | Steady | — | 1,750 | 0.0 | Steady |
| Anti-Common; Market | —N/a | 3 | 0 | 0 | 0 | Steady | — | 1,177 | 0.0 | Steady |
| Mebyon; Kernow | Richard; Jenkin | 2 | 0 | 0 | 0 | Steady | — | 1,151 | 0.0 | Steady |
| Independent; DUP | —N/a | 1 (Note: Candidate William Campbell Gault stood in Belfast North.) | 0 | New | | | — | 1,134 | 0.0 | New |
| Independent; Communist | —N/a | 1 (Note: Candidate Ronald Parkinson stood in Hertsmere.) | 0 | Did not stand in 1979 | | | — | 1,116 | 0.0 | —N/a |
| Associates with Licences | —N/a | 4 | 0 | New | | | — | 934 | 0.0 | New |
| Nationalist Party | Andrew; Fountaine | 5 | 0 | New | | | — | 874 | 0.0 | New |
| Independent; Liberal | —N/a | 2 | 0 | New | | | — | 656 | 0.0 | New |
| Labour and Trade Union | Peter; Hadden | 1 (Note: Candidate Frances Cullen stood in Belfast East.) | 0 | New | | | — | 584 | 0.0 | New |
| Revolutionary Communist | Frank; Furedi | 3 | 0 | New | | | — | 581 | 0.0 | New |
| Spare the Earth | —N/a | 1 (Note: Candidate Thomas Layton stood in Hove.) | 0 | New | | | — | 524 | 0.0 | New |
| Women for Life on Earth | —N/a | 1 (Note: Candidate R. Johnson stood in Henley.) | 0 | New | | | — | 517 | 0.0 | New |
| Parties with fewer than 500 votes each | | 48 | 0 | —N/a | | | — | 8,360 | 0.0 | —N/a |
| Other non-contested | | 0 | 0 | —N/a | | ▼4 (Note: 2 Independent Unionist seats: James Kilfedder retained North Down but with his own party; the new seat of Strangford was a notional seat for Independent Unionist.; 1 Independent Republican seat of Fermanagh and South Tyrone.; 1 United Ulster Unionist Party seat of Mid Ulster.) | — | 0 | 0.0 | —N/a |
| Blank and invalid votes | | | | | | | | 51,104 | — | — |
| Total | | 2,578 | 650 | | | 0 | 100.0 | 30,671,137 (Note: All valid votes excluding spoiled votes.) | 100.0 | 0.0 |
| Registered voters, and turnout | | | | | | | | 42,197,344 | 72.7 | ▼3.3 |

=== 1987 general election ===

UK general election 1987All parties gaining over 500 votes listed.
| | | Candidates | | | | | | Votes | | |
| Party | Leader | Stood | Elected | Gained | Unseated | Net | % of total | % | No. | Net % |
|---|---|---|---|---|---|---|---|---|---|---|
| Conservative | Margaret Thatcher | 633 | 376 | 9 | 30 | −21 | 57.85 | 42.2 | 13,760,583 | −0.2 |
| Labour | Neil Kinnock | 633 (Note: Includes 20 Co-operative Party candidates, as part of the Labour-Co-op alliance) | 229 (Note: Includes 9 Co-operative Party MPs, as part of the Labour-Co-op alliance) | 26 | 6 | +20 (Note: Includes +2 Co-operative Party MPs, as part of the Labour-Co-op alliance) | 35.23 (Note: Includes 1.4% for the Co-operative Party, as part of the Labour-Co-op alliance) | 30.8 (Note: Includes 1.0% for the Co-operative Party, as part of the Labour-Co-op alliance) | 10,029,807 (Note: Includes 334,132 for the Co-operative Party, as part of the Labour-Co-op alliance) | +3.2 (Note: Includes +0.0% for the Co-operative Party, as part of the Labour-Co-op alliance) |
| Alliance | David Owen & David Steel | 633 | 22 | 5 | 6 | −1 | 3.38 | 22.6 | 7,341,633 | −2.8 |
| SNP | Gordon Wilson | 72 | 3 | 3 | 2 | +1 | 0.46 | 1.3 | 416,473 | +0.2 |
| UUP | James Molyneaux | 12 | 9 | 0 | 2 | −2 | 1.38 | 0.8 | 276,230 | 0.0 |
| SDLP | John Hume | 13 | 3 | 2 | 0 | +2 | 0.46 | 0.5 | 154,067 | +0.1 |
| Plaid Cymru | Dafydd Elis-Thomas | 38 | 3 | 1 | 0 | +1 | 0.46 | 0.4 | 123,599 | 0.0 |
| Green | N/A | 133 | 0 | 0 | 0 | 0 | | 0.3 | 89,753 | +0.1 |
| DUP | Ian Paisley | 4 | 3 | 0 | 0 | 0 | 0.46 | 0.3 | 85,642 | −0.2 |
| Sinn Féin | Gerry Adams | 14 | 1 | 0 | 0 | 0 | 0.15 | 0.3 | 83,389 | 0.0 |
| Alliance | John Alderdice | 16 | 0 | 0 | 0 | 0 | | 0.2 | 72,671 | 0.0 |
| Workers' Party | Tomás Mac Giolla | 14 | 0 | 0 | 0 | 0 | | 0.1 | 19,294 | +0.1 |
| UPUP | James Kilfedder | 1 | 1 | 0 | 0 | 0 | 0.15 | 0.1 | 18,420 | 0.0 |
| Real Unionist | Robert McCartney | 1 | 0 | 0 | 0 | 0 | | 0.1 | 14,467 | N/A |
| Communist | Gordon McLennan | 19 | 0 | 0 | 0 | 0 | | 0.0 | 6,078 | 0.0 |
| Protestant Unionist | George Seawright | 1 | 0 | 0 | 0 | 0 | | 0.0 | 5,671 | N/A |
| Red Front | N/A | 14 | 0 | 0 | 0 | 0 | | 0.0 | 3,177 | N/A |
| Orkney and Shetland Movement | John Goodlad | 1 | 0 | 0 | 0 | 0 | | 0.0 | 3,095 | N/A |
| Moderate Labour | Brian Marshall | 2 | 0 | 0 | 0 | 0 | | 0.0 | 2,269 | N/A |
| Monster Raving Loony | Screaming Lord Sutch | 5 | 0 | 0 | 0 | 0 | | 0.0 | 1,951 | 0.0 |
| Workers Revolutionary | Sheila Torrance | 10 | 0 | 0 | 0 | 0 | | 0.0 | 1,721 | 0.0 |
| Independent Liberal | N/A | 1 | 0 | 0 | 0 | 0 | | 0.0 | 686 | 0.0 |
| BNP | John Tyndall | 2 | 0 | 0 | 0 | 0 | | 0.0 | 553 | 0.0 |
| Spare the Earth | N/A | 1 | 0 | 0 | 0 | 0 | | 0.0 | 522 | N/A |

| Government's new majority | 102 |
|---|---|
| Total votes cast | 32,529,578 |
| Turnout | 75.3% |
