= Peace and Progress Party =

Peace and Progress
- Founder: Vanessa Redgrave; Corin Redgrave
- Founded: November 27, 2004
- Dissolved: 2015
- Split from: Marxist Party
- Headquarters: 54–57 Allison Street, Birmingham, B5 5TH
- Ideology: Human rights Pacifism; Anti-Iraq War
- Political position: Left-wing

The Peace and Progress Party was a British political party founded by Vanessa and Corin Redgrave to campaign for human rights. Combining the Redgraves, formerly leading figures in the Workers' Revolutionary Party and the Marxist Party, with others from the media and legal fields, the party campaigned for the rights of refugees and political dissidents.

== History ==
The party was launched in November 2004 and called for the withdrawal of British troops from Iraq, the return of British detainees from Guantanamo Bay and the cancellation of Third World debt. The party urged support from those in other parties, including the Conservatives, who upheld human rights.

The party received the support of journalist Anna Politkovskaya, who was later murdered, and of Azmat Begg, father of Guantanamo Bay detainee Moazzam Begg, who stood for the party at the 2005 general election in Birmingham Hodge Hill. The party had suggested that Moazzem Begg and another detainee, Richard Belmar, would stand as absentee candidates. Babar Ahmad, wanted by the US authorities on terrorism charges, stood in Brent North. Peace and Progress made a negligible impact at the 2005 general election, losing their deposit in each of the three seats they stood in. Ahmad received 685 votes (1.9%), Azmat Begg received 329 votes (1.2%), and Sylvia Dunn received 22 votes (0.1%) against Conservative leader Michael Howard in Folkestone and Hythe.

According to the Electoral Commission, Chris Cooper was the party's leader, Sue Conlan the nominating officer, and Edmund Quinn the treasurer. The party registered in 2003 and deregistered in 2015. The official website is now offline.

== See also ==
- Peace Party (UK)
