= David North (socialist) =

American Marxist theoretician (born 1950)

- North in 2026

Chairman of the Socialist Equality Party
- Incumbent
- Assumed office August 2008
- National Secretary: Joseph Kishore
- Preceded by: Position established

Personal details
- Born: 1950 (age 75–76)
- Occupation: Author; Activist

David Waghalter Green, more commonly known by his penname David North, is an American Marxist, who has been active in the international Trotskyist movement since 1971. He is currently the National Chairman of the Socialist Equality Party in the United States (SEP), formerly the Workers League, and previously served as its National Secretary until the party's congress in 2008. North chairs the International Editorial Board of the World Socialist Web Site (WSWS), published by the International Committee of the Fourth International.

North has written numerous books and articles on the topics of socialism, Marxist history, and politics.

== Family and early years ==
North was born in January 1950 and studied history in Connecticut, an alum of Trinity College '71. He is the grandson of composer Ignatz Waghalter and has one younger brother.

== Political life ==
North says he drifted towards socialism after being politicized by Vietnam War-era protests before discovering the works of Leon Trotsky in the fall of 1969. He referenced the assassinations of Robert Kennedy and Martin Luther King Jr., "I am 19 years old and I have seen two men shot on television." That year he began accruing college credit by helping the office of Senator Vance Hartke write speeches.

The Trinity Tripod in 1970 reports him offering an official student-taught course titled "Russia and Revolution: 1894-1941" which centered on "the development of the Marxist revolutionary movement."

=== Workers League ===
As a member of the Workers League, he diverged from his college peers by decrying what he considered "protest politics" being used to oppose the Vietnam War, advocating instead to "build a labor party in this country." This proposal was defeated over concerns of feasibility. As early as 1972, he began writing articles under the penname "David North" in The Bulletin. North is cited in Feminist Studies for his coverage of the 1983-1986 Phelps Dodge miners strike.

North helped lead the investigation initiated by the International Committee into the circumstances surrounding the assassination of Leon Trotsky in 1940 and the extensive infiltration of the Fourth International by agents of both the Soviet secret police and the US Federal Bureau of Investigation.

==== Split with the WRP ====
In 1982, North informed the Workers Revolutionary Party (WRP), the British section of the ICFI and close collaborator of the Workers League, of his political differences with the organization. North's 1982 and 1984 documents were redistributed throughout the ICFI and to the WRP membership in August 1985. WRP leader Gerry Healy was expelled on October 19, 1985 by the party's Central Committee. Other party members, Cliff Slaughter and Michael Banda, had accused Healy of defaming North among other serious allegations.

In response to Banda's later denunciation of the Fourth International, he wrote The Heritage We Defend, reviewing the history of Trotskyism through 1986.

=== Socialist Equality Party ===
At the founding congress of the Socialist Equality Party (US), held in August 2008, North was elected as the national chairman of the party. As part of his political activism, in 2018 North undertook a speaking tour to celebrate the 80th anniversary of the "Fourth International" founded by Leon Trotsky.

In a 2018 interview with the German newspaper Neues Deutschland, North stated that socialism “means equality” and explained that this understanding is reflected in the name of the Socialist Equality Party. He argued that escalating global inequality and militarism are generating conditions for a new revolutionary movement and concluded that “socialism is coming back.”

== Views ==
=== Marxism ===
North has argued that Trotskyism is the modern development of Marx, continuing into the 21st century. He views it as contemporary possible alternative to Stalinism, therefore stating that the USSR collapse does not mean Marxism is a failed project. He believes that contrary to modern academic traditions, Marxism is not defined by academics, but instead by Marxist organizations and Marxist struggle. He writes that this tradition is represented above all by the Trotskyist opposition to Stalinism and its contemporary continuity in the Socialist Equality Party.

=== Censorship ===
In 2017, North alleged in an open letter that changes to Google's ranking system and search engine, known as Project Owl, demoted left-wing outlets such as the WSWS. Google would not comment to The New York Times about the WSWS. Interviewed by the NYT, North said that he opposed censorship under the pretext of combating fake news: "I'm against censorship in any form. It's up to people what they want to read."

=== Identity politics ===
North's views on identity-based politics has shifted over time. As a student in 1969, he condemned what he viewed as a lack of action by his college's administration to combat racism on campus, arguing that Trinity College "must make some sort of special commitment to black students" as redress. Most of his political career as a socialist would oppose similar initiatives focused on particular identities. In 2020 he wrote two open letters directed towards his alma mater opposing what he called a "reactionary racialist" narrative being promoted.

North argues that politics based around identity conceal class conflict, saying it uses democratic slogans while promoting the socioeconomic interests of the affluent and rich. Interviewed by journalist Chris Hedges in 2018, North stated that while middle class groups promoted identity politics as a response to social tensions and poverty, American workers were not racist and "have a deep belief in democratic rights".

=== Nationalism ===
He expressed vocal support for the Scottish National Party as a student, declaring "I believe in an independent Scotland". When historian Samuel Kassow questioned equivocating Ukraine with "Putin’s fascist regime" in an email exchange, North responded that Ukrainian nationalism had a "genocidal record" which still impacts modern day.

=== United States ===
A 1968 Trinity Tripod article by North a week after Richard Nixon won the presidential election expressed "utter contempt of the man". Speaking about the 2016 United States presidential election, North told Neues Deutschland that Donald Trump "embodies a cross between all the criminal and immoral features and machinations of the real estate, finance, gambling and entertainment industries". North expressed criticism of the Democratic Party as well, describing the party's presidential candidate Hillary Clinton as "an iron lady of Wall Street and the military-intelligence establishment."

== Reception ==
=== Political ===
Other Trotskyist organizations have raised issues with North for various reasons. The Spartacist League criticized North for what it deems "U.S. Healyite 'colorblind' economism" that ignores racial disparities in addition to class. Gilbert Achcar, formerly a member of the Lebanese Revolutionary Communist Group, described North as an "apologist for Putin, Assad, and their friends."

Birbeck University professor John Kelly considers North "an immodest and arrogant individual" who views the ICFI he chairs as the "only one genuine Trotskyist party". Historian Aidan Beatty views North as secretive of his past, comparing him negatively to Gerry Healy. Corinna Lotz and Paul Feldman, contemporaries of North in the 1980s, criticized him alongside Michael Banda and Cliff Slaughter in their 1994 book defending Healy after what they deem "the coup against the ICFI in 1985."

=== Scholarly ===
Historian Bertrand Patenaude considered North's response to Robert Service "Strong words, but entirely justified" despite initially expecting “a predictable polemical diatribe from the radical left”, ultimately determining that “Service’s book is completely unreliable as a reference”. Russian historian Dr. Liudmila Novikova was not as convinced by his accusations against Service, though similarly found North's "language is highly combative and, unfortunately, often aggressive." Prof. Daniel Gaido supports what he views as an "incisive refutation" of Service, but contends that North is limited in referencing English scholarship of the topic. Antony Kalashnikov is much more critical, calling certain claims "counter-factual" and which "suffers from superficiality".

Reviewing North's 2015 book, San Diego State University professor Emanuele Saccarelli wrote "In spite of its somewhat unusual character" and clear partisanship, it was worth recommending to a "broad multidisciplinary audience." Sociologist Charles Thorpe praised his 2014 collection, finding it to be a convincing argument and "far‐reaching critique of post‐modern pseudo‐radicalism".

== Works ==
=== Books ===
- North, David (1988). The heritage we defend: A contribution to the history of the Fourth International. Detroit, Mich: Labor Publications. ISBN 0-929087-00-3. (Preface via World Socialist Web Site)
- North, David (1989). Perestroika versus socialism: Stalinism and the restoration of capitalism in the USSR. Detroit, Mich: Labor Publications. ISBN 0-929087-39-9. OCLC 21203230.
- North, David (1991). Gerry Healy and his place in the history of the Fourth International. Detroit: Labor Publications. ISBN 978-0-929087-58-0.
- North, David (2004). The crisis of American democracy: The presidential elections of 2000 and 2004. Oak Park, Mich. Bankstown, NSW: Mehring Books. ISBN 1-875639-36-5.
- North, David (2007). Marxism, history & socialist consciousness. Oak Park, Mich: Mehring Books. ISBN 978-1-893638-03-7.
- North, David (2007). Leon Trotsky & the Post-Soviet school of historical falsification. Oak Park, MI: Mehring Books. ISBN 978-1-893638-02-0.
- North, David (2010). In defense of Leon Trotsky. Oak Park, Michigan: Mehring Books. ISBN 978-1-893638-05-1.
- The Russian Revolution and the Unfinished 20th Century (2014) ISBN 978-1-893638-40-2
- North, David (2015). The Frankfurt School, Postmodernism and the Politics of the Pseudo-Left: AMarxist Critique. Oak Park, Michigan: Mehring Books. ISBN 978-1-893638-50-1.
- North, David (2016). A Quarter Century of War: The US Drive for Global Hegemony 1990-2016. Oak Park, Michigan: Mehring Books. ISBN 978-1-893638-69-3.
- North, David (2021). The New York Times' 1619 Project and the racialist falsification of history: Essays and interviews. Oak Park, Michigan: Mehring Books. ISBN 978-1-893638-93-8.
- North, David (2023). Leon Trotsky and the Struggle for Socialism in the Twenty-First Century. Oak Park, Michigan: Mehring Books. ISBN 978-1-959-124-02-3.
- North, David (2024). The Logic of Zionism: From nationalist myth to the Gaza genocide. Oak Park, Michigan: Mehring Books. ISBN 978-1-959124-08-5.
- North, David (2025). Sounding the Alarm: Socialism Against War. Oak Park, Michigan: Mehring Books. ISBN 978-1-959124-10-8.

=== Other publications ===
- The USSR And Socialism: The Trotskyist Perspective (1989) ISBN 0-929087-45-3
- In Defense of the Russian Revolution: A Reply to the Post-Soviet School of Historical Falsification (1995) ISBN 978-0-929087-72-6
- Socialism, Historical Truth and the Crisis of Political Thought in the United States (1996) ISBN 978-0-929087-73-3
- Workers League and the Founding of the Socialist Equality Party (1996) ISBN 978-0-929087-74-0
- Equality, the Rights of Man and the Birth of Socialism (1996) ISBN 1-873045-32-8
- Anti-Semitism, Fascism and the Holocaust: A critical review of Daniel Goldhagen's "Hitler's Willing Executioners" (1997) ISBN 978-0-929087-75-7
- A Tribute to Tom Henehan: 1951 to 1977 (1998) ISBN 978-0-929087-78-8
- Ernest Mandel 1923–1995: A Critical Assessment of His Role in the History of the Fourth International (1997) ISBN 1-875639-14-4
- Marxism and the Trade Unions (1998) ISBN 1-875639-29-2
- Leon Trotsky and Fate of Socialism in 20th Century: A Reply to Professor Eric Hobsbawm (1998) ISBN 1-875639-22-5
- Reform and Revolution in the Epoch of Imperialism (1998) ISBN 1-875639-28-4
- After the Slaughter: Political Lessons of the Balkan War (1999) ISBN 1-875639-35-7
- A Tribute to Vadim Rogovin (1999) ISBN 978-0-929087-50-4
- The Economic Crisis & the Return of History (2011) ISBN 978-1-893638-14-3

== See also ==
- James P. Cannon
