= Workers International to Rebuild the Fourth International =

British Trotskyist group

The Workers International to Rebuild the Fourth International (WIRFI) was a Trotskyist international organisation. It was established in the United Kingdom in 1990, following a split from the Workers Revolutionary Party. It was considered part of the radical branch of Trotskyism, and was led by Bob Archer. It ceased operation in 2015.

== History ==
In 1985 the Workers Revolutionary Party (UK) (WRP) underwent a fragmentation which split the organization apart after the ousting of its leader, Gerry Healy. Initially the organization split into two: with the WRP remaining under the leadership of Sheila Torrence and a splinter group attached to the Workers Press being led by Cliff Slaughter. Infighting continued to divide and fracture these groups, and ultimately, seven new organizations formed out of this split, one of which was the Workers International to Rebuild the Fourth International (WIRFI).

The WIRFI was founded in 1990 under the leadership of Bob Archer. The prominent British economist Geoff Pilling was one of the organization's founding members, and Dot Gibson served as the secretary of the organization. The WIRFI initially had support in the Workers Revolutionary Party (Namibia) and a South African section which renamed itself WIRFI and took part in the historic 1994 South African general election after the end of apartheid. The majority of the South African section left the international in 1996 and renamed itself the Workers International Vanguard League. The organization published the online periodical, the Journal of the Workers International to Rebuild the Fourth International.

In Britain, the group's supporters were active in the Socialist Alliance and then the Democracy Platform of that grouping. By 2004 they had also become involved with the Liverpool-based Campaign for a Mass Workers Party and its offshoot, the United Socialist Party. The organization disbanded in 2015.

== See also ==
- List of Trotskyist internationals
