= WIVL =

WIVL may refer to:

- Workers International Vanguard League, Trotskyist organization in South Africa
- WLYG, a radio station (88.3 FM) licensed to Jasper, Georgia, United States, which held the call sign WIVL from 2008 to 2014
