= Rachel Kempson =

British actress (1910–2003)

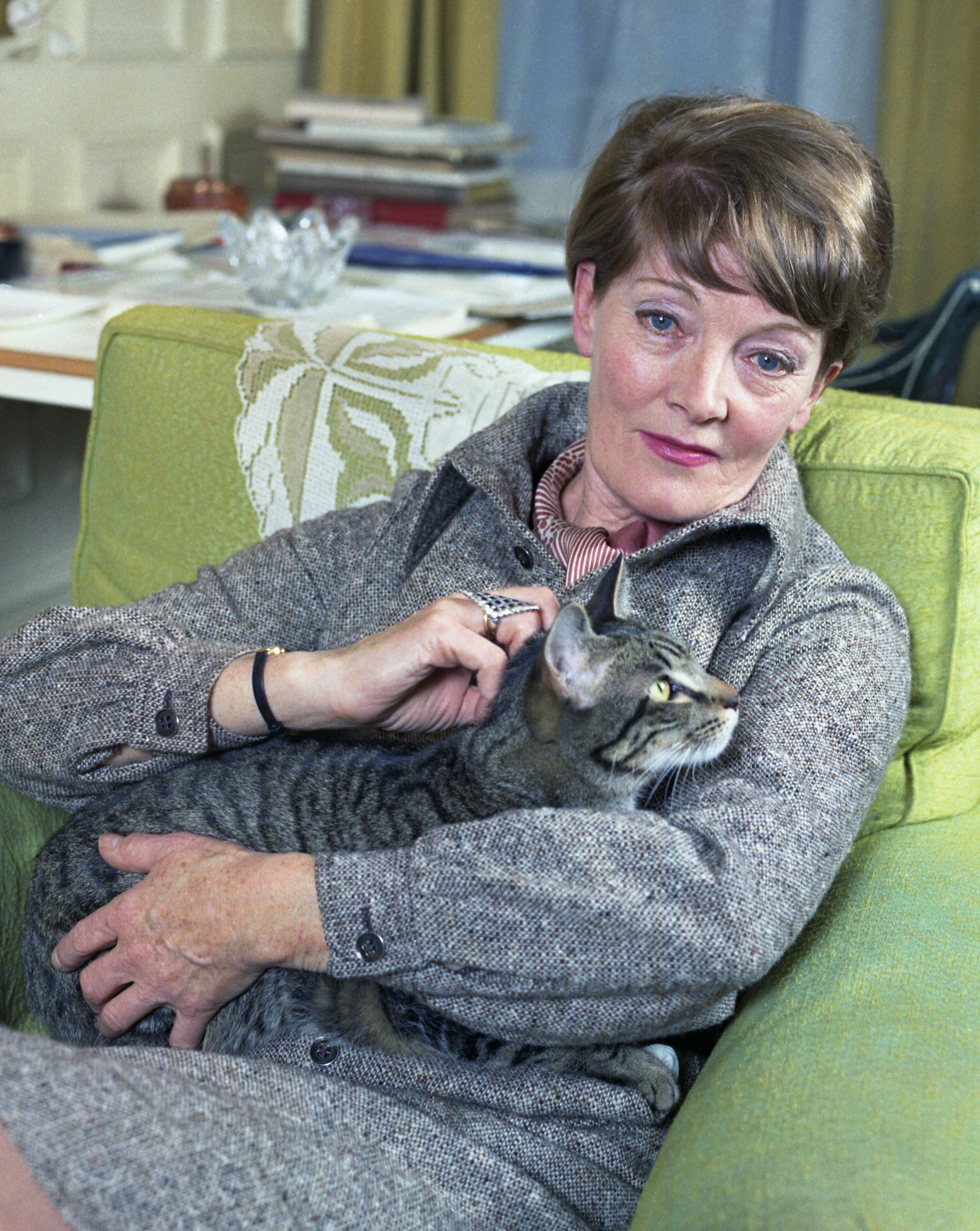
- Kempson in 1974
- Born: 28 May 1910; Dartmouth, Devon, England
- Died: 24 May 2003 (aged 92); Millbrook, New York, US
- Citizenship: United Kingdom
- Education: Royal Academy of Dramatic Art
- Occupation: Actress
- Years active: 1938–1997
- Spouse: Michael Redgrave (m. 1935; died 1985)
- Children: Vanessa; Corin; Lynn
- Family: Kempson, Redgrave

Rachel, Lady Redgrave (28 May 1910 – 24 May 2003), known primarily by her birth name, Rachel Kempson, was an English actress. She married Michael Redgrave, and was the matriarch of the famous acting dynasty.

== Early life ==
Kempson was born in Dartmouth, Devon, the daughter of Eric William Edward Kempson, who became headmaster of the Royal Naval College, and Beatrice Hamilton, daughter of Laurence (all other sources give "Lawrence") Thomas Ashwell, of London, a homeopathic pharmacist.

== Career ==
Kempson trained at RADA before joining the Royal Shakespeare Company. She married Michael Redgrave in 1935 and the couple appeared together many times on stage. She also appeared many times on film and television, most notably in the films The Captive Heart, The Sea Shall Not Have Them (both opposite her husband Michael), The Jokers, Two Gentlemen Sharing, Out of Africa, Uncle Vanya; and the television series Tales of Unease, ('It's too Late Now', episode, 1970), Jennie: Lady Randolph Churchill (1974), and The Jewel in the Crown. She made three films with her daughter Lynn (Tom Jones, Georgy Girl and The Virgin Soldiers), and two films with her other daughter Vanessa (The Charge of the Light Brigade – which also starred her son Corin – and Déjà Vu). Her 1986 autobiography, Life Among the Redgraves was published by Dutton. According to Publishers Weekly, "Lady Redgrave writes with candour, wit, restraint and some sadness about her background, beginnings in the theatre in 1932, marriage and motherhood, the trials of moving and the problems of being married to a handsome matinee idol."

== Personal life and death ==
Kempson married fellow actor Michael Redgrave in 1935, and became the daughter-in-law of Roy Redgrave and Margaret Scudamore. Kempson was the mother of Vanessa (born 1937), Corin (1939–2010) and Lynn Redgrave (1943–2010) and the grandmother of Joely and Natasha Richardson (1963–2009), Jemma Redgrave, Luke Redgrave, Arden Redgrave, Harvey Redgrave, Carlo Gabriel Nero, Benjamin B. Clark, Kelly B. Clark and Annabel Lucy Clark.

In 1959, her husband was knighted, and she formally became Lady Redgrave. However, she refused to use her title professionally. In 2003, she died, aged 92, of a stroke at the home of her granddaughter, Natasha Richardson, in Millbrook, New York. Richardson died on 18 March 2009 in a skiing accident and was buried near Kempson. Kempson's youngest daughter, Lynn Redgrave, was buried in the same cemetery on 8 May 2010, near Kempson and Richardson.

== Filmography ==
Year	Title	Role	Notes
1941	Jeannie	Maggie, Jeannie's sister	
1946	The Captive Heart	Celia Mitchell	
1948	A Woman's Vengeance	Emily Maurier	
1954	The Sea Shall Not Have Them	Mrs. Waltby	
1963	Tom Jones	Bridget Allworthy	
1964	The Third Secret	Mildred Hoving	
1965	Curse of the Fly	Madame Fournier	
1966	Georgy Girl	Ellen Leamington	
1966	Grand Prix	Mrs. Stoddard	
1967	The Jokers	Mrs. Tremayne	
1968	The Charge of the Light Brigade	Mrs. Codrington	
1969	A Touch of Love	Sister Henry	
1969	Two Gentlemen Sharing	Mrs. Ashby-Kydd	
1969	The Virgin Soldiers	Mrs. Raskin	
1970	Jane Eyre	Mrs. Fairfax	
1980	Little Lord Fauntleroy	Lady Lorradaile	
1984	Camille	Hortense	TV film
1984	The Jewel in the Crown	Lady Ethel Manners	TV film
1985	Out of Africa	Lady Belfield	
1988	Stealing Heaven	Prioress	
1991	Uncle Vanya	Prioress	
1997	Déjà Vu	Skelly's Mother	

== See also ==
- List of British actors
