= Cliff Slaughter =

British socialist activist and writer (1928–2021)

- Born: Clifford Slaughter; 18 September 1928; Doncaster, West Riding of Yorkshire, United Kingdom
- Died: 3 May 2021 (aged 92); Leeds, Yorkshire, United Kingdom
- Education: Leeds Modern School
- Alma mater: Downing College, Cambridge
- Occupations: Socialist, activist, sociologist, author
- Political party: WIRFI
- Other political affiliations: WRP; WRP (WP)
- Spouse: Barbara Bennett
- Parents: Frederick Arthur Slaughter (father); Elizabeth Stokeld (mother)

Cliff Slaughter (18 September 1928 – 3 May 2021) was a British socialist activist, sociologist and author. His best-known works are Coal is Our Life (written with Norman Dennis and Fernando Henriques) and Marxism, Ideology and Literature. In 2006, Slaughter published the book Not Without a Storm: Towards a Communist Manifesto for the Age of Globalisation, followed by the book Bonfire of the Certainties: The Second Human Revolution in 2013.

== Biography ==
=== Early life ===
Clifford Slaughter was born in Doncaster in 1928 to Frederick Arthur Slaughter, a coalminer from Oxfordshire, and Annie Elizabeth Stokeld. The couple would later have two more children, Keith and Nancy. Slaughter was educated at Leeds Modern School, where he excelled academically, and completed his National Service by working as a miner at the Water Haigh Colliery in Woodlesford. While still at school he was awarded a scholarship to study history at Downing College, Cambridge, and after transferring to social anthropology graduated with a first-class degree in 1952. In October 1950, he married Barbara Bennett while studying at Cambridge.

Slaughter subsequently became a lecturer and writer on sociology and Marxism, and it was while working at the Universities of Leeds and Bradford that he first became an activist with the Communist Party of Great Britain. He left in 1956, following the Soviet invasion of Hungary, and joined Gerry Healy's group The Club. Slaughter remained with the group for almost 30 years, during which it became known as the Socialist Labour League and then as the Workers Revolutionary Party (WRP). He came to be regarded as one of the group's leading intellectuals, and remained on its Central Committee throughout.

=== Split in the WRP in 1985 ===
In 1985, Healy faced allegations of sexually harassing female members of the WRP, leading Cliff Slaughter and Michael Banda to oppose him. This broadened into a more general criticism of the party's direction. They were able to gain the support of a majority of the group, and forced Healy to retire. When Healy again tried to exert authority Slaughter and Banda led a call for "revolutionary morality" and expelled Healy and his supporters. This effectively split the organisation between their supporters and those of Healy and his ally Sheila Torrance.

Slaughter and Banda's group at first called itself the Workers Revolutionary Party (Workers Press). However, Banda soon left the group and repudiated Trotskyism. The international supporters of the group decided to call themselves the Workers International to Rebuild the Fourth International (WIRFI), and published both the Workers Press and the International journal. In the 1990s, the members of a sub-group within WIRFI influenced by Slaughter decided that the creation of an elite vanguard party was not the way to build towards socialism.

From the 1990s, Slaughter was increasingly influenced in his theoretical work by the writings of István Mészáros. In 2006, Slaughter published Not Without a Storm: Towards a Communist Manifesto for the Age of Globalisation, a book intended to open discussion of contemporary issues and the responsibility of socialists. Slaughter followed it with Bonfire of the Certainties: The Second Human Revolution, published by Lulu.com in 2013. Slaughter's final books were collaborative works with other socialists : Against Capital : Experiences of Class Struggle and Rethinking Revolutionary Agency and Women and The Social Revolution.

=== Movement for Socialism (Britain) ===
The work of Slaughter was the central theoretical and political influence in the Movement for Socialism (MFS) which was an occasional grouping of socialists in Britain. It originated from the one half (led by Slaughter and Banda) of the major split in the WRP in 1985. There is no indication of group political activities within the wider socialist movement by the MFS at the time of including this section. For example, it has no noticeable and socially active profile such as a website or Facebook page as of December 2022. (Note: This absence of an active profile may be explicable on the grounds that the MFS is simply a discussion circle of individual socialists who meet informally and occasionally but do not function as a politically coherent and socially active group as a whole as in the manner of other, more socially and politically active and gregarious left wing groups. For example, communicating by private emails, a private internet group, and phone calls, etc, in order to arrange such meetings for discussion without publicising their meetings and profile. In this latter case, the group would still exist as a discussion circle but knowledge of its existence would be largely confined to those who participate in it. Furthermore, if newcomers enter a discussion circle by invitation only and/or are subject to any existing 'political clearance procedures' within the circle, the group may have a natural tendency to maintain a mode of existence with a relatively private and intentionally or unintentionally inconspicuous political profile)

The split in the WRP in 1985 initially resulted in two groupings. One led by Slaughter and Banda and the other centred around Gerry Healy and Sheila Torrance. This former group then underwent further divisions and fissions. Banda left (or was expelled) to form the Communist Forum after distancing himself theoretically and politically from 'Trotskyism'. A further split occurred when the group's Bolshevik Faction left to form the International Socialist League in 1988. Following the transformation of the remaining group into the Movement for Socialism, another split occurred with the departure of a group of supporters who called themselves the Workers International to Rebuild the Fourth International.

=== Death ===
Slaughter died in Leeds, aged 92, on 3 May 2021.
