= World Socialist Web Site =

News website

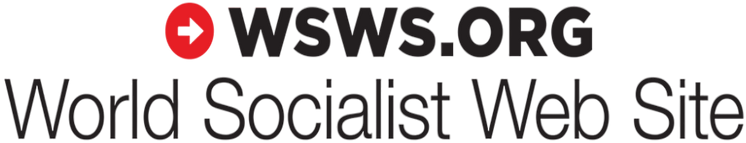
- Website type: News, Opinion and analysis
- Headquarters: Oak Park, Michigan, United States
- Owner: International Committee of the Fourth International
- Editor: David North (editorial board chairman)
- Website: wsws.org
- Registration: No (Disqus account is required for commenting on articles)
- Launched: February 14, 1998; 28 years ago
- Current status: Online

The World Socialist Web Site (WSWS) is an online news and opinion website founded in 1998, published by the International Committee of the Fourth International (ICFI). The WSWS advocates for working class organization and class struggle, declaring itself Trotskyist. The site is published in 31 languages and covers international affairs, workers struggles, art, science, and technology.

== History and content ==
The WSWS was established on February 14, 1998, then redesigned in 2008, and in 2020. The WSWS supports and helps campaign for the Socialist Equality Party in elections. The site has no advertisements, except for material from Mehring Books, the ICFI's publishing arm. David North serves as chairman of the site's International Editorial Board.

WSWS argues that rape allegations against Julian Assange are a "smear" pushed by US and UK media "to curry favor with Washington".

It is anti-war, and its founder David North says he is "against censorship in any form".

=== Serbia, Afghanistan, Iraq, and Libya ===
The WSWS opposed wars in Serbia in 1998-1999, Afghanistan from 2001-2021, Iraq from 2003-2011, and Libya in 2011.

=== Russia and Ukraine ===
The WSWS described the 2014 Revolution of Dignity in Ukraine as a coup d'état backed by the United States and Germany and carried out by the Ukrainian far-right coalition Right Sector. The WSWS criticized the coverage of the Russo-Ukrainian War in 2014 by the most German media outlets, describing it as one-sided and anti-Russian propaganda.

The WSWS condemned the 2022 Russian invasion of Ukraine and called for Russian and Ukrainian workers to unite against war. It wrote that the US and NATO had "incited the invasion" and were "prepared to take the world to the brink of nuclear war". It said "in opposing the invasion of Ukraine, we denounce the policies of US/NATO imperialism."

==== Bogdan Syrotiuk treason charge ====
In 2024, the WSWS accused the Security Service of Ukraine (SBU) of political repression for arresting Bogdan Syrotiuk, the then 25-year-old leader of the Young Guard of Bolshevik-Leninists (YGBL), a Trotskyist organization banned in Ukraine. He was charged with treason for writing articles for the WSWS, for which he was paid, which allegedly sought to justify Russian aggression against Ukraine. His articles said that the war was "unleashed" by the U.S. and NATO, and described the Ukrainian authorities as "bourgeois nationalists" in the service of the West. WSWS was blocked in Ukraine from June 2024.

The WSWS has campaigned for his release. In 2026, a Ukrainian court found him guilty of treason and sentenced him to 15 years' imprisonment. The court ruled that the WSWS is a "communist-oriented propaganda and news agency" that disseminates Russian propaganda narratives.

=== Accusations of Google censorship ===
According to Julianne Tvetan writing in In These Times in July 2017, the WSWS drew attention to new Google search algorithms intended to remove fake news, which WSWS believed to be a form of censorship by Google. Using evidence from SEMrush, an analytics suite for search engine optimization, the WSWS alleged that several sites, such as AlterNet and Globalresearch.ca, had received reduced traffic from Google due to changes in its search algorithm. According to the WSWS, between late April 2017 and the beginning of August 2017 its Google search traffic fell by 67%. Google said that it had not deliberately targeted any particular website, and Google vice-president Ben Gomes wrote that Google had "adjusted [its] signals to help surface more authoritative pages and demote low-quality content."

=== 1619 Project ===
In 2019, WSWS received considerable attention for its criticisms of the New York Times' The 1619 Project, which aimed to reframe American history by placing the consequences of slavery and the contributions of Black Americans at the center of the country's national narrative. WSWS described the project as "one component of a deliberate effort to inject racial politics into the heart of the 2020 elections and foment divisions among the working class." According to The Washington Post:

On Dec. 16 [2020], Wall Street Journal opinion columnist Elliot Kaufman brought into the mainstream criticisms of the 1619 Project from four historians who had been questioning it for months on the World Socialist website, a fringe news publication founded upon the principles of Trotskyism. Some of what those professors wrote had gained momentum in the Twitterverse and sparked discussion about their analysis of the 1619 Project.

WSWS received considerable praise from both liberal historians who contributed to their analysis and conservative commentators for its criticisms. For example, the National Review described it as "one of the few media outlets examining the 1619 Project in critical detail" and extensively cited contributions by historians Gordon S. Wood, who in 2007 was referred to as "the favorite historian of America’s liberal establishment", and James M. McPherson; Phillip Magness, the research director of the right-wing American Institute for Economic Research told the Dartmouth Review that there was a "strange alliance" between conservative historians and the Trotskyists of WSWS, who he described as "old-school historians" following the data; and Michael Barone in the conservative New York Post gave positive attention to historian Sean Wilentz's criticisms of the project in WSWS.

== Criticism ==
The Ukrainian court that sentenced WSWS writer Bogdan Syrotiuk accused the website of disseminating Russian propaganda against Ukraine.

Reason has said that a 2020 viral false account of New York University agreeing to racially segregated student housing was partially due to an inaccurate report on the WSWS. Reason commented: "As a socialist publication, WSWS sometimes criticizes the progressive left for being preoccupied with issues unrelated to class."

Maria Haigh and Thomas Haigh of the University of Wisconsin–Milwaukee stated that WSWS publishers "challenge the view that fringe and highly partisan news websites and media ecosystems have contributed to the spread of fake news".
