= Movement for Socialism (Britain) =

Socialist labor group in the United Kingdom

- Founder: Cliff Slaughter; Michael Banda
- Founded: 1985
- Split from: Workers Revolutionary Party
- Newspaper: The News Line
- Ideology: Trotskyism
- Political position: Far-left

The Movement for Socialism is an occasional grouping of socialists in the United Kingdom. It originated as one half of the major split in the Workers Revolutionary Party of 1985. Initially, both halves continued under the WRP name and both published a newspaper named The News Line, originally named Workers Press.

== Workers' Revolutionary Party (Workers Press) ==
The group was initially led by Cliff Slaughter and Michael Banda, but Banda left in 1986 to form the Communist Forum. A further split occurred when the group's Bolshevik Faction left to form the International Socialist League in 1988. Following the transformation of the remaining group into Movement for Socialism, another split occurred with the departure of a group of supporters of the Workers International to Rebuild the Fourth International.

== See also ==
- Trotskyist Fraction – Fourth International
