= Marxist Party =

Defunct Trotskyist political party in the United Kingdom

- Leader: Gerry Healy
- Spokesperson: Vanessa Redgrave
- Founded: 1986
- Dissolved: 2004
- Split from: Workers Revolutionary Party
- Succeeded by: Peace and Progress Party
- Headquarters: London
- Newspaper: The Marxist
- Ideology: Trotskyism; Marxism
- International affiliation: ICFI

Website
- www.marxistparty.com

The Marxist Party was a Trotskyist political party in the United Kingdom. It was formed as a split from Sheila Torrance's Workers Revolutionary Party in 1986 by Gerry Healy and supporters including Vanessa and Corin Redgrave. At first, it was also known as the Workers Revolutionary Party, but it renamed itself later in the year. The party also maintained its own version of the International Committee of the Fourth International, although this was moribund by the late 1990s.

After the death of Healy in 1989, the party declined, and in 1990 expelled a group which became the Communist League.

The group, which called for support for the Liberal Democrats in the 2001 UK general election, published The Marxist magazine. They also famously owned Trotsky's death mask.

In April 2004, the Marxist Party announced its dissolution. The Redgraves then announced the formation of a new group named the Peace and Progress Party, supporting liberal principles of human rights.
