= Bogdan Syrotiuk =

Ukrainian Trotskyist activist

- Богдан Сиротюк
- Born: 1999 (age 26–27); Pervomaisk, Mykolaiv Oblast, Ukraine
- Organization: Young Guard of Bolshevik-Leninists
- Known for: Treason trial
- Movement: International Committee of the Fourth International
- Criminal charges: Treason
- Criminal penalty: 15 years in jail

Bogdan Syrotiuk (also Bohdan Syrotiuk) is a Ukrainian Trotskyist activist who was sentenced in August 2026 to 15 years in prison for treason. The court found that he had written and published articles for the World Socialist Web Site (WSWS) that "justified Russia's armed aggression against Ukraine". The security forces also seized Russian Armed Forces clothing from his property. Syrotiuk's defense centered around his openly-stated opposition to the Russian invasion. His supporters consider him a political prisoner.

He was born in Pervomaisk in 1999, and was leader of the Young Guard of Bolshevik-Leninists (MGBL), a Trotskyist youth organization that is banned in Ukraine.

== Arrest and conviction ==
From October 2022 to April 2024, Syrotiuk used pseudonyms to write and translate articles which were published on the World Socialist Web Site (WSWS) and on the social network VKontakte.

Syrotiuk was arrested on 25 April 2024 by the Security Service of Ukraine (SBU). The indictment charged him with treason for writing articles for a Russian propaganda agency (the WSWS) that allegedly sought to justify Russian aggression against Ukraine. In June 2024, the Ukrainian government blocked access to the World Socialist Web Site (WSWS) in the country.

The security forces searched Syrotiuk's basement, where they seized military equipment belonging to the Russian military, including shoulder patches with the inscription "Armed Forces of Russia". Investigators found correspondence between Syrotiuk, WSWS representatives, and a Russian citizen on his devices, and the court said Syrotiuk had requested and received monthly payment.

A linguistic expert analysis was commissioned by the court. It concluded that six articles written by Syrotiuk sought to justify Russia's armed aggression against Ukraine. In the articles, Syrotiuk claimed that the war was not started by Russia, but by the US and NATO, and referred to the Ukrainian government as "bourgeois nationalists" in the service of the West. One of the articles was about Stepan Bandera and the 14th Waffen Grenadier Division of the SS (1st Galician). The Pervomaisk court's judgment said that the articles Syrotiuk wrote constituted treason because of his "non-recognition of Ukraine's legitimately elected political leadership and democratic processes," "comparisons with fascists and Nazis," "negative assessments of Ukraine's Armed Forces" and "reinterpretation of national heroes and historical figures".

Syrotiuk's defense centered around his openly-stated opposition to the Russian invasion, and what it argued was the prosecution's failure to prove Syrotiuk had worked with a "foreign organisation" as required by the law on treason. The court rejected that defense, and said the WSWS was a foreign "communist-oriented propaganda and news agency" that publishes Russian propaganda against Ukraine.

In August 2026, Pervomaisky City and District Court found Sirotyuk guilty of treason under Article 111 of the Criminal Code of Ukraine and sentenced him to 15 years in prison. The sentence counts the two years since his arrest as time served. The court further ordered the destruction of the political literature and Russian military items seized with him and charged Syrotiuk over 178,000 hryvnias to help cover the cost of prosecuting him.

== Defense campaign ==
Since his arrest, the World Socialist Web Site (WSWS) has led a campaign for his release. It has been supported by Roger Waters Britain's Stop the War Coalition, historians Marta Havryshko, Mario Keßler and Grzegorz Rossoliński-Liebe. According to the WSWS, Canadian-American historian John-Paul Himka denounced the verdict, writing:

I thank God that I am a Canadian citizen, where there is no official cult of Holocaust perpetrators and ethnic cleansers and where I am allowed to express my opinion.

According to the WSWS, Ukrainian criminologist Yuri Irkhin "examined Bogdan Syrotiuk's writings and found in them no statements, phrases, sentences, or word combinations supporting any actions of the Russian military". The website claimed the court did not address Irkhin's report.

In July 2025, according to the WSWS, the European Court of Human Rights accepted Syrotiuk's case for review, but has not yet ruled on it.
