= Margaret Scudamore =

British theatre and film actress (1881–1958)

- Born: Daisy Bertha Mary Scudamore; 13 November 1880; Portsmouth, England
- Died: 5 October 1958 (aged 77); London, England
- Occupation: Actress
- Years active: 1902–1952
- Spouses: Roy Redgrave (m. 1907; died 1922) James P. Anderson (m. 1922)
- Children: Michael Redgrave
- Relatives: See Redgrave family

Margaret Scudamore (13 November 1880 – 5 October 1958) was an English theatre and film actress who began in ingenue roles before achieving a prolonged career in stage and screen support roles. She and her first husband, Roy Redgrave (1873–1922), are considered to be the first members of the now renowned Redgrave acting dynasty.

== Life and career ==
Margaret was born Daisy Bertha Mary Scudamore in Portsmouth, she was the youngest of five children of William George, a shipwright at HM Portsmouth, and Clara (née Linington), all residing at 7 Melbourne Place, Southsea. She left home as a teenager and found her way to the London offices of theatrical agent, Sir John Denton. Mistaking her for Mary Scudamore, the young daughter of a well-known actor-playwright-manager Fortunatus Augustine Davis who had added "Scudmore" to his surname many years before, Sir John gave Daisy the unrelated Scudamore's address at Castelnau Mansions, Barnes, London. Fortunatus, a "most cheerful" man, welcomed Daisy into the household and she lived with his wife and children for a time until he found work for her as an actress in London.

Over half a century later, an erroneous report that she was the daughter of Fortunatus in her Times obituary of 8 October 1958 was frequently repeated in other articles, even as late as 2003 in The Daily Telegraph until new Scudamore family research a few years after.

While appearing in repertory at the Grand Theatre, Brighton, she met the divorced actor Roy Redgrave who had just returned from an initial period in Australia. Still called Daisy, she married Redgrave at Glasgow Register Office in 1907 while they were touring in the north, and on 20 March 1908 she gave birth to a son, Michael Redgrave, who went on to be knighted during a distinguished cinema and theatre career.

Six months after Michael's birth, Redgrave left his wife and returned to Australia again, this time permanently. After the dissolution of her marriage to Redgrave – about four years after Michael's birth – she adopted the stage name of Margaret Scudamore and continued acting in character roles. As Margaret she later married Captain James P. "Andy" Anderson, a tea planter formerly employed by the Ceylon and Eastern Agency, in London in 1922. They had a daughter together, Peg. Following Redgrave's departure, Scudamore achieved a successful career as a supporting actress in films as well as the theatre, beginning screen roles during the silent film era and culminating with character parts in two notable Powell and Pressburger films. Her grandchildren, Corin Redgrave, Lynn Redgrave and Vanessa Redgrave and great-grandchildren Jemma Redgrave, Joely Richardson, Natasha Richardson and Carlo Nero, have successfully followed the family tradition into acting.

== Selected theatre work ==
- 1921 (23 April – 21 May) – At the Stratford Birthday Festival at the Shakespeare Memorial Theatre in Stratford-upon-Avon, England, in plays directed by W. Bridges-Adams, with fellow cast members Baliol Holloway, Percy Rhodes, Dorothy Green, Arthur Keane, Edmund Willard, George Zucco, Gwen Richardson, Mabel Todd, Maurice Colbourne, Vivienne Bennett, Rosa Burgess and Natalie Moya, performing in:
  - Shakespeare's "A Midsummer Night's Dream".
  - Shakespeare's "The Merry Wives of Windsor".
  - Shakespeare's "King Richard III".
  - Richard Brinsley Sheridan's play, "The School for Scandal".
  - Shakespeare's "Macbeth".
- 1922–23 (7 September – February) – In Rudolf Besier and May Edginton's play "Secrets," at the Comedy Theatre in London, with Fay Compton, Henry Vibart, Dorothy Holmes-Gore, Louise Hampton, Leon Quartermaine, Tom Reynolds, and Helen Haye in the cast.
- 1923 – In Rudolf Besier and May Edginton's play "Secrets," at the Comedy Theatre in London, with Fay Compton, Doris Mansell, Fabia Drake, Bobbie Andrews, Cecil Trouncer, Hubert Harben, Louise Hampton, Dorothy Holmes-Gore, Ian Fleming, and Mary Clare in the cast.
- 1930 (1 February – April) – In A.A. Milne's play "Michael and Mary", at the St. James's Theatre in London, with Herbert Marshall, Edna Best, Olwen Brookes, Elizabeth Allan and Frank Lawton in the cast.
- 1936 (October) – In the play "Plot Twenty-One", at the Embassy Repertory Theatre in London, with Molly Rankin, Avice Landone, Clare Greet, John Ruddock, and Jack Livesey in the cast. Rodney Ackland and Harold Clayton were directors.
- 1938 – In St. John Ervine's play "Robert's Wife", at the Globe Theatre in London, with Edith Evans, Owen Nares, and Robert Holmes in the cast. Murray Macdonald was director.
- 1949 – In Ronald Jeans play Young Wives' Tale, at the Savoy Theatre in London
- 1952 – In Jennette Dowling Letton's play "The Young Elizabeth", at the Criterion Theatre in London, with Mary Morris, Joseph O'Conor, Margaretta Scott, Peggy Thorpe-Bates, Godfrey Kenton, and Basil Dignam in the cast. Charles Hickman was director.

== Selected filmography ==
- And Then He Woke Up (1909) – as The Girl:
- Vengeance of the Air (1915) – as Enid Mortimer
- Arms and the Man (1932) – as Catherine Petkoff
- Double Alibi (1937) – as Mrs. Havilland
- Beauty and the Barge (1937) – as Mrs. Smedley
- Melody and Romance (1937) – as Mrs. Hawkins
- My Wife's Family (1941) – as Arabella Bagshott
- A Canterbury Tale (1944) – as Mrs. Colpeper
- Black Narcissus (1947) – as Clodagh's Grandmother (in flashback – uncredited)

== See also ==
- List of British actors
