= Alex Mitchell (Australian journalist) =

Australian journalist, columnist and writer

Alex Mitchell (born 9 March 1942) is an Australian journalist, columnist and writer. At The Sun-Herald, he served as Europe correspondent and later as state political editor during a 21-year career at the paper.

In 2011, he published his memoirs under the title Come the Revolution, described by critic Peter Craven as 'a great journalist's reflection of the colour and horror of history on the run.'

Dame Carmen Callil, the founder of the renowned feminist publishing house Virago Press, said of the book that 'Mitchell adds two special qualities to a fabulous life: a great heart and a magical pen.'

Mitchell began his career on the Townsville Daily Bulletin, the Mount Isa Mail and the Daily Mirror in Sydney and the Canberra Press Gallery. Arriving in London in 1967, he joined the Sunday Times investigative team, INSIGHT, investigating the Soviet master spy Kim Philby and the corporate fraudsters Bernie Cornfeld of IOS and Robert Maxwell of Pergamon Press.

In 1971, he joined Granada Television's World in Action as reporter. His film "The Man Who Stole Uganda" featured the first on-camera interview with Idi Amin by a Western journalist after the coup that Amin led in Uganda. He was also the reporter for the Granada Television film "The Rise and Fall of Jerome D Hoffman".

Mitchell left World in Action to become editor of the Trotskyist daily newspaper, Workers Press, later renamed The News Line, before returning to Sydney in 1986 to join the John Fairfax-owned The Sun-Herald. Between 1992 and 1994 he was Sun-Herald European correspondent based in London and later became State Political Editor and president of the NSW Parliamentary Press Gallery (2001–07).

On 6 January 1962 Mitchell married Livia Mathilde Heidecker of Charters Towers and they divorced two years later. They had no children. Mitchell is married to Judith White, former executive director of the NSW Art Gallery Society, and they have a son, Scott Donald Mitchell. From a previous relationship with Joy Pinnock he has two children, Laura Clare Mitchell and Lachlan James Mitchell.

In 2022 Mitchell published two further books: A Coup in Canberra (February), a reassessment of the stormy career of Prime Minister Sir John Gorton, and Mountbatten: Britain's Warlord (July).

Since leaving The Sun-Herald, he has been a contributor to the online current affairs site Crikey, the ABC site The Drum, and Pearls and Irritations and has written for Meanjin and Overland.

He continues to write a blog on his website cometherevolution.com.au

== Awards ==
In 1992, the Republican Party of Australia named Mitchell as its Australian Republican of the Year. National convenor of the party Peter Consandine said upon awarding the Mitchell, 'to be a Republican is to be a true patriot'. The award is based on the popular vote of the rank-and-file membership.

In 1997, he received two awards: Racing Writer of the Year presented by NSW Gaming and Racing Minister Richard Face and Journalist of the Year by Noel Bracks, president of the NSW Racehorse Owners Association.

In December 2020, he was awarded honorary lifetime membership of the Media Entertainment and Arts Alliance, the Australian trade union and professional organisation which covers the media, entertainment, sports and arts industries. Its citation recognised his 50-year career in the media and "the contribution made by him for the ideals and objectives" of the MEAA.

Media offices
Preceded by Michael Banda	Editor of Workers' Press; 1974 – 1980s	Succeeded by Paul Jennings
