= Workers International Vanguard Party =

Political party in South Africa

The Workers International Vanguard Party (WIVP; formerly the Workers International Vanguard League, WIVL) is a Trotskyist organisation in South Africa. It publishes Workers International News.

The group's origins lie in the underground Trotskyist Revolutionaries group, founded in 1985. In 1991, it became the South African section of the Workers International to Rebuild the Fourth International (WIRFI), and it finally became an open group when it stood candidates in the 1994 South African general election, winning 5,481 votes.

In 1996, after a dispute about the conclusions to be drawn from the break-up of the WIRFI, the vast majority of members left to form the WIVL. As the remainder of the South African WIRFI group soon dissolved, the WIVL claims to be the successor to this organisation. They stood in the 1999 South African general election, but came last, with only 672 votes.

The group were among the founders of the Anti-War Coalition, and are currently focusing on this activity.

In June 2009, the WIVL became founder members of the International Leninist-Trotskyist Fraction.
