= The News Line =

Trotskyist newspaper

- Type: Daily newspaper
- Format: Tabloid
- Owner: Workers' Revolutionary Party
- Founded: 1969 (as Workers' Press)
- Political alignment: Trotskyism
- Headquarters: BCM Box 747; London; WC1N 3XX
- OCLC number: 145398605
- Website: https://wrp.org.uk/

The News Line is a daily newspaper published by a British Trotskyist group, the Workers' Revolutionary Party.

== History ==
The paper was launched in 1969 as Workers Press and renamed News Line in 1976.

For a time during the 1980s, the WRP split into two rival factions, and for a short time there were two versions of The News Line being produced every day, one by each faction.

Chris Hughton wrote a football column for the newspaper in the 1970s.

== Editors ==
1969: Michael Banda
1974: Alex Mitchell
1980s: Paul Jennings

== See also ==
- Workers Revolutionary Party (Workers Press)
- List of left-wing publications in the United Kingdom
