= Economic and Philosophic Science Review =

British Marxist-Leninist newspaper

- Type: Fortnighly newspaper
- Format: A4
- Owner: EPSR Supporters
- Editor: Don Hoskins
- Founded: 1979
- Political alignment: Marxism–Leninism
- Headquarters: London
- Price: £0.25
- Website: EPSR website

The Economic and Philosophic Science Review (EPSR) is a British Marxist–Leninist newspaper founded by Royston Bull, formerly a leading member of the Workers Revolutionary Party and industrial correspondent for The Scotsman newspaper.

Bull split from the WRP in 1979 and with a number of supporters to form the Workers Party. The group, upon formally repudiating Trotskyism, renamed themselves the International Leninist Workers Party and later the Economic and Philosophic Science Review. Although Royston Bull died aged 69 on 2 January 2005, the EPSR continues to be published fortnightly, by its supporters.

== Policies ==
The ILWP/EPSR are avowedly Marxist-Leninist and supportive of the Soviet Union model but critical of its party's revisionism which they attribute to Joseph Stalin's political errors. They are also very strongly supportive of Sinn Féin (and until its dissolution, of the Irish Republican Army) and many Third World national liberation movements.

During the 1970s Eurocommunists outside the group (adopting ideology of the New Left) attempted to promote a panoply of LGBT rights on the far-left. This gathered steam such that by the 1990s it was mainstream policy among far-left publications; the EPSR rejected the stance in 1999 outright as anti-social, saying homosexuality had "obvious disadvantages for any species in evolutionary terms". John Pearson, a member of the revisionist Communist Party of Great Britain (Provisional Central Committee) in their Weekly Worker said this was homophobia.

== Relations to Socialist Labour Party ==
With the foundation of the Socialist Labour Party by the leader of the National Union of Mineworkers, Arthur Scargill in 1996, the EPSR dissolved itself into the SLP where they operated as a faction around their paper, the EPSR. Royston Bull was elected vice-president of the SLP in 1998, but was then almost immediately expelled (or 'voided') from party membership. Arthur Scargill, who had supported Bull's candidacy, used it to strengthen his position within the SLP. The election caused a significant rift within the SLP, with one member, Brian Heron, calling Bull's election "a disaster". Whilst some of Bull's supporters stayed within the SLP, most left to rejoin Bull and organised themselves as "EPSR supporters".
