= Redgrave family =

English acting dynasty

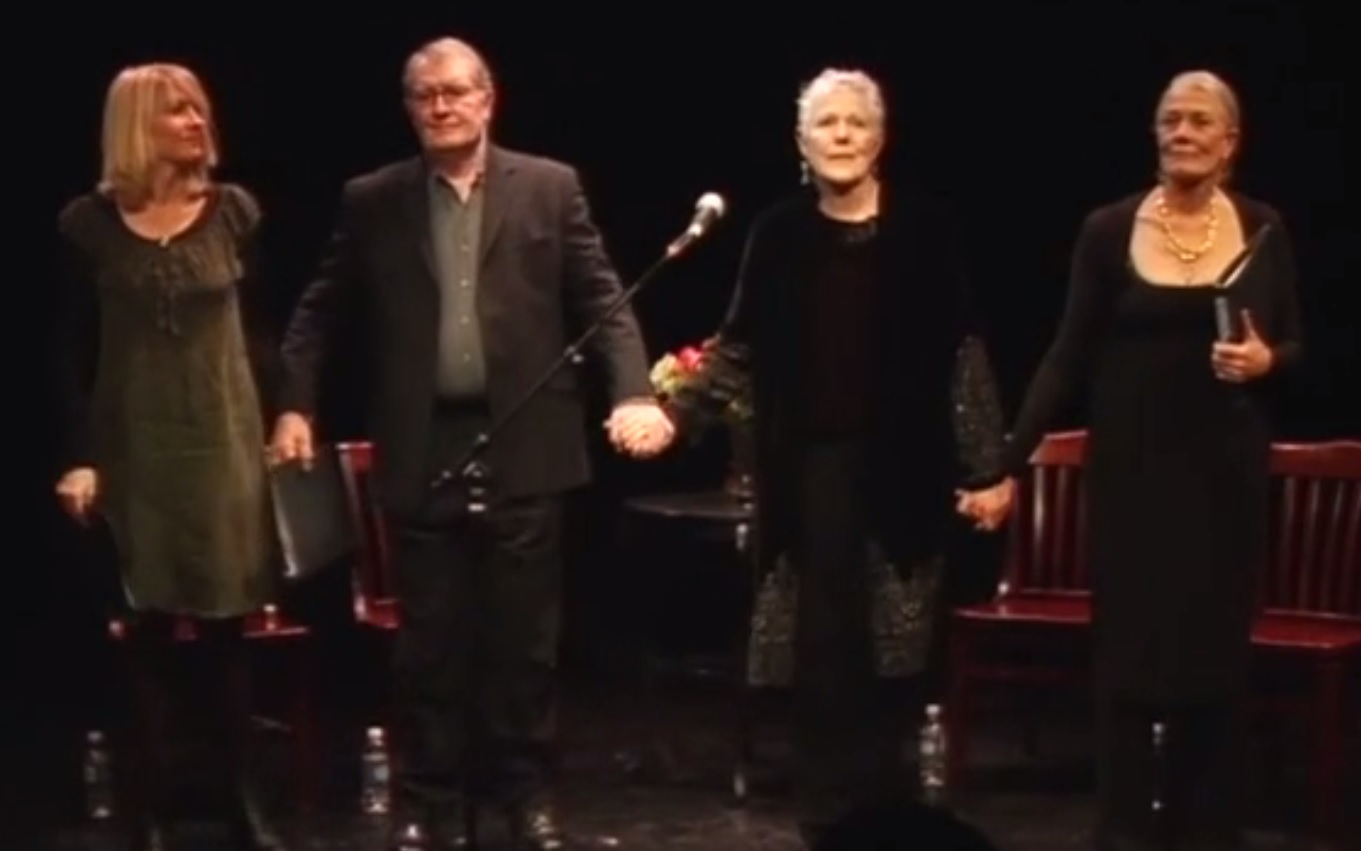
Left to right, Jemma, Corin, Lynn, and Vanessa Redgrave after reading Poems from Guantánamo at the Center for Constitutional Rights in 2007.

The Redgrave family is a British acting dynasty, spanning five generations. Members of the family worked in theatre beginning in the nineteenth century, and later in film and television. Some family members have also written plays and books. Vanessa Redgrave is the most prominent, having won Oscar, Tony, Golden Globe and Emmy awards.

== Family tree ==
The family tree below shows the notable members of family

=== Michael Redgrave (and ancestors) ===
Roy Redgrave (1873–1922)	Daisy Scudamore (1881–1958)
Michael Redgrave (1908–85)	Rachel Kempson (1910–2003)
Vanessa Redgrave (1937– )	Corin Redgrave (1939–2010)	Lynn Redgrave (1943–2010)

=== Vanessa Redgrave ===
Tony Richardson (1928–1991)	Vanessa Redgrave (1937– )	Franco Nero (1941– )
Liam Neeson (1952– )	Natasha Richardson (1963–2009)	Joely Richardson (1965– )	Tim Bevan (1958– )	Carlo Nero (1969– )	Jennifer Wiltsie (1965– )
Micheál Richardson (1995– )	Daisy Bevan (1992– )

=== Corin Redgrave ===
Deirdre Hamilton-Hill (1939–97)		Corin Redgrave (1939–2010)	Kika Markham (1940– )
Tim Owen	Jemma Redgrave (1965– )

=== Lynn Redgrave ===
Lynn Redgrave (1943–2010)	John Clark (1932–2023)

== Marriages ==
- Roy Redgrave and Daisy Scudamore (later changed to Margaret Scudamore): 1907 – 25 May 1922 (his death) – son Michael
- Michael Redgrave and Rachel Kempson: 20 July 1935 – 21 March 1985 (his death) – son Corin, daughters Vanessa and Lynn
- Vanessa Redgrave and (1) Tony Richardson: 1962–1967 (divorced) – daughters Natasha and Joely; (2) Franco Nero: 2006–present – son Carlo
- Corin Redgrave and (1) Deirdre Hamilton-Hill: 1962–1975 (divorced) – daughter Jemma, son Luke; (2) Kika Markham: 1985 – 6 April 2010 (his death) – sons Arden and Harvey
- Lynn Redgrave and John Clark: 2 April 1967 – 22 December 2000 (divorced) – son Benjamin, daughters Kelly and Annabel
- Natasha Richardson and Robert Fox: 1990–1992 (divorced); (2) Liam Neeson: 3 July 1994 – 18 March 2009 (her death) – sons Micheál and Daniel
- Joely Richardson and Tim Bevan: January 1992 – July 2001 (divorced) – daughter Daisy
- Jemma Redgrave and Tim Owen: 1992–2020 (divorced) – sons Gabriel and Alfie

== See also ==
- List of show business families
