= Gerry Healy =

Irish-British socialist activist (1913–1989)

Leader of the Marxist Party
- In office 1987–1989

Leader of the Workers' Revolutionary Party
- In office 1973–1985

Personal details
- Born: Thomas Gerard Healy; 3 December 1913 Ballybane, Galway, Ireland
- Died: 14 December 1989 (aged 76) St Thomas’ Hospital, London, England
- Party: Workers' Revolutionary Party
- Spouse: Ellen Knight

Thomas Gerard Healy (3 December 1913 – 14 December 1989) was an Irish-born British political activist, a co-founder of the International Committee of the Fourth International and the leader of the Socialist Labour League and later the Workers Revolutionary Party.

== Early career ==
Born in Ballybane, Galway, Ireland, to Michael Healy, a farmer, and Margaret Mary Rabbitte, Gerry Healy emigrated to Britain and worked as a ship radio operator at the age of 14. He soon joined the Communist Party of Great Britain, but then left to join the Trotskyist Militant Group in 1937. He then left to become one of the founders of the Workers International League, led by Ted Grant, Jock Haston and Ralph Lee.

Healy's period in the WIL was difficult and he threatened to resign several times and was actually expelled and readmitted. He was in the group when it fused with the Revolutionary Socialist League to form the Revolutionary Communist Party but grew closer to the leadership of the Fourth International, effectively the leadership of the American Socialist Workers Party, and their representative in Britain, Sam Gordon. They encouraged Healy to form a faction and to take that group into the Labour Party. In 1950, he was rewarded as the RCP voted to dissolve itself into his faction which became known as The Club.

In 1953, Healy joined the wing of the Fourth International led in part by James P. Cannon after the FI split into two competing wings. Healy's wing was the International Committee of the Fourth International of which he soon became a leader, along with James P. Cannon and Pierre Lambert, the leader of the French Section of the FI. The Club recruited a substantial number of former members of the Communist Party of Great Britain after they became disillusioned with Stalinism after the Twentieth Congress of the Soviet Communist Party in February 1956 which brought Khrushchev's revelations about Stalin and, later that year, the defeat of the Hungarian Revolution. This qualitatively changed the ability of Healy's group to carry out activity and they launched The Newsletter as a regular weekly paper in 1958. The creation of the Socialist Labour League was formally announced in February 1959, and proscribed by the Labour Party in late March that year, along with The Newsletter, rendering anyone associated with Healy's group ineligible for membership of the Labour Party. Later in the year. Healy was excluded from the Streatham Constituency Labour Party, by which time the local party had been suspended, and the neighbouring Norwood Labour Party was in the process of being re-organised because of the activities of SLL activists.

In 1966, Healy and the SLL were accused of thuggery after Ernie Tate was allegedly beaten and hospitalised by supporters of Healy while selling a pamphlet critical of him outside an SLL public meeting. Allegedly, Healy was present and "essentially supervised" the assault. The incident became a cause célèbre within the world Trotskyist movement. Healy's Socialist Labour League filed lawsuits against Peace News and Socialist Leader for repeating the allegations, threatening them with bankruptcy, prompting the two publications to issue retractions and a public apology to Gerry Healy “for having published the suggestion that he employs violence or seeks to curtail freedom of expression” on 9 and 10 December 1966 respectively., The incident resulted in Isaac Deutscher, who had previously been a contributor to Healy's publications, summoning both Healy and Tate to his home where he "upbraided" Healy for his alleged thuggery and broke off relations with him.

The SLL became the Workers' Revolutionary Party in 1973.

== Workers Revolutionary Party ==
In 1974, some 200 members around Alan Thornett, then a leading militant in the automobile industry at Cowley, were expelled from the party. Part of this group would form the Workers Socialist League. From this point, the WRP lost members and became ever more isolated from the rest of the labour movement. Healy was known to have punched members of the party's central committee while theoretical discussions were in progress.

However, the group remained sizeable and wealthy enough to produce a daily newspaper. Much of the money for the printing enterprise coming from subsidies and printing contracts with various Middle Eastern regimes as internal reports later proved. They supplemented their income by printing newspapers for leading figures of the Labour Left such as the Labour Herald for Ted Knight, a former member of the SLL, and Ken Livingstone, with whom Healy forged a friendship. The Herald also served as a vehicle for the WRP's limited entryist operation in this period. Healy's regime within The Club, SLL and WRP was marked by demands for a high level of activism. An exception to this requirement was made for participants in the cultural fronts the SLL set up to attract actors and writers, at least until they became full party members. This attracted prominent figures including Vanessa Redgrave and Frances de la Tour, although they "were resented by many members of the WRP who felt they had parachuted into leading positions because of their fame and money."

== Implosion of the WRP ==
In late October 1985, Healy was expelled from the WRP.

By then, concern as to Healy's financial, political and intelligence links with the Libyan and Iraqi governments had risen within the party to the point at which it imploded. The final straw was an allegation by Aileen Jennings, Healy's former secretary and "close personal companion" over 19 years, that Healy had sexually abused female members of the WRP. On the front page of Newsline, which re-appeared after 12 days' absence because of the internal dispute, Jennings wrote in an open letter that flats owned by the party were used in a "completely opportunist way for sexual liaisons" by Healy, who had used his status "to degrade women and girl comrades and destroy their self respect".

Healy described the allegations as a smokescreen for those who had become disappointed with revolutionary politics following the defeat of the miners' strike, although the involvement of the WRP in the strike was reportedly minimal. After Michael Banda, the general secretary of the party, publicly commented that Healy had likely sexually abused more than 26 women, Vanessa Redgrave said at a press conference that "these allegations are all lies and the women who are supposed to have made them are all liars. I don't care whether it's 26, 36 or 236. They are all liars". She denounced her former colleague: "This is part of a political frame-up by Mr Banda who wants to dissolve the WRP because he has moved to the right".

As a result of these developments, the WRP collapsed into eight or nine competing groupuscules. One such fragment produced a version of their daily paper headlined "Healy Expelled", while Healy's WRP produced a totally different version. Healy's WRP continued until what he saw as unconstitutional manoeuvres by the Torrance leadership led him to form another new group. Formed in 1987, the Marxist Party had very few members, but did retain the allegiance of Vanessa and Corin Redgrave. One faction within the WRP supported the perspective advanced by the ICFI and Workers League National Secretary David North who won the support of a majority of sections of the ICFI to expel the WRP from the organization, deciding that any supporters of theirs among the WRP would have to undergo a new application process to be readmitted. They formed the WRP (Internationalist), later renamed the International Communist Party and, in 1996, the Socialist Equality Party who argued that “the WRP tended to view the international organization as little more than an adjunct to its own British-based organization”.

Ken Livingstone, the Labour Party left-winger who later became Mayor of London, said he believed in 1994 that the split was the work of MI5. Party member and The News Line editor John Spencer rejected the idea, writing in The Guardian:

Livingstone apparently cannot accept that a majority of WRP members in 1985 felt their first loyalty was to the party. They felt that the female members of the party staff who were victims of Healy's callous and cynical mistreatment were entitled to support against him. It is scurrilous for Livingstone to insinuate a link between the WRP majority and the security service. If he believed what he claims he would submit the issue to the verdict of a labour movement jury as has been the practice of revolutionaries since the 19th century. Until he does, he should be treated as a witch-hunter.

Geoff Barr wrote in 1994:

The trouble is that the evidence of sexual exploitation by Healy is too strong. Those who play a role in socialist politics must not abuse their positions of power. Livingstone says that MI5 destroyed the old WRP because its close alliance with the Labour left during the miners strike of 1984–5 was a threat to the establishment. Those who were active then will tell a different story. Healy kept his movement out of the support committees which backed the NUM. His was a sectarian body, it offered little to the miners and it made minimal gains in the strike. It was no threat to anybody.

In his old age, Healy would claim that the disintegration of the WRP was due to the intervention of MI5. He also declared that Mikhail Gorbachev was leading the political revolution in the USSR. Healy died at the age of 76 from natural causes.

Healy has often been criticised for the WRP's internal regime, which did not allow members to challenge his ideas or policies. While enjoying a financially comfortable life himself, he allowed some of his most committed activists to live in poverty. John Lister, expelled from the WRP in 1974, concluded:

Healy was a crook and a political charlatan, who preserved his position as General Secretary of the WRP by resorting to the most bureaucratic and anti-democratic measures, who stubbornly opposed any campaigning for women's liberation or gay rights, who habitually subjected women "comrades" to sexual abuse, who sold out the WRP's formal principles and programme for Middle East oil money and who has done more than anyone to degrade the reputation of Marxism and Trotskyism in Britain.

Healy was depicted as "Frank Hood of the Hoodlums" in Tariq Ali's satire, Redemption (1990). The character John Tagg, played by Laurence Olivier in Trevor Griffiths' 1973 play at the National Theatre, The Party, was also based on Healy.

== Personal life ==
He married Betty Russell in December 1941: the couple had a daughter, Mary, and a son, Alan. He had affairs with Swiss-British Trotskyist Betty Hamilton and with his political secretary Aileen Jennings.

== See also ==
- Tony Cliff and Ted Grant – two other former RCP members who went on to found prominent rival Trotskyist parties

== Sources ==
- Christophe Le Dréau, "Repères pour une histoire du trotskisme britannique, 1925–2005", Communisme, 2006, 87, numéro spécial "Regards sur le communisme britannique", pp. 149–60.
