= Workers Revolutionary Party (UK) =

- General Secretary: Nash Campbell
- Founders: Gerry Healy; John Lawrence
- Founded: The Club (1947); Socialist Labour League (1959); Workers Revolutionary Party (1973)
- Split from: Revolutionary Communist Party
- Headquarters: BCM Box 747; London; WC1N 3XX
- Ideology: Orthodox Trotskyism; Trotskyism; Euroscepticism
- Political position: Far-left
- International affiliation: International Committee of the Fourth International

Website
- wrp.org.uk

The Workers Revolutionary Party (WRP) is a Trotskyist political party in Britain.

The group was originally a faction of Revolutionary Communist Party led by Gerry Healy, before splitting off in 1947 to form The Club. The Club existed until 1959 when it became the Socialist Labour League.

The Socialist Labour League would become a political party in 1973, renaming itself to the Workers Revolutionary Party.

In 1985, allegations of sexual assault against Gerry Healy led to the WRP splitting into several smaller groups, one of which retains possession of the name.

== History ==
=== The Club (1948-1959) ===
In 1948, a minority faction led by Gerry Healy split from the Revolutionary Communist Party to form The Club, which then joined the Labour Party.

Healy called for a massive educational effort within the organisation, which angered the old leadership. Though he met with opposition, Healy valued having a well-educated cadre over a large number of mindless followers. Healy set to work purging the group of real and imagined opponents with the result that within months the organisation was a fraction of its former size, but Healy's leadership was unchallenged.

The Club joined with Labour left-wingers to organise The Socialist Fellowship as a vehicle for left-wing Labour Party members and launched the Socialist Outlook. In 1950, Ted Grant and his supporters were expelled from The Club, forming their own marxist tendency. Tony Cliff and his supporters were also expelled from the group during this time, due to Cliff's position of remaining neutral in the Korean War, forming the Socialist Review Group.

A split emerged within The Club in September 1953, relating to the Fourth International. While Healy was associated with the US SWP and the ICFI, John Lawrence supported the ISFI and controlled both Socialist Outlook and its print shop. Healy wrested control of both, and his supporters held a majority on the organisation's national committee.

The International Committee of the Fourth International (ICFI) recognised The Club as its official British section. The Club was one of the ICFI's larger segments. After the American, Austrian, Chinese, Latin American and Swiss parties of the ICFI agreed to reunification with the FI in 1963 (forming the reunified Fourth International), The Club controlled the ICFI until its fragmentation in 1985.

The group gained recruits from among former members of the Communist Party of Great Britain. One of their recruits from the CPGB was Peter Fryer, who had been the Daily Worker's correspondent in Budapest during the suppression of the uprising by Soviet troops, and who edited The Newsletter, a weekly which began publication in May 1958. This paper published some of Trotsky's then hard-to-find books. Among other recruits at this time were Cliff Slaughter and Brian Pearce. Coupled with pressure from a group around industrial activist Brian Behan led to the formation of the Socialist Labour League.

The Club had hoped to become the leaders of the Labour Left, however their position on the Korean War lost them all support in Parliament and led to the Socialist Fellowship being banned by the Labour National Executive Committee in 1951.

=== Socialist Labour League (1959-1973) ===
In 1959, the Club became the Socialist Labour League. For the first time, the Socialist Labour League was openly Trotskyist, although most of its members remained active in the Labour Party. In 1959, the at the end of February 1959, Membership was "open to all who want to see the vigorous prosecution of the class struggle and the achievement of working class power".

The group's Newsletter, and the SLL itself, were proscribed by the Labour Party in late March 1959, which meant that anyone associated with Healy's group became ineligible for membership of the Labour Party. Morgan Phillips, then general secretary of the Labour Party, addressed the issue of SLL entryism. "The principal group is so well disciplined and financed that it is slowly emerging as a serious nuisance to the democratic Socialism which it outwardly accepts and covertly derides", he wrote in an April 1959 letter to the secretaries of Constituency Labour Parties and affiliated trade unions. By August, 23 people associated with the SLL in the Norwood Constituency Labour Party and eight councilors in Leeds, among others, had been expelled by Labour. As a result of the activities of the SLL activists in Norwood, the local Labour Party branch was re-organised later in the year. Meanwhile, J.R. Campbell, by then the former editor of the Daily Worker, wrote in the Communist weekly World News in October 1959 that the SLL was an "anti-Soviet league" and "a disruptive, Trotskyist organisation", who were in favour of the overthrow of the Soviet government by an unaffiliated working class inside and outside the Soviet Union.

During this period, the SLL did experience considerable internal tensions. Fryer left in 1959 and in 1960 a group of members split away to form Solidarity, which became a theoretically influential, industrially oriented organization strongly influenced by the ideas of Paul Cardan. Brian Behan also severed his involvement with the group after a confrontation with Gerry Healy.

The SLL remained active in the Labour Party's youth organization, the Young Socialists, and gained control of it until the YS was wound up in 1964. The SLL used the YS as their own youth section. It was run through the "centre" in Clapham, the SLL's HQ, in a doctrinaire and almost militaristic fashion. The Annual Conferences of the YS were stage managed by the Healyites. The Labour Party renamed the youth section the "Labour Party Young Socialists" (LPYS).

The SLL leadership claimed in 1963 that they had identified a revolutionary situation in Britain. In their view this meant the most important activity was building the party. They started a daily paper, Workers Press, in the early 1970s and increased the turnover of membership, and began to fear police infiltration. Internal and external dissidents were dealt with harshly. One incident saw Ernie Tate, a Canadian Trotskyist, attacked in public while distributing anti-Healy leaflets. The advocacy of an increasing state of crisis would become a prominent part of their public profile.

In 1968, the SLL formed the All-Trade Unions Alliance. Among its policies was the immediate replacement of the police by a workers militia. The party slowly lost members from the mid-1970s as demands on members to serve the organisation took their toll, although by now Corin and Vanessa Redgrave had joined.

In order to "kill the bill" which became the Industrial Relations Act 1971, the SLL called for a general strike to force the government of Edward Heath to call a general election. While a SLL-organised meeting at the Alexandra Palace, London in February 1971 had an attendance of 4,000, the SLL and the other Trotskyist groups had a very limited industrial presence incapable of organising such a level of protest, according to a contemporary report by Paul Routledge in The Times.

=== Workers Revolutionary Party 1973- ===
In 1973, the SLL became a political party, renaming itself to the Workers Revolutionary Party.

A major split occurred when Alan Thornett was expelled, and went on to found the Workers Socialist League. In 1979, a smaller group split from the WRP to found the Workers Party.

In 1975, Corin Redgrave bought the White Meadows Villa in Parwich, Derbyshire, and the WRP used the house as a venue for training, under the name 'Red House', run by television director Roy Battersby. The Observer printed a report alleging that actress Irene Gorst was interrogated while at the school and prevented from leaving. The group sued Observer editor David Astor over the report, in a case marked by discussion of an armed police raid of the building in which bullets were found. The jury found that not all words in the article were substantially true, but that the complainants' reputations had not been materially injured.

In 1976, the WRP launched an inquiry into the details of Trotsky's death, following claims from Joseph Hansen that Harold Robins, a founding member of the American Socialist Workers Party might have been a Soviet agent. The eventual report exonerated Robins and claimed that Ramón Mercader was alive in Czechoslovakia. In 1979, the group purchased Trotsky's death mask to use as an iconic focus for events.

The WRP met with Libyan officials in 1977 and issued a joint statement, opposing Zionism, U.S. imperialism and Anwar Sadat. There were immediate suggestions that this statement might be linked to Libyan funding for the party's newspaper, News Line. Close links continued, with party members regularly speaking at official events in Libya. In 1981, The Sunday Telegraph alleged that News Line was financed by money from Muammar al-Gaddafi's government, which the WRP denied.

On 20 March 1983, The Money Programme made similar claims and claimed that the WRP had received £1.5 million from the Gaddafi government. Sean Matgamna wrote in the Socialist Organiser newspaper that while the programming was "both shallow and under-researched", the WRP should be investigated by the labour movement to determine if the WRP was being funded by the Libyan government or others like Saddam Hussein.

When, a little later, the WRP disintegrated, an investigation was carried out by the leadership of the ICFI, with the support of Mike Banda and Cliff Slaughter, leading figures in the WRP. The report concluded that the WRP had collected information for Libyan Intelligence. As printed by Solidarity, the report claimed £1,075,163 had been received by the group from Libya and several Middle Eastern governments, between 1977 and 1983. While only a small proportion of this is alleged to have come from Saddam Hussein's Iraqi government, it draws particular attention to photographs which it claims WRP members were instructed to take of demonstrations of opponents of Saddam Hussein, and it states that those photos were later handed to the Iraqi embassy. Dave Bruce, who oversaw the printing press, claims that income from Libya mostly covered the cost of raw materials for printing work for them, including copies of The Green Book, and that the party could otherwise cover its own costs.

The group also set up youth training centers in various deprived communities across Britain. Liberal Party MP David Alton claimed in Parliament that youths were being taught anti-police methods at the centres, and when he repeated the allegations outside Parliament was sued by the WRP.

At the meeting of the 7th WRP Congress, held in December 1984, the WRP stated the situation as pre-revolutionary, but warned that the Thatcher government (characterised as a Bonapartist dictatorship) could become a military dictatorship. The 1984–1985 miners' strike massively hurt the party's membership due to lack of expected results.

==== Expulsion of Gerry Healy ====
Allegations against Gerry Healy were first revealed in a letter to the WRP's Political Committee on 1 July 1985, where his secretary Aileen Jennings said that Healy had used a flat in Clapham to sexually assault 26 women over a period of over 20 years, of which she had been a victim. The committee voted 14 to 3 in rejecting the contents of the letter. These allegations were later confirmed. Healy had promised in a letter signed July 8, to: "cease immediately my personal conduct with the youth," however another person was reported as entering Healy's Clapham flat after this letter. This led to Healy being forced into retirement on 6 September and thrown out of the party offices.

On 24 October, the Workers Revolutionary Party expelled Gerry Healy. Initially, Healy was accused of "'violating the comrades' constitutional rights' and establishing 'non-communist relations". A party congress held on 27 October consisting of 12 central committee members including Vanessa Redgrave and Corin Redgrave had Healy reinstated and created a splinter party headquartered in north London.

On 29 October, General secretary Michael Banda mentioned Healy's expulsion as being because of his sexual assaults. On 30 October, Jennings' letter was published on the front page of Newsline and asserted that the real reason for the expulsion related to Healy's sexual assaults. The allegations were denied by people including the Redgraves, along with former News Line editor Alex Mitchell

The Redgraves and 10 members were expelled on 4 November 1985 for their support of Healy. The Healy supporters responded by expelling Banda from their own splinter group. This was conducted by two long-standing members of the WRP, one of whom later published the control commission report in his memoirs. The leadership were divided on the issue, with one group led by Cliff Slaughter pushing for his expulsion while the other group including Vanessa Redgrave, Corin Redgrave, and Ken Livingstone dismissed the allegations as provocations by MI5.

On 1 November, Banda and the WRP held a press conference and alleged that Healy may have committed assaults against more than 26 women, and that a committee was being established to ascertain how Healy was able to get away with assaults over a period of over 20 years. Banda also claimed to have affidavits from the 26 women initially mentioned.

Vanessa Redgrave also held a press conference on 4 November where Redgrave denied the allegations, saying: "These allegations are all lies and the women who are supposed to have made them are all liars. I don't care whether it's 26, 36 or 236. They are all liars." and accused Banda of shifting rightwards and wishing to dissolve the WRP. Both Corin and Vanessa Redgrave also claimed that Healy's letter written in July, which had been published in News Line, was fake.

The controversy created a split in the organisation, with two separate News Lines and the two separate headquarters, due to the Healy supporters moving to a separate space in North London

Corin Redgrave later accused Jennings, among others, of wrecking the party's finances on purpose, and keeping it covered up.

Banda was the leader of the majority on the party council, and was accused by Healy and Vanessa Redgrave of "unprincipled and unsupportable" deviation from the Trotskyist road to Socialism.

Banda was deposed and replaced by Cliff Slaughter after the controversy.

== Ideology and Organisation ==
The WRP is an Orthodox Trotskyist party, and the position of Gerry Healy was similar to Trotsky, as he also believed that the world was going through "impending economic collapse, the erosion of parliamentary democracy, a drive towards right-wing dictatorship, and imminent revolutionary struggles".

The party holds the position of being the definitive revolutionary party, and the SLL also held this position. This has led to non-cooperation with other Trotskyist groups, and believes that they have deviated from Trotskyism. The WRP denounced various groups including the SWP, the IMG, Militant tendency and Alan Thornett's group who were expelled from the WRP in 1974.

== Fragmentation and Legacy ==
In 1986, the ICFI loyal to Healy expelled the WRP (Newsline) faction. Healy was removed from the group's Central Committee and became an advisor. When the organisation printed an article reviewing Healy's contribution to Trotskyism, he concluded that his forced retirement was being finalised.

In 1987, Healy, Corin Redgrave, and Vanessa Redgrave resigned to form the Marxist Party. The Marxist Party in turn experienced another small split after Healy's death which formed the Communist League. The Marxist Party continued until 2004 before dissolving itself with Vanessa and Corin Redgrave forming the Peace and Progress Party.

Torrance's WRP is the only surviving Workers Revolutionary Party in the UK and still produces The News Line as a daily paper, and it is also included in a website. The party has been registered with the Electoral Commission since 15 May 2001, with Frank Sweeney as registered leader. As of 2007, the WRP had assets of just over £4,000. It remains electorally active and stood seven candidates for the 2015 UK General Election, six in London and one in Sheffield, gaining a total of 488 votes. It supported Brexit in the 2016 referendum. In 2019, the WRP announced their intention to stand six candidates in the 2019 United Kingdom general election.

== Election results ==
=== House of Commons ===
WRP endorsed Labour in constituencies they were not contesting in the 2019 and 2024 general elections.

House of Commons of the United Kingdom
Election year	#of Candidates	# of total votes	Average votes per candidate	# of seats won
Feb 1974	9	4,191	466	0
Oct 1974	10	3,404 ▼	340	0
1979	59	13,304 ▲	225	0
1983	21	3,798 ▼	181	0
1987	10	1,721 ▼	172	0
1992	2	330 ▼	165	0
1997	9	1,178 ▲	131	0
2001	6	607 ▼	101	0
2005	10	1,241 ▲	124	0
2010	7	738 ▼	105	0
2015	7	488 ▼	70	0
2017	5	771 ▲	154	0
2019	5	524 ▼	105	0
2024	5	1,190 ▲	238	0

== List of Splinter Groups ==
- Solidarity (1960).
- Workers Socialist League (1974), later the International Socialist Group and currently Socialist Resistance.
- Workers Party (1979), currently 'Economic and Philosophic Science Review Supporters'.
- WRP (Workers Press) (1985), later the Movement for Socialism. Dissolved in 2000.
- Workers' International League (1985), later 'Workers Action'. Dissolved in 2006.
- International Communist Party (1986), currently the Socialist Equality Party.
- Communist Forum (1986), split from WRP (Workers Press); later the 'Marxist Philosophy Forum'. Dissolved in 1988.
- Marxist Party (1987). Dissolved in 2004.
- International Socialist League (1988), split from WRP (Workers Press).
- Revolutionary Internationalist League (1988), dissolved in 1995.
- Communist League (1991), split from Marxist Party; later the 'Movement for a Socialist Future' and now "A World to Win".
- Socialist Fight (2009)
