= Michael Banda =

Sri Lankan trotskyist (1930–2014)

- Born: Michael Alexander Van Der Poorten; 1930; British Ceylon
- Died: 29 August 2014 (aged 83–84); United Kingdom
- Political party: BLPI (until 1950); The Club (c. 1953–59); SLL (1959–73); WRP (1973–85); WRP (WP) (1985–86)
- Other political affiliations: Marxist Philosophy Forum (1986–87)
- Movement: Trotskyism
- Opponent: Gerry Healy

Michael Banda (1930 – 29 August 2014), born Michael Alexander Van Der Poorten, was a Sri Lankan communist activist best known as the General Secretary of the British Workers Revolutionary Party.

== Early life and relocation to the UK ==
Born in Sri Lanka, Banda attended Trinity College, Kandy, alongside his brother, Tony. The two were convinced by teacher Hilary Abeyaratne to join the Bolshevik–Leninist Party of India, Ceylon and Burma, a Trotskyist organisation affiliated to the Fourth International. In 1950, the party merged into the Lanka Sama Samaja Party (LSSP), and around this time, the Banda brothers left Sri Lanka. They spent a couple of years in Yugoslavia, the Fourth International at the time being supportive of Josip Broz Tito's regime. They then emigrated to Britain, where they joined the British affiliate of the Fourth International, The Club, which was led by Gerry Healy.

== Rise to prominence ==
The Club underwent a major split in 1953, leaving the Fourth International, and Banda was a leading supporter of the majority around Healy. In particular, Banda attacked Michel Pablo, a leading figure in the international, for becoming critical of Tito.

The Banda brothers played a leading role in the design and printing of the group's publications, and remained leading figures as it transformed into the Socialist Labour League. In 1969, they co-ordinated the launch of a daily newspaper, the Workers' Press, and Mike Banda became its first editor.

In 1973, the party was again renamed, becoming the Workers' Revolutionary Party (WRP). Banda supported the Chinese Cultural Revolution and won the group to his position. He succeeded Healy as the WRP's general secretary in 1978, although Healy remained the party's most prominent and influential figure. At the 1979 general election, Banda stood for the party in Newham North East under his birth name, but took only 0.4% of the vote.

== Split in the WRP ==
The WRP underwent a major split in 1985, with Healy's secretary alleging that he had sexually assaulted a large number of female members. Banda expelled Healy from the party in October. However, Vanessa Redgrave, a WRP member supportive of Healy, argued that the allegations were false, and that the expulsion was "...part of a political frame-up by Mr Banda who wants to dissolve the WRP because he has moved to the right".

Healy and his supporters continued to claim they were the WRP, and Banda's group became known as the Workers Revolutionary Party (Workers Press) in order to differentiate the two. Banda wrote "27 Reasons Why the International Committee Should Be Buried Forthwith and the Fourth International Built", arguing that the International Committee of the Fourth International (ICFI) of which the WRP was the leading member, should be dissolved. This did not occur, but led the Workers Press group to split from the ICFI, and a group of ICFI supporters in the group to leave and found what became the Socialist Equality Party.

== Marxist Philosophy Forum ==
The Communist Forum was a short-lived political group formed in 1986 by Mike Banda, following his expulsion from the Workers Revolutionary Party (Workers Press). Banda continued to reassess his politics, and in 1986 published "What is Trotskyism? Or Will the Real Trotsky Please Stand Up?", a document arguing that Trotsky and the Trotskyist movement were mistaken. This position differed from the majority of the Workers' Press group, and so Banda left that year to form the Communist Forum. The group moved away from orthodox Trotskyism. This was soon renamed the "Marxist Philosophy Forum", but dissolved in 1987.

== After the splits ==
Banda moved temporarily back to Sri Lanka, where he discussed politics with Colvin R. de Silva of the LSSP.

On returning to Britain, Banda devoted his time to campaigning for the Kurdish community, forming the Kurdistan Solidarity Committee and Peace in Kurdistan Campaign. He died in 2014, after suffering from increasingly poor health.

Media offices
Preceded by New position	Editor of Workers' Press; 1969 – 1974	Succeeded by Alex Mitchell
Party political offices
Preceded by Gerry Healy	General Secretary of the Workers' Revolutionary Party; 1978 – 1985	Succeeded by Party split
