= Corin Redgrave =

English actor (1939–2010)

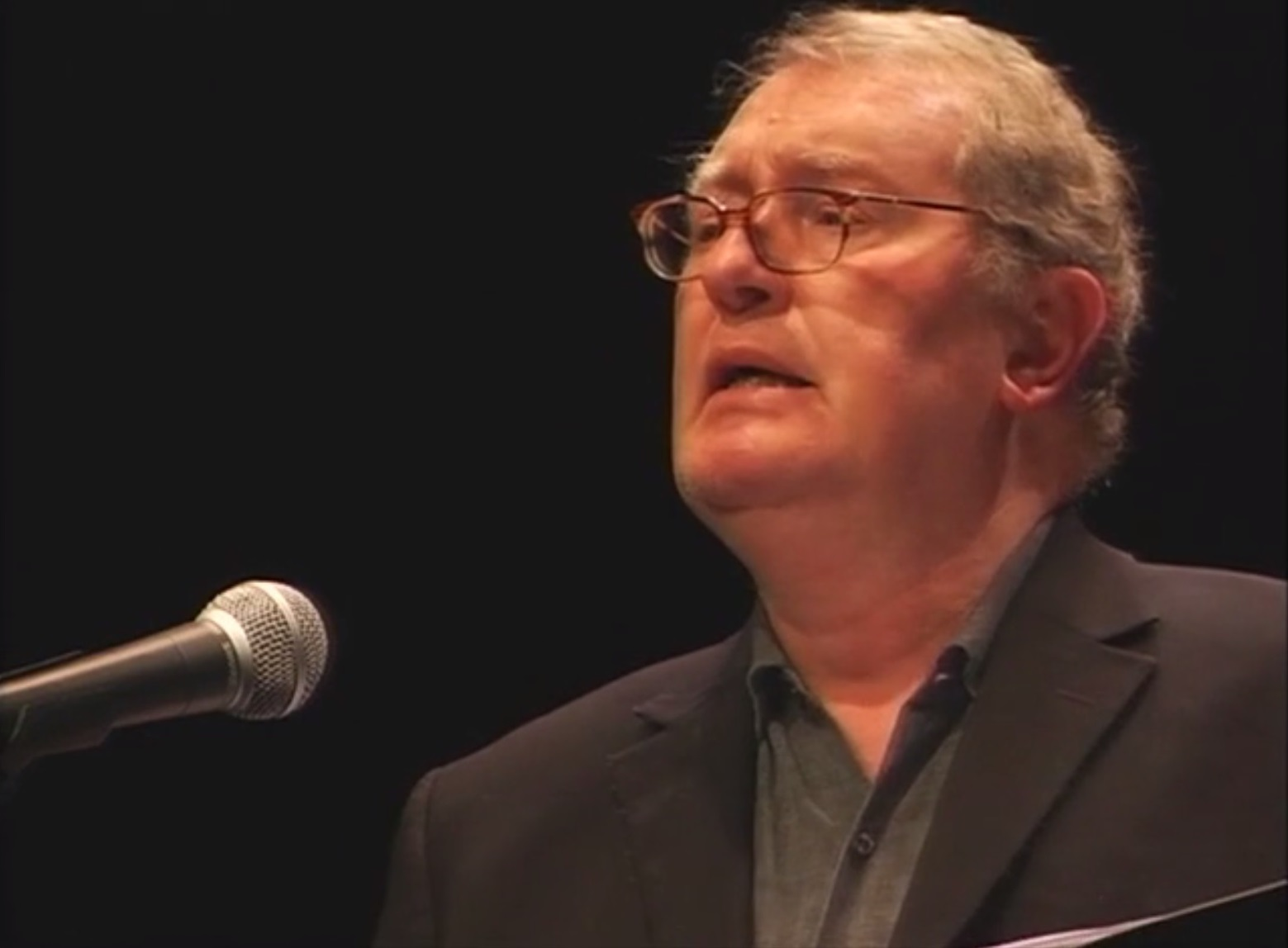
- Redgrave reading Poems from Guantánamo at the Center for Constitutional Rights in 2007
- Born: 16 July 1939; Marylebone, London, England
- Died: 6 April 2010 (aged 70); Tooting, London, England
- Resting place: Highgate Cemetery
- Education: King's College, Cambridge
- Occupations: Actor, political activist
- Years active: 1964–2010
- Spouses: Deirdre Hamilton-Hill (m. 1962; div. 1975) Kika Markham (m. 1985)
- Children: 4, including Jemma
- Parents: Michael Redgrave; Rachel Kempson
- Family: Redgrave

Corin William Redgrave (16 July 1939 – 6 April 2010) was an English actor. He was also a left-wing activist, co-founding the Marxist Party with his sister Vanessa Redgrave.

== Early life ==
Redgrave was born in Marylebone, London, the only son and middle child of actors Michael Redgrave and Rachel Kempson. He was educated at Westminster School and King's College, Cambridge.

== Career ==
Redgrave played a wide range of character roles on film, television and stage.

On stage, he was known for performances of Shakespeare (such as Much Ado About Nothing, Henry IV, Part 1, Antony and Cleopatra, and The Tempest) and Noël Coward (a highly successful revival of A Song At Twilight co-starring his sister Vanessa Redgrave and his second wife, Kika Markham).

For his role as the prison warden Boss Whalen in the Royal National Theatre production of Tennessee Williams's Not About Nightingales, Redgrave was nominated for an Evening Standard Award, and after a successful transfer of the production to New York, he received a Tony Award nomination for Best Actor in a Play, in 1999. Two years later he starred in the original London production of The General from America as Benedict Arnold. When the play transferred to Broadway the following season Redgrave switched roles and portrayed George Washington.

In 2005, Redgrave had just finished an engagement playing the lead in King Lear with the Royal Shakespeare Company in London when he suffered a severe heart attack. In 2008, he returned to the stage in a highly praised portrayal of Oscar Wilde in the one-man-play De Profundis. In 2009, he starred in Trumbo, which opened only hours after the death of his niece, Natasha Richardson.

On screen, he was cast in such films as A Man for All Seasons (1966) as Thomas More's son-in-law, William Roper; the highly praised Australian "flop" Between Wars (1974) as a renegade psychiatrist; Excalibur (1981) as the doomed Cornwall; In the Name of the Father (1993) as the corrupt lead police investigator; Persuasion (TV, 1995) as the foolish Sir Walter Eliot; and Four Weddings and a Funeral (1994) as Hamish, the fiancé and sometime husband of Andie MacDowell's character.

Redgrave appeared in British television programmes such as Ultraviolet, The Vice, Trial & Retribution, Shameless, Foyle's War, The Relief of Belsen, The Ice House and the Emmy Award-winning telefilm The Girl in the Cafe, in which he played the prime minister. He took the lead part of Sir George Grey in the New Zealand TV miniseries The Governor (1977).

He wrote a play called Blunt Speaking, in which he performed at the Minerva Theatre (a second stage of the Chichester Festival Theatre) between 23 July - 10 August 2002.

== Politics ==
Redgrave was a lifelong activist in left-wing politics. With his elder sister Vanessa, he was a prominent member of the Workers' Revolutionary Party. After the WRP's collapse, he was involved with the Marxist Party, which the two siblings founded.

Redgrave and his second wife, Kika Markham, expressed support for activist group Viva Palestina, led by British MP George Galloway, attempting to break the blockade of the Gaza Strip. He was also a defender of the interests of the Romani people.

== Family ==
Redgrave was part of the third generation of a theatrical dynasty spanning four generations. His parents were Sir Michael Redgrave and Rachel Kempson; Vanessa and Lynn Redgrave were his sisters. His first marriage was to Deirdre Deline Hamilton-Hill (1939–1997). They had a daughter, actress Jemma Redgrave, and a son. Redgrave and Hamilton-Hill divorced in 1975. Redgrave and Kika Markham married in 1985 in Wandsworth, London, and remained together until Redgrave's death. The couple had two sons.

He wrote a memoir about his strained relationship with his father, Michael Redgrave - My Father, which incorporates passages from Michael's diaries. It also reveals his father's bisexuality.

== Health problems and death ==
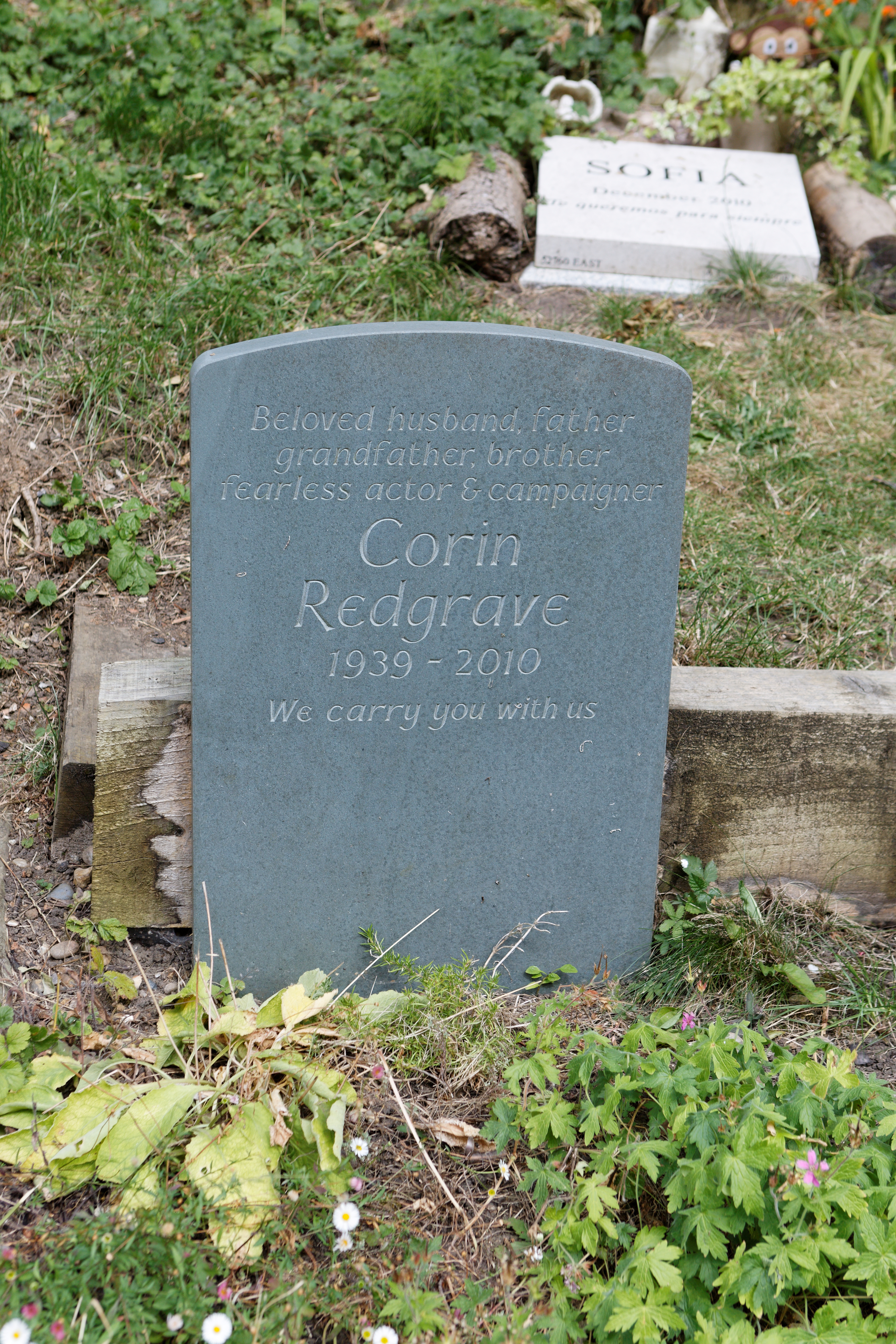
The grave of Corin Redgrave in Highgate Cemetery

Redgrave was diagnosed with prostate cancer in 2000, which continued to affect him until he died in 2010. In June 2005, his family said he was in critical but stable condition in hospital following a severe heart attack at a public meeting in Basildon, Essex. In March 2009, Redgrave returned to the London stage playing the title role in Trumbo, based on the life of the blacklisted Hollywood screenwriter Dalton Trumbo. On the opening night, Redgrave dedicated his performance to the memory of his niece Natasha Richardson, who had died earlier that week in a skiing accident.

He died on 6 April 2010 in St George's Hospital, Tooting, south London. His funeral was held on 12 April 2010 at St Paul's, Covent Garden, London, and he was interred on the eastern side of Highgate Cemetery.

His sister Lynn Redgrave died of breast cancer on 2 May 2010, less than a month after her brother. Markham's memoir of her husband, Our Time of Day: My Life with Corin Redgrave, was published in 2014.

== Select stage work ==
- Henry IV Part I
- Anthony and Cleopatra
- The Seagull
- Not About Nightingales
- A Song at Twilight
- The General From America
- De Profundis
- Trumbo
- The Norman Conquests

== Filmography ==
Year	Title	Role	Notes
1964	Camera Three	Pilot Officer	TV series (1 episode: "Chips with Everything")
1964	The Avengers	Quentin Slim	TV series (1 episode: "Lobster Quadrille")
1964	Crooks in Cloisters	Brother Lucius	
1965	A Study in Terror	Rupert's Friend	Uncredited
1965	The Big Spender	Copley	TV series
1966	A Man For All Seasons	Roper	
1967	The Deadly Affair	Terry	
1968	The Gambler	Mr. Astley	TV mini-series (1 episode: "Episode No. 1.1")
1968	The Charge of the Light Brigade	Cpt. Featherstonhaugh	
1968	Theatre 625	Kelvin Walker	TV series (1 episode: "The Fall of Kelvin Walker")
1968	The Girl with the Pistol	Frank Hogan	
1968	Mystery and Imagination	Jonathan Harker	TV series (1 episode: "Dracula")
1968	The Magus	Captain Wimmel	
1969	The Tenant of Wildfell Hall	Arthur Huntingdon	TV series (3 episodes)
1969	Oh! What a Lovely War	Bertie Smith	
1969	Tower of London: The Innocent	Perkin Warbeck	TV film
1969	Canterbury Tales	Nicholas	TV series (1 episode: "Episode No. 1.2")
1969	ITV Sunday Night Theatre	Willie Tatham	TV series (1 episode: "Aren't We All?")
1970	David Copperfield	James Steerforth	TV film
1970	The Wednesday Play	Richard	TV series (1 episode: "Rest in Peace, Uncle Fred")
1970	Callan	Amos Green	TV series (1 episode: "Amos Green Must Live")
1970	Paul Temple	Rolf	TV series (2 episodes)
1971	When Eight Bells Toll	Hunslett	
1971	Von Richthofen and Brown	Major Lanoe Hawker VC	
1971	La vacanza	Gigi	
1971	Hassan		TV film
1972	Thick as Thieves	Trevor	TV film
1974	Anthony and Cleopatra	Octavius	
1974	Between Wars	Dr. Edward Trenbow	
1976	Sérail	Eric Sange	
1976	The Governor	Governor George Grey	New Zealand mini-series
1981	Excalibur	Cornwall	
1982	L'ombre sur la plage	Harry	
1983	Eureka	Worsley	
1983	Wagner	Dr. Pusinelli	TV series (1 episode: "Episode No. 1.1")
1990	The Fool	Sir Thomas Neathouse	
1993	In The Name of The Father	Robert Dixon	
1994	Four Weddings and a Funeral	Hamish	
1995	Persuasion	Sir Walter Eliot	
1995	Performance	Angelo / Earl of Worcestor	TV series (2 episodes)
1995	Dangerfield	Patrick Hooper	TV series (1 episode: "The Unfaithful Husband")
1995	Circles of Deceit: Dark Secret	Harry Summers	TV film
1995	England, My England	William of Orange	
1996	Indecent Acts	Oscar Wilde	
1997	The Woman in White	Dr. Kitson	TV film
1997	The Ice House (novel)	D.C.I. George Walsh	TV film
1997	Prime Suspects	Commissioner	
1997	Trial & Retribution	Robert Rylands QC	TV series (5 episodes: 1997–2002)
1997	The Opium War	William Lamb, 2nd Viscount Melbourne	
1998	Ultraviolet	Dr. Paul Hoyle / John Doe	TV series (2 episodes)
1999	The Vice	Lord Buller	TV series (2 episodes)
1999	Kavanagh QC	John Woodley	TV series (1 episode: "The More Loving One")
1999	The Strange Case of Delphina Potocka or The Mystery of Chopin	Judge	
2000	Honest	Duggie Ord	
2000	Escape to Life: The Erika and Klaus Mann Story	Narrator	
2001	Enigma	Admiral Trowbridge	
2001	Gypsy Woman	Devine	
2002	Shackleton	Lord Curzon	TV film
2002	Sunday	Edward Heath	TV film
2002	Bertie and Elizabeth	General Montgomery	TV film
2002	The Forsyte Saga	Jolyon Forsyte Sr.	TV mini-series (4 episodes)
2002	Close Your Eyes	Chief Inspector Clements	
2002	Waking the Dead	Sir James Beatty	TV series (2 episodes)
2003	To Kill a King	Baron Vere	
2003	Imagine	Sir John Soane	TV series (1 episode: "Entertaining Mr. Soane")
2003	Foyle's War	ACC Rose	TV series (2 episodes)
2004	Shameless	Mr. Hammersley	TV series (1 episode: "Episode No. 1.5")
2004	Enduring Love	Professor	
2004	Spooks	David Swift	TV series (1 episode: "Episode No. 3.4")
2005	The Trial of the King Killers	Sir Orlando Bridgman	
2005	The Girl in the Cafe	Prime Minister	TV film
2006	Welcome to World War One		short
2007	The Relief of Belsen	Glyn Hughes	TV film
2008	La rabbia	Producer 1	
2009	The Calling	The Bishop	
2009	Glorious 39	Oliver	
2009	The Turn of the Screw	Professor	TV film
2010	Eva		
2010	Moving On	Gabe	TV series (1 episode: "The Test") (final appearance)

== See also ==
- List of British actors
