= Todd Boekelheide =

American film composer

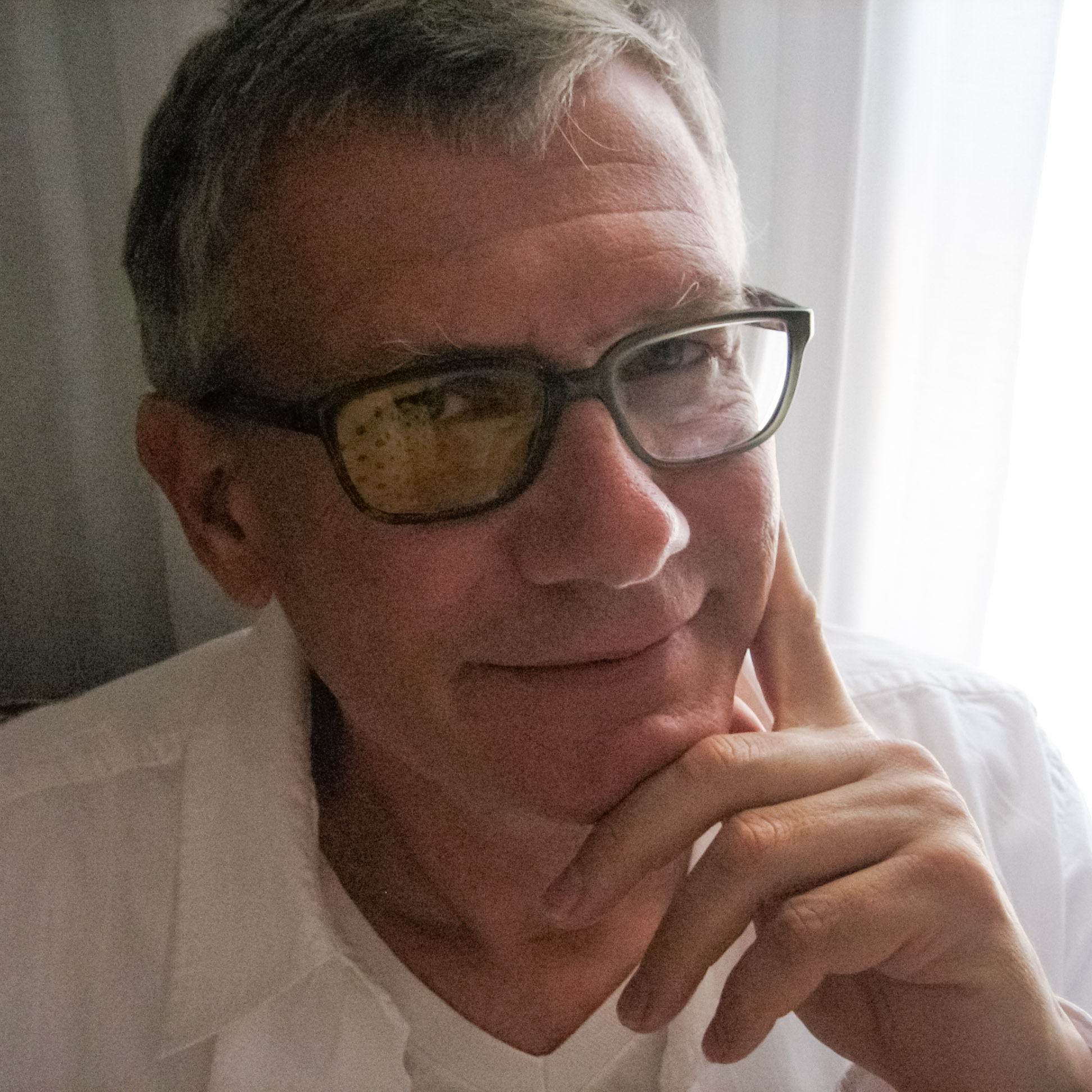
- Born: June 27, 1954 (age 71); Chico, California
- Occupation: Film Composer
- Years active: 1985 – present
- Family: Jay Boekelheide (brother)

Todd Boekelheide (born June 27, 1954) is an American composer based in the San Francisco Bay Area, best known for his work scoring documentary films. He won an Academy Award for Best Sound (Amadeus, 1984) and was nominated for another in the same category (Never Cry Wolf, 1983).

== Audio engineer ==
Boekelheide's film career began in 1974 at American Zoetrope, Francis Ford Coppola’s San Francisco production company. Beginning as a projectionist, Boekelheide gradually acquired sound post-production skills, earning his first screen credit in 1976 as re-recording mixer on Glen Pearcy’s film Fighting For Our Lives.

== Early film career ==
In 1976, Boekelheide accepted an invitation to be an apprentice film editor on a film in post-production in Marin County, California, which turned out to be Star Wars (1977). Soon promoted to assistant editor, he found himself overseeing a wide variety of optical effects, from laser beams and animal chess pieces to lightsabers and optical scene transitions.

His next film was Carroll Ballard’s The Black Stallion (1979), where he started as an assistant film editor, then was promoted to associate film editor, working alongside Robert Dalva through the rough-cut stage of the film. From fine cut through to the end of the project he edited sound, and was responsible for fashioning temp music for the film for each public work-in-progress screening.

== Composing for film ==
The temp music work ignited an interest in film scoring. Boekelheide began to explore this idea by furthering his music education at Mills College in Oakland. The Mills music department was known for its eclectic roots and broad-minded approach. Boekelheide studied harmony and counterpoint with Allaudin Mathieu, Indian raga singing with Terry Riley, conducting with David Rosenboom, and became a member of Lou Harrison’s Javanese gamelan.

After his time at Mills, Boekelheide was asked to score his first film, a short, End of Innocence: June 19, 1953, directed by Stephen Stept. Carroll Ballard’s film Never Cry Wolf was next. Mark Isham was asked to score the film, and Boekelheide produced the score and mixed the film, which earned him an Oscar nomination in 1984. The next year found him mixing the music on Amadeus (1984) which resulted in his winning an Oscar for Best Sound in 1985. Boekelheide went on to mix a number of high-profile films, notably for Philip Kaufman, Peter Weir, Hector Babenco, Bob Rafelson, David Lynch, and David Fincher.

For a time, Boekelheide was both scoring films and mixing films. But as the scoring work increased, the mixing work gradually tapered off, and his last job as a re-recording mixer was for David Fincher on Panic Room in 2002.

As a film composer, Boekelheide came to be known for his scores for documentary films, and was awarded an Emmy for his score for Kids of Survival: The Life and Art of Tim Rollins and K.O.S. in 1999. Emmy nominations followed in 2007 for Boffo! Tinseltown's Bombs and Blockbusters, and again in 2010 for Blessed is the Match. Another Emmy nomination was announced in July 2017, for Symphony of the Soil. He received a Genie Award nomination for Best Original Score at the 14th Genie Awards in 1994, for his work on the 1993 Canadian film Digger.

Boekelheide is a member of both the Academy of Motion Picture Arts and Sciences and the Academy of Television Arts & Sciences, and since 2012 he has regularly served as an advisor for the Sundance Documentary Music and Sound Design Lab, currently held every year at Skywalker Sound in Lucas Valley, near Nicasio, California.

His scoring work continues, with recent credits including 3 1/2 Minutes, 10 Bullets for Marc Silver, and Saving Eden for Bill Couturié.

== Selected filmography ==
- 2015 3 1/2 Minutes, 10 Bullets - Marc Silver
- 2011 Tokyo Waka - John Haptas and Kristine Samuelson
- 2006 Boffo! Tinseltown's Bombs and Blockbusters - Bill Couturié
- 2005 Ballets Russes - Dayna Goldfine and Dan Geller
- 2002 Señorita Extraviada/Missing Young Woman - Lourdes Portillo
- 1999 Fight Club - David Fincher
- 1997 Kids of Survival: The Life and Art of Tim Rollins and K.O.S. - Dan Geller and Dayna Goldfine
- 1991 Hearts of Darkness: A Filmmaker's Apocalypse - Fax Bahr, George Hickenlooper, and Eleanor Coppola
- 1989 The Salute of the Jugger - David Webb Peoples
- 1988 Yosemite: The Fate of Heaven - Jon H. Else
- 1987 Dear America: Letters Home from Vietnam - Bill Couturié
- 1986 Blue Velvet - David Lynch
- 1984 Amadeus - Miloš Forman
- 1983 Never Cry Wolf - Carroll Ballard
- 1979 The Black Stallion - Carroll Ballard
- 1977 Star Wars - George Lucas
