= Lavan Sands =

Beach in Gwynedd, Wales

Coordinates: 53.253066°N 4.05312°W

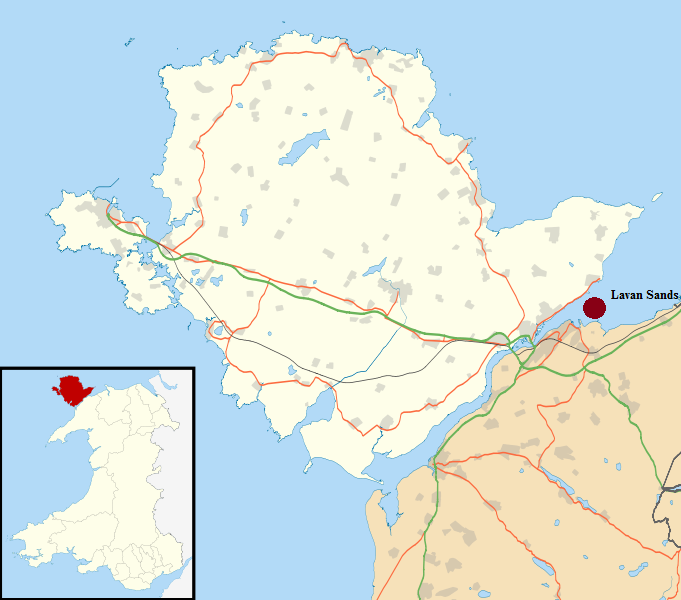
Location of Lavan Sands

Lavan Sands (Welsh: Traeth Lafan) is an intertidal sandbank found in the Menai Strait between Bangor, Gwynedd and Llanfairfechan, Wales. Totally underwater at high tide, at extreme low tides it measures 5.5-mile (8.9 km) east–west and 3.25-mile (5.23 km) north–south. At the western end is found another sandbank Bangor Flats and just north is the sandbank Dutchman's Bank (Welsh: Banc Yr Hen Wyddeles). At low tide the Lavan Sands make the narrowest part of the Menai Strait, at Beaumaris, a mere 237 m (778 ft). The area is designated as an SSSI due in part to the large numbers of Eurasian oystercatchers that migrate there due to the freshwater streams that flow across it.

Historians have speculated that the sands might have been the launch site of the first Roman assault on Anglesey led by Gaius Suetonius Paulinus in 60AD. What is certain is that they were used as a point of departure for the ferries between the mainland and the island until the Menai Suspension Bridge was completed in 1826. Due to the busy shipping lanes in and out of Liverpool, the Sands and Dutchman's Bank have been the location of several shipwrecks over the years involving vessels that have gone off course or have been looking for shelter from the Irish Sea. One of the best known is that of the Rothsay Castle on 18 August 1831 in which 130 people died. The disaster led to the establishment of a lifeboat station at Penmon and to the completion of Trwyn Du Lighthouse in 1837.

From the mainland the Sands are extensively viewable from both the Wales Coast Path and the North Wales Coast Line railway. From Anglesey the best views are from Beaumaris and the Anglesey Coastal Path.
