= PS Rothsay Castle =

Coordinates: 53°17′00″N 04°00′30″W

History
- Name: Rothsay Castle
- Namesake: Rothesay Castle
- Owner: Liverpool & Beaumaris Packet Company
- Launched: 1816
- Fate: Wrecked on 18 August 1831

General characteristics
- Class & type: Paddle steamer
- Tonnage: 75 GRT
- Length: 93 ft (28 m)
- Beam: 16 ft (4.9 m)
- Depth: 8 ft 10 in (2.69 m)
- Propulsion: Paddle propulsion; 2 cylinder compound engine; 2 × boilers

The Rothsay Castle (also spelt Rothesay Castle) was a paddle steamer built in 1816 for service on the River Clyde, Scotland, and was later transferred to Liverpool, England, where she was used for day trips along the coast of North Wales. She was shipwrecked on the Lavan Sands (Welsh: Traeth Lafan) at the eastern end of the Menai Strait, North Wales, in 1831, with the loss of 130 lives.

== Final voyage ==
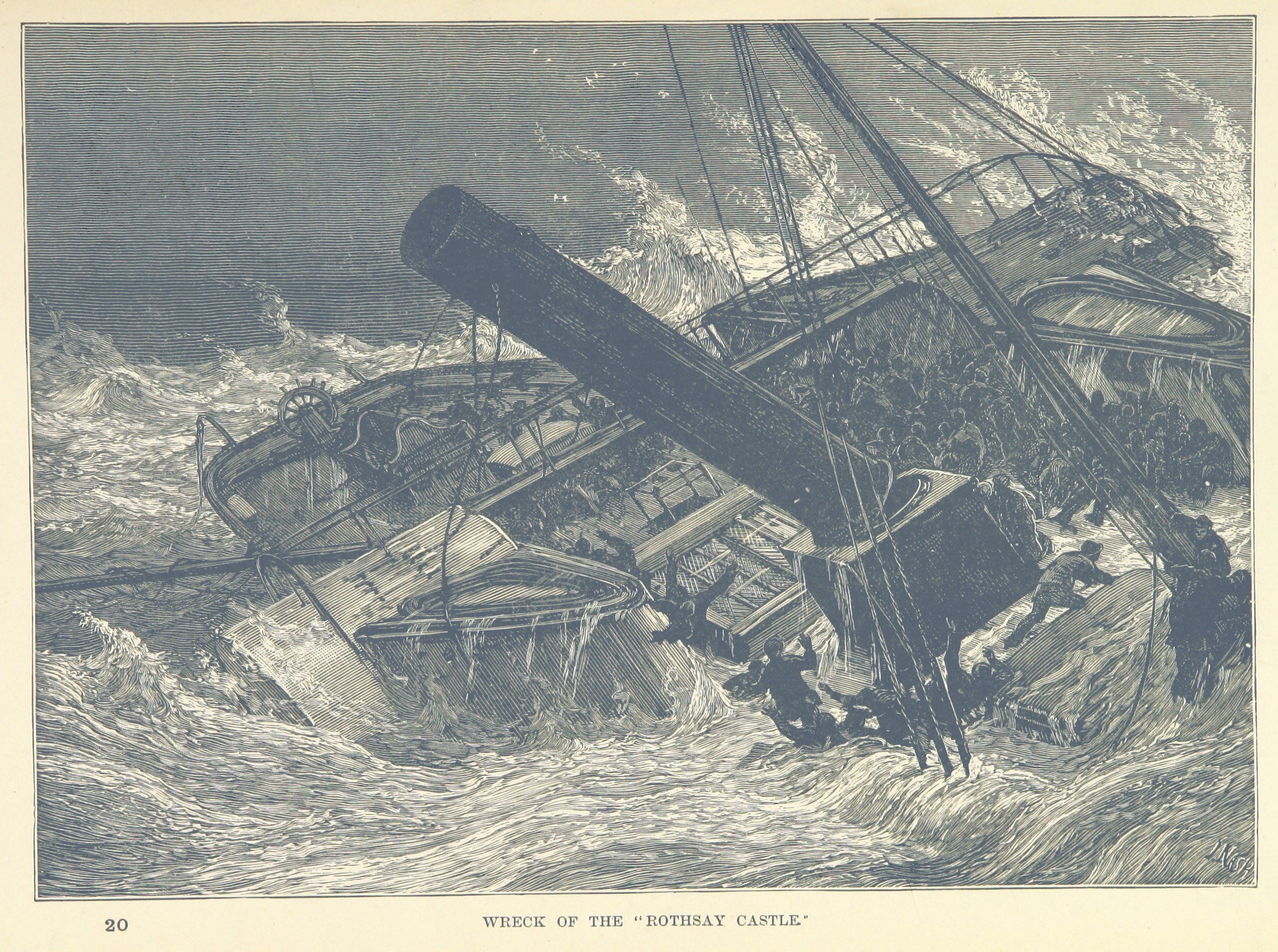
The wreck of the Rothsay Castle

At around midday on 17 August 1831, she left Liverpool carrying 150 passengers. She had intended to leave at 10 am but was delayed by the weather and the late arrival of a passenger.

On leaving the Mersey estuary, she encountered a strong NNW wind and a rough sea. One of the passengers went to see the captain, Captain Atkinson, to ask him to return to port, but he found Atkinson drunk and unwilling to consider turning back. By 10 pm the ship had still only reached the Great Orme and the ship was found to have two feet of water in the stokehold. The pumps were found not to work, there was not even a bucket available for bailing, and the single lifeboat (shipboard) had a hole in the bottom and had no oars. At around 1 am on 18 August the Rothsay Castle ran aground on Dutchman Bank and after a while broke up, the captain and the two mates were swept to their death when the funnel collapsed. Twenty three passengers were rescued in the morning.

Bodies were washed up over a wide area of Anglesey and the Welsh mainland. An inquest was held at Beaumaris and the jury concluded:

had the Rothsay Castle been a seaworthy vessel and properly manned, this awful calamity might have been averted. They therefore cannot disguise their indignation at the conduct of those who could place such a vessel on this station ...

As a result of this man-made disaster, a lifeboat was established at Penmon on the south-east tip of Anglesey in 1832 and Trwyn Du Lighthouse built there in 1837.

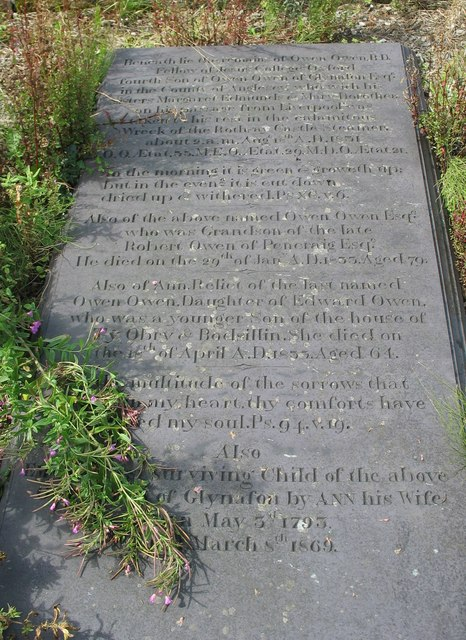
Victims' grave in Llanfaes churchyard

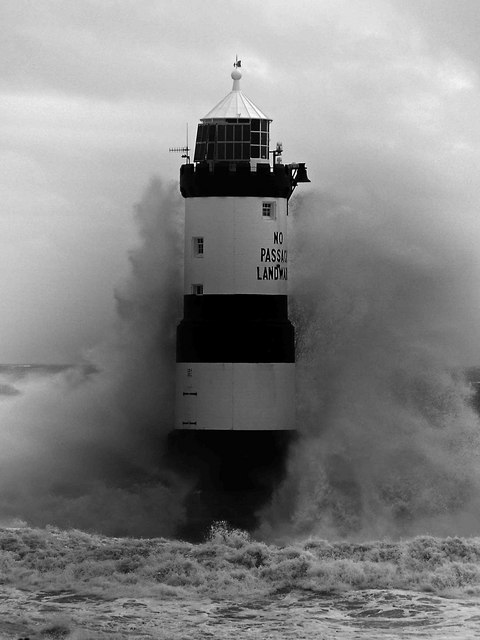
Trwyn Du lighthouse, Penmon
