= Claudio Capponi =

Italian composer

Claudio Capponi (born 20 May 1959, Rome) is an Italian film composer, music arranger, orchestrator, music producer and violist.

== Biography ==
Capponi began his musical career at a young age and graduated from the Conservatorio di Santa Cecilia in Rome, Italy, with high honours in piano, viola and composition. He then became First Solo Violist in the most important Italian orchestras, including the Orchestra dell'Accademia Nazionale di Santa Cecilia, Teatro dell'Opera di Roma, and Teatro di San Carlo in Naples, with conductors such as Leonard Bernstein, Claudio Abbado, Lorin Maazel, Riccardo Muti, Carlo Maria Giulini, and Giuseppe Sinopoli.

An accomplished classical musician, Capponi has also performed with chamber music ensembles such as I Musici, I Virtuosi di Roma, Complesso da camera di Santa Cecilia, Orchestra da camera di Santa Cecilia, and Quartetto Filarmonico di Roma, and has toured such music theatres as the Accademia Musicale Chigiana in Siena and the Mozarteum University of Salzburg, with soloists such as Mstislav Rostropovich and Uto Ughi.

In Italy he has also taught at the Conservatorio di Roma, Pescara and Terni.

In the pop and rock world he has performed live with Angelo Branduardi, Riccardo Cocciante, Richie Havens and Stephen Stills.

Capponi's credits as a film score composer include Voices of Dissent by Carlo Nero, The Fever by Carlo Nero, produced by HBO Films, My House in Umbria by Richard Loncraine, produced by HBO Films, Jane Eyre by Franco Zeffirelli (Miramax), Sparrow by Franco Zeffirelli (CGG), Dio vede e provvede, a miniseries by Enrico Oldoini and P. Costella (LuxVide), Va’ dove ti porta il cuore, by Cristina Comencini (Videa), La fine è nota by Cristina Comencini (RAI 2), Italia-Germania 4-3 by Andrea Barzini (RAI 2), Croce e delizia by Luciano De Crescenzo (Airoldi/DeDionisio), Toscana by Franco Zeffirelli (produced by the Region of Tuscany), Cervellini fritti impanati by Maurizio Zaccaro (IIF), The Valley of Stone by Maurizio Zaccaro (PentaFilm), L’Articolo 2 by Maurizio Zaccaro (ReteItalia/Mikado), E non se ne vogliono andare, miniseries by Giorgio Capitani (Clesi), Ma se poi se ne vanno? miniseries by Giorgio Capitani, (Clesi).

His theatre career includes original music for Franco Zeffirelli's Sei personaggi in cerca d’autore.

Capponi is also composer of music for commercials, having scored the TV advertisements for Telecom Italia, Enel, Alfa Romeo etc.

Labels: Deutsche Grammophon, EMI, Philips, Sony and BMG.

Continuing a family tradition of luthiers, he founded LIUTALY in 2014, a startup company which designs and manufactures "iV" violins and "iC" cellos that integrate and interact with the most recent technologies, smartphones and tablets, to produce alternative sounds.
