= Murder of Jordan Davis =

2012 murder of an American teenager

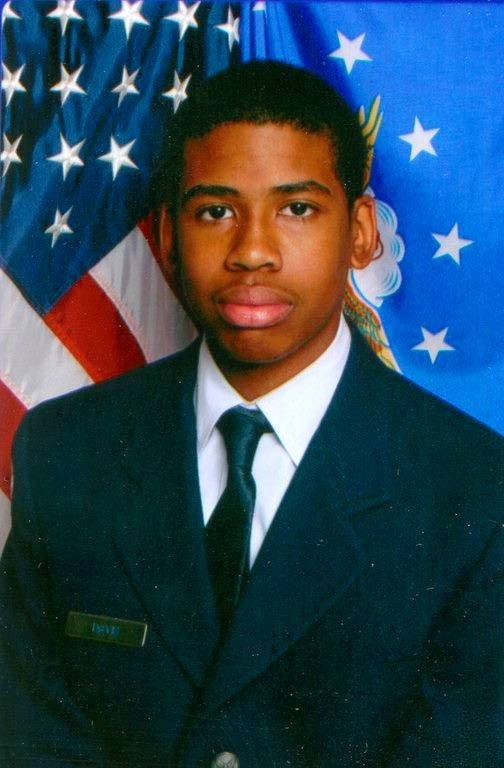
- Davis' Air Force Junior Reserve Officers' Training Corps portrait
- Location: 30°13′8.3″N 81°33′4.1″W; 8251 Southside Boulevard, Jacksonville, Florida, U.S.
- Date: November 23, 2012; 13 years ago 7:30 p.m. (EST)
- Attack type: Child murder by shooting, attempted murder
- Weapon: Taurus PT 99 AF
- Victims: Jordan Russell Davis, aged 17
- Perpetrator: Michael David Dunn
- Motive: Personal argument, anti-black racism
- Verdict: Guilty on all counts
- Convictions: First-degree murder; Attempted murder (3 counts); Firing into an occupied vehicle
- Sentence: Two consecutive life sentences without the possibility of parole (Note: Life in prison without the possibility of parole plus 105 years. Dunn's earliest release date given his multiple sentences means that, even if his first-degree murder conviction were overturned, he still would be released at an age at which it is guaranteed that he would be dead.)

On November 23, 2012, Jordan Davis, a 17-year-old, was murdered in the parking lot of a Gate Petroleum gas station in Jacksonville, Florida by Michael David Dunn, a 45-year-old software developer, during a car-to-car quarrel over loud music being played by the occupants of the vehicle Davis was seated in.

During his initial trial, Dunn was convicted of three counts of attempted second-degree murder of the vehicle's three other occupants, and one count of firing into an occupied vehicle. Dunn had been charged with first-degree murder in the killing of Davis, but the jury could not reach a verdict on this count.

In a second trial, Dunn was found guilty of the first-degree murder charge and sentenced to life imprisonment without the possibility of parole plus 105 years in prison.

== Background ==
Michael Dunn and his fiancée Rhonda Rouer traveled from their home in Satellite Beach, Florida to attend Dunn’s son’s wedding in Orange Park, near Jacksonville, Florida. Dunn and Rouer left the wedding early to return to their hotel and care for their six-month-old puppy. En-route, they stopped at the Gate Petroleum gas station at the corner of Southside Boulevard and Baymeadows Road to purchase potato chips and a bottle of wine.

Tommie Stornes (19), Leland Brunson (17), Jordan Davis (17), and Tevin Thompson (17) had been visiting shopping malls in Stornes' Dodge Durango, when they decided to stop at the same gas station to buy gum and cigarettes.

== Murder ==
At around 7:30 p.m., Brunson, Davis, Thompson, and Stornes pulled into the gas station. Stornes went inside and left his red SUV running. Brunson, Davis, and Thompson remained in the vehicle listening to music described as "very loud" by Dunn, who had pulled his black Volkswagen Jetta into the spot to the right of the Durango. Rouer exited the car to purchase wine and chips. She testified that Dunn told her "I hate that thug music" before she left the car for the store, although Dunn claims that he used the phrase "rap crap."

Dunn was annoyed by the bass from the music playing in the SUV and asked for it to be turned down. The occupants were listening to the song "Beef" by Lil Reese featuring Lil Durk and Fredo Santana. The SUV's front seat passenger, Tevin Thompson, initially complied and turned the volume down, but Jordan Davis requested that the volume be turned back up.

As Stornes returned to the SUV, Davis's protests continued, and an independent witness overheard Dunn say, "No, you're not gonna talk to me that way." No independent witness or any of the SUV occupants recalled hearing Davis threaten Dunn’s life, though Dunn insisted this was the reason for the shooting. Dunn, who had a concealed weapons permit, took a handgun out of his glove compartment and started firing at the rear passenger side door, hitting Davis in the legs, lungs, and aorta. As the SUV fled to evade his gunshots, Dunn opened his door, got into a tactical stance and fired a volley at the rear of the fleeing vehicle. Dunn later testified that he still feared for his safety and that of Rouer, who was about to return to the vehicle.

After the shooting, Stornes drove the SUV away to a nearby parking lot and stopped to find Davis "gasping for air".

Rouer got back in Dunn's car and the two returned to their hotel, where they ordered pizza. Dunn did not contact the police. The next morning, Rouer saw a TV news report about the shooting, which indicated that Jordan Davis had died. Dunn testified that, on the drive home, he called a neighbor who worked in law enforcement to arrange to speak to him about the shooting, but phone records indicate that the neighbor called him, and Rouer testified that the shooting was never mentioned during the call. At 10:30 a.m., Dunn and Rouer arrived at their home in Satellite Beach, where he was arrested after an eyewitness reported his license plate number to police.

After his arrest, Dunn claimed that Davis had threatened him with a "gun or a stick". Rouer, who served as an adversarial witness at the second trial, testified that no such item was ever mentioned to her. Investigators later searched the SUV and found no weapons, but were later criticized by some for not doing a thorough search of the area.

== Legal proceedings ==
Dunn was indicted by a Duval County Grand Jury on charges of first-degree murder in the death of Davis, and of the attempted murder of Stornes, Brunson, and Thompson on December 13, 2012. The trial began on February 3, 2014.

In closing arguments, Dunn's defense lawyer cited the language of Florida's stand-your-ground law. Dunn's self-defense arguments were challenging because no gun or other weapon was found in the Durango.

On February 15, 2014, after more than 30 hours of deliberation, the jury found Dunn guilty on the three counts of attempted murder. The jury could not reach an agreement on the charge of first-degree murder, and the judge declared a mistrial on that count. Former Florida state attorney Angela Corey stated that her office would seek a retrial for this charge. Dunn's attorney subsequently requested that sentencing on the four counts of which Dunn already had been convicted be delayed until after Dunn's retrial. Dunn faced a minimum of 75 years in prison on the following counts: a minimum mandatory sentence of 20 years for each count of attempted second-degree murder, and up to 15 years for firing into a moving vehicle.

Jury selection in Dunn's retrial began on September 22, 2014, and opening statements occurred on September 25. Dunn was found guilty on October 1, 2014. Dunn was given a sentence of life in prison without parole plus 105 years.

Dunn was represented by private defence counsel in the initial trial, but was declared indigent and subsequently represented by court appointed counsel in the second trial.

Following the trial, Dunn's attorney filed for appeal with the First District Court of Appeal for the State of Florida. On November 17, 2016, his appeal was denied.

On June 22, 2020, the Supreme Court of Florida denied review of Dunn's appeal which he based on claims of ineffective assistance of counsel.

Shortly after Davis' death, his parents, Ron Davis and Lucy McBath, and some of the other vehicle occupants filed civil complaints against Dunn. They were represented by John Michael Phillips in wrongful death and defamation lawsuits against Dunn. The cases were settled for an undisclosed amount in January 2014. Dunn's insurance company, Progressive Select Insurance, challenged its duty to cover the lawsuit but dismissed its lawsuit in conjunction with the settlement.

== Aftermath ==
=== Reactions ===
Dunn's former neighbor, Charles Hendrix, said he was not surprised by his behavior. Hendrix described Dunn as arrogant and controlling, adding that Dunn's ex-wives told him that Dunn was violent and abusive toward them, although he never personally witnessed this. Hendrix spoke of a previous discussion in which Dunn asked him if he knew anyone who would "take care of" someone who infuriated him in an unrelated incident, and Hendrix interpreted further discussion as Dunn wanting to put a hit on this person.

Dunn's daughter, Rebecca Dunn, defended her father's story in her statement during an interview, "He is going to protect himself if he sees no other way than to bring out his gun, then that's what he's going to do." She described Dunn as "a good man. He's not a racist. He's very loving."

Davis' father, Ron Davis, said, "I'm in constant contact with Tracy Martin, Trayvon's father, and I text Sybrina [Trayvon's mother] all the time, and I just want to let them know, every time I get justice for Jordan, it's going to be justice for Trayvon, for us." He said he wanted to confront Dunn in jail about his son's murder.

Davis' mother, Lucy McBath, ran for Congress in Georgia's 6th congressional district in 2018, running on a platform that included reform of gun laws. McBath cited the activism of students after the Stoneman Douglas High School shooting as a reason for her run. She narrowly defeated incumbent Karen Handel, winning 160,139 votes (50.5%) to Handel's 156,875 (49.5%). In 2020, she defeated Handel in a rematch to win reelection to a second term.

Davis' murder is one of many referenced by social justice activists (including many black parents) as a reminder that unarmed children who die at the hands of police or white men matter as human beings. ABC News, Australia says the case has become part of the national conversation about the dangers facing young black men in America today. The murder is believed to have inspired activism of the Black Lives Matter movement. During the 2016 Democratic National Convention, Davis's mother, Lucy McBath, talked about supporting the Black Lives Matter movement and said, "His death doesn't overshadow his life."

Rapper Lil Reese, whose song was being played by Jordan Davis at the time of his murder, tweeted condolences to Davis and his family, using the hashtag "#JusticeForJordanDavis".

The murder was one of the primary inspirations for the award-winning young-adult novel Dear Martin, by Nic Stone.

== Documentaries ==
In January 2015, the documentary 3 ½ Minutes, 10 Bullets (originally titled 3 ½ Minutes) premiered at the Sundance Film Festival. The documentary, directed by Marc Silver, explores the shooting, the trial, and Florida's Stand Your Ground laws. The documentary won the U.S. Documentary Special Jury Award for Social Impact at the 2015 Sundance Film Festival. The film distribution was sold to HBO.

Davis' story is also featured in the 2015 documentary film The Armor of Light, the directorial debut of Disney heir Abigail Disney. The film follows Rob Schenck, a pro-life Evangelical minister; Lucy McBath, the mother of teenager Jordan Davis; and attorney John Michael Phillips as they interact in the years after the shooting. The film debates the question: "Is it possible to be both pro-gun and pro-life?" The Armor of Light premiered at the Tribeca Film Festival in April 2015 before opening theatrically on October 30, 2015.

== See also ==
- Crime in Florida
- Mothers of the Movement
