= Trwyn Du Lighthouse =

Lighthouse in Anglesey, Wales

Trwyn Du Lighthouse Penmon Point
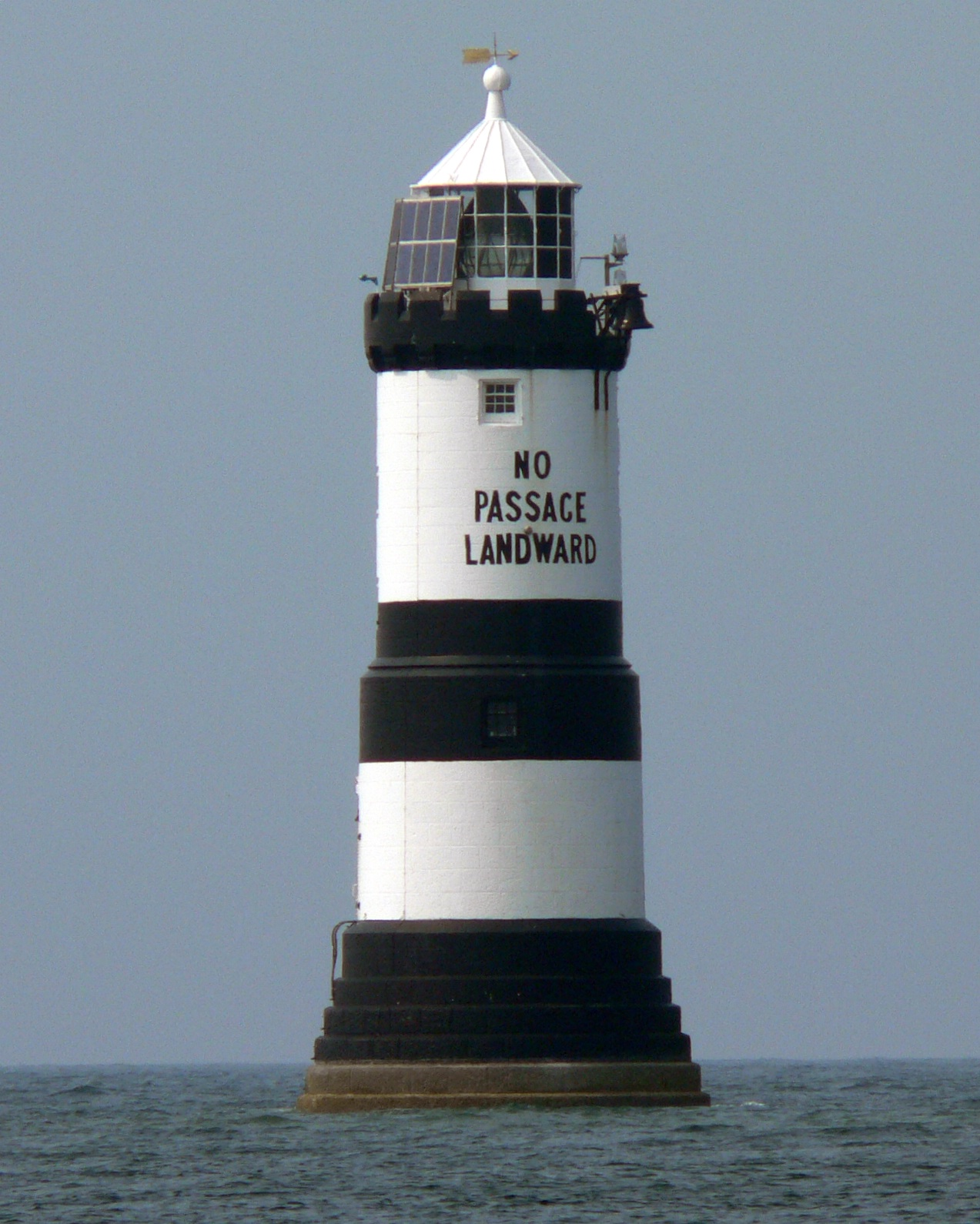
- Trwyn Du Lighthouse
- Location: Penmon; Anglesey; Wales; United Kingdom
- Coordinates: 53.312994°N 4.040630°W

Tower
- Constructed: 1838
- Built by: James Walker
- Construction: stone tower
- Automated: 1922
- Height: 29 m (95 ft)
- Shape: cylindrical tower with balcony and lantern
- Markings: white and black bands tower, white lantern
- Operator: Trinity House
- Heritage: Grade II* listed building
- Fog signal: None.

Light
- Focal height: 19 m (62 ft)
- Lens: 1st Order catadioptric fixed
- Intensity: 3,088 candela
- Range: 12 nmi (22 km)
- Characteristic: Fl W 5s.

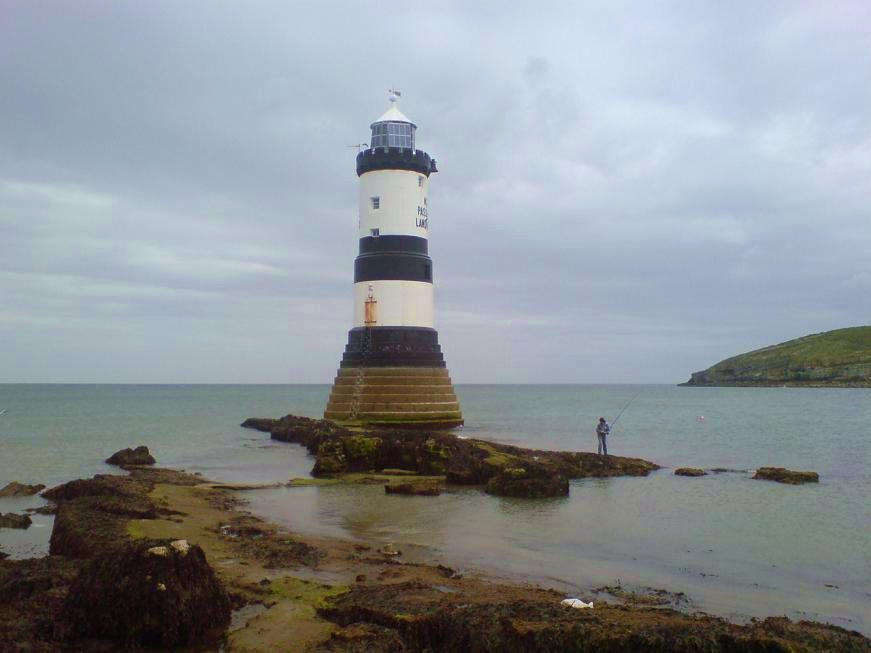
Trwyn Du Lighthouse

Trwyn Du Lighthouse, also known as Penmon Lighthouse, is a lighthouse between Black Point near Penmon and Ynys Seiriol, or Puffin Island, at the eastern extremity of Anglesey, marking the passage between the two islands.

== History ==
The first lighthouse was erected in 1838, at a price of £11,589. There had been a call for a light at this location for some years by master shipmen in the nearby city of Liverpool, especially after the steamer the Rothsay Castle ran aground and broke up on nearby Lavan Sands in 1831 with 130 people losing their lives.

The present Lighthouse, built 1835–1838, is 29 metres (95 ft) tall and was designed by James Walker. It was his first sea-washed tower, and a prototype for his more ambitious tower on the Smalls.

The Lighthouse has a stepped-base designed to discourage the huge upsurge of waves that had afflicted earlier lighthouses on the site and reduce the force of the water at the bottom of the tower.

Austere vertical walls, instead of the usual graceful lines of other rock towers, are probably an economy measure. The tower has a crenellated stone parapet, in preference to iron railings on the gallery, and narrows in diameter above the half-way point. These are features used by Walker in his other lighthouse designs. The tower is distinguished by its original three black bands painted on a white background. Its also bears the words "NO PASSAGE LANDWARD" on its north and south sides.

Walker also pioneered, unsuccessfully, the use of a primitive water closet, comprising a specially designed drain exiting at the base of the tower. The stepped design of the lighthouse may have helped water exit the closet, but surges of seawater made its use difficult during heavy weather.

The light-source initially was a 4-wick Argand lamp, set within a first-order fixed catadioptric optic manufactured by Isaac Cookson & co. It displayed a fixed red light.

One of the many lighthouse keepers was Joseph Steer, born in 1831 at Bovey Tracey, Devon.

== Modernisation ==
In 1922 Trwyn Du became the first Trinity House lighthouse to be automated, when it was converted to unwatched acetylene operation.

The lamp was converted to solar power in 1996 and the lighthouse was modernised extensively at that time.

At present the Lighthouse has a 15,000 candela light that flashes once every 5 seconds and can be seen 12 nmi (22 km) away. There was also a lifeboat station built in 1832, nearby, but this closed in 1915.

The tower has been unmanned since 1922 and is checked from Holyhead Control Centre. In August 2019 Trinity House started trials of a new fog horn, stating, "The bell is activated by an ageing electronic striker mechanism which no longer provides the assurance of reliability which is needed."

== Access and facilities ==
Penmon Point is accessible by heading east out of Beaumaris and through Llangoed. For a small fee you can go along a toll road and park very close to the lighthouse or park for free about a mile from the lighthouse. The area around Dinmor contains a cafe, shop and toilets and is good for fishing.

== See also ==
- List of lighthouses in Wales
- Grade II* listed buildings in Anglesey

== Sources ==
- Hague, D., B., The Lighthouses of Wales Their Architecture and Archaeology (The Royal Commission on the Ancient and Historical Monuments of Wales, Edited by Hughes, S., 1994) ISBN 1-871184-08-8
