= Adam Hann-Byrd =

American actor (born 1982)

- Born: February 23, 1982 (age 44); New York City, New York
- Education: Wesleyan University
- Occupations: Actor; screenwriter
- Years active: 1990–present
- Spouse: Dara Epstein (m. 2017)
- Website: www.adamhannbyrd.com

Adam Hann-Byrd (born February 23, 1982) is an American screenwriter and former actor most recognized for his roles as the young Alan Parrish in Jumanji, Tate in Little Man Tate, and Charlie in Halloween H20: 20 Years Later.

== Life ==
Hann-Byrd was born in New York City, the son of Jacquie Hann, a children's book illustrator and author, and Jeff Byrd, a television cameraman. He has one sister, Maya. In 2004, Hann-Byrd graduated from Wesleyan University in Connecticut with degrees in psychology and film studies. Hann-Byrd resides in Los Angeles, California. In 2017, he married Dara Epstein.

== Career ==
Hann-Byrd made his film debut in 1991's Little Man Tate, directed by and also starring Jodie Foster. In 1995, he appeared as the young Alan Parrish in Jumanji at age 13, with Robin Williams portraying the character's adult counterpart. He has also appeared in films such as Diabolique (1996) and The Ice Storm (1997). In 1998, he appeared as Charlie Deveraux in Halloween H20: 20 Years Later and in Uninvited in 1999.

In 2009, Hann-Byrd began working behind the camera after getting a job in the writers room for the second and third seasons of the television show Fringe. In 2011, he spent a year as a fellow in the Warner Bros. Television Writers Workshop. Subsequently, Hann-Byrd served as a writer for the Hulu series The Morning After and as a writer/producer for Participant Media's Brain Food Daily.

He is currently a Senior Narrative Designer at Series Entertainment Inc., where he has been working since August 2024, contributing to a currently undisclosed project.

== Filmography ==
Year	Film	Role	Notes
1991	Little Man Tate	Fred Tate	
1993	Digger	Digger	
1994	NYPD Blue	Nick Williamson	2 episodes
1995	Jumanji	Young Alan Parrish	
1996	Diabolique	Erik Pretzer	
1996	Souvenir	Young Charles	Voice
1997	The Ice Storm	Sandy Carver	
1998	Halloween H20: 20 Years Later	Charlie Deveraux	
1999	The Outer Limits	Kevin Buchanan	Episode: "Stranded"
1999	Uninvited	Young Tony Grasso	
2009	Totally Sketch	Craig	Web series; Episode: "Got Sex?"
2009	Simone	Walker	
2011	Guess Whom	Adam	Short
2016	Kino–Edwards Picture Show	Martha	Episode: "Who's Afraid of Virginia Woolf?"
