= Folio Weekly =

Alternative newspaper in Jacksonville, Florida

- Type: Alternative weekly
- Format: Tabloid
- Founded: April 1987
- Headquarters: 624 Goodwin Street Jacksonville, Florida 32204, US
- Website: folioweekly.com

Folio Weekly is an alternative weekly publication in Jacksonville, Florida. It covers topics such as politics, lifestyle, and entertainment.

It is the largest and most influential alternative magazine in Northeast Florida and is distributed in Duval, St. Johns and Clay.

== History ==
The newspaper was founded in April 1987.

It is a member of the Association of Alternative Newsmedia and has won multiple AAN Awards. The paper has an unverified circulation of 60,000 plus print copies monthly and has grown to over 200,000 in readership each issue as of June 2023 .

It was acquired by Boldland Press, Inc. in 2020. Attorney John Michael Phillips has been linked to the ownership group.

In March 2021, it was converted into a monthly newspaper. It has since begun to publish twice a month after it was acquired by Boldland Press Inc.
