= Uninvited (1999 film) =

- Directed by: Carlo Gabriel Nero
- Written by: James Gabriel Berman (novel); Carlo Gabriel Nero
- Starring: Vanessa Redgrave; Franco Nero; Eli Wallach; Adam Hann-Byrd
- Cinematography: Giancarlo Ferrando
- Edited by: Paolo Benassi
- Music by: Carlo Siliotto
- Distributed by: Vine International Pictures
- Release date: 26 November 1999 (Argentina)
- Running time: 90 min
- Countries: Italy; United States
- Language: English

Uninvited is a 1999 Italian thriller film directed by Carlo Gabriel Nero, and starring Vanessa Redgrave and Franco Nero. It premiered at the Mar del Plata Film Festival in Argentina on 26 November 1999 before its release in Italy on 19 May 2000.

== Plot ==
Tony has lusted after Patricia his whole life, ever since high school. While his yearning never ceased, he was only ever to appreciate her from a distance. Tony becomes a victim of his own heart when he is named chief suspect to the murder of Patricia, her husband and her children. As Tony is incarcerated, his lawyer Barolo struggles to make a case of defence. Meanwhile, Tony struggles to come to terms with Patricia's death.

== Cast ==
- Vanessa Redgrave as Mrs. Ruttenburn
- Franco Nero as Avvocato Ralph Barolo
- Eli Wallach as Strasser
- Adam Hann-Byrd as Young Tony Grasso
- Kevin Isola as Tony Grasso
- Bethel Leslie as Mrs. Wentworth
- Stephen Mendillo as Vincent Grasso
- Patricia Dunnock as Rose Grasso
- Olivia Birkelund as Patricia Macchiato Carver
- Barton Tinapp as Kirk Carver
- Jessica Munch as Young Patricia
- Jennifer Wiltsie as Charlotte Celeste Hinney
- Nick Sandow as Ed
- Tommy J. Michaels as Koosh
