= 3 1/2 Minutes, 10 Bullets =

- Film poster
- Directed by: Marc Silver
- Written by: Marc Silver
- Produced by: Carolyn Hepburn; Minette Nelson
- Cinematography: Marc Silver
- Edited by: Emiliano Battista & Gideon Gold
- Music by: Todd Boekelheide
- Production companies: Candescent Films; Motto Pictures
- Distributed by: HBO Documentary Films
- Release dates: January 24, 2015 (Sundance); November 23, 2015 (HBO)
- Running time: 98 minutes
- Country: United States
- Language: English
- Box office: $30,407

3 1/2 Minutes, 10 Bullets, also known as 3 1/2 Minutes, is a 2015 American documentary film written and directed by Marc Silver. The film is based on the events surrounding the 2012 murder of Jordan Russell Davis and examines the shooting itself, as well as the subsequent trial, media coverage and protests that resulted from the shooting.

The film premiered under its original title 3 1/2 Minutes at the Sundance Film Festival on January 24, 2015, later winning the Special Jury Prize for Social Impact. The film was then bought by HBO Documentary Films, and premiered on HBO on November 23, 2015. On December 1, it was one of 15 films shortlisted for the Academy Award for Best Documentary Feature for the 2016 89th Academy Awards.

== Synopsis ==
The film takes a look at the shooting of Jordan Davis, an African-American teenager who was shot by Michael Dunn on November 23, 2012, at a gas station in Jacksonville, Florida. The shooting was sparked by an argument between Dunn and Davis over loud rap music. Dunn would later claim in court that he believed that Davis possessed a shotgun and was going to harm him. In the film Silver examines the shooting as well as the subsequent trial, media coverage and protests that resulted from the shooting, especially those stemming from the Black Lives Matter movement.

The film's title refers to the time between when Dunn pulled into the parking spot next to the vehicle Davis was in (seen as 7:30-7:33 PM), and how many bullets were fired (Approximately 10, from Dunn's Taurus PT 99 AF).

== Production ==
Plans to create the documentary began when producer Minette Nelson read a 2013 Rolling Stone article about the case and Florida's stand-your-ground laws. She contacted Silver and asked him to serve as the film's director. Through family lawyer John Michael Phillips, Nelson and Silver met Jordan's parents Ron Davis and Lucy McBath. He became interested in the documentary after meeting the family and noting the short amount of time between Dunn's arrival and the shooting, as he felt that the three and a half minutes could be understood in two different ways: "On the one level, through the court system, you would understand what happened during those three-and-a-half minutes in a very pragmatic way. Then [you have] what really happened in those moments on a bigger, more conceptual level."

Filming took place in Jacksonville, Florida, over a nine-month period in 2013, primarily using a Canon C100. Silver and his crew gained permission to film the Dunn trial, but only if they did not film the jury, as this could have resulted in a mistrial. They agreed, and filmed the trial from the back of the courtroom.

== Release ==
The film premiered in the US Documentary Competition at Sundance in 2015. After screenings, the film was bought by HBO, to be aired in the late fall of 2015. The official trailer for the film was released on YouTube on August 25, 2015, and the film aired on HBO on November 23, 2015, at 9 PM. It is currently available for viewing on Google Play.

== Reception ==
=== Critical response ===
The film received universal acclaim. Rotten Tomatoes gave the film a 100% rating based on 50 reviews, with an average rating of 7.7/10. The website's critical consensus reads, "3 And 1/2 Minutes, 10 Bullets tells a gut-wrenching story in overall gripping fashion -- and wisely underplays its outrage, letting the details speak for themselves." Metacritic gave the film a weighted average score of 77/100 based on 20 reviews, indicating "generally favorable" reviews.

Matt Zoller Seitz of RogerEbert.com gave the film 3 out of 4 stars, saying "The movie's meditative quality makes you feel for everyone involved in this tragedy—even Dunn, who seems very much a prisoner of fear and anger. Where a lot of documentaries would try to stir outrage, this one just leaves you shaking your head." Variety film critic Dennis Harvey also gave the film a positive review, noting "Though there are a few odd gaps in the gripping pic, and/or perhaps in the trial itself... the assembly is tight and accomplished on all levels." IndieWire film critic Aramide Tinubu gave a positive review, saying: "More than seeking answers, [this documentary] sparks so many questions. It reminds us of what is broken in our country. It brings up questions of privilege as well as the constant, vicious, deeply rooted, fear and hatred, that many white people in this country still feel towards people of color."

=== Awards and nominations ===
On December 1, the film was selected as one of 15 shortlisted for the Academy Award for Best Documentary Feature.

Year	Festival	Award	Category	Recipients and nominees	Outcome
2015	African-American Film Critics Association (AAFCA)	AAFCA Award	Top 10 Films (6th Tied with Dope)		Won
2015	East End Film Festival, UK	Best Documentary		Marc Silver	Nominated
2015	Jerusalem Film Festival 2015	In Spirit for Freedom Award	Best Documentary	Marc Silver	Nominated
2015	RiverRun International Film Festival	Audience Choice Award	Best Documentary Feature	Marc Silver	Won
2015	Sheffield International Documentary Festival	Sheffield Youth Jury Award		Marc Silver	Won
2015	Sundance Film Festival	Special Jury Prize	Documentary- Social Impact	Marc Silver	Won
2015	Sundance Film Festival	Grand Jury Prize		Marc Silver	Nominated
2015	Zurich Film Festival	Golden Eye	Best International Documentary Film	Marc Silver	Nominated
