= The Fever (2004 film) =

- DVD cover for The Fever
- Directed by: Carlo Gabriel Nero
- Written by: Wallace Shawn; Carlo Gabriel Nero
- Produced by: Jason Blum
- Starring: Vanessa Redgrave; Michael Moore; Joely Richardson; Angelina Jolie
- Cinematography: Mark Moriarty
- Edited by: Mel Quigley
- Music by: Claudio Capponi
- Production company: Blumhouse Productions
- Distributed by: HBO Films
- Release dates: September 24, 2004 (San Sebastián International Film Festival); June 13, 2007 (United States)
- Running time: 83 minutes
- Countries: United Kingdom; United States
- Language: English

The Fever is a 2004 psychological drama film produced by HBO Films, directed by Carlo Gabriel Nero and based on the 1990 play of the same name by Nero and actor Wallace Shawn.

The film stars the director's mother, Vanessa Redgrave, and includes cameos by Angelina Jolie, the director's half-sister Joely Richardson and Oscar-winning documentary filmmaker Michael Moore.

== Background ==
The original play was a piece of experimental theater performed as a monologue by the play's author, Wallace Shawn. Unlike conventional plays, Shawn initially performed The Fever not in a theater, but in private homes by appointment. Later, he performed the piece in a theater, but in keeping with the desire to be unconventional in presentation, Shawn eschewed theatrical lighting, sets, and theater programs, and mingled with the audience immediately before the play began. In an interview with The Paris Review, Shawn explained that he used these novel approaches to avoid people dismissing the play's message as merely "great theater."

== Plot ==
The film follows the existential crisis of an unnamed urban sophisticate (Vanessa Redgrave) who becomes aware of the nature of world politics, economic exploitation and the vapid consumerism around her. A series of events lead her to visit an unnamed third world country, representing an exotic location somewhere in Eastern Europe, where the entire economy and populace are geared towards the tourist industry. Even as she enjoys the rare taste of its products she is made starkly aware of the reality behind the façade by a journalist (Michael Moore) who, subsequently, suggests a visit to the country's war-torn neighbour in order to experience a true picture of life in the region. She does so and her life is changed forever.

Once back, and now acutely attuned to the world about her, she can no longer fit back into her old elitist and consumer-driven lifestyle; watching operas, discussing art and theatre with friends, shopping for "beautiful things" and aggrandizing her trifling everyday struggles, all seem meaningless to her compared with her recent macro epiphany. Compared with the global struggle for existence, her life begins to feel insignificant. Having lived in the bubble her guilt-free, pleasure-filled life, she is now challenged to look beyond comfort and soon finds herself in the throes of a moral dilemma, questioning the moral consistency of her own life and the choices that have affected the lives of the poor in far corners of the globe. She feels that she cannot be truly free having apprehended this new reality, which confronts her blindness to the harsh truths of the class struggle and her sense of entitlement, which had, in the past, been broken, only occasionally, by displays of sympathy.

She returns to the war-torn nation to explore her feelings further, this new reality now drawing her ever-deeper. This leads to a delirious bout of fever in a run-down hotel where her inner-self challenges her need for comfort and entitlement, culminating in a moment of spiritual awakening and a perceived 'oneness' with all reality. Finally she sees the truth about her own life and her innate connection with every human being, apprehending the transient nature of her material life. She can no longer sit, immersed in her personal comforts and vanity, or "clean sheets" as she terms it, and pretend it's all right when the world around her is filled with strife and exploitation for millions of people. She is lustrated of her previous immunity towards their predicament and is, by extension, finally able to see the truth of her own life, as summarised by the film's tag-line: Enlightenment Can Be Brutal.

== Cast ==
- Vanessa Redgrave as Woman
- Angelina Jolie as Revolutionary
- Michael Moore as Reporter
- Joely Richardson as Woman At 30

== Production ==
The film was shot in studio and on location in Zagreb, Croatia. Additional location shooting was done in England and North Wales, specifically Snowdonia and Penmon.

== Awards ==
- 2005: Bratislava International Film Festival:Grand Prix: Carlo Gabriel Nero: Nominated
- 2008: Screen Actors Guild Awards: Outstanding Performance by a Female Actor in a Television Movie or Miniseries: Vanessa Redgrave: Nominated

== Reception ==
A review in The New York Times describes Shawn's play as a "controversial study of the growing chasm between the first and third world."
The same newspaper describes the film adaptation as "a drama that employs animation and thought-provoking first-person monologues to explore the concept of bourgeois privilege."
