= Puffin Island (Anglesey) =

Island in Anglesey, Wales

Native name: Ynys Seiriol
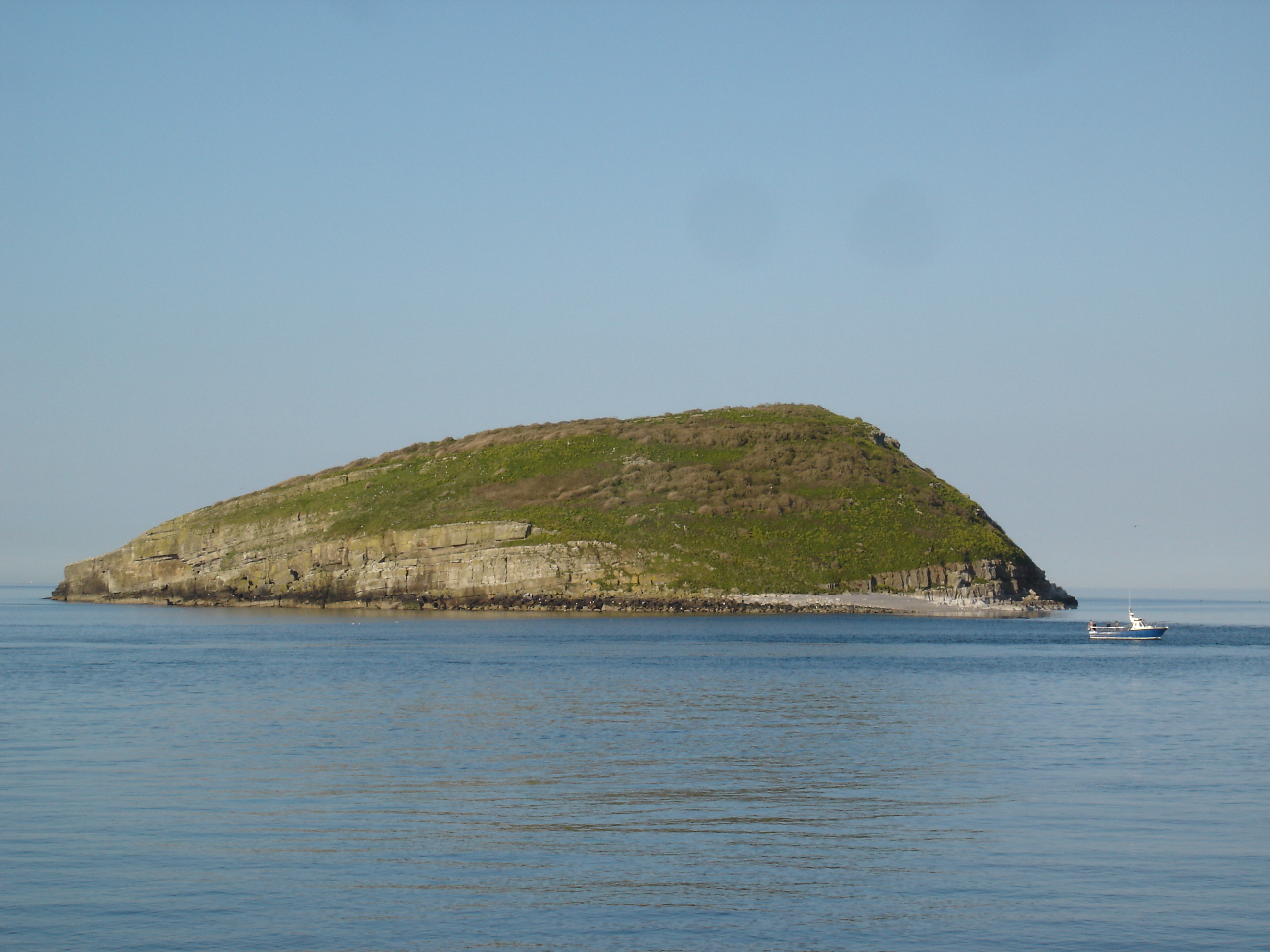
- Puffin Island seen from Penmon Point

- Location within Wales

Geography
- Location: Anglesey, Wales
- Coordinates: 53.31667°N 4.01667°W

Administration
- Wales
- County: Isle of Anglesey

Demographics
- Population: 0 (uninhabited)

Puffin Island (Welsh: Ynys Seiriol) is an uninhabited island off the eastern tip of Anglesey, Wales. It was formerly known as Priestholm in English (and Ynys Lannog/Glannog in Welsh). A hermitage was established here around the 6th century, and there are remains of a 12th-century monastery on the island. The island is also a Special Protection Area for wildlife.

== Geography ==
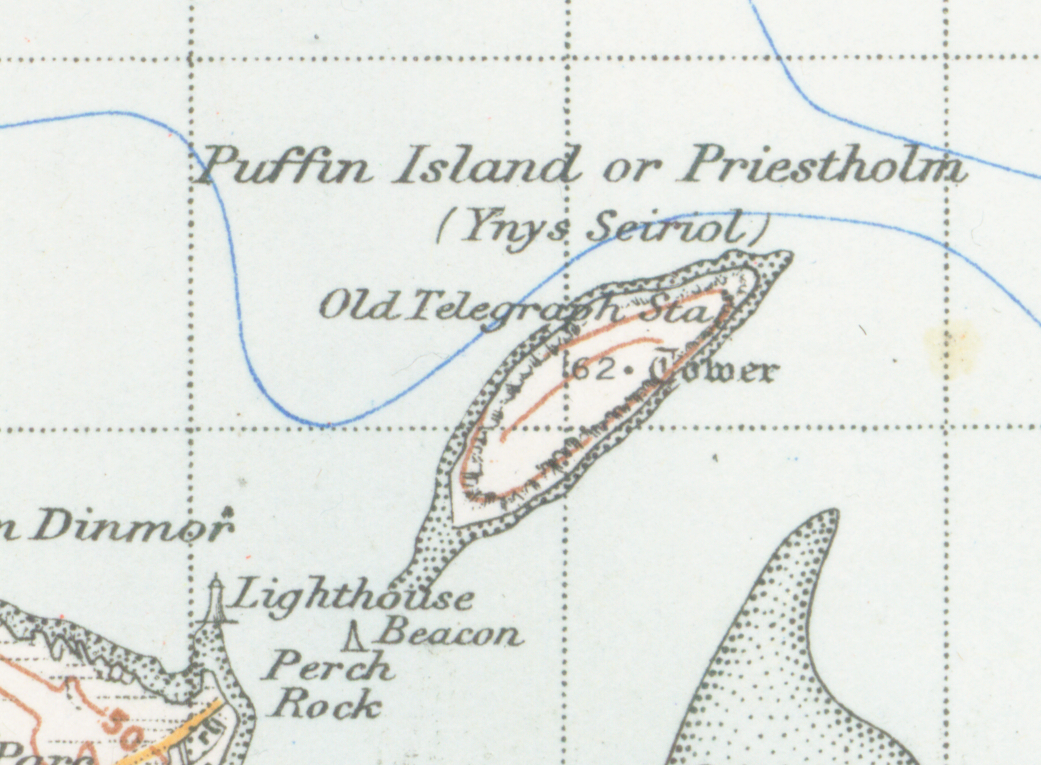
A map of the island from 1947

Puffin Island is the ninth-largest island off the coast of Wales and marks the northeastern end of the Menai Strait. Puffin Island's highest point is carboniferous limestone, at 192 feet (59 m) above sea level, having steep cliffs on all sides. It has an area of 69 acres (0.28 km^{2}). The island is privately owned by the Baron Hill estate.

== History ==
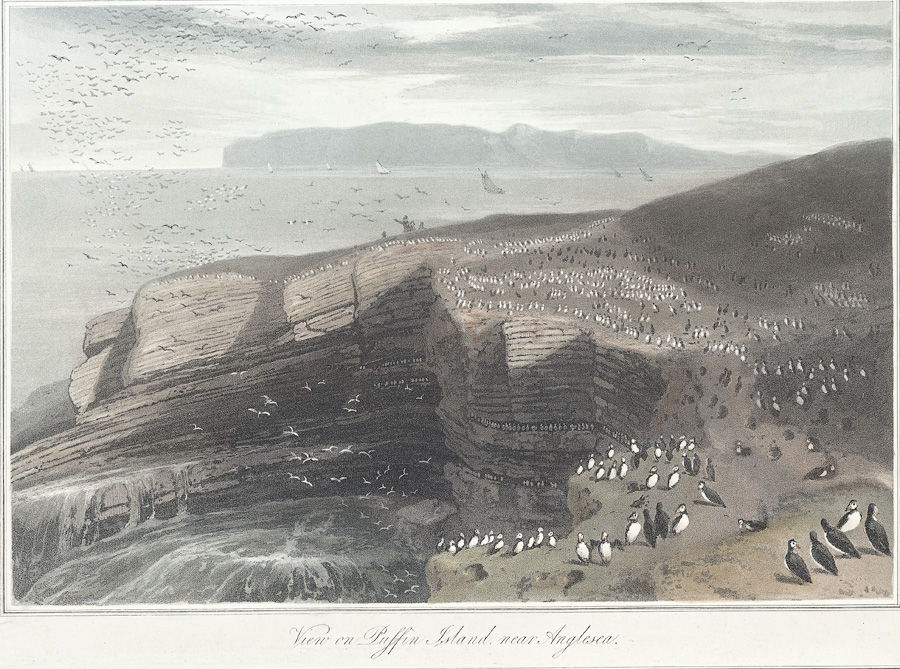
View on Puffin Island, 1815

The Welsh name, Ynys Seiriol, refers to Saint Seiriol. The son of Owain Ddantgwyn, a 5th-century ruler of the Kingdom of Gwynedd, and the brother of Saint Einion Frenin, a 5th or 6th-century king in the Llŷn Peninsula, Seiriol founded and governed a class (an ecclesiastical settlement) at Penmon on Anglesey. It became famous and attracted Christians among the Scandinavians of Ireland. In later life, Seiriol abandoned his responsibilities there to establish a hermitage on the nearby island, where his remains are thought to rest.

King Cadwallon ap Cadfan of Gwynedd is said to have sheltered here in around 630 when fleeing an invasion from the Kingdom of Northumbria. A monastery existed on the island in the late 12th century and was mentioned by Gerald of Wales, who visited the area in 1188. He claimed that, whenever there was strife within the community of monks, a plague of mice would devour all their food. Llywelyn the Great issued two charters in 1221 and 1237 confirming the Canons Regular, in possession of the island and the church and manor of Penmon on the mainland of Anglesey.

The ruins of several ecclesiastical buildings are visible on the island, including the remains of a 12th-century church, which has a Grade I heritage listing. The central tower and the foundations of the nave remain. The remains of the chancel and south transept have been covered by a 19th-century cottage and building.

Much later a telegraph station was built on the northeastern tip of the island. It is now disused.

There is one identified shipwreck, a steamship named The Pioneer, which ran ashore in 1878 with a cargo of iron bars when the tow lines to it broke following its rescue from engine failure near the Skerries.

== Wildlife ==
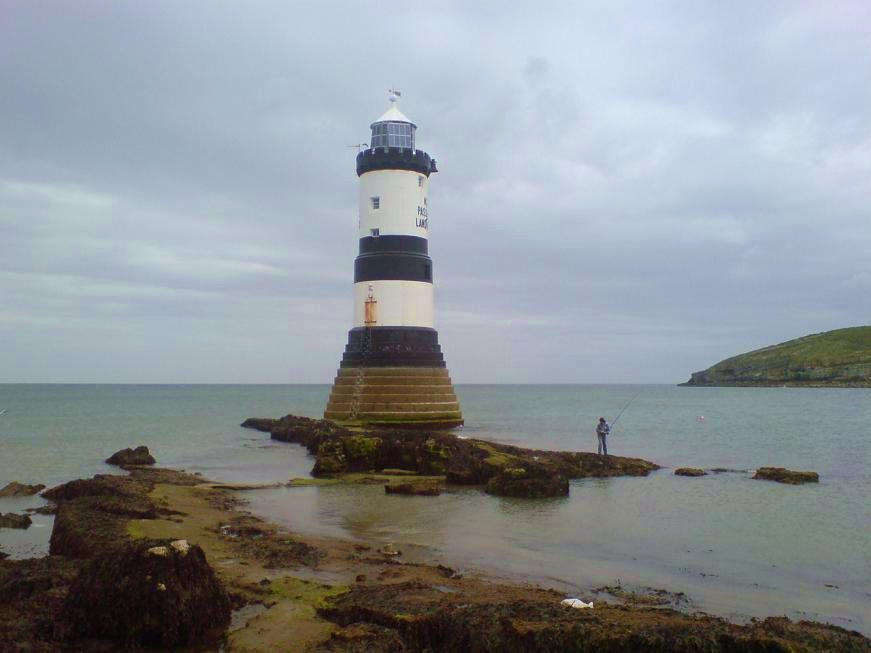
Trwyn Du Lighthouse near the island

The island is a Special Protection Area (SPA), particularly because of its great cormorant colony of over 750 birds, which is over 10% of the national population, making it one of the largest colonies in the British Isles. It also has good numbers of guillemot, razorbill, shag and kittiwake nesting, and in recent years small numbers of common eider and black guillemot. The Atlantic puffins from which the island gets its modern English name bred in considerable numbers at one time, with up to 2000 pairs recorded. The brown rat was introduced accidentally to the island, probably in the late 19th century, and reduced this population to a very few pairs. A programme of poisoning these rats started in 1998 by the Countryside Council for Wales appears to have eradicated them, and the puffin population has shown an increase since that date.

At one time the island was heavily grazed by rabbits, but these were wiped out by an outbreak of myxomatosis, leading to the growth of dense vegetation, particularly common elder (Sambucus nigra).

The strong currents around the island provide for an abundance of marine life, particularly on the north coast, where the depths reach 15 metres (8 fathoms). Many people enjoy fishing trips departing from Beaumaris in these waters, catching mainly mackerel, but many other species are caught. The abundance of fish feeds a large colony of grey seals, and bottlenose dolphins and harbour porpoises regularly visit the area. Pleasure cruises are also available from Easter to October to view the island, its seal colony and birdlife.
