= Digger (1993 film) =

Canadian comedy-drama film

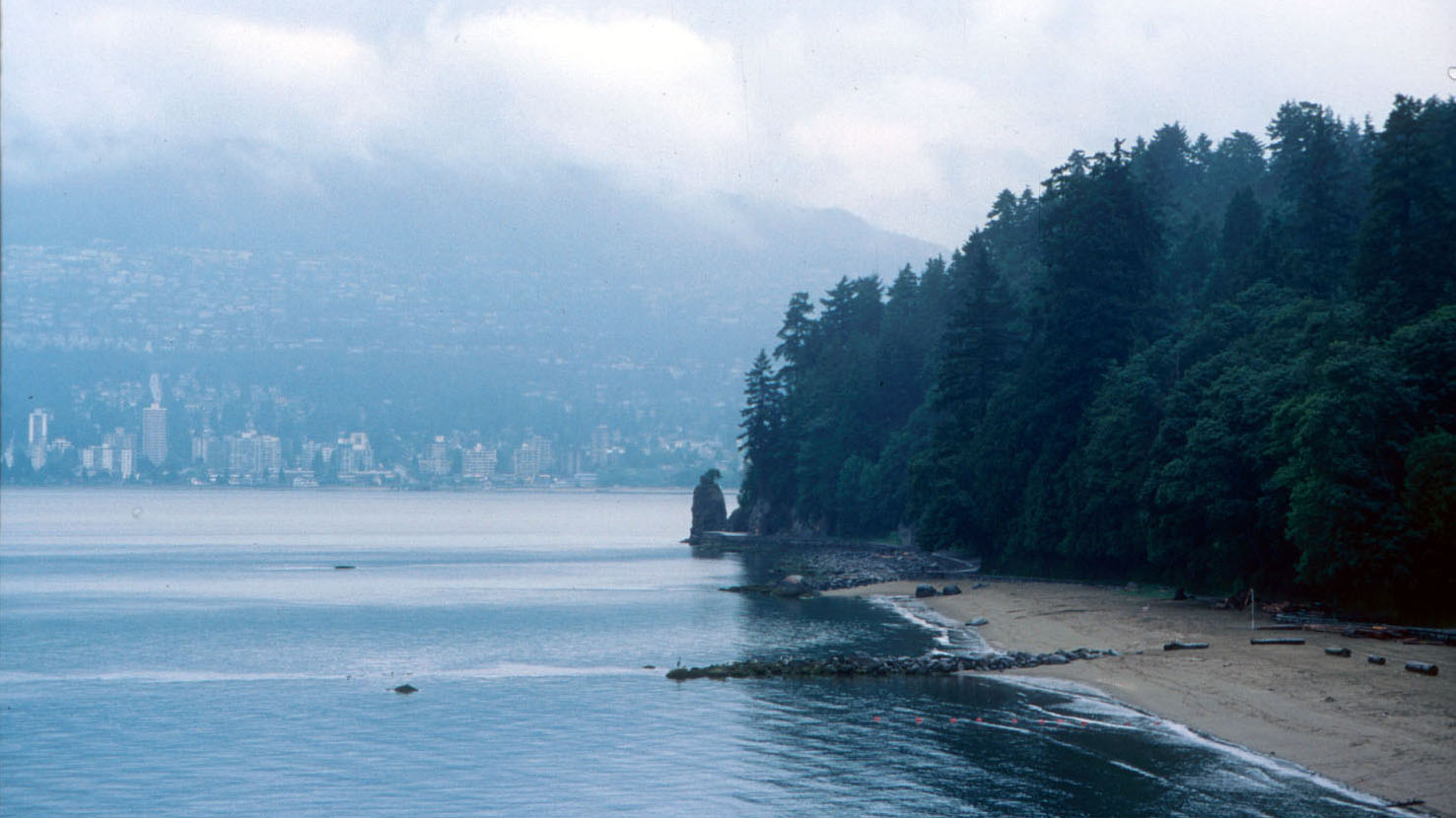
- Directed by: Rob Turner
- Written by: Rodney Gibbons
- Produced by: Robert K. Maclean
- Starring: Adam Hann-Byrd; Joshua Jackson; Barbara Williams; Timothy Bottoms; Olympia Dukakis; Leslie Nielsen
- Cinematography: Michael Buckley
- Edited by: Michael Chandler
- Music by: Todd Boekelheide
- Production companies: Circle Northwood; Westcom Entertainment Group
- Distributed by: Skouras Pictures
- Release dates: September 30, 1993 (U.S.); April 22, 1994 (Canada)
- Running time: 95 minutes
- Country: Canada
- Language: English

Digger is a Canadian comedy-drama film, directed by Rob Turner and released in 1993.

== Plot ==
Digger (Adam Hann-Byrd), a 12-year old boy, is sent to live with his aunt Anna (Barbara Williams) and uncle Sam (Timothy Bottoms) when his parents break up. He befriends Billy (Joshua Jackson), a dying boy who has an eerie connection with nature, while his widowed grandmother Bea (Olympia Dukakis) enters a new romance with Arthur (Leslie Nielsen).

== Cast ==
- Adam Hann-Byrd as Digger
- Joshua Jackson as Billy
- Timothy Bottoms as Sam Corlett
- Barbara Williams as Anna Corlett
- Olympia Dukakis as Bea
- Leslie Nielsen as Arthur Evrensel

== Production ==
The film was shot in British Columbia in fall 1992. The screenplay was based on the real childhood experiences of writer Rodney Gibbons. It was originally set in the Isle of Man, Gibbons' childhood home, but the setting was ultimately changed to British Columbia's Gulf Islands.

== Release ==
The film premiered on September 30, 1993, as the opening film of the Vancouver International Film Festival, before opening commercially on April 22, 1994.

== Critical response ==
Michael Reid of the Victoria Times-Colonist praised the film's cast and cinematography, but called the film a "downer" that didn't have "enough action to hold our interest en route to the summary of life's lessons."

Peter Birnie of the Vancouver Sun wrote that "while Digger is that rare find, a family movie filled with positive values, it's also paced so slowly that kids could get bored. The script by Rodney Gibbons is guilty of making too much of the metaphysics between the boys, leading us in ethereal directions when what's needed is a stronger plotline."

== Awards ==
The film received two Genie Award nominations at the 14th Genie Awards in 1994:

- Best Art Direction/Production Design: Mark S. Freeborn
- Best Original Score: Todd Boekelheide
