= Halloween H20: 20 Years Later =

1998 film by Steve Miner

- Theatrical release poster
- Directed by: Steve Miner
- Screenplay by: Robert Zappia; Matt Greenberg
- Story by: Robert Zappia
- Based on: Characters created by Debra Hill; John Carpenter
- Produced by: Paul Freeman
- Starring: Jamie Lee Curtis; Adam Arkin; Michelle Williams; Adam Hann-Byrd; Jodi Lyn O'Keefe; Janet Leigh; Josh Hartnett; LL Cool J; Joseph Gordon-Levitt
- Cinematography: Daryn Okada
- Edited by: Patrick Lussier
- Music by: John Ottman; Marco Beltrami
- Production companies: Nightfall Productions; Trancas International
- Distributed by: Dimension Films
- Release dates: July 27, 1998 (Los Angeles); August 5, 1998 (United States)
- Running time: 86 minutes
- Country: United States
- Language: English
- Budget: $17 million
- Box office: $75 million

Halloween H20: 20 Years Later (or Halloween H20: Twenty Years Later) is a 1998 American slasher film directed by Steve Miner, and starring Jamie Lee Curtis, Adam Arkin, Michelle Williams, Adam Hann-Byrd, Jodi Lyn O'Keefe, Janet Leigh, LL Cool J, Joseph Gordon-Levitt, and Josh Hartnett in his film debut. It is the seventh installment in the Halloween franchise and a sequel to Halloween (1978) and Halloween II (1981), ignoring the Thorn Trilogy story arc of the previous three installments. It follows a post-traumatic Laurie Strode, who has faked her death in order to go into hiding from her murderous brother, Michael Myers, who finds her working at a private boarding school in California.

Halloween H20 was released in the United States on August 5, 1998. The film received mixed reviews from critics, with many saying it was at that point the best of the sequels but still paled compared to the original. It grossed $75 million worldwide against a budget of $17 million, making it the fifth highest-grossing film in the franchise. A sequel, Halloween: Resurrection, was released in 2002.

== Plot ==
It has been twenty years since Michael Myers escaped from Smith's Grove and returned to his hometown of Haddonfield to kill his long-lost sister, Laurie Strode. (Note: As depicted in both Halloween (1978) and Halloween II (1981)) After an explosion at Haddonfield Memorial Hospital caused by Dr. Sam Loomis, Michael's body disappeared and was presumed dead.

On October 29, 1998, Marion Wittington (née Chambers), Loomis' former colleague who took care of him until his death, returns home to the house they shared in Langdon, Illinois, only to find that it has been broken into, discovering that the file on Laurie Strode is missing. Marion seeks help from her teenage neighbor, Jimmy, before he and his friend, Tony, are killed by Michael, who slashes Marion's throat. Michael drives away in Jimmy's car, as the police arrive on scene.

In Summer Glen, California, Laurie lives under the identity of "Keri Tate", having faked her death to stay hidden from Michael. She lives with her son, John, and is the headmistress of Hillcrest Academy, a private boarding school, where she is supported by her secretary, Norma Watson, and guidance counselor Will Brennan, with whom she is in a relationship. Despite the new life she has built for herself, her traumatic encounters with Michael cause her to suffer from chronic nightmares and become an alcoholic, living in fear that her brother will one day find her. Back at the academy, most of the faculty and students are preparing to leave for a trip to Yosemite. Laurie has forbidden John to go, worried that something will happen to him.

Meanwhile, Michael, having gotten a flat tire, is forced to steal another vehicle from a woman and her daughter who stop by a highway rest area leaving them unharmed but stranded. When John and his friend Charlie Deveraux sneak off of campus, Laurie has a heated argument with John about how her fears affect his life. John's girlfriend, Molly Cartwell, is also unable to attend, prompting Charlie and his girlfriend Sarah Wainthorpe to forego the trip so that they can all have a Halloween party on campus. Reflecting on their argument, Laurie changes her mind about not letting John go on the trip, though he ultimately decides to remain behind with Molly, Charlie, and Sarah, unbeknownst to his mother.

After most of the teachers and students have departed, security guard Ronny Jones spots and investigates Michael's stolen truck at the main gate, inadvertently letting Michael sneak onto the campus. Following Norma's advice, Laurie reveals her true identity to Will, before reflecting that John is now the same age she was when Michael first came after her. Attempting to call John, she discovers the phones are down and that he never left campus. Laurie joins Will and Ronny to search for John and his friends, while Michael kills Charlie and Sarah. Molly and John barely escape, before reaching Laurie, who comes face to face with her brother for the first time in twenty years.

Will accidentally shoots Ronny, mistaking his shadow for Michael, before Laurie witnesses Michael kill Will himself. Laurie, John and Molly make a run for her truck, but knowing that Michael will never stop hunting her, Laurie decides to face him, arming herself with an axe. Stalking each other throughout the campus, Laurie stabs Michael several times and shoves him off a balcony through a table in the cafeteria below. Before Laurie can finish him off, Ronny, who survived being shot, stops her, believing Michael to be dead.

The authorities arrive a short time later and the entire school becomes a crime scene. Michael's supposed dead body is loaded into a coroner's van, but Laurie suspects he is still alive. Predicting Michael's tricky nature, she grabs her axe and hijacks the van to kill Michael for good. When he awakens and breaks out of the body bag, Laurie slams on the brakes sending him crashing through the windshield and down an embankment. Laurie then rams the van into him, pinning him down to a downed tree. Laurie approaches and calls out to Michael, staring him down for a moment of pity. He reaches towards her and Laurie reaches toward him; Laurie then decapitates him with the axe. As sirens approach from the distance, Laurie sighs in relief.

== Cast ==
- Jamie Lee Curtis as Laurie Strode/Keri Tate
- Josh Hartnett as John Tate
- Adam Arkin as Will Brennan
- Michelle Williams as Molly Cartwell
- Adam Hann-Byrd as Charlie Deveraux
- Jodi Lyn O'Keefe as Sarah Wainthrope
- Janet Leigh as Norma Watson
- LL Cool J as Ronald 'Ronny' Jones
- Chris Durand as Michael Myers
- Nancy Stephens as Marion Chambers-Whittington
- Joseph Gordon-Levitt as Jimmy Howell
- Branden Williams as Tony Alegre
- Beau Billingslea as Detective Fitzsimmons
- Matt Winston as Matt Sampson
- Larisa Miller as Claudia
- Emmalee Thompson as Casey
- Tom Kane as Dr. Sam Loomis (voice)
- Lisa Gay Hamilton as Shirley 'Shirl' Jones (voice)

== Production ==
The original idea for the seventh Halloween film began as the second half of the treatment written by Daniel Farrands during pre-production of Halloween: The Curse of Michael Myers, which he later submitted as a new treatment entitled Michael Myers: Lord of the Dead. The story would have opened immediately after the events of the previous film and involved Tommy Doyle discovering that the entire town of Haddonfield was involved in a conspiracy to control Michael Myers. Farrands compared the story to The Wicker Man, The Hitcher, Rosemary's Baby, Shirley Jackson's "The Lottery," and Dennis Etchison's rejected screenplay for Halloween 4: The Return of Michael Myers. Farrands later decided not to continue with the series "since I honestly could not bear to watch another one of my scripts turned into a debacle – especially another Halloween."

Another idea pitched after the Farrands treatment was Halloween 7: Two Faces of Evil, written by Robert Zappia. Originally intended to be a direct-to-video film, this would have involved Michael Myers stalking an all women's boarding school. The plot eventually also revealed a copycat killer, causing many fans to compare such a twist to The Silence of the Lambs. The pitch itself was changed a couple of times, changing the title to Halloween: Blood Ties as they brought Laurie Strode into the storyline, before scrapping the idea entirely.

The screenplay was based on a story by Kevin Williamson, with the original working title for the film being Halloween 7: The Revenge of Laurie Strode. Williamson was initially hired to write a script, and the story was to be a sequel to the previous six films, thereby keeping the timeline's continuity.

When Williamson first outlined Halloween H20, he created the storyline in which Laurie Strode has faked her own death and taken on a new identity as a specific way of retconning the character's death in Halloween 4. In Williamson's original treatment, there are scenes in which a Hillcrest student does a report on Michael Myers' killing spree, mentioning the death of Jamie, complete with flashbacks to 4–6 mentioned in the text. "Keri"/Laurie responds to hearing the student's report on the death of her daughter by going into a restroom and throwing up.

In the film, the voice of Dr. Loomis is heard giving the same speech that he gave to Sheriff Brackett when they were inside Michael's abandoned childhood home in the original film. The original monologue from Halloween was initially considered for direct sampling, but was unable to be separated from the preexisting soundtrack. As a result, instead of the voice of Donald Pleasence himself, sound-alike voice actor Tom Kane provides this voice-over.

John Carpenter was originally in consideration to be the director for this particular follow-up since Curtis wanted to reunite the cast and crew of the original to have active involvement in it. It was believed that Carpenter opted out because he wanted no active part in the sequel; however, this is not the case. Carpenter agreed to direct the film, but his starting fee as director was $10 million, so he demanded a three-picture deal with Dimension Films. Carpenter's bargain was denied by the Weinsteins, and therefore no deal took place. Carpenter rationalized this by believing the hefty fee was compensation for revenue he had never received from the original Halloween, a matter that was still a contention between Carpenter and Halloween producer Moustapha Akkad even after twenty years. When Akkad balked at Carpenter's fee, Carpenter quit the project and therefore refused to continue his involvement once again. Steve Miner was hired to replace him. Curtis later regretted doing the film, saying in a 2018 interview: "Now, to this day, I regret that I didn't say to everyone, if Debra Hill's not the one producing this movie, I'm not doing it".

Scream writer/producer Kevin Williamson was involved in various areas of production. Although not directly credited, he provided rewrites in character dialogue and helped make alterations and sketches of the script. He also came up with the paramedic storyline that explained how Michael survived the ending, which was partially filmed the day after principal photography ended and later utilized in the film's sequel. The writers of Halloween H20 were left with a dilemma when Curtis wanted to end the series, but Moustapha Akkad had a clause that legally wouldn't allow the writers to kill Michael Myers off. According to the Blu-ray released by Scream Factory, Curtis almost left the project just weeks before filming, until Kevin Williamson came up with the paramedic storyline and presented it to Akkad. Curtis finally agreed to be a part of the film under the condition that no footage hinting toward a sequel would be presented by the film, and that the audience would believe that Michael was dead until the inevitable sequel was announced. Halloween: Resurrection's first shot of Michael in the paramedic uniform was filmed the day after H20's principal photography ended, according to H20's editor, Patrick Lussier.

The film features an in memoriam tribute to Donald Pleasence in the closing credits, but misspells his last name as "Pleasance."

=== Filming ===
Filming began on February 18, 1998 and ended on April 20, 1998. The filming location of the Hillcrest Academy private school was filmed at the Canfield-Moreno Estate located at 1923 Micheltorena St. in Silver Lake, Los Angeles. Marion Chambers's house along with Jimmy Howell's house was filmed in Melrose Hill, Los Angeles. The town of Summer Glen was filmed in La Puente, California. The Hillcrest Academy entrance was filmed in Chatsworth, Los Angeles. The ending of the film was filmed in Canoga Park, Los Angeles.

=== Music ===
The original music score was composed by John Ottman, but some music from Scream was added to the chase scenes later on during post-production. Ottman expressed some displeasure about this action in an interview featured on the Halloween: 25 Years of Terror DVD released in 2006. Ottman's score was supplemented with Marco Beltrami's scores from Scream, Scream 2, and Mimic by a team of music editors as well as new cues written by Beltrami during the final days of sound mixing on the film. Dimension Films chief Bob Weinstein demanded musical changes after being dissatisfied with Ottman's score, instating the song "What's This Life For" by rock music group Creed, which is featured in the film during a party sequence and also during the end credits.

In addition, a small tribute to Bernard Herrmann's score from Psycho can be heard as Janet Leigh's character Norma Watson walks to her car (the same model car her character in Psycho drove) before leaving work for the day.

No official soundtrack was ever released for the film, but a compilation album by Ottman was released in the United States and Germany under the Varèse Sarabande label and includes the original score by Ottman and numerous other cuts.

All music is composed by John Ottman.

Portrait of Terror
No.	Title	Length
1.	"Main Title" (Includes Halloween theme by John Carpenter)	4:26
2.	"Laurie"	2:13
3.	"Narrow Escape"	1:56
4.	"Advice"	1:37
5.	"Rest Stop"	1:39
6.	"Disposal"	3:07
7.	"The Evening Begins"	2:15
8.	"Seventeen"	5:09
9.	"Face to Face"	6:00
10.	"Letting Go"	1:00
11.	"Here's Company"	4:11
12.	"Sonata for Molly"	1:59
13.	"Death of a Nurse"	3:55
14.	"Final Confrontation"	4:31
15.	"He's Dead"	1:50
16.	"Road Trip"	2:02
17.	"Farewell, Michael"	2:52
Total length:		50:44

== Alternate television version ==
In February 2003, the FX network premiered an alternate version of the film, adding and extending footage not seen in the original release. It has yet to be released anywhere else, but the deleted scenes can be found on YouTube.

== Reception ==
=== Box office ===
Until the release of Halloween in 2018, Halloween H20 was the highest-grossing film in the Halloween franchise. It made $16.2 million during its opening weekend. With approximately 11,735,978 tickets sold during its initial theatrical run, it remains the third most-attended film in the franchise and sold more tickets than the previous three films combined.

The film also had a gross of €3.2 million in Germany (equivalent to $3.5 million). Internationally it grossed $20 million for a worldwide total of $75 million.

=== Critical response ===
On the review aggregator website Rotten Tomatoes, 54% of 69 critics' reviews are positive, with an average rating of 5.6/10. The website's consensus reads: "Halloween: H20 is the best of the many sequels, yet still pales in comparison to the original Halloween." On Metacritic, the film has a weighted average score of 52 out of 100, based on 20 critics, indicating "mixed or average" reviews. Audiences polled by CinemaScore gave the film an average grade of "B−" on an A+ to F scale.

Roger Ebert of the Chicago Sun-Times awarded the film two out of four stars, while Lawrence Van Gelder of The New York Times wrote that "the throwaway jokes are few and far between, and after a pre-title sequence reintroduces Michael and shows just how far up suspense and thrills can be ratcheted, Halloween H20 declines into the routine," adding: "Nobody is going to be surprised by who lives and who dies." Bob Graham of the San Francisco Chronicle praised the film's referentiality, as well as Curtis's performance, writing: "Slasher films often seem merely a joke, and with good reason, but in this case that's too bad. Curtis, with her plain, unglamorous appearance, rises to the occasion and delivers as compelling a performance as any this summer." Writing for the Austin Chronicle, Marc Savlov said of the film: "Miner strives to imbue the film with the requisite autumnal haze of the original but then gives up midway through and instead resorts to the standard stalk 'n' slash formulas. It's heartening to see a beloved character revived like this (at one point during the screening I attended, audience members actually stood up and cheered), but H20—for all its good, gory intentions—is barely a shadow of the original."

=== Accolades ===
At the 25th Saturn Awards, the movie received nominations for Best Horror Film and Best Actress (Jamie Lee Curtis). Curtis also won Fangoria Chainsaw Award for her portrayal of Laurie Strode. At the 1999 Blockbuster Entertainment Awards, Halloween H20 received four nominations in the acting categories: Favorite Actress — Horror (Curtis), Favorite Actor — Horror (Adam Arkin), Favorite Male Newcomer (Josh Hartnett), and Favorite Supporting Actor — Horror (LL Cool J).

== Home media ==
Halloween H20 was released on VHS and LaserDisc by Buena Vista Home Video. In the United Kingdom, the film was released on VHS on December 15, 1998.

The film was first released on DVD by Dimension Films on October 19, 1999 as part of the "Dimension Collector's Series". It was released in the UK on October 22, 2001 and re-released on April 25, 2011. It was also released in the UK in 2004 as part of the complete collection consisting of the first eight films, a set that is now out of print.

Halloween H20 was released in Canada on Blu-ray by Alliance along with Halloween: The Curse of Michael Myers and Halloween: Resurrection on January 12, 2010.

In 2005, Dimension was sold by Disney, with Disney then selling off the parent label Miramax in December 2010. Miramax and the rights to the pre-October 2005 library of Dimension were subsequently taken over by private equity firm Filmyard Holdings that same year. Filmyard sublicensed the film's home video rights to Echo Bridge Entertainment, who reissued several other Dimension and Miramax titles. On May 3, 2011 it was released on Blu-ray by Echo Bridge Home Entertainment in the US but with an open matte 16:9 transfer, rather than the theatrical aspect ratio of 2.35:1. Its sound was downmixed to stereo, rather than the 5.1 theatrical mix. The Blu-ray received negative reviews, with Blu-ray.com calling it "a mess on every level". It was re-released in the US on DVD by Echo Bridge Home Entertainment on April 26, 2011; this release also does not contain its original aspect ratio of 2.35:1, but rather a 1.66:1 widescreen transfer. Echo Bridge later re-released the film in a triple feature set with Halloween: The Curse of Michael Myers and Halloween: Resurrection. It was also released along with Halloween: The Curse of Michael Myers in one Blu-ray collection.

It was released again on Blu-ray on September 23, 2014 in its original theatrical 2.35:1 aspect ratio and with 5.1 DTS-HD Master Audio in the Halloween: The Complete Collection box set from Anchor Bay Entertainment, with a disc produced by Shout! Factory (under their Scream Factory label), featuring a new commentary with Jamie Lee Curtis and Steve Miner and extra features including behind the scenes footage and archival interviews not seen on any other release. The Scream Factory disc was produced under license from Filmyard, although most of the films in this box set were not owned by Filmyard.

Filmyard sold Miramax and the pre-October 2005 Dimension library to Qatari company beIN Media Group during March 2016. In April 2020, ViacomCBS (now known as Paramount Skydance) acquired the rights to Miramax's library and Dimension's pre-October 2005 library, after buying a 49% stake in Miramax from beIN. The film was made available on their streaming service Paramount+, and in 2021, Paramount Home Entertainment reissued the film on DVD, along with many other Dimension/Miramax titles they had acquired.

On October 4, 2022, Halloween H20 was released by Scream Factory on 4K UHD under license from Paramount, as part of a 4K/Blu-ray box set featuring two other Paramount-owned Halloween films (Halloween: The Curse of Michael Myers and Halloween: Resurrection). on September 25, 2023, the individual film was released in a 4K UHD steelbook by Paramount Home Entertainment.

== See also ==
- List of films set around Halloween
