= Carlo Gabriel Nero =

Italian-British filmmaker

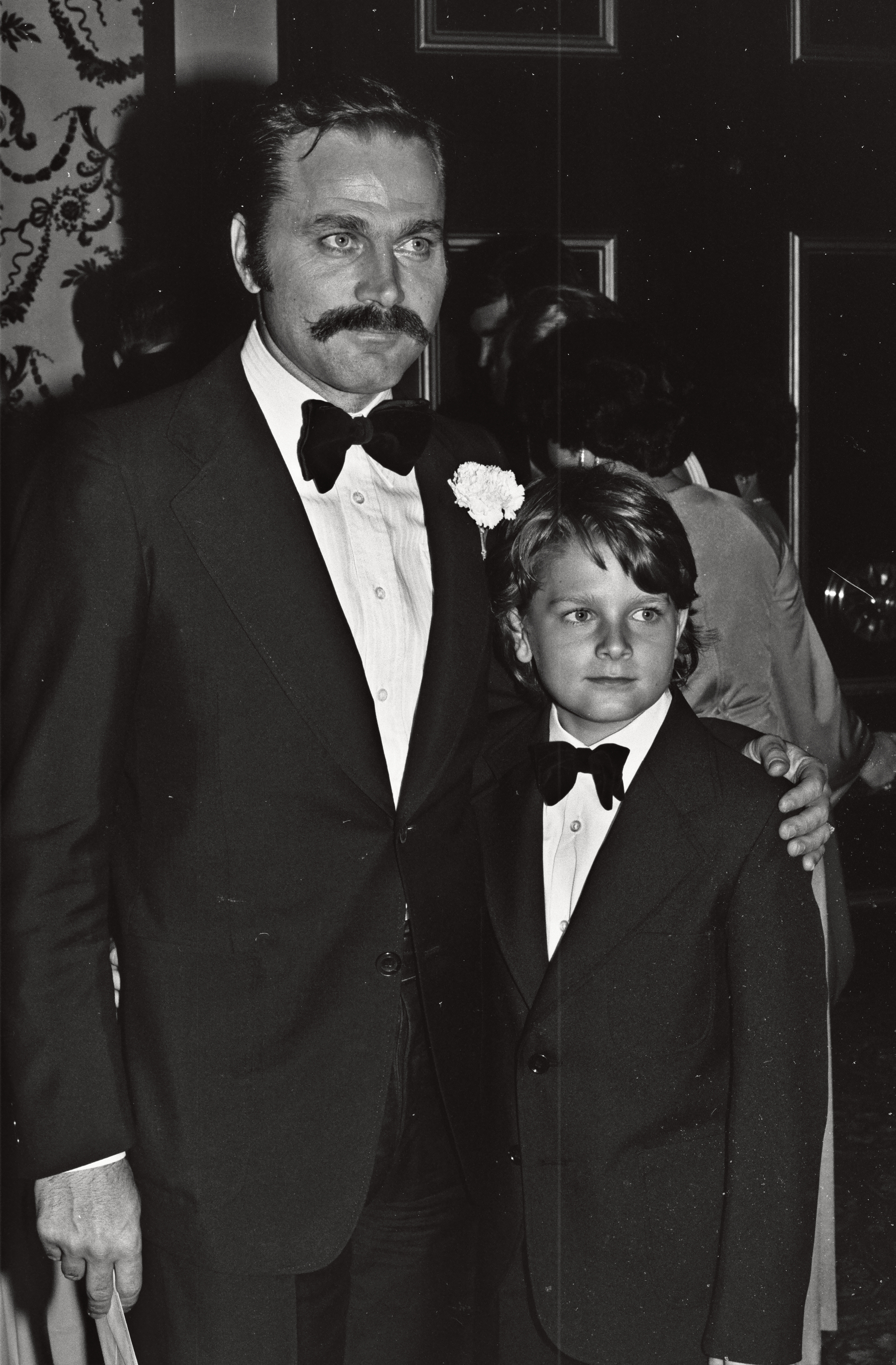
- Nero with his father Franco in 1979
- Born: Carlo Gabriel Sparanero; 16 September 1969 (age 56); London, England
- Occupations: Screenwriter; director; producer
- Years active: 1980–present
- Spouse: Jennifer Wiltsie
- Children: 3
- Parent(s): Franco Nero; Vanessa Redgrave
- Relatives: Joely Richardson (half-sister); Natasha Richardson (half-sister)
- Family: Redgrave

Carlo Gabriel Redgrave Nero (born Sparanero, 16 September 1969) is an Italian-British screenwriter, film director and producer.

== Biography ==
The son of actors Franco Nero and Vanessa Redgrave, his half-sisters are actresses Joely Richardson and Natasha Richardson (1963–2009).

Nero is the nephew of actors Corin (1939–2010) and Lynn Redgrave (1943–2010), cousin to actress Jemma Redgrave, and the uncle of Micheál Richardson and Daisy Bevan.

When Nero was about two years old, his parents separated. Consequently, he divided his childhood between Italy with his father and London with his mother.

Nero graduated from the Italian National Film School in Rome – Centro Sperimentale di Cinematografia, and furthered his film studies at the New York University Film School. Vanessa Redgrave said in a 2016 interview with The Times, "It's no surprise that Carlo has ended up in the film business; he just happens to prefer being on the other side of the camera."

In 1999, Nero's first feature film as writer/director, Uninvited, was released. The film, adapted from James Gabriel Berman's book of the same name, was screened at numerous international film festivals, including Cannes.

Nero directed his mother Vanessa Redgrave, Angelina Jolie, and his sister Joely Richardson, in the 2004 HBO film, The Fever. The film was adapted by a play written by actor Wallace Shawn.

In 2005, Nero established a production company Dissent Projects Ltd. with his mother to produce social and environmental documentaries.

In June 2024, principal photography was completed on The Estate, (Note: The Estate is described as a "social thriller" in the Deadline Hollywood article.) a feature drama, executive produced by Nero, Vanessa Redgrave, and Franco Nero. The film is written and directed by Nero, and stars his mother and father. The Estate also features Nero's wife, actress Jennifer Wiltsie and daughter Lillian Nero.

== Selected filmography ==
- Larry's Visit (1996) (Note: Larry's Visit is a 24 minute drama. "A wealthy businessman's heterosexual life is threatened by a visit from his male prep school lover," as per Letterboxd) – director/writer
- Il Tocco/ The Touch (1997) (Note: Il Tocco is an Italian feature length crime action drama featuring Carlo's father, Franco) – co-writer
- Uninvited (1999) – director/writer/co-producer
- The Fever (2004) – director/co-writer/co-executive producer
- Wake Up World (2006) (Note: Wake Up World "highlights what UNICEF (United Nations Children's Fund) can and must do to meet the desperate needs of children and teenagers all over the world," as per Brooklyn Film Festival synopsis.) – documentary director
- Bosnia Rising (2014) – documentary director
- Eyes of St. John (2016) (Note: Eyes of St. John is a documentary about the medical team providing, and their patients receiving essential eye care from a hospital in East Jerusalem.) – documentary director/writer/co-producer
- Sea Sorrow (2017) – documentary producer (directed by Vanessa Redgrave)

== Discography ==
- 1985 – Will Change The World /Cambierà (Lovers, LVNP 802, 7" – with his father, the Italian actor Franco Nero)

== Awards ==
- 1995: Columbus International Film and Video Festival: Bronze Plaque, Larry's Visit
- circa 1999: Tbilisi International Film Festival: Young Artists Award, Uninvited
- 2005: Bratislava International Film Festival: Grand Prix: The Fever: Nominated
- 2015: Best Shorts Competition, Award of Excellence: Eyes of St John
- 2016: London International Short Film Festival, Best International Documentary Short: Eyes of St. John
- 2016: The Global Film Awards, Humanitarian Award: Eyes of St. John
