= John Michael Phillips =

American lawyer, consumer and civil rights advocate

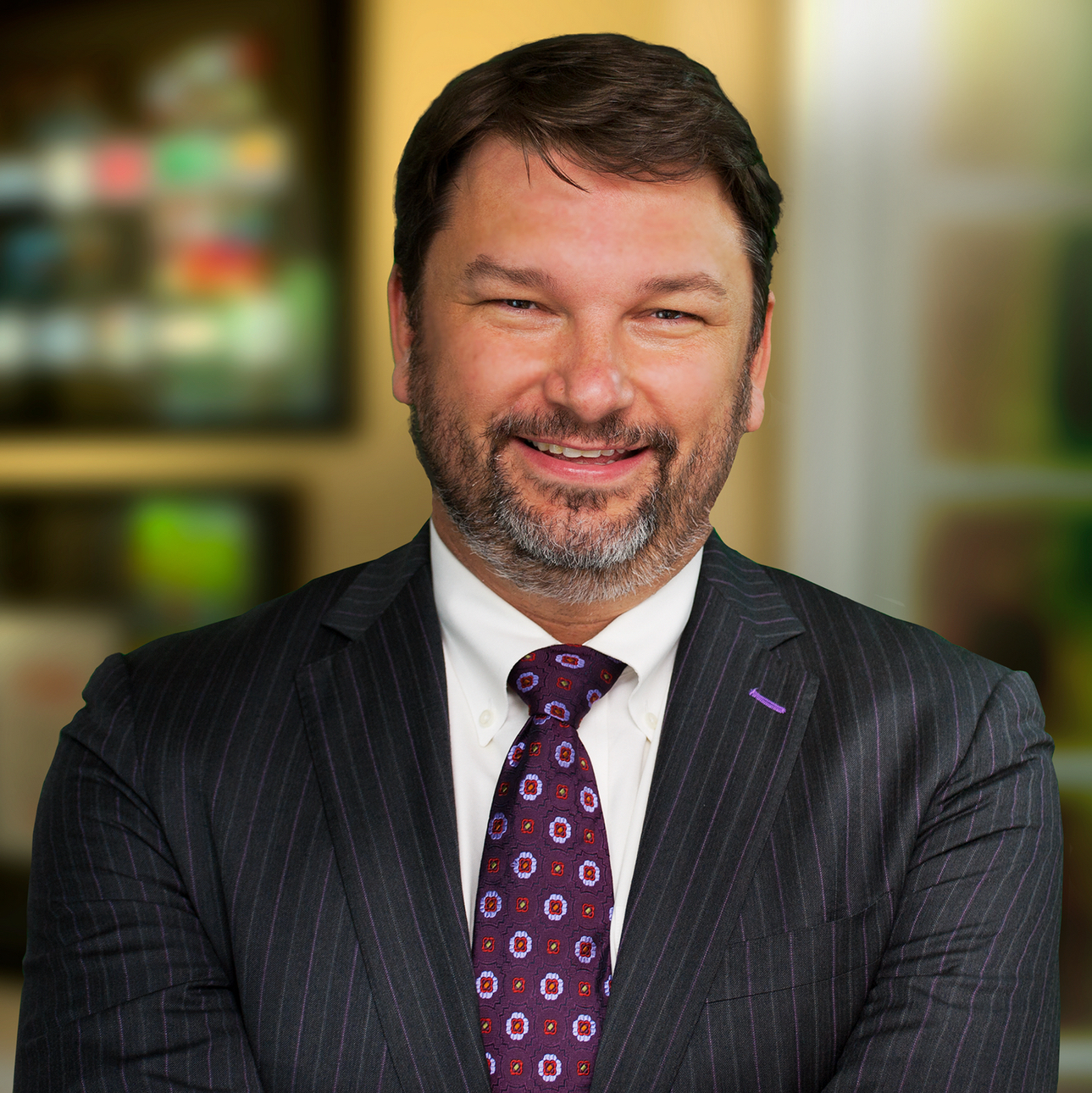
- Phillips in 2016
- Born: February 4, 1975 (age 51); Mobile, Alabama
- Education: University of Alabama, University of Alabama School of Law
- Occupations: Attorney; news personality; speaker; publisher
- Known for: Tiger King

John Michael Phillips (born February 4, 1975) is an American lawyer and a legal commentator. He is licensed to practice law in Florida, New York, Georgia, Alabama, Texas, Oklahoma, Illinois and Washington, DC. Phillips has been lead counsel in numerous nationally reported cases. He represented U.S. Congresswoman Lucy McBath and Ron Davis after the Murder of Jordan Davis in Jacksonville, Florida. He prevailed as lead counsel for Omarosa Manigault Newman in litigation filed against her by Donald Trump As a result, the Campaign was assessed Phillips’s legal fees and costs, totaling over $1.3 Million and agreed to invalidate all of the Campaign's NDAs. He was also lead counsel for Joseph Maldonado-Passage, also known as Joe Exotic, from the Netflix show Tiger King. Phillips appears in four episodes of season two of Tiger King.

== Early life and education ==
Phillips was born in Mobile, Alabama. He completed a BA (Political science and Criminal justice, 1997) at the University of Alabama and JD (2000) at the University of Alabama School of Law. He moved to Jacksonville, Florida in 2001.

== Career ==
Phillips started his career as a civil litigation defense attorney, defending companies like Coca-Cola, Hertz, and State Farm from injury claims. After nearly a decade of defense work, he worked alongside John Morgan and represented victims of traumatic injuries. In 2011, he founded his own law office.

Phillips successfully defended the copyright of his client who had created a photograph of prosecutor Angela Corey and George Zimmerman attempted to sell a rendition as a painting. Another notable case includes Gregory Hill v. Ft. Pierce Police Department, where a man was shot by police through his closed garage door. A controversial $4 jury verdict resulted.

In 2012, Phillips was hired by Ron Davis and U.S. Congresswoman Lucy McBath after the shooting of Jordan Davis by Michael Dunn.

=== Tiger King Litigation ===
Phillips was hired in July 2020 to represent the daughters of Don Lewis and his former assistant Anne McQueen. The Lewis daughters sought information from Carole Baskin and others about the disappearance of Don Lewis and the lawsuit was amended concerning defamation toward McQueen. It was pending in 2021. Phillips and his firm were later contacted and retained by Joe Exotic.

=== Donald Trump vs. Omarosa Manigault Newman ===
On August 18, 2018, it was announced that Phillips and his firm were representing Omarosa Manigault Newman in both arbitration and litigation arising out of her employment with Donald Trump.

Phillips defeated Trump and his Campaign's efforts to enforce a nondisclosure agreement against Newman, the former White House aide and a star on “The Apprentice” who wrote a tell-all book about serving in his administration. In the decision by the American Arbitration Association dated September 24, 2021, the Arbitrator granted Respondent’s Summary Judgment Motion declaring the Agreement invalid under New York contract law.

=== Howard S. Schneider pediatric abuse cases ===
Phillips handled the case of Jacksonville pediatric dentist Howard S. Schneider. Howard Schneider was initially charged in a scheme to defraud Medicaid, but also had to answer to allegations of abuse and performing unnecessary dentistry on children. Parents were told the treatment involved one tooth yet he extracted several. Phillips made several televised interviews about it on shows such as Nancy Grace, Nightline, Crime Watch Daily, and others.

=== Record verdict on behalf of Kalil McCoy ===
On January 15, 2019, Phillips and his firm received a jury verdict of $495,123,680.00, the largest known jury verdict in northeast Florida and one of the largest awards for wrongful death in the country. Kalil McCoy, of Jacksonville, Florida, was shot in the head by Frederick Lee Wade, 19, while they rode in a car with four other friends, after an argument about opening a window. McCoy’s friends would dumped her body in a wooded area and lied about what happened.

=== Estate of Christopher “YNW Juvy” Thomas, Jr. versus Jamell "YNW Melly" Demons ===
Christopher Thomas Jr., and Anthony Williams were shot and killed Oct. 26, 2018, in South Florida according to the Miramar Police Department. The men were last seen leaving in a car with Jamell Demons, aka YNW Melly, and Cortlen Henry, aka YNW Bortlen. Miramar police said an investigation concluded that Demons shot and killed Williams and Thomas. Phillips filed a wrongful death lawsuit on behalf of the family of Christopher Thomas, Jr., on Oct. 30 2020. As a result of accepting this case, Phillips states he has been the victim of death threats and harassment.

=== Political life and civic career ===
In 2015, Phillips was nominated by the Mayor of Jacksonville to the City's Human Rights Commission. On November 14, 2017, he resigned from the Commission in order to relieve any perceived conflict before filing multiple civil rights lawsuits against the City of Jacksonville.

== Personal life ==
In June 2020 Phillips was residing in Jacksonville, Florida. He has three sons. He is the owner of the Folio Weekly, a news publication over 40 year-old.
