= Marc Silver =

British filmmaker

Marc Silver is a British filmmaker. He is known for directing Who is Dayani Cristal? (2013), featuring Gael García Bernal, which won a cinematography award at the 2013 Sundance Film Festival, and 3/12 Minutes, 10 Bullets (2015), which won a Special Jury Award at the 2015 Sundance Film Festival.
