= Penmon =

Village in Anglesey, Wales

Coordinates: 53.305833°N 4.056667°W

- Location within Anglesey
- Population: < 1,275
- OS grid reference: SH623802
- Community: Llangoed
- Principal area: Anglesey
- Preserved county: Gwynedd
- Country: Wales
- Sovereign state: United Kingdom
- Post town: BEAUMARIS
- Postcode district: LL58
- Dialling code: 01248
- Police: North Wales
- Fire: North Wales
- Ambulance: Welsh
- UK Parliament: Ynys Môn
- Senedd Cymru – Welsh Parliament: Bangor Conwy Môn

Penmon is a promontory, village and ecclesiastical parish on the eastern tip of the Isle of Anglesey in Wales, about 3 miles (4.8 km) east of the town of Beaumaris. It is in the community of Llangoed. The name comes from Welsh: pen (which can mean "head", "end" or "promontory") and Môn, which is the Welsh name for Anglesey. It is the site of a historic monastery and associated 12th-century church. Walls near the well next to the church may be part of the oldest remaining Christian building in Wales. Penmon also has an award-winning beach and the Anglesey Coastal Path follows its shores. Quarries in Penmon have provided stone for many important buildings and structures, including Birmingham Town Hall and the two bridges that cross the Menai Strait. The area is popular with locals and visitors alike for its monuments, tranquillity, bracing air and fine views of Snowdonia to the south across the Menai Strait.

== History ==
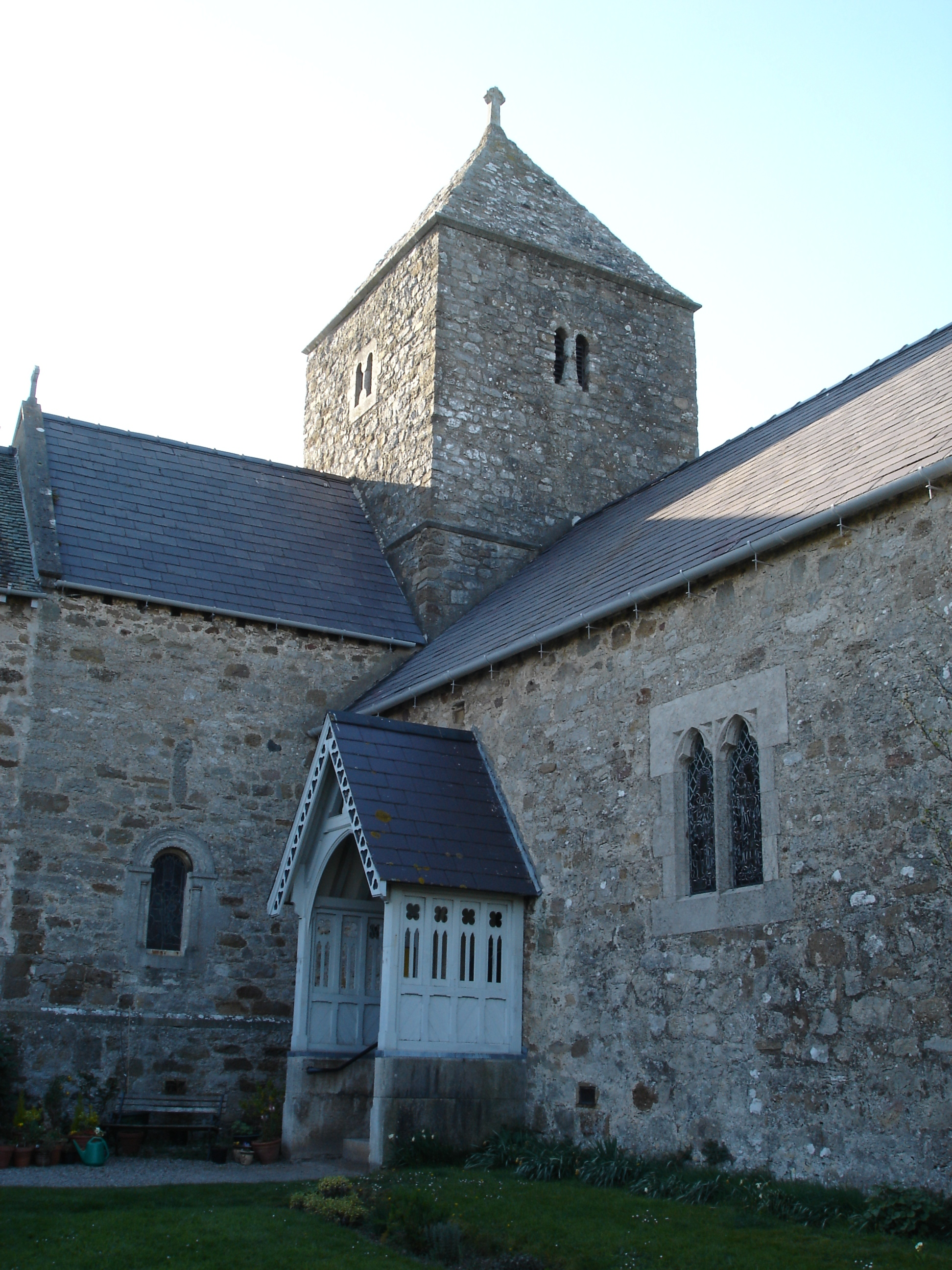
St Seiriol's Church

According to tradition, the community at Penmon grew up around a monastery (clas) established in the early 6th century by Saint Seiriol on land provided by his brother Saint Einion, king of Llŷn. Although Seiriol eventually removed himself to a hermitage on nearby Puffin Island, the monastery prospered and two crosses were set up at its gate. In 971, Vikings destroyed much of Penmon. The two crosses and the decorated font remain from this time. During the 12th century, the abbey church was rebuilt under Gruffudd ap Cynan and Owain Gwynedd. In the 13th century, under Llywelyn ap Iorwerth, monasteries started a newer more regular kind of rule, and Penmon became an Augustinian priory with conventional buildings. The priory expanded. After surviving the conquest of Wales by King Edward, it was eventually dissolved in 1538. The buildings were transferred to the ownership of the Bulkeleys of Beaumaris, a prominent local family, and are still in use today. The Bulkeleys also used most of the land for a deer park, and built the dovecot near the church.

== Climate ==
The average temperature and rainfall figures taken between 1971 and 2000 at the Met Office weather station in Colwyn Bay, around 10 miles east of Penmon (and also by the sea) are set out in the table below. When compared to the corresponding figures for Wales as a whole, the area can be seen to be both warmer and drier than the average location in Wales throughout the whole year.

Month	Jan	Feb	Mar	Apr	May	Jun	Jul	Aug	Sep	Oct	Nov	Dec	Year
Average max. temperature °C	8.2	8.2	9.9	11.5	14.8	17.0	19.3	19.2	17.0	14.1	10.8	9.1	13.3
Average min. temperature °C	2.8	2.6	3.9	5.0	7.3	10.0	12.1	12.1	10.2	7.9	5.3	3.7	6.9
Rainfall mm	76.8	48.0	58.2	46.5	54.3	58.6	43.9	63.4	66.9	90.9	88.9	91.6	788.1
Source: Met Office

== Demographics ==
The author of A History of Anglesey, written in 1775, said of Penmon that there were "plenty of oysters, remarkable large, the poor find constant employ in the dredge, and in pickling the fish for foreign consumption." The population in 1801 was 169. The 1831 census recorded that there were 51 adult males (over 20 years old) and that the majority of residents were labourers or servants, with over half the male adult workers being employed in agriculture. After reaching a high of 291 in 1821, the population declined to a low of 213 in 1871. The population rose thereafter so that it was 300 in 1931.

The Imperial Gazetteer of England and Wales of 1870-2 noted that millstone, good limestone and marble were found in the area. It also recorded that the population was 240 and that there were 53 houses, with the property being "divided among a few". In fact, the number of houses in Penmon did not exceed 60 throughout the 19th century, first reaching 60 in 1901.

At the time of the 2001 census, Llangoed ward (which includes the parish of Penmon) had a population of 1,275. About 60% of residents in the area had been born in Wales, with about 36% having been born in England. About 63% of residents were able to use the Welsh language to some degree. 99.76% of residents identified as White, and 0.24% as Black or Black British. Compared to Anglesey as a whole, Llangoed ward had a lower proportion of residents aged 0–4 years (4.78% compared to 5.4%) and a higher proportion of residents aged 65 or over (25.02% compared to 18.86%). The general health of the population of Llangoed ward was poorer than that of Anglesey generally: 12.47% said that their health was "not good" (Anglesey: 10.53%) and 25.73% reported a "limiting long-term illness" (Anglesey:22.38%).

== Places of interest ==
Penmon has some interesting buildings with histories to match. These buildings (the Priory and church, the dovecot and the well) are close together on the site of the old monastery. There is also an island of note nearby, Puffin Island.

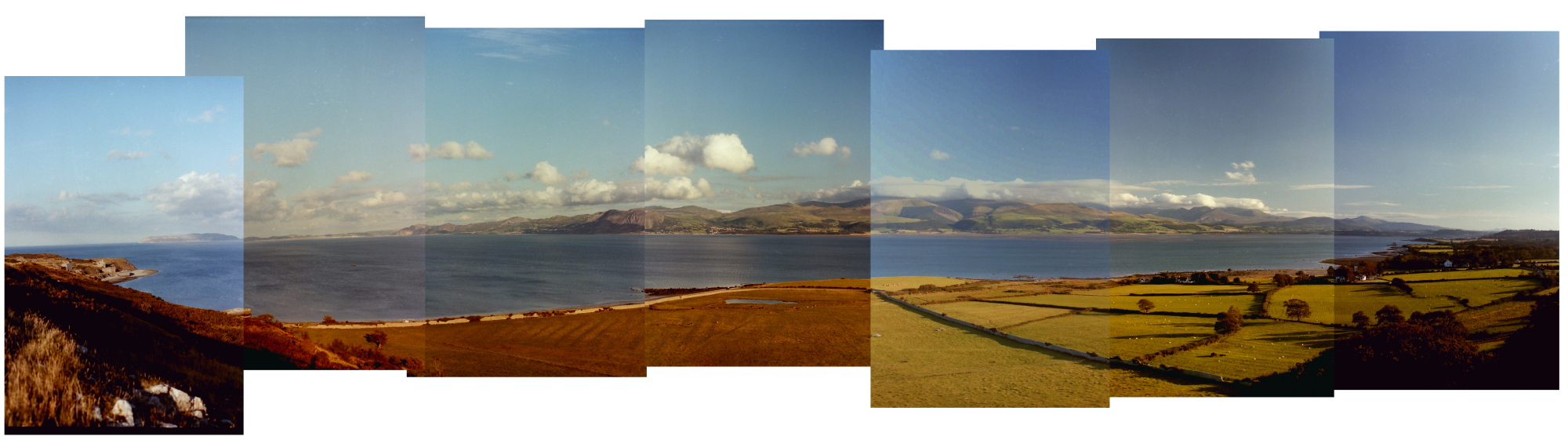
Panorama from Penmon old Deer Park across the Menai Strait with Snowdome in the background.

=== Penmon Priory ===
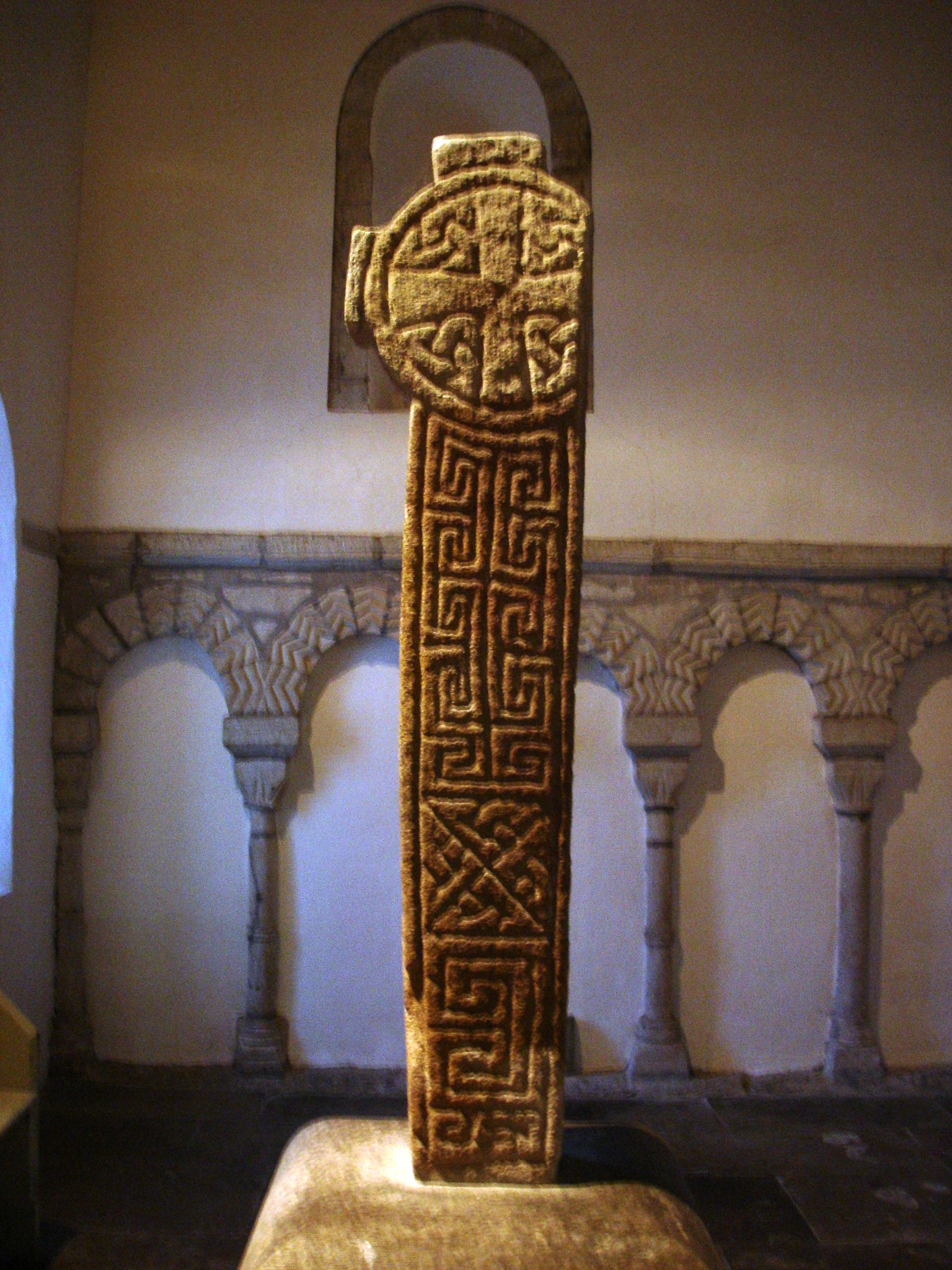
The smaller of the 10th century crosses, with one arm cut off

The monastery (called St Seiriol's monastery) grew in size and had a wooden church building by the 10th century. This wooden building was, however, destroyed in 971 and then rebuilt in the 12th century in stone, from 1120 to 1123. The oldest parts of the Priory Church of St Seiriol date to 1140. It survived the initial Norman invasion of Gwynedd between 1081 and 1100, defended by Prince Gruffudd ap Cynan of Gwynedd. The priory church was enlarged in the early 13th century, at the time of the Augustinian Rule. There are records for the election of Priors in the Calendar of Patent Rolls back to 1306, when one Iowerth the Prior is mentioned. The dining hall was on the first floor, with a cellar below and dormitory above. In the 16th century, a kitchen and a warming house were added at the east of the building. The eastern range of buildings has gone, but the southern one, containing the refectory with a dormitory above, still stands.

Llywelyn Fawr and his successors made the church wealthy, giving it land. This was taken away at the time of the Dissolution of the Monasteries in 1536 but the church survived. The priory was in decline before 1536 in any event, and had only the Prior and two other members at that time.

St Seiriol's Church, which was the centrepiece of the monastery, is now part of the Rectorial benefice of Beaumaris, within the Diocese of Bangor. The church was given a grant by the Welsh Assembly Government of £20,570 in May 2004. This was to repair the leadwork, the rainwater goods, repointing and limewashing of the tower roof and the superstructure of the building. Another building in Penmon, the Priory House (which is set around the cloister court of the church), received £21,600. This was to repair the chimneys, the walls, the windows and the roof of the house. The priory and its refectory are Grade I listed buildings, and the priory complex is a Scheduled monument.

=== Penmon crosses ===
The two medieval crosses that once stood in front of the monastery (from the 10th century) are still in existence today, but are now inside the church. One cross is larger but badly weathered (because it stood outside until 1977, in a deer park). It is almost complete except for about 30 centimetres between the top of the shaft and the head. The other cross is smaller, not as weathered but has an arm of the cross cut off because it was used as a lintel for the refectory windows. It has a modern stone base unlike the other cross.

=== St Seiriol's Well ===
As was often the case with Celtic churches from this period, the church was associated with a well. It was built by the monks of Penmon and was believed to have healing powers by some people visiting it. It is probably one of the oldest buildings in Penmon. It has been said that the lower stone walls near the well were part of Seiriol's church in the 6th century; if so, this would make it the oldest remaining Christian building in Wales. A small chamber surrounds the well. In modern times, water from the well has been used as a symbol of Anglesey by the island's representatives at the launch ceremony of the 10th International Island Games (held in Guernsey in June 2003) and the 11th Island Games (held in the Shetland Islands in July 2005). The well and cell is a Grade I listed structure and a Scheduled monument.

=== Dovecot ===
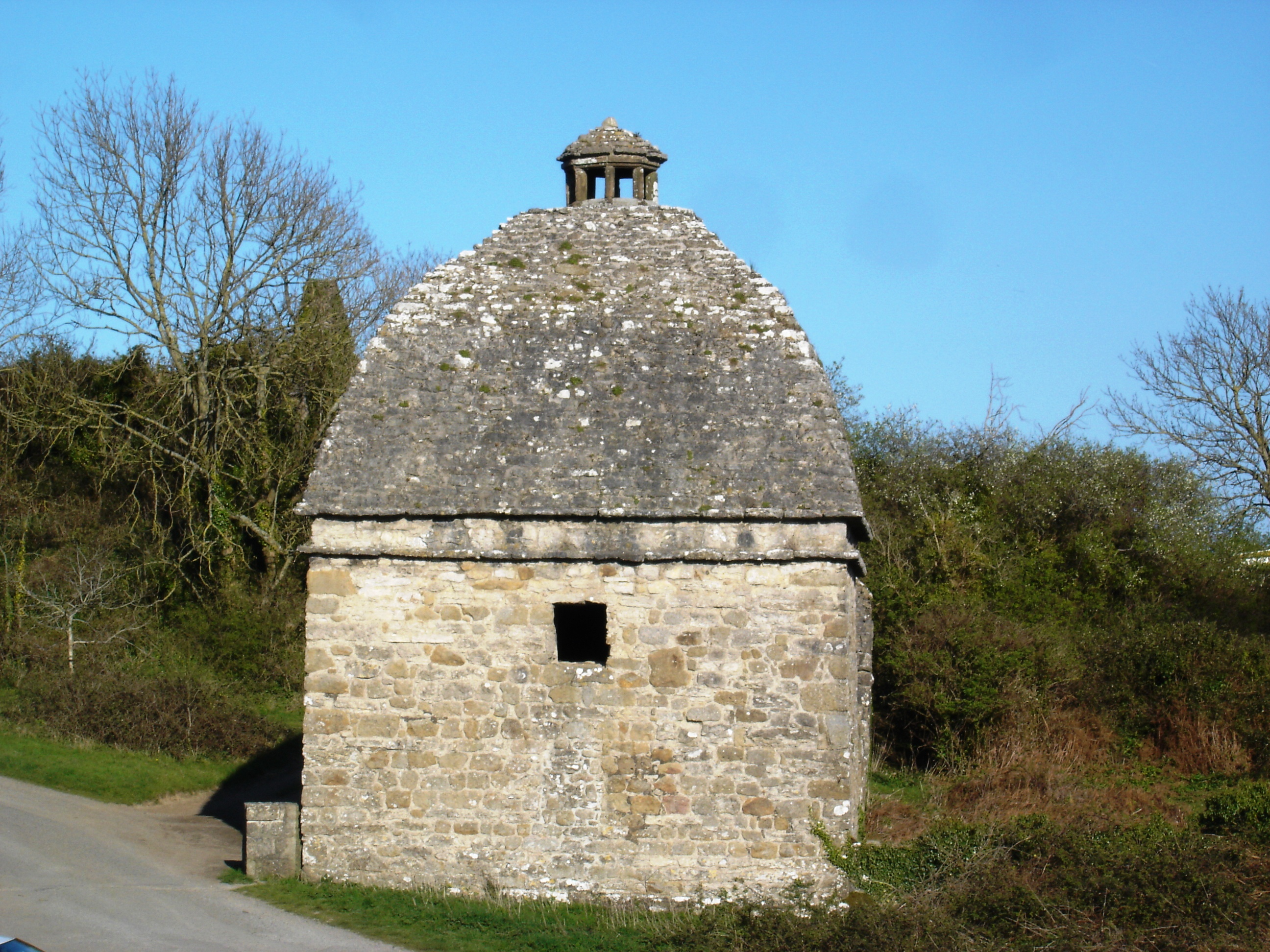
The dovecot

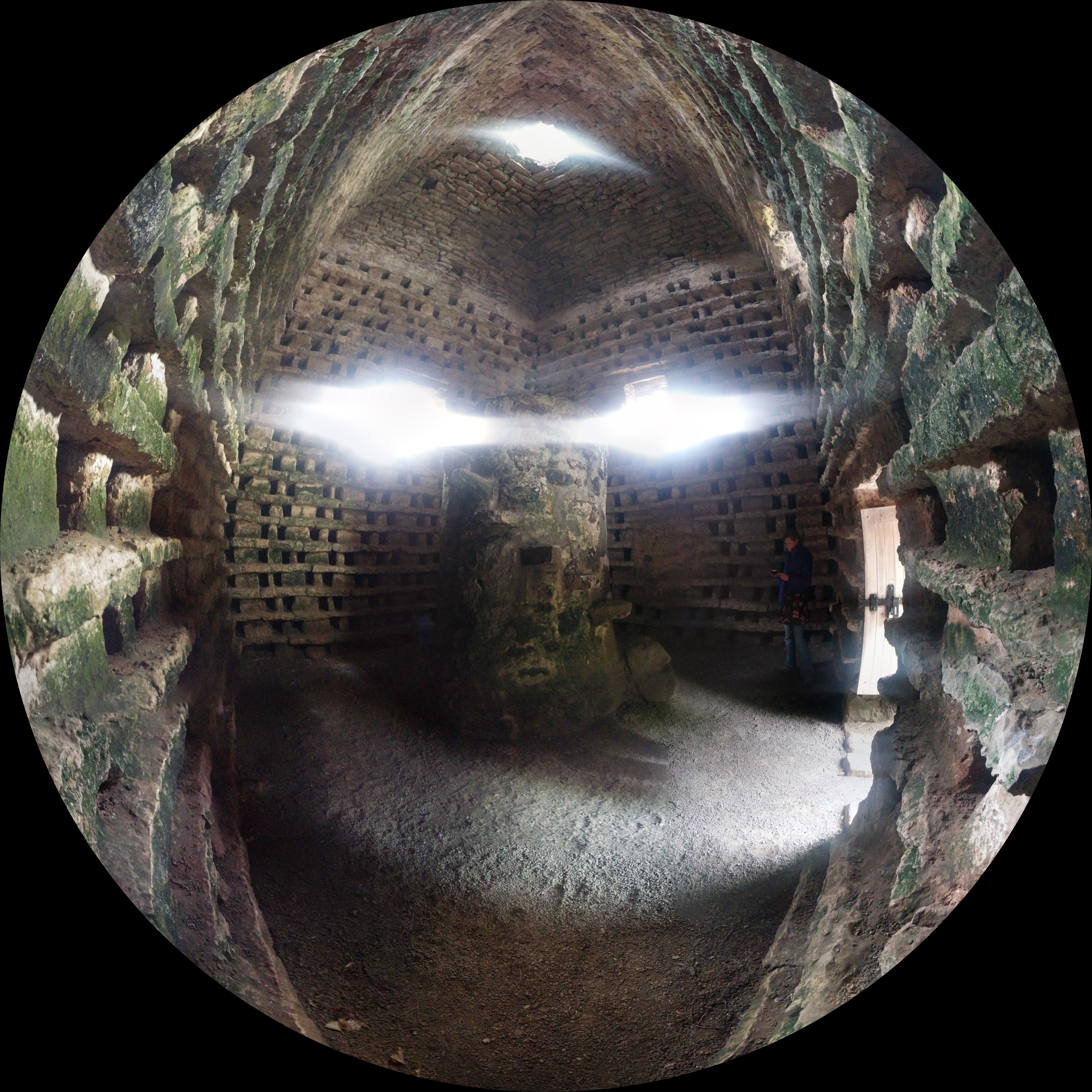
The interior of Penmon Priory Dovecot showing its central pillar

The dovecot (also spelt dovecote) standing near the church was probably built in about 1600, in Elizabethan times, by Sir Richard Bulkeley for housing pigeons for their eggs and meat. It has a large domed roof with a cupola on top so birds could fly in and out. Inside the dovecot were 1,000 nesting boxes, with a pillar in the centre supporting a revolving ladder to provide access to the nesting boxes. The central pillar remains, but the ladder is now gone. The dovecot is a Grade II* listed structure and a Scheduled monument.

=== Puffin Island ===
St Seiriol established a cell and a community on Puffin Island (in Welsh, Ynys Seiriol or Seiriol's Island) half a mile from the coast at the same time as he founded the monastery. There is a tower of a 12th-century church on Puffin Island still. There is a tradition that St Seiriol and perhaps Maelgwn Gwynedd (king of Gwynedd in the first half of the 6th century) were buried there. The island once had large numbers of puffins and guillemots. However, rats reduced the bird population to 40 in the 1890s.

In 1748, Lewis Morris made a hydrographic survey of the coast of Wales and suggested that the tower of the ruined church on the island be converted into a lighthouse. However, this suggestion was not implemented. On 17 August 1831, The Rothesay Castle, a wooden-hulled paddle steamer on a day trip from Liverpool, sank in very heavy seas. Of more than 140 on board, only 23 people survived. Afterwards, the Trwyn Du Lighthouse and a lifeboat station were built to try to prevent similar tragedies. The lifeboat station was closed in 1915 as it had been superseded by a lifeboat at Beaumaris. In its years of operation, the Penmon lifeboats saved at least 143 lives.

=== Beach ===
The beach at Penmon has been awarded a 2006 Seaside Award by the "Keep Wales Tidy" group. To be awarded the yellow and blue flag, beaches have to meet mandatory standard water quality and must be clean, safe and well-managed. Penmon is classified for these purposes as being a "rural" beach and as a result the standards for a Seaside Award differ from those applied for "resort" beaches, which are expected to have a wider selection of facilities such as toilets and car parks. The beach has been awarded the flag from 2003 onwards.

== Popular culture ==
Penmon was featured in film when it was used (along with Snowdonia) as the setting for The Fever, a 2004 film starring Vanessa Redgrave and Angelina Jolie. The region was used, at the choice of a London-based production company, to represent an Eastern Europe country. Jolie had filmed in North Wales in 2002 for Lara Croft Tomb Raider: The Cradle of Life and had apparently been "enchanted" by the scenery. The scenes involving Jolie and Redgrave were shot in February 2003. Filming took place at the Priory and the dovecot was used to depict a deserted church. Extras from Gwynedd and Anglesey were also used in filming. Penmon Priory has also been used for the BBC programme Songs of Praise, featuring Aled Jones (who comes from Llandegfan, a village about seven miles from Penmon) and also for filming the 1960s television show Danger Man, starring Patrick McGoohan.

In November 2020, Penmon hosted filming for the 20th series of I'm A Celebrity Get Me Out Of Here. The opening episode of the series showed celebrities such as Mo Farah, Jordan North and Shane Richie abseiling down the cliff face.

== Notable residents ==
- Akira The Don, independent Pop and Hip-Hop musician, lived in the village for some time in his youth and blames the "bleak and depressing" nature of the landscape for making him "a moodly little bugger".[sic]

== Geology ==
There are many geological features in Penmon, including fossils of brachiopods, a tunnel under a cliff and the cliff itself. The cliff is made up of limestone and shale, in alternating layers. It has been moved many times due to faults fracturing and moving the beds of rock, and there are distinct lines where the beds have been moved. The cliff is approximately eight metres high; however, the distribution of limestone and shale is different near the top and bottom of the cliff. There is a gradual change of shale to limestone; near the bottom there is a lot more shale per metre of rock and nearer the top there is a lot more limestone. The cliff has been struck by several faults, causing it to look unstable; rocks fall from it from time to time. Penmon is close to the sea, thus making it prone to erosion. Quite a lot of the cliff has been eroded away, thus causing an arch to form under the cliff. The shale has eroded away faster than the limestone beds, and as such, has caused thinner beds of limestone between to collapse. This is the reason the arch is only a few metres high and does not extend further, where there are less shale beds. Faults passing through the cliff have displaced the beds, one such fault almost 23 cm, causing a ledge halfway through the tunnel.

Tunnel under the cliff at Penmon. The beds are angled due to folding, which has caused the rock to tilt.

The grey-brown veined limestone quarried in the area is known as "Penmon marble". Brachiopod fossils are sometimes found in it. The largest of the Penmon quarries, Dinmor Park, was worked for limestone by Dinmor Quarries Ltd from about 1898 until the 1970s. Penmon limestone (along with limestone from Llanddona, Moelfre and Holyhead) was used to build Birmingham Town Hall and help with the reconstruction of Liverpool and Manchester following the destruction caused by World War II. The stone was also used in the construction of the Menai Suspension Bridge (completed in 1826) and the Britannia Bridge (completed in 1850).
