= Ash Ranges =

Nature reserve in Surrey, England

Coordinates: 51.268°N 0.660°W

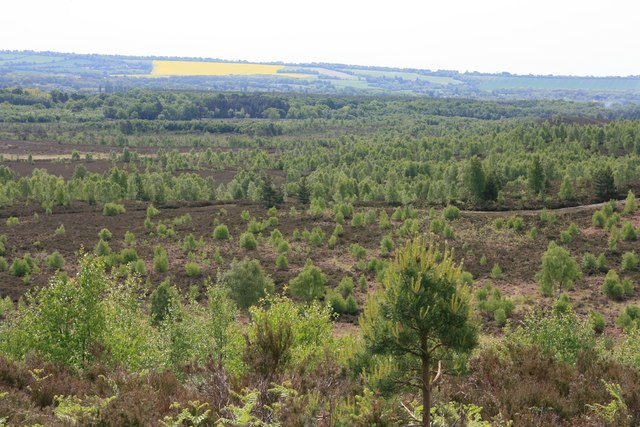
- Interactive map of Ash Ranges
- Type: Nature reserve
- Location: Pirbright, Surrey
- OS grid: SU936529
- Area: 1,392 hectares (3,440 acres)
- Manager: Surrey Wildlife Trust

Ash Ranges is a 1,392-hectare (3,440-acre) nature reserve west of Pirbright in Surrey. It is owned by the Ministry of Defence and managed by the Surrey Wildlife Trust. It is part of the Thames Basin Heaths Special Protection Area and the Ash to Brookwood Heaths Site of Special Scientific Interest

This large area of dry heath provides a habitat for many rare plants, invertebrates and reptiles, including the rare sand lizard. There are flora such as the carnivorous round-leaved sundew, bell heather and early-purple orchid, and heath tiger and green tiger beetles, while birds include nightjars, woodlarks and Dartford warblers.

There is no access to danger areas when red flags are flying.
