= RAF Hell's Mouth =

Former Royal Air Force Range and Landing Ground in Gwynedd, Wales

RAF Hell's Mouth
- Near Abersoch, Gwynedd in Wales
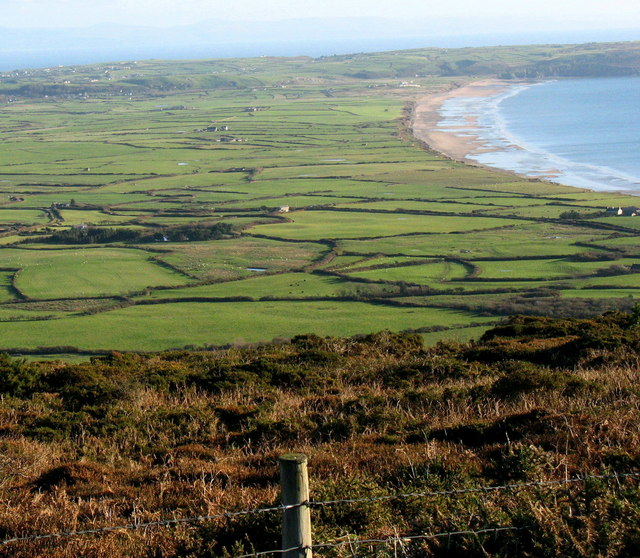
- The site of RAF Hell's Mouth

Site information
- Type: Emergency Landing Ground; Air gunnery and bombing range
- Owner: Air Ministry
- Operator: Royal Air Force
- Controlled by: RAF Coastal Command

Location
- Shown within Gwynedd RAF Hell's Mouth (the United Kingdom)
- Coordinates: 52°48′25″N 004°32′14″W

Site history
- Built: 1940
- In use: 1937-1940 (Air gunnery and bombing range); 1940-1947 (Relief / Emergency Landing Ground)
- Battles/wars: Second World War; *European theatre of World War II

Airfield information
- Elevation: 18 metres (59 ft) AMSL
Runways
Direction	Length and surface
00/00	Grass

Royal Air Force Hell's Mouth, or more simply RAF Hell's Mouth, is a former Royal Air Force air gunnery and bombing range. It was initially redeveloped into a Relief Landing Ground, and then became an Emergency Landing Ground. It is situated at Hell's Mouth (Porth Neigwl), on the Llŷn Peninsula, near the small village and community of Llanengan, and about 2 miles (3 km) from Abersoch, Gwynedd, Wales.

It was opened in 1937 on land acquired by the Air Ministry. Just before the Second World War the range was used for training by No. 5 Armament Training Camp RAF and subsequently No. 5 Armament Training Station RAF, at RAF Penrhos. The range was also used by a variety of operational units.

The use of the range had reduced by early 1940. The RAF had larger and faster aircraft in operational service, which required a change in training techniques. Also, the weather at Hell's Mouth sometimes made it difficult to use the range, especially when shrouded in sea mist. The range was then developed into a Relief Landing Ground for No. 9 (Observers) Advanced Flying Unit RAF, or (O)AFU.

The redevelopment included a moving target range, which saw the USAAF take an interest in it, due to its success. By the time the (O)AFU was disbanded, RAF Hell's Mouth had become more of an emergency landing ground. The airfield remained open for flying until early 1947, but was then abandoned.

== History ==
RAF Hell's Mouth was commissioned in February 1937 as a Relief Landing Ground, later an Emergency Landing Ground for RAF Penrhos. It took its name from the local coastline which is known as Hell's Mouth due to the 'hellish' conditions for sailors with little shelter from the sea. It was also an air gunnery and bombing range, with targets on the land, floated 1 mile (1.61 km) offshore, and towed drogues in the air. A small range railway was later in use to provide moving targets.

=== Air gunnery and bombing range ===
There was a requirement for bombing and gunnery ranges to support the Armament Practice Station newly built at RAF Penrhos, around 10 miles (16 km) north-east. Compulsory purchase of seven farms, the bay and the 7 miles (11 km) long beach from Rhiw Mountain (Mynydd Rhiw) at its north western end down to Cilan Head, was completed. Offshore bombing practice targets were a couple of anchored rafts, at which trainees would aim 8.5 lb (4 kg) smoke bombs. However, training with live bombs had to take place outside the three-mile out from shore limit. For air gunnery practice, target rings on 10 square feet (0.9 m^{2}) canvas sheets, situated along the beach line, were used.

The range opened in 1937 and was used by various Flying Training Schools. These were month-long training detachments operating out of RAF Penrhos. Westland Wallace, a British two-seat, general-purpose biplane, and later Hawker Henley, a British two-seat target tug, were the target towing aircraft used. High level, low level and (shallow) dive bombing were all practised at the range, along with air-to-ground firing and air-to-air gunnery practice, all subject to the weather conditions at RAF Hell's Mouth. Aircraft commonly seen using the range were Hawker Hart, a British two-seater biplane light bomber; Hawker Demon, a fighter variant of the Hawker Hart; and Hawker Audax, a Hawker Hart variant, designed for army cooperation, followed later by Gloster Gladiator, a British biplane fighter aircraft, and Fairey Battle, a British single-engine light bomber aircraft.

=== Relief / Emergency Landing Ground ===
The grass strip was created in 1937 as a range for No. 5 Armament Training Camp RAF, based at nearby RAF Penrhos. The initial accommodation was under canvas, and Nissen huts were provided for workshop space. The plan was to extend the small grass airfield, and on the south-east corner of the site three Bellman hangars were constructed along with aprons. Situated between these and the sea, a large moving target railway was laid out, and by July 1940 these were completed, however the extensions to the airfield were not ready until May 1941. From then it was open as a relief landing ground for No. 9 (Observers) Advanced Flying Unit from RAF Penrhos.

The moving target range was an oval-shaped course. It was a narrow-gauge railway which used a pulley system and a target vehicle which was powered by a `V' twin JAP engine. The target vehicle was a motorised flat truck which carried a wooden model of an aircraft. This was fired at by the trainee gunners, from a replica gun turret, as the wooden model travelled the light railway. Targets off shore were provided by floats moored in the bay. Personnel based at RAF Hell's Mouth to operate the bombing range and gunnery targets included an officer, a flight sergeant, around 30 airmen and a few other RAF personnel types, and Nissen and wooden huts were added for accommodation.

The most common aircraft used for training at the range was the Avro Anson, a British twin-engine, multi-role aircraft. 12 lb (5.5 kg) smoke bombs were now used which ignited on hitting the sea. The range had three observation towers: one was situated in the south-west corner, a second was located in the middle, next to the camp, and the third tower was in the far north-west. Using telescopes to view the smoke bomb hits, observers within the three towers would record the compass bearing on a fixed brass ring.

Typical aircraft using the airfield were Bristol Blenheim and Armstrong Whitworth Whitley. In August 1944 a Vickers Wellington was successfully landed by a Polish pilot following an engine failure. The aircraft later successfully took off.

== Current use ==
The site was decommissioned in 1945 and returned to agriculture.

== See also ==
- List of former Royal Air Force stations
