= Cilan Head =

Coordinates: 52°46′41″N 4°31′43″W

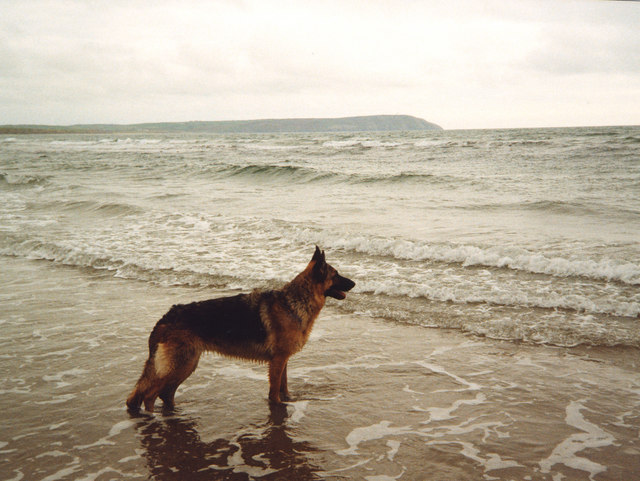
Looking across Hell's Mouth beach towards Cilan Head

Cilan Head is a headland on the tip of the Llŷn Peninsula of Gwynedd in northwestern Wales, near Abersoch.

Cilan Head is the southernmost point of the peninsula, on roughly the same latitude as Dyffryn Ardudwy, between Harlech and Barmouth. To the north of the head is the hamlet of Cilan Uchaf, a holiday home and a horse riding school. To the west of the head is Porth Neigwyl or Nigel, an indented bay of about four miles long, which is named after Sir Nigel Loring. Beyond the headland further to the east is Saint Tudwal's Island West and St Tudwal’s Lighthouse, built in the late 1870s.

The BBC describes Cilan Head as "an area of common ground covering 215 acres", with "grazing rights for 900 sheep, 79 cattle, 30 geese and three ponies on the headland". They note that blades used by Mesolithic nomadic hunters have been unearthed at the site. The head is a breeding ground for birds, particularly cormorants. Populations of the black minotaur beetle and green tiger beetle have been found in the head.

Cilan Head is known for being a dangerous place to rock climb, and is popular with climbing enthusiasts. The cliff, near the Ty’n Tywyn Quarries, consists of a mixture of shale and grit bands.
