= Hell's Mouth =

Hell's Mouth or Hells Mouth may refer to:

== Places ==
- Porth Neigwl, or Hell's Mouth, a bay in North Wales
  - RAF Hell's Mouth, a former airfield
  - Hells Mouth Grits, a geological formation
- Hell's Mouth, Cornwall, a cove in Cornwall, England
- Boca do Inferno (Portuguese for Hell's Mouth), a cave near Cascais, Portugal

== Other uses ==
- Hells' Mouth, a play by Nick Darke
