= Abersoch Lifeboat Station =

RNLI lifeboat station in Gwynedd, Wales

- Gorsaf Bad Achub Abersoch

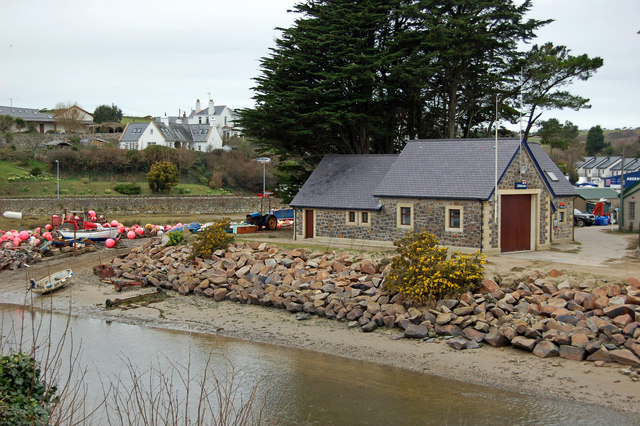
- Abersoch Lifeboat Station in 2008

- Location within Gwynedd
- Former names: Penrhyn Dû Lifeboat Station

General information
- Type: Lifeboat station
- Location: Min-y-Don, Abersoch, Gwynedd, LL53 7AG, United Kingdom
- Coordinates: 52.8266°N 4.5034°W
- Opened: First station 1844; Current building 1994
- Owner: Royal National Lifeboat Institution

Website
- Abersoch RNLI Lifeboat Station

Abersoch Lifeboat Station sits overlooking the harbour at Abersoch, a village approximately 27 miles (43 km) south of Caernarfon, on the south-east coast of the Llŷn Peninsula, in Gwynedd, Wales.

Penrhyn Dû Lifeboat Station was established just to the south of the village in 1844, by the Royal National Institution for the Preservation of Life from Shipwreck (RNIPLS), operating until 1853. A new station, Abersoch Lifeboat Station, was established by the Royal National Lifeboat Institution (RNLI) in 1869, operating until 1931.

A new Inshore lifeboat station was established at Abersoch in 1965, moving into its present building in 1994. The station currently operates a B-class (Atlantic 85) Inshore lifeboat, Peter and Ann Setten (B-886), on station since 2015.

== History ==
In 1844, a lifeboat was provided by the RNIPLS, stationed at Penrhyn Dû, which overlooks 'St. Tudwal's Roads', just to the south of Abersoch, and was managed by a local committee.

In severe weather on 1 July 1845, the American ship Glendower ran aground on the Porthmadog bar. Attempts to abandon ship failed, when the ship's boat was swamped, and local pilots made two unsuccessful attempts to rescue the crew. The Porthmadog Harbour Master and three Captains set off to Abersoch, a journey of 20 miles (32 km), and launched the Penrhyn Dû lifeboat, but by the time they had crossed the bay, the gale had moderated, and the crew of the Glendower had been rescued. However, for their efforts, each was awarded the RNIPLS Silver Medal.

One report suggests that the lifeboat capsized in July 1845, but no specific details of this event has been found. It was recorded that the coats and jackets of the four men were washed away, having been removed for ease of rowing, so it may well be that the silver medals were awarded for their gallantry and being capsized, rather than for having effected a rescue. No other records of service have been found, other than the station ceased to operate in 1853, when the lifeboat was condemned and subsequently sold.

Following reports to the RNLI committee of management in 1868, after visits by both Capt. D. Robertson, RN, Assistant Inspector of Lifeboats, and Capt. John. R. Ward, RN, Inspector of Lifeboats, a new lifeboat house was subsequently ordered to be constructed at Abersoch.

A 33 ft 0 in (10.06 m) Peake-class self-righting 'Pulling and Sailing' (P&S) lifeboat, one with both sails and (10) oars, was provided to the station in 1869. A lifeboat house had been constructed at a cost of £170, situated on the south side of the harbour, on Lon Pen Cei, (where there is now a car park).

A large number of vessels are often at anchor in St. Tudwell's Roads off that place, which are liable to accident or sudden changes of wind, and the local residents were therefore desirous to have a life-boat in readiness for any such emergency.

— The Life-Boat, Vol. VII, No. 77, 1 July 1870

Via the efforts of Mr Robert Whitworth and the Rev. E. Hewlett, MA, and the Manchester branch of the RNLI, the lifeboat had been funded by Mr Robert Barnes, also of Manchester. It was the fourteenth lifeboat provided to the Institution via the Manchester branch. At a ceremony of 15 October 1869, the lifeboat was handed to the care of R. Lloyd Edwards, president of the Abersoch branch, followed by prayers from Rev. T. Jones, rector of the parish. The lifeboat was named Mabel Louisa (ON 237), after the daughter of Mr Barnes, and then launched on demonstration to the assembled crowd.

Just three months after the station opened, the lifeboat was proving its worth. On the night of 14 January 1870, the Mabel Louisa was launched to the aid of the Kenilworth of Liverpool, which had run aground on Sarn Badrig, while carrying a cargo of tobacco and cotton on passage from New Orleans. Eight crew were rescued by the Barmouth lifeboat, but it was forced to leave when the weather deteriorated further. Their first attempt to find the vessel being unsuccessful, the Abersoch lifeboat launched for a second time, this time with the Honorary Secretary on board. It took three hours searching for the lifeboat crew to find the wreck, but finally getting alongside, 13 men were saved. Rev. Owen Lloyd Williams was awarded the RNLI Silver Medal for his part in this rescue, and for helping save 52 lives on other occasions.

Rev. Williams was awarded a second silver medal (second-service clasp) in 1879, for his 'intrepid services', at both Abersoch and nearby Porthdinllaen Lifeboat Station.

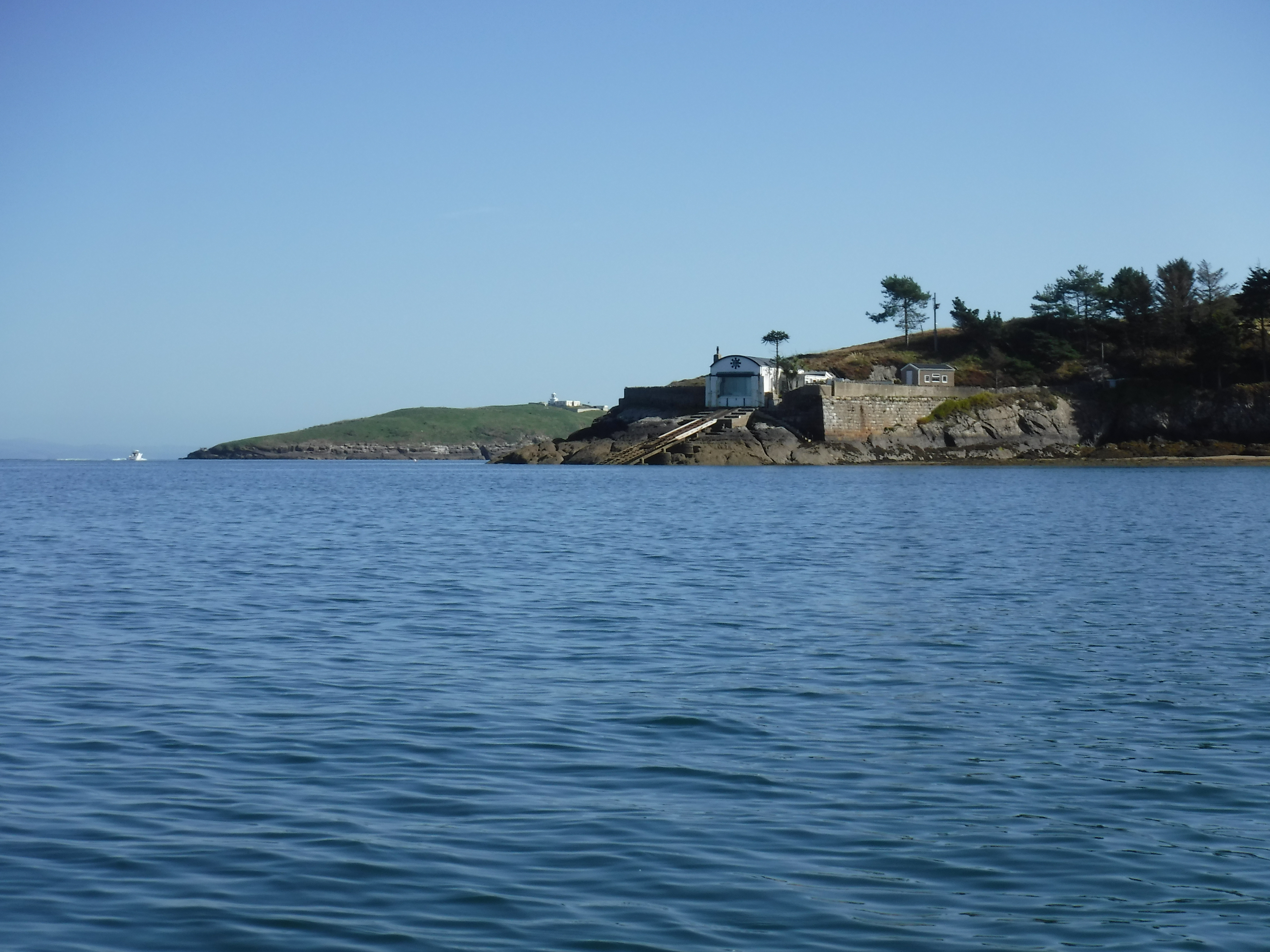
1894 boathouse at Penrhyn Dû

In 1892, a new 34 ft 0 in (10.36 m) self-righting lifeboat was placed at Abersoch. This prompted the construction of a new lifeboat house, which was built at the end of the headland at Penrhyn Dû (Black Point). The boathouse was completed in 1894, at a cost of £1,376, and featured a roller slipway, to allow launching directly into the water. Some documentation refers to station as Penrhyn Dû, but officially it remained as Abersoch lifeboat station. This boathouse was extended in 1897 by the addition of a watch room, costing a further £137.

Abersoch Lifeboat Station was closed in 1931, when a motor lifeboat was stationed at Pwllheli, which could cover the coast around Abersoch. The 1894 building still stands and is known as the 'old lifeboat station'.

== Inshore lifeboat station ==
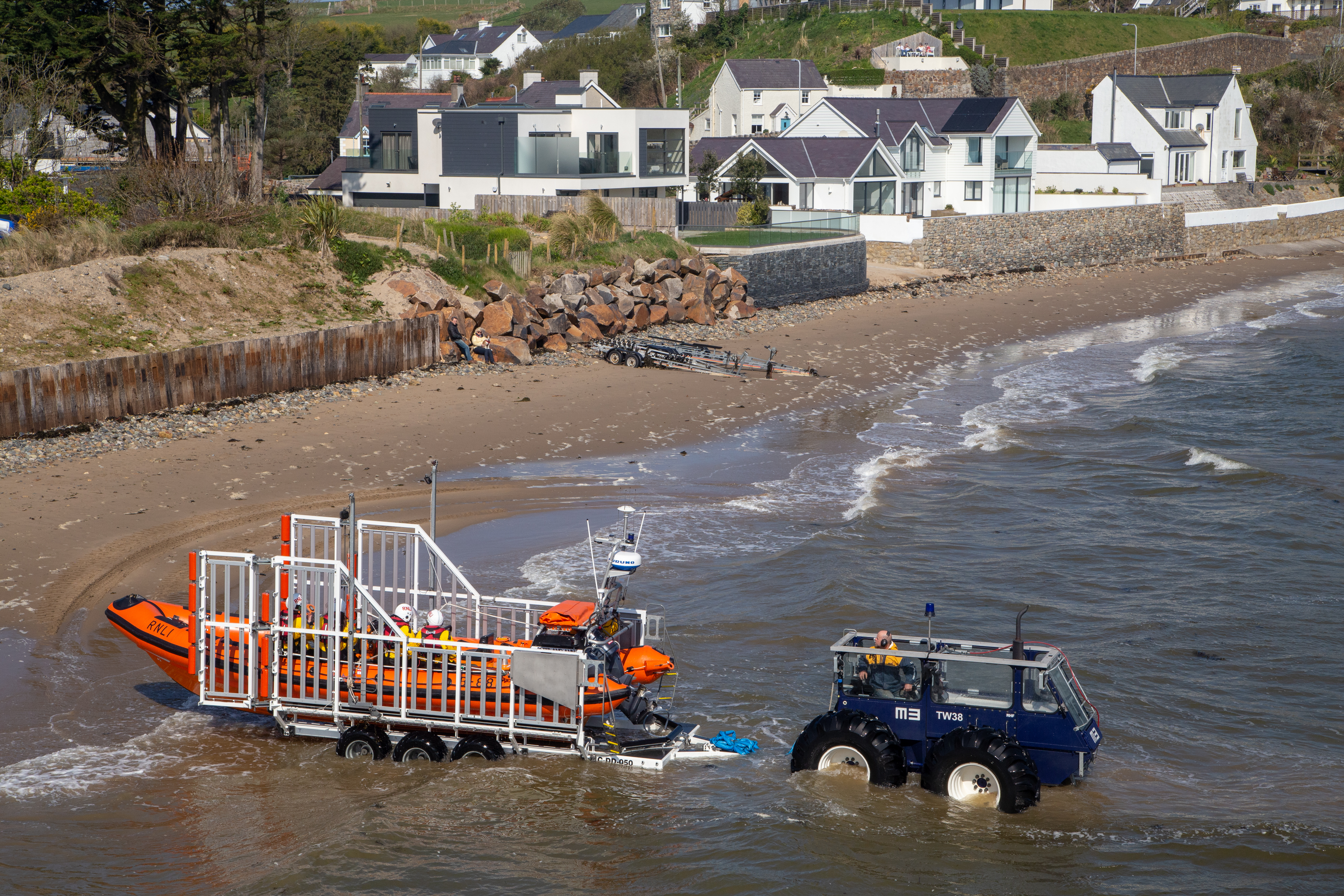
Launching Peter and Ann Setten (B-886)

In 1964, in response to an increasing amount of water-based leisure activity, the RNLI placed 25 small fast Inshore lifeboats around the country. These were easily launched with just a few people, ideal to respond quickly to local emergencies.

More stations were opened, and in June 1965, a lifeboat station was re-established at Abersoch, with the arrival of a D-class (RFD PB16) Inshore lifeboat, the unnamed (D-70). The lifeboat didn't return to Penrhyn Dû, but was stored in the village. The D-class inshore lifeboats operated at Abersoch until 1978.

An appeal in Wolverhampton in 1977 raised over £30,000, and a cheque was presented to the Chairman of the Institution, Major General Ralph Farrant, at the London Boat Show on 6 January 1978. This provided the funds for a new larger and more powerful B-class (Atlantic 21) Inshore lifeboat, duly named Wolverhampton (B-540), the launch equipment, and the construction of a boathouse, on the north side of Abersoch harbour.

A sea-defence wall was constructed as protection for the boathouse in 1986, after the bank adjacent to the boathouse was eroded during the 1985 spring tides, and the following year, the boathouse was extended, so that the tractor could be kept coupled to the launch carriage.

150 years after the first lifeboat was placed at Abersoch, a completely new lifeboat station, with improved crew facilities, was built in 1994.

In 2015, the station received a B-class (Atlantic 85), replacing the Atlantic 75 Margaret Bench of Solihull (B-790), on station since 2002. Funded from the bequest of Ann Constance Setten, of Shropshire, at a ceremony in April 2016, the lifeboat was named Peter and Ann Setten (B-886), in memory of Ann and her husband.

== Notable rescues ==
The Inshore lifeboat crews have been recognised for several difficult rescues. On 25 June 1972 the Abersoch and Pwllheli lifeboats rescued two people from rocks at Cilan Head using a breeches buoy. The Abersoch crew were accorded 'The Thanks of the Institution inscribed on Vellum'.

Three crew members received 'Framed Letters of Thanks signed by the Chairman of the Institution', for rescuing a climber, who fell 35 m (38 yd) from cliffs into the sea on 13 April 1977.

A girl and her dog were rescued from a rock on 26 October 2000. The operation was carried out after dark and in rough seas. Two Abersoch crew members received 'The Thanks of the Institution inscribed on Vellum' in 2001.

== Station honours ==
The following are awards made at Abersoch:

- RNIPLS Silver Medal
  Capt. William E. Morris, Porthmadog Harbour Master – 1845
  Evan Jones, Master Mariner – 1845
  Benjamin Griffiths, Master Mariner – 1845
  Robert Parry, Master Mariner – 1845
- RNLI Silver Medal
  Rev. Owen Lloyd Williams, Honorary Secretary – 1870
  Rev. Owen Lloyd Williams, Honorary Secretary – 1879 (Second-service clasp)
- 'The Thanks of the Institution inscribed on Vellum'
  Barrie McGill, Helm – 1972
  Michael Bosley, crew member – 1972
  Richard Hughes, Helm – 2001
  Simon Harris, crew member – 2001
- 'Framed Letters of Thanks signed by the Chairman of the Institution'
  Barrie McGill, Helm – 1977
  N. Loughlin, crew member – 1977
  M. Davies, crew member – 1977
- Member, Order of the British Empire (MBE)
  Barrie Duncan McGill, Lifeboat Operations Manager, former Helm – 2009QBH

== Penrhyn Dû lifeboat ==
=== Pulling and sailing (P&S) lifeboats ===
On station	ON (Note: ON is the RNLI's Official Number of the boat.)	Name	Built	Class	Comments
1844–1853	Pre-208	Unnamed	1869	26-foot Palmer	(Note: 26 ft 0 in (7.92 m) x 6 ft 9 in (2.06 m) (6-oared) Palmer-class non-self-righting lifeboat, funded by the RNIPLS, built by Taylor of Blackwall, London, costing £72.); Capsized July 1845. Condemned and broken up, 1853.

Pre ON numbers are unofficial numbers used by the Lifeboat Enthusiasts' Society to reference early lifeboats not included on the official RNLI list.

== Abersoch lifeboats ==
=== Pulling and sailing (P&S) lifeboats ===
On station	ON	Name	Built	Class	Comments
1869–1892	237	Mabel Louisa	1869	33-foot Peake self-righting (P&S)	(Note: 33 ft 0 in (10.06 m) x 8 ft 2 in (2.49 m) (10-oared) Peake-class self-righting (P&S) lifeboat, gift of Mr R. Barnes of Manchester, built by Forrestt of Limehouse, London, costing £276.); Broken up in 1892.
1892–1904	335	Oldham	1892	34-foot self-righting (P&S)	(Note: 34 ft 0 in (10.36 m) x 8 ft 0 in (2.44 m) (10-oared) self-righting (P&S) lifeboat, gift of the Oldham LB fund, built by Forrestt of Limehouse, London, costing £276.); Transferred to the Relief fleet, withdrawn in 1913.
1904–1930	530	Oldham	1904	38-foot Watson (P&S)	(Note: 38 ft 0 in (11.58 m) x 9 ft 4 in (2.84 m) (12-oared) Watson-class non-self-righting (P&S) lifeboat, gift of the Oldham LB fund, built by Thames Ironworks of Blackwall, London, costing £992.)
1930–1931	581	Reserve No. 7D	1907	38-foot Watson (P&S)	(Note: 38 ft 0 in (11.58 m) x 9 ft 4 in (2.84 m) (12-oared) Watson-class non-self-righting (P&S) lifeboat, legacy of Miss M. M. Stephenson of Chelsea, London, built by Thames Ironworks of Blackwall, London, costing £1,121.); Previously Maria Stephenson at Buckie.

Station closed, 1931
More post-service details can be found on the respective lifeboat class pages.

=== Inshore lifeboats ===
==== D class ====
On station	Op.No. (Note: Op.No. is the RNLI's Operational Number carried on the hull or vehicle.)	Name	Class	Comments
1965–1968	D-70	Unnamed	D-class (RFD PB16)	
1968–1970	D-12	Unnamed	D-class (RFD PB16)	First stationed at Aberdovey in 1963.
1971–1978	D-192	Unnamed	D-class (RFD PB16)	

==== B class ====
On station	Op.No.	Name	Class	Comments
1978–1990	B-540	Wolverhampton	B-class (Atlantic 21)	
1990–2002	B-582	Borough of Solihull	B-class (Atlantic 21)	
2002–2015	B-790	Margaret Bench of Solihull	B-class (Atlantic 75)	
2015–	B-886	Peter and Ann Setten	B-class (Atlantic 85)	

=== Launch and recovery tractors ===
Op.No.	Reg. No.	Type	On station	Comments
TW06	VRU 611S	Talus MB-764 County	1978–1988	
TW02	LRU 581P	Talus MB-764 County	1988–1997	
TW07	XLJ 796S	Talus MB-764 County	1997–2003	
TW09	PEL 169W	Talus MB-764 County	2003–2009	
TW43	S540 UNT	Talus MB-764 County	2009–2017	
TW38	N469 XAW	Talus MB-764 County	2017–	

== See also ==
- List of RNLI stations
- List of former RNLI stations
- Royal National Lifeboat Institution lifeboats
- Talus Atlantic 85 DO-DO launch carriage
