= Hugh Holbeche =

Welsh priest

Hugh Holbeche was a 15th-century priest.

He held the living of Llanengan, was a Prebendary of Lichfield; and Dean of St Asaph from 1404 until his death in 1417.
