= St Engan's Church, Llanengan =

Church in Gwynedd

Coordinates: 52.8138°N 4.5328°W

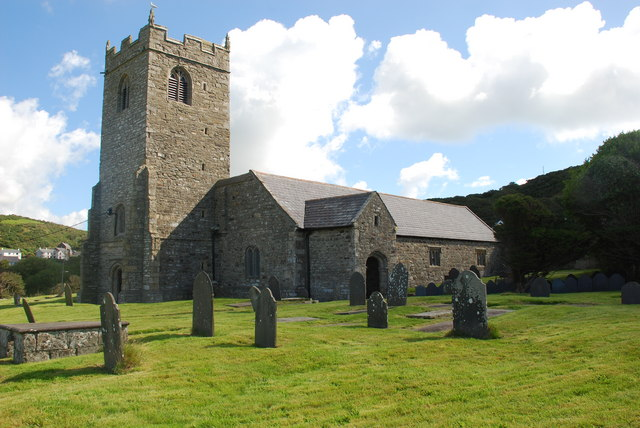

- Location in Conwy County Borough
- OS grid reference: SH 293 270
- Location: Llanengan, Gwynedd
- Country: Wales
- Denomination: Church in Wales

History
- Status: Active
- Dedication: Saint Engan

Architecture
- Heritage designation: Grade I
- Designated: 19 October 1971
- Architectural type: Church
- Groundbreaking: 13th century
- Completed: 1520-1534

Administration
- Diocese: Bangor
- Archdeaconry: Meirionnydd
- Deanery: Synod Meirionnydd
- Parish: Bro Enlli

St Engan's Church is an active parish church in Llanengan, Gwynedd, Wales. The village lies in the south of the Llŷn Peninsula, south-west of Abersoch. Cadw records that the current church dates mainly from the 1530s, with 13th-century origins. It is a Grade I listed building.

== History ==
The village of Llanengan stands 1.2 mi (1.9 km) south-west of Abersoch just inland from the southern coast of the Llŷn Peninsula. The church stands in the centre and is dedicated to Saint Engan. A Welsh saint of the 5th or 6th centuries, his remains are said to be buried in the church. The church dates from the 13th century, but almost all of the present structure is from a building campaign between 1520 and 1534. Later restorations were undertaken in the 19th and 20th centuries. The church was on the pilgrimage route to St Mary's Abbey on Bardsey Island.

The church remains an active parish church in the Diocese of Bangor and regular services are held.

== Architecture and description ==
Richard Haslam, Julian Orbach and Adam Voelcker, in their 2009 edition Gywnedd, in the Buildings of Wales series, describe the church as among "the most beautiful" of the pilgrimage churches on the peninsula. The nave and chancel are continuous, a south porch and a west tower. The tower contains an inscribed panel, the translation reading, "this tower was built in honour of St Einion, King of Wales, apostle of the Scots in 1534". The building material is local rubble, while the roofs are modern slate replacements. The interior mainly dates from the Tudor rebuilding. The Royal Commission on the Ancient and Historical Monuments of Wales (RCAHMW) records the two "outstanding medieval screens dating from around 1530". St Engan's is a Grade I listed building. The lychgate, a secondary gate and its wall, and two graves enclosed with railings are all listed at Grade II.

== Sources ==
- Baring-Gould, Sabine (1908). The Lives of the British Saints: The Saints of Wales and Cornwall and Such Irish Saints as Have Dedications in Britain. Vol. III. London: Charles Clark.
- Haslam, Richard; Orbach, Julian; Voelcker, Adam (2009). Gwynedd. The Buildings of Wales. New Haven, US and London: Yale University Press. ISBN 978-0-300-14169-6. OCLC 1023292902.
