= Einion Frenin =

Welsh confessor and saint of the Celtic Church

Saint Einion the King
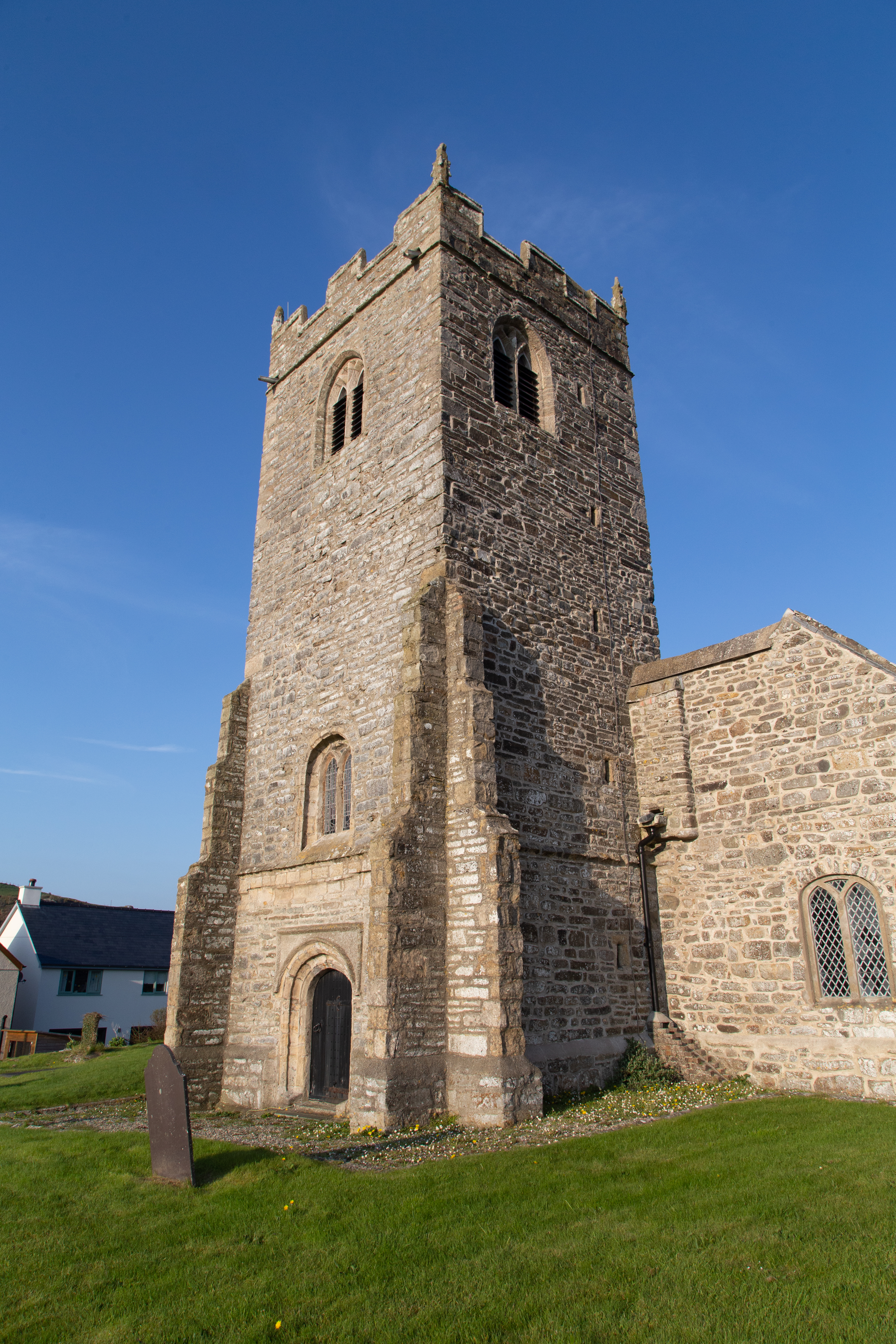
- The 15th century St Engan's Church, Llanegan holding Einion's remains

King of Llŷn
- Died: 6th century
- Canonized: Pre-Congregation
- Major shrine: Llanengan
- Feast: 9 February (Eastern Orthodoxy); 10 or 12 February (formerly)
- Patronage: Llanengan

Saint Einion Frenin (Welsh: old Enniaun, mod. Sant Einion or Engan Frenin, lit. "Saint Einion the King"; Latin: Ennianus or Anianus) was a late 5th and early 6th century Welsh confessor and saint of the Celtic Church. His feast day was originally given as 9 February, although this had moved to the 10th or 12th by the 16th century and is no longer observed by either the Anglican or Catholic church in Wales.

== Life ==
Saint Einion was a son of Owain Whitetooth (Owain Danwyn) and the brother of Cuneglasus, king of Rhos, and of saints Seiriol and Meirion. (Note: He was also formerly given as the son of Einion Yrth ap Cunedda.) Part of Gwynedd's Cuneddan dynasty, he seems to have ruled as a local king (Latin: regulus) over the Llŷn Peninsula southwest of Anglesey and possibly over Anglesey itself. He was credited with granting his brother Seiriol the land for his monastery (Welsh: clas) at Penmon on Anglesey and, later, his hermitage on Puffin Island. He also lured the Breton saint Cadfan from Tywyn to found St Mary's Abbey, the first religious establishment on Bardsey Island. Although not part of the Cistercian Way, this became a major site of pilgrimage in Wales. Einion himself is sometimes said to have joined Cadfan's community on the island, although his relics were claimed by the church at Llanengan.

== Legacy ==
Einion Frenin was credited with the establishment of the original church at Llanengan, St Einion's. The present church there, which was erected in the late 15th or early 16th century, had a gilt and crowned statue of him prior to the Reformation and bears Latin inscriptions reading Æniani Rex Wallie and Rex Walliæ ("Einion, king of Wales"). Miraculous locations nearby include Ffynnon Engan ("Einion's Well") and Ol Troed March Engan ("The Hoofprint of Einion's Horse"), a petrosomatoglyph near Castell Cinan whose collected rainwater was claimed to possess curative powers. Other placenames possibly related to the king are Ogo' Engan ("Einion's Cave"), Bryn Engan ("Einion's Hill"), Caer Engan ("Engan's Camp"), and Croes Engan ("Einion's Cross"), a farm in Denbighshire.

Llandogo in Monmouthshire was also sometimes previously known as Lann Enniaun ("Llanennion") and the bard Hywel Rheinallt composed a cywydd to the "golden-handed" Saint Einion in the late 15th century, recording another (now unknown) church in Gwynedd dedicated to St Einion.

== See also ==
- Einion, for other Welshmen of the same name
