= Ash to Brookwood Heaths =

Protected area in Surrey, England

Coordinates: 51.277°N 0.687°W

- Site of Special Scientific Interest
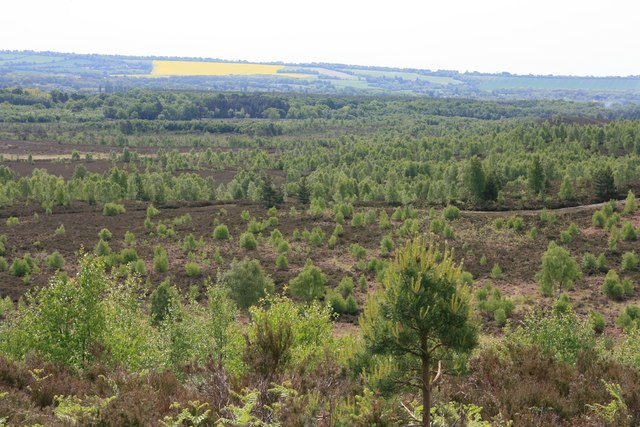
- Location of Ash to Brookwood Heaths.
- Area of search: Surrey
- Grid reference: SU 917 539
- Interest: Biological
- Area: 1,576.3 hectares (3,895 acres)
- Notification date: 1993
- Location map: Magic Map

Ash to Brookwood Heaths is a 1,576.3-hectare (3,895-acre) biological Site of Special Scientific Interest west of Guildford in Surrey. It is a Nature Conservation Review site, Grade I. It is part of the Thames Basin Heaths Special Protection Area and the Thursley, Ash, Pirbright and Chobham Special Area of Conservation. An area of 1,392 hectares (3,440 acres) is managed as a nature reserve by the Surrey Wildlife Trust.

This site has dry heathland, wet heath and bog. Large areas have been protected from development because they are army training ranges (part of the land area designated as Ash to Brookwood Heaths SSSI is owned by the Ministry of Defence). The site is important for mosses and liverworts and there are nationally important populations of nightjars, woodlarks, Dartford warblers and hobbies.
