= St Tudwal's Lighthouse =

Lighthouse in Gwynedd, Wales

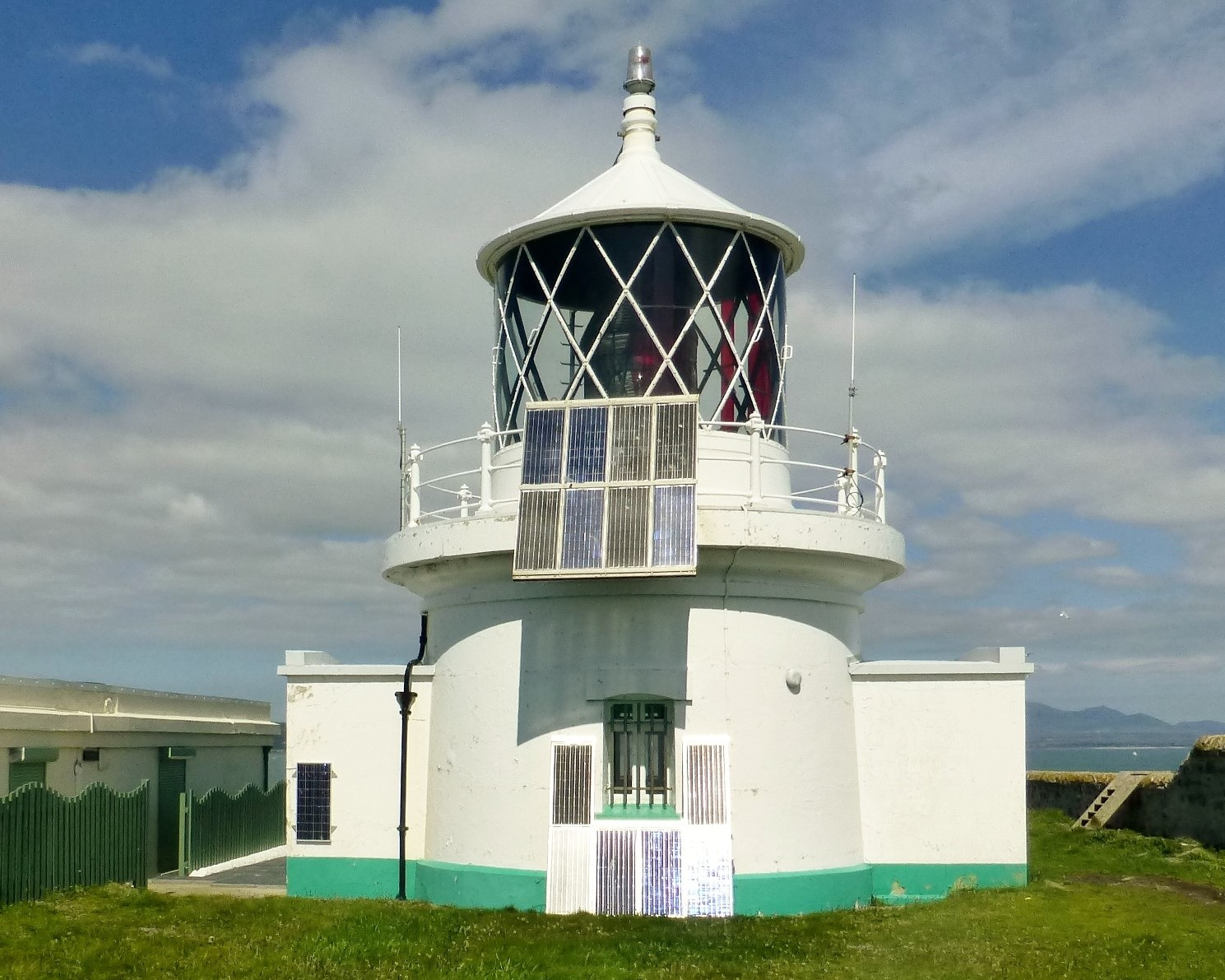
- St Tudwal's Lighthouse
- Location: Saint Tudwal's Islands; Llŷn Peninsula; Wales; United Kingdom
- Coordinates: 52.798536°N 4.471191°W

Tower
- Constructed: 1877
- Construction: masonry tower
- Automated: 1922
- Height: 11 metres (36 ft)
- Shape: cylindrical tower with balcony and lantern
- Markings: white tower and lantern
- Power source: solar power
- Operator: Trinity House
- Heritage: Grade II listed building

Light
- Focal height: 46 metres (151 ft)
- Lens: 2nd Order (700mm) fixed with Red Sector
- Intensity: 7,790 candela
- Range: 14 nautical miles (26 km; 16 mi)
- Characteristic: Fl WR 15s.

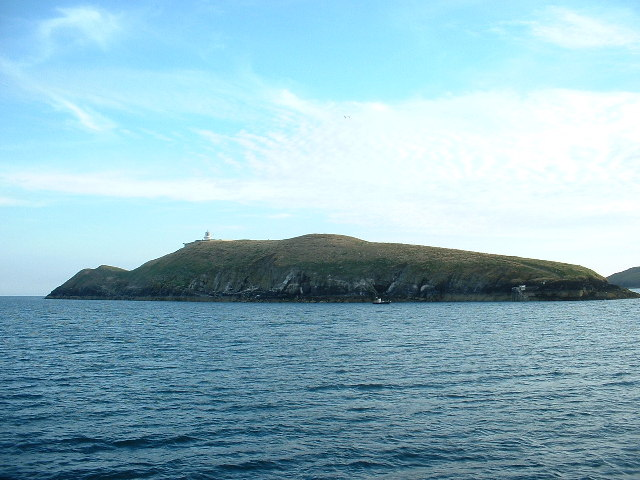
St Tudwal's Island West and lighthouse to left

St Tudwal's Lighthouse on Saint Tudwal's Island West is active, but unstaffed. The site of the lighthouse, which marks the north end of Cardigan Bay, was purchased by Trinity House in 1876 at the sum of £111 and the next year the stone building was complete. It is 10.7 metres (35 ft) tall, with its focal plane (height of light above high water) at 46 metres (151 ft). The main white light has a range of 14 nautical miles (26 km; 16 mi) and its red sector light has a shorter range of 10 nautical miles (19 km; 12 mi). It gives 1 white and red flash every 15 seconds, the intensity being 12,000 candelas (candle power).

Automated in 1922, it was one of the earlier lights Trinity House automated. It was electrified in 1995. The lighthouse keepers' cottages are now privately owned and used as a holiday home.

The lighthouse building is Grade II listed, as are the lighthousekeeper's cottage and the perimeter walls.

== See also ==
- List of lighthouses in Wales

== Sources ==
- Hague, D., B., Lighthouses of Wales Their Architecture and Archaeology (Royal Commission on the Ancient and Historical Monuments of Wales, edited by Hughes, S., 1994) ISBN 1-871184-08-8
