= Llanengan =

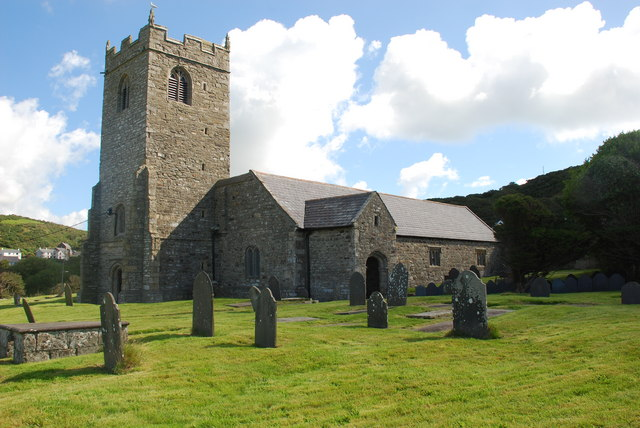
- Parish church dedicated to Saint Einion Frenin, a 6th-century king of Llŷn

- Location within Gwynedd
- Population: 1,989 (2011)
- OS grid reference: SH293269
- Community: Llanengan
- Principal area: Gwynedd
- Preserved county: Gwynedd
- Country: Wales
- Sovereign state: United Kingdom
- Post town: PWLLHELI
- Postcode district: LL53
- Dialling code: 01758
- Police: North Wales
- Fire: North Wales
- Ambulance: Welsh
- UK Parliament: Dwyfor Meirionnydd
- Senedd Cymru – Welsh Parliament: Dwyfor Meirionnydd
- List of places UK Wales Gwynedd 52.813°N 4.532°W Map of the community

Llanengan is a small village and community 1.2 mi (1.9 km) around Abersoch in Gwynedd in north-west Wales. It had a population of 2,024 at the 2001 census, which had been reduced to 1,989 at the 2011 Census. The popular seaside resort village of Abersoch falls within the community, as do the villages of Llangian, Mynytho, Machroes and Llanengan. The local public house is called the Sun.

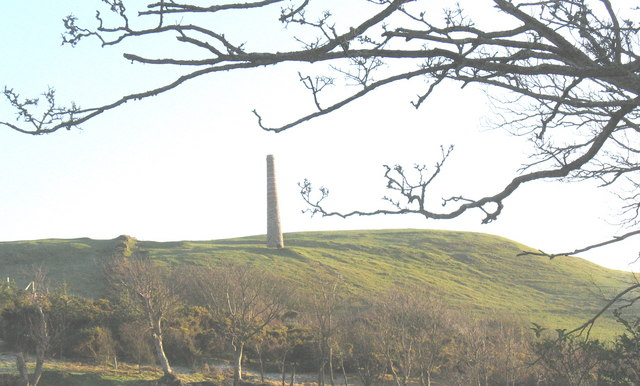
Ventilation chimney of the local lead mine.

Lead was formerly obtained from a lead mine just outside the village. A chimney can be seen on the left from the road to Porth Neigwl ("Hell's Mouth"), which marks the entrance to the former lead workings.

== Church ==
St Engan's Church is dedicated to Saint Einion Frenin, and was originally established in the late 5th or early 6th century and is one of the oldest churches on the Llŷn Peninsula.

== Governance ==
An electoral ward in the same name exists. This ward is smaller than the Community, with a total population taken at the 2011 Census of 1,206.

== Notable people ==
- Ellen Hughes (1867–1927), a Welsh-language writer, temperance reformer and suffragist.
- David Green (1939–2016) a Welsh first-class cricketer
