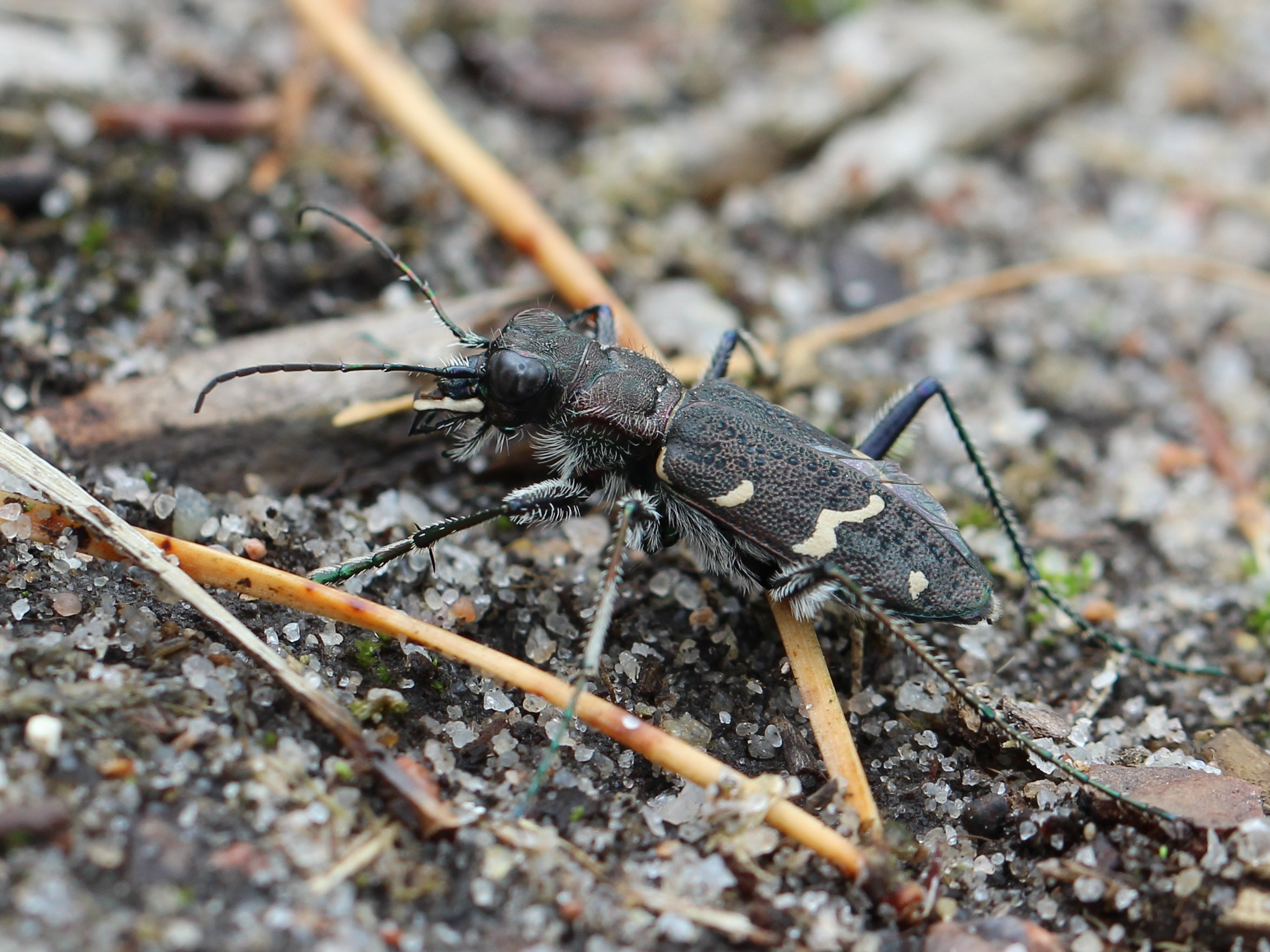

Scientific classification
- Kingdom: Animalia
- Phylum: Arthropoda
- Clade: Pancrustacea
- Class: Insecta
- Order: Coleoptera
- Suborder: Adephaga
- Family: Cicindelidae
- Tribe: Cicindelini
- Subtribe: Cicindelina
- Genus: Cicindela
- Species: C. sylvatica

Binomial name
- Cicindela sylvatica Linnaeus, 1758

Subspecies
- Cicindela sylvatica ssp. rubescens; Cicindela sylvatica ssp. sylvatica

= Cicindela sylvatica =

Species of beetle

Cicindela sylvatica is a tiger beetle, commonly known as the wood tiger beetle or heath tiger beetle. It is the largest of the British tiger beetles with a length of between 15–19 millimetres (0.59–0.75 in). It is black in colour with a blue tinge, more pronounced on the underside, and sometimes appears with a bronze sheen.

The beetle occurs throughout Europe with the exception of the Mediterranean and the extreme north. In the UK, it is found in England between May and September in open pine woods and heathland. The beetle has been given priority status under the UK Biodiversity Action Plan (UK BAP) and has been included in the English Nature's Species Recovery Programme. The beetle population has declined in England by 65% over 40 years. The beetle's traditional stronghold is on the Dorset heaths where there are at least 4 populations, and also persists in two populations on the Surrey heaths.

The distribution list is Albania, Andorra, Austria, Belarus, Belgium, Bosnia Herzegovina, China, Croatia, the Czech Republic, Denmark, Estonia, Finland, mainland France, Germany, Great Britain, Hungary (doubtful), Ireland, Kaliningrad, Kazakhstan, Latvia, Liechtenstein, Lithuania, Luxembourg, Mongolia, the Netherlands, North Korea, North Macedonia, mainland Norway, Poland, Romania (doubtful), Russia, Slovakia, Slovenia, mainland Spain, Sweden, Turkey and Ukraine.
