= Porth Neigwl =

Bay in Gwynedd, Wales

Coordinates: 52.810°N 4.560°W

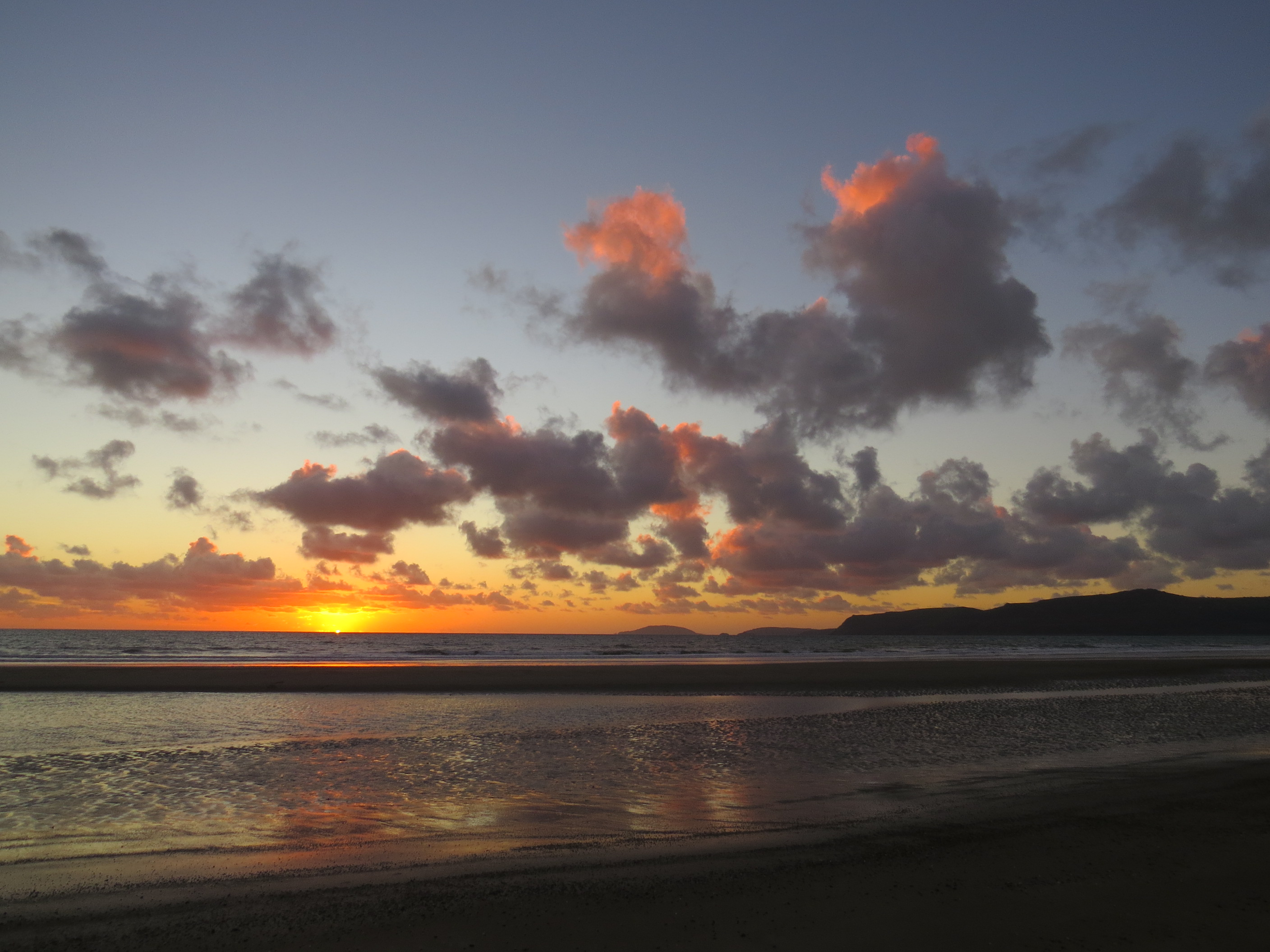
Sunset over Porth Neigwl

Porth Neigwl, also known in English as Hell's Mouth, is a broad bay, about 3 miles (5 km) wide, on the south coast of the Llŷn Peninsula in North Wales.

The bay faces south-west and lies between the headlands of Mynydd Rhiw to the west and Mynydd Cilan to the east. These craggy headlands have cliffs descending to the sea, and Porth Neigwl is said to be like a broad open mouth in the relief of south Llŷn.

The long, straight beach stretches for about 4 miles (7 km) between the two headlands. Behind the beach are grassy dunes which form a notable sea-marsh. The River Soch briefly runs parallel to the shore before turning inland near Llanengan (the only nearby village) towards Abersoch.

The bay is considered one of the most popular surf spots in Wales, with strong rip currents, shifting sandbars, and waves best suited to intermediate and advanced surfers.

There is a campground at Tai-morfa near Llanengan. The big waves make it a popular resort for surfing and sailboarding.

The area is a Site of Special Scientific Interest.
