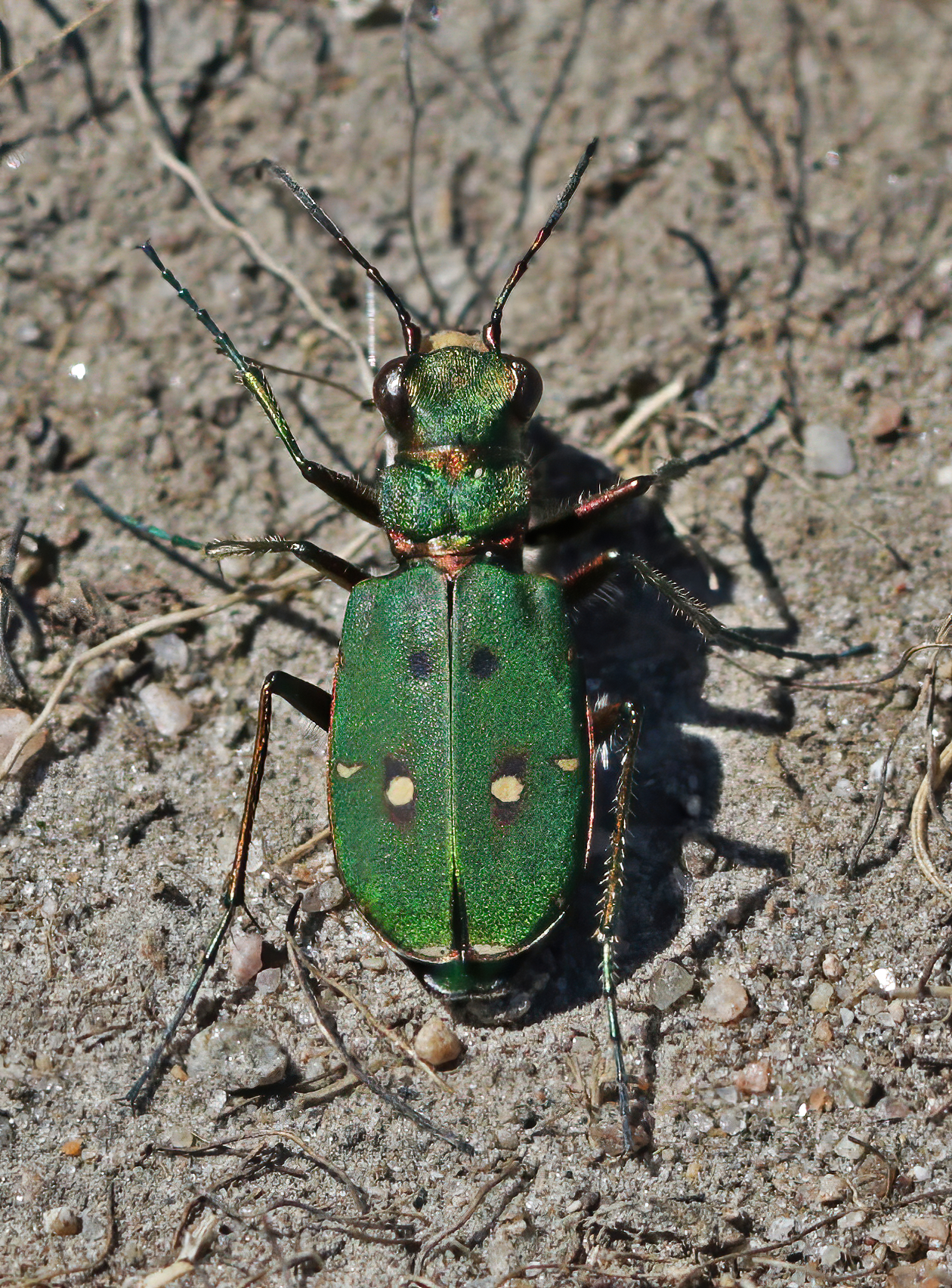

Scientific classification
- Kingdom: Animalia
- Phylum: Arthropoda
- Clade: Pancrustacea
- Class: Insecta
- Order: Coleoptera
- Suborder: Adephaga
- Family: Cicindelidae
- Genus: Cicindela
- Species: C. campestris

Binomial name
- Cicindela campestris Linnaeus, 1758

= Cicindela campestris =

Species of beetle

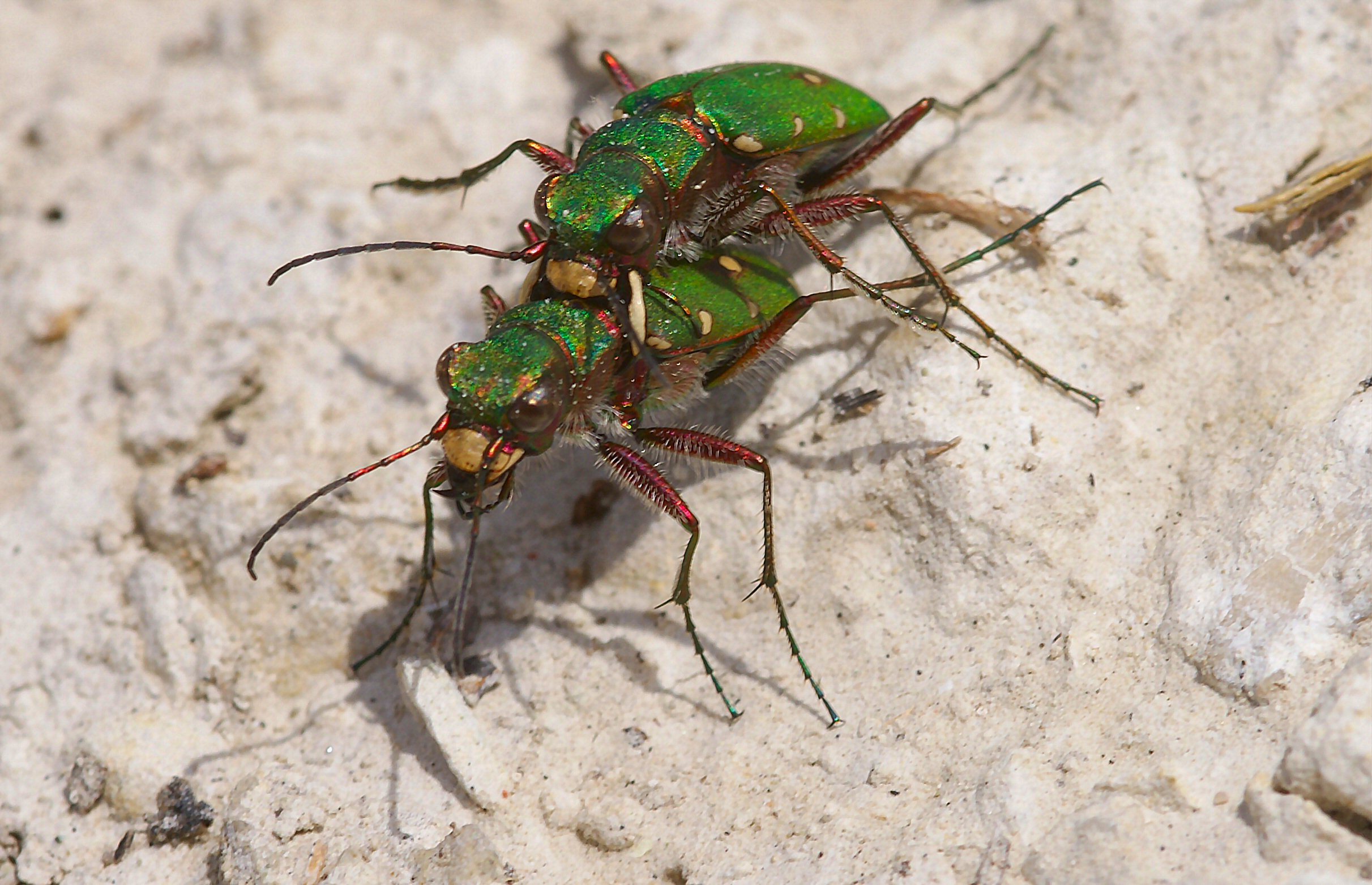
Mating pair. Male grips female at back of thorax with his (pale-coloured) mandibles

Cicindela campestris, commonly called the green tiger beetle, is a widespread Eurasian species of tiger beetle. It is the type species of the large genus Cicindela.

== Adult ==
Adults are typically 12–15 millimetres (0.47–0.59 in) long. The elytra and thorax are green, varying in tone from light to dark, spotted with cream-coloured patches, and in bright sunlight are somewhat iridescent. The eyes are blackish; the legs are brown with whitish hairs. The antennae are long and straight, not clubbed.

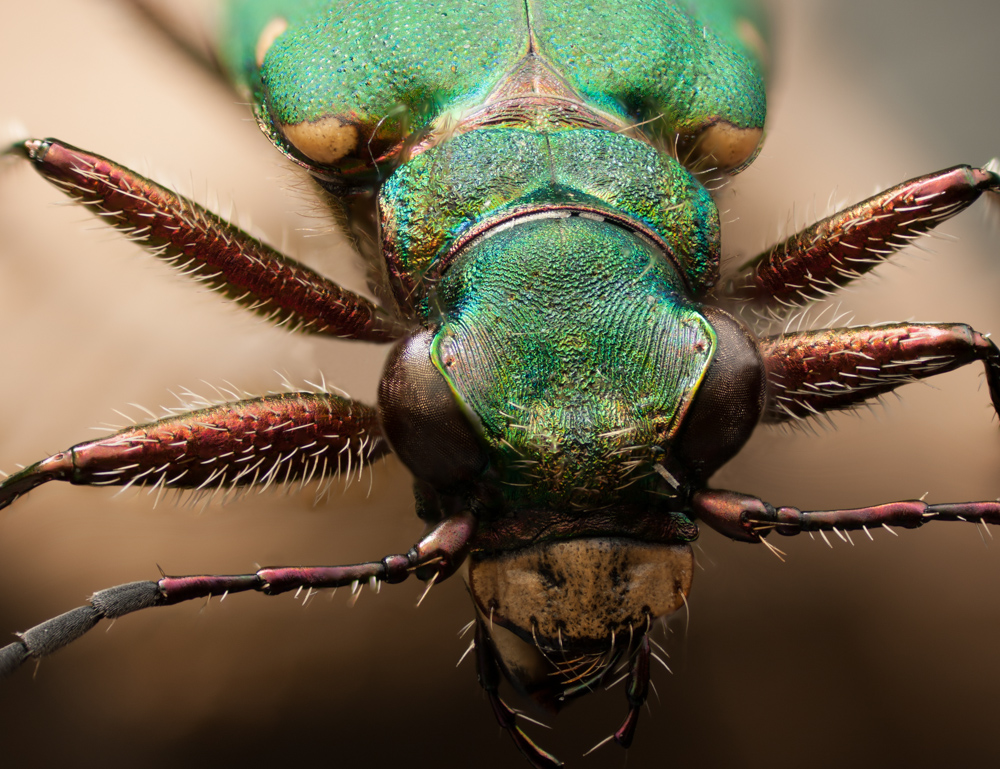
Close-up

== Behaviour ==
The adults are sun-loving. They live in places with dry soils (sandy or chalky), mostly between May and October at the latitude of Britain. Like other tiger beetles, they run fast on their long legs and are most often seen on bare ground, in Britain typically on heather moorland. They can fly fast, making a loud buzzing noise. It can run at speeds of 60 cm per second.

== Distribution ==
Cicindela campestris is distributed across Europe from Spain in the southwest to Finland in the northeast. Most records are from the UK, Germany, Austria and the south of Sweden. In Britain, records are mainly from dry sandy or heathy areas such as the heathlands of Surrey, Hampshire and Dorset, and the mountains and moorlands of the Scottish Highlands.

== Mounting and push-ups ==
Mating almost always involves the male mounting the female with quick, jerky movements. During the first few attempts at mating, the female pushes him away four or five times before the actual mating occurs. Two minutes before mating, the females release the pheromones through their pheromone glands. When the male mounts the female (which takes about 2 seconds), he grabs her by the space between the pronotum and the elytra, initiating a rough and violent mating, typical for some species of butterflies and others. The aedeagus initially locks and inserts only its tip into the female's orifice, and in large push-ups it is injected halfway.

There are two types of push-ups: large and small. Large push-ups reach up to 3 in 1 minute, but each mating session has a different number of large push-ups (there can be up to 5 or 7 in total). Before the end of the mating there is a long series of small push-ups in a two-minute range (which number is up to 37 push-ups), after which the so-called contact guarding begins. With each push-up, the female bends to the ground in a slight attempt to get out of the male's catch.

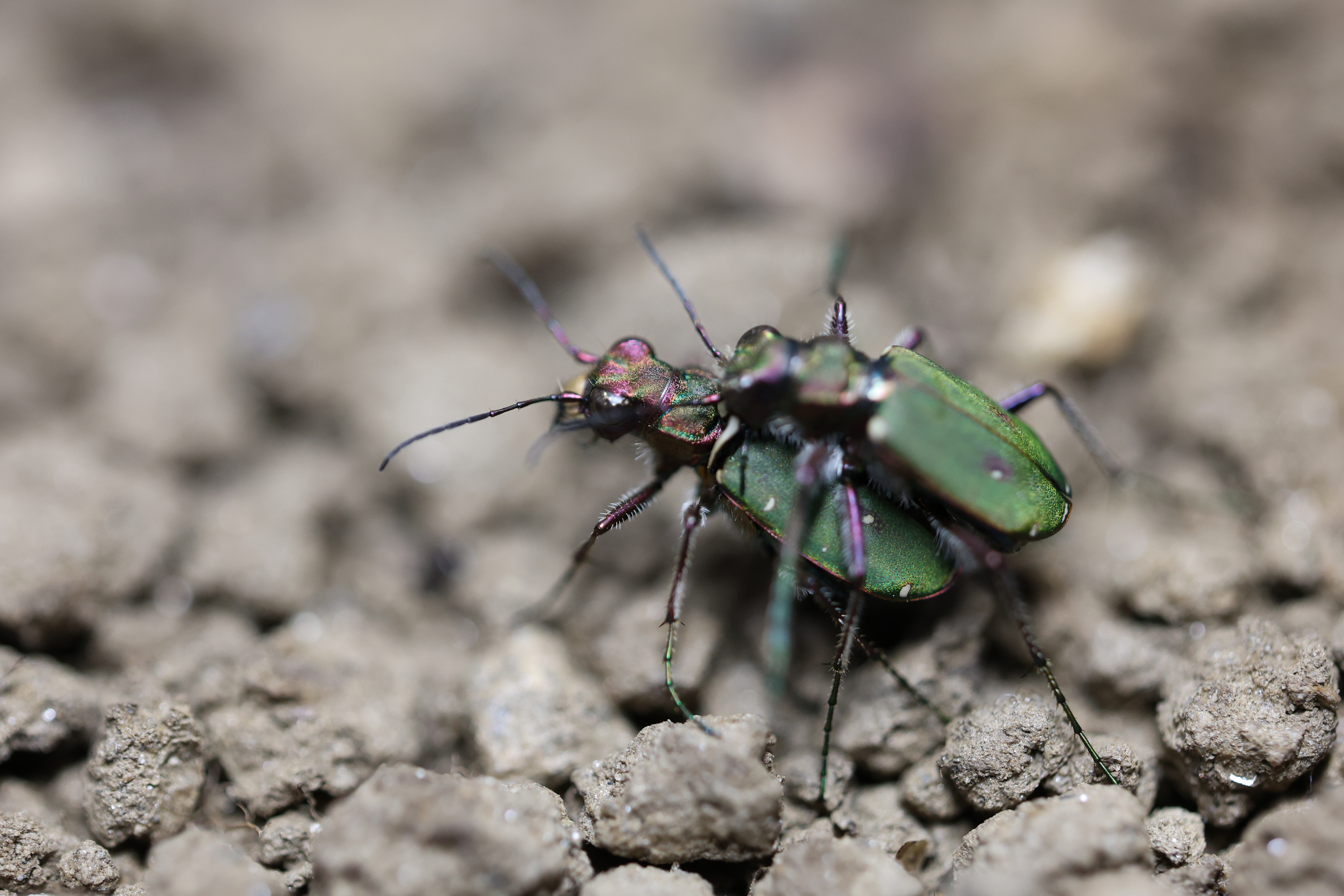
Cicindela campestris mating

== Actual mating ==
Mating couples can be seen from early to late April, but sometimes even later. According to studies, the mating takes from 7 to 20 minutes, with from 8 to 15 being the most successful. This is usually the duration of a single mating, but there can be multiple pairings (sometimes up to 10 per day).

== contact guarding ==
During this stage, the mating is already over, but the male stands holding the female with his mandibles to make sure that he will keep the female intact until the eggs are laid and ensure the survival of only his genes, so he guards her. This way he is sure that she will not mate with other males who will replace his sperm, but it also wastes a lot of time and chances of mating. This behavior lasts for 3.39.5 minutes. At the 4th minute of guarding, the female begins vigorous resistance by shaking to free herself from the male's grip.

== Eggs ==
The species is fastidious and lays its eggs in moist areas located in regions with dry clay or sandy soil. The eggs are laid 1-1.5 mm deep in holes and are sometimes covered with a grain of soil. The female lays several times per mating, and in each hole she lays one individual egg. The humidity of the place is about 64%. The egg is pale yellow and oblong, just under 1 mm in length. The eggs are laid towards the end of April. This species very rarely lays eggs in sand (only if found in coastal dunes).

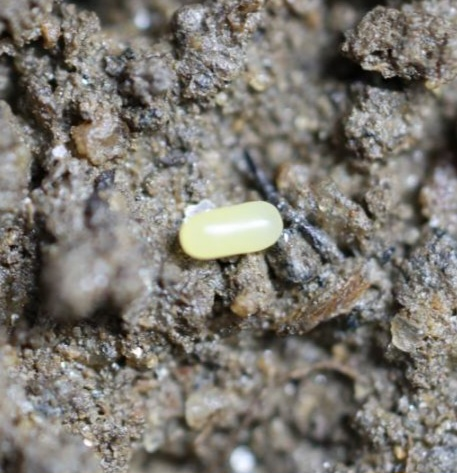
Egg of the Green tiger beetle

First, the soil is dug up and piled up behind the hole. After about a minute, the female inserts the end of her abdomen and then lays one egg. The hole is filled halfway and then another location is sought. The females accept from light to medium soil moisture. The incubation time for the eggs is 18–19 days.

== Early larval stages ==
The eggs hatch in mid-May. The larva is small and has a light abdomen and large mandibles. They reach length of about 9 mm. The first instar lasts for about 31 days.

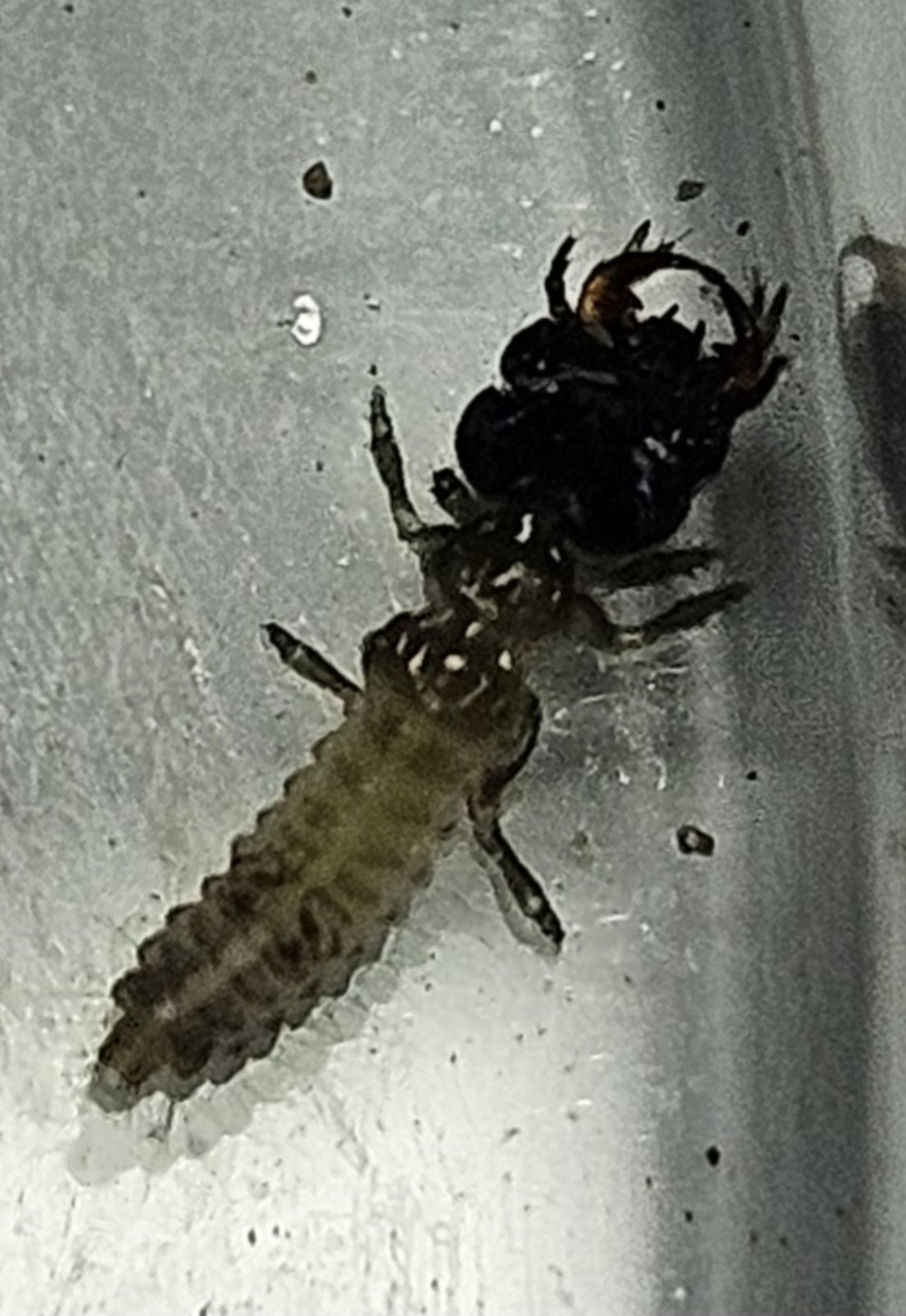
First instar larva of Cicindela campestris

== Second instar ==
Four days before molting to the second instar, the larva remains inactive until it sheds its exoskeleton. The second instar larva is about 14 mm long with pale abdomen (unlike the pale yellow color in the last instar). This stage continues for about 20 days.

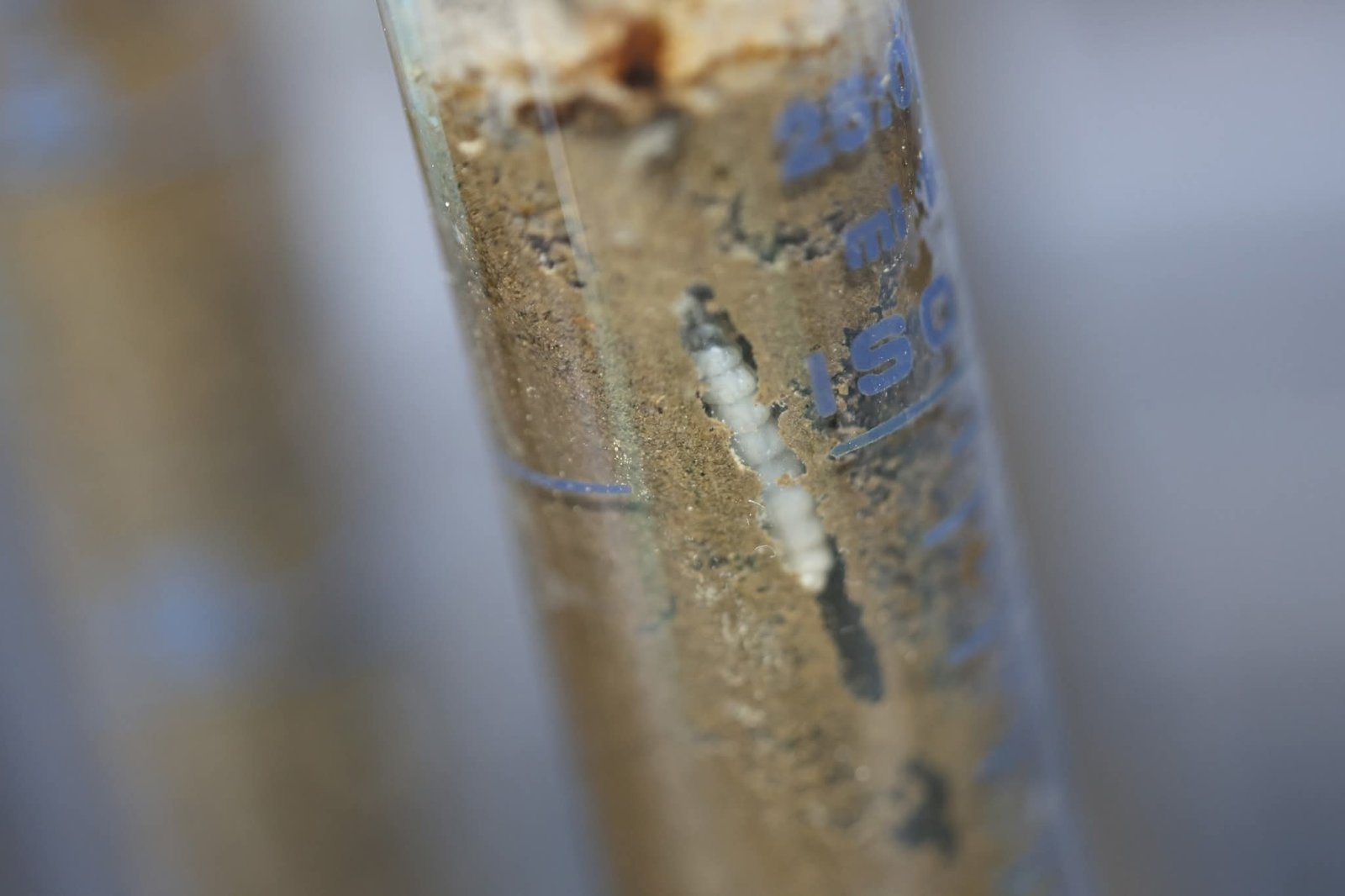
Larva in the 2nd stage

== Last instar and prepupa ==
In the last stage, the hole is usually 25 cm deep. The third stage, especially towards the end, has the typical pale yellow color of the abdomen for the species, without any spots. Upon completion of development about two to three days before turning into a pupa, the larva sits in its hole before expanding and digging deeper. The third stage lasts 20–21 days, and the larva will isolate itself upon completion of development and cover the exit of the hole with about 2 cm. of soil and during this time, until it prepares for the prepupal stat, it remains for about 3 days, during which very little activity and movement is observed. The larva mainly stays at the base of the hole and doesn't feed at all.

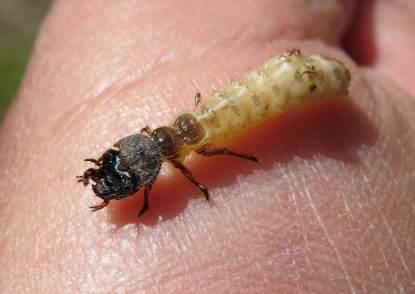
Fully developed larva

After about 4 days the larva molts into a pupa.

== Pupa ==
This stage takes about three weeks. The pupa is white, but as development progresses it may darken.

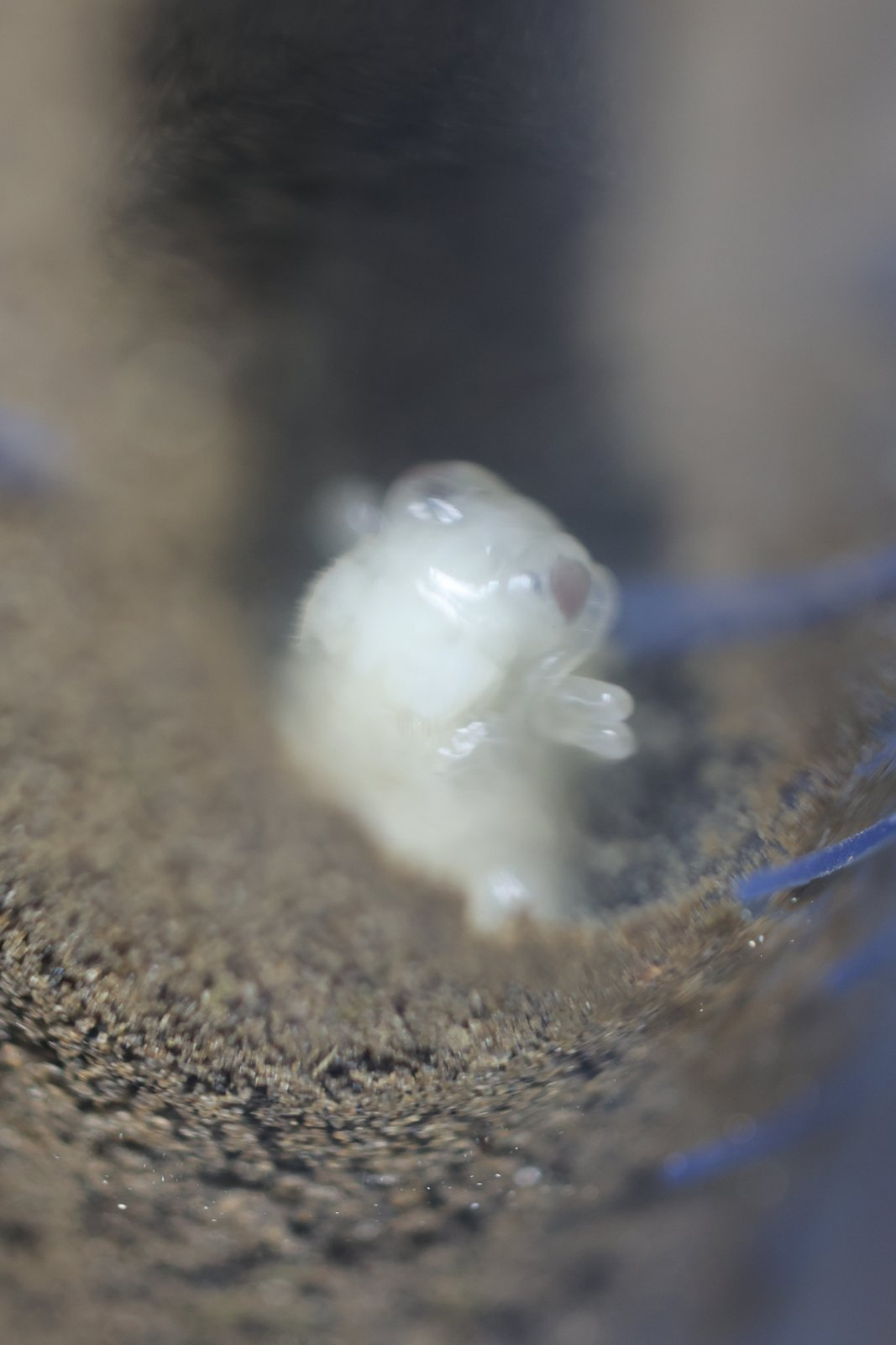
The pupa in its burrow

== The adult beetle ==
The adult beetle emerges from the pupa in autumn.

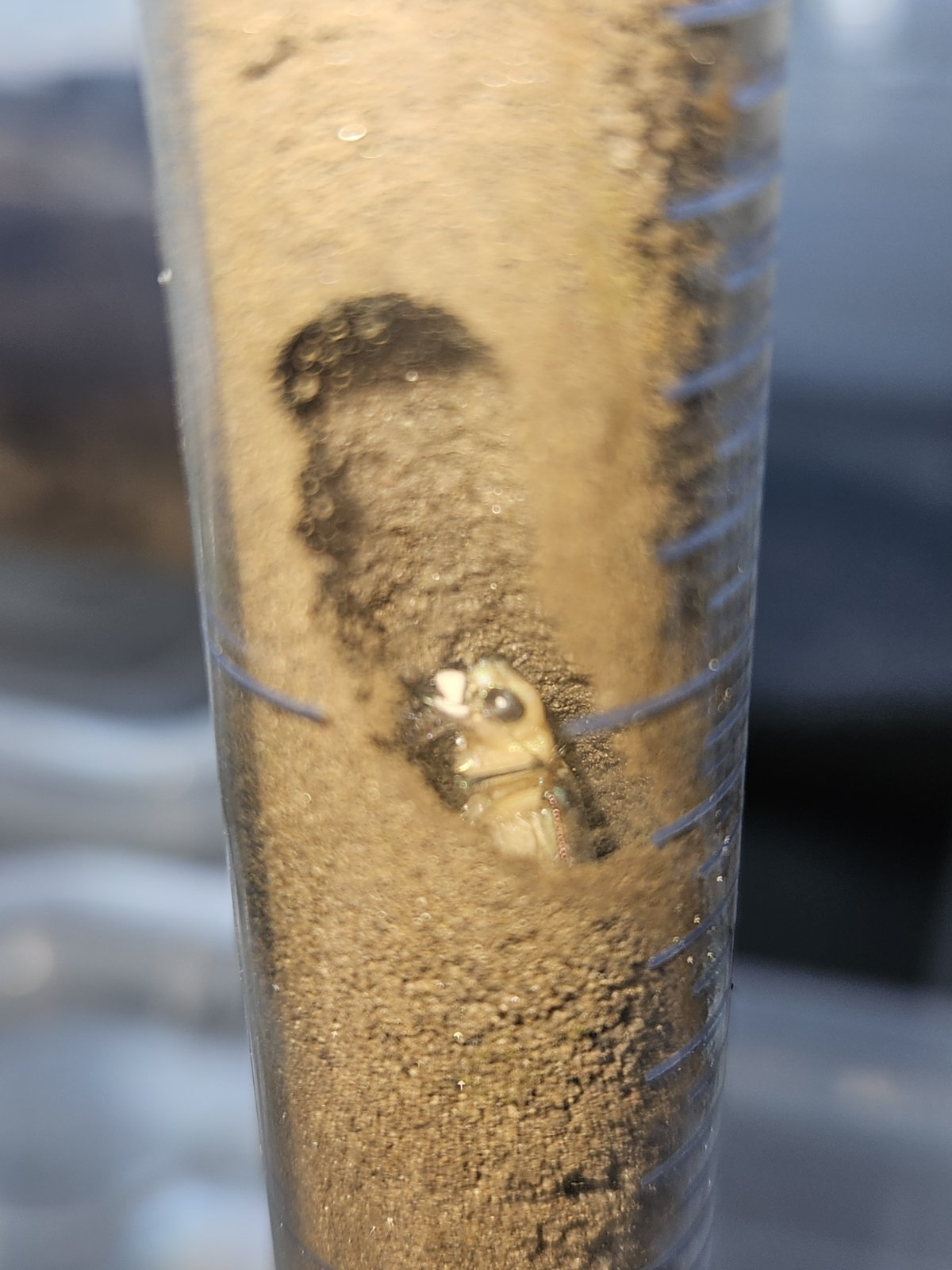
Newly-emerged beetle

== Subspecies ==
The species is divided into several subspecies:

- Cicindela campestris atlantis Mandl, 1944
- Cicindela campestris balearica Sydow, 1934
- Cicindela campestris cyprensis Hlisnikowsky, 1929
- Cicindela campestris nigrita Dejean, 1825
- Cicindela campestris olivieria Brullé, 1832
- Cicindela campestris palustris Motschulsky, 1840
- Cicindela campestris pontica Fischer von Waldheim, 1825
- Cicindela campestris saphyrina Gené, 1836
- Cicindela campestris siculorum Schilder, 1953
- Cicindela campestris suffriani Loew, 1943
- Cicindela campestris calabrica Mandl, 1944

== Ecology ==
The mollicute bacterium species Entomoplasma freundtii (Entomoplasmatales, Entomoplasmataceae) can be isolated from the green tiger beetle.
