= Abersoch =

Village in Gwynedd, Wales

Coordinates: 52.823°N 4.506°W

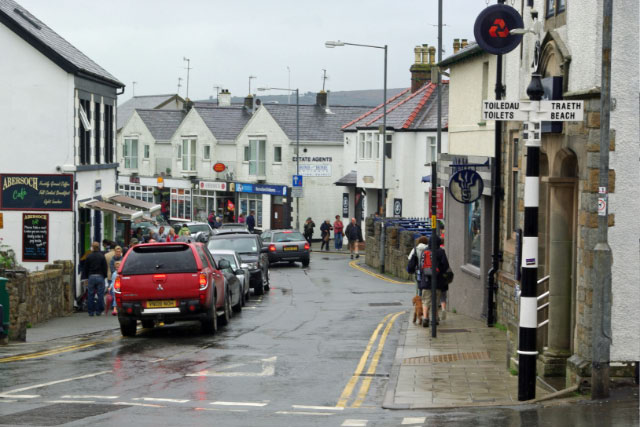
- Lôn Pen Cei (Pen Cei Road)

- Location within Gwynedd
- Population: 2,602 (2020)
- OS grid reference: SH312281
- Community: Llanengan
- Principal area: Gwynedd
- Preserved county: Caernarfonshire
- Country: Wales
- Sovereign state: United Kingdom
- Post town: Pwllheli
- Postcode district: LL53
- Dialling code: 01758
- Police: North Wales
- Fire: North Wales
- Ambulance: Welsh
- UK Parliament: Dwyfor Meirionnydd
- Senedd Cymru – Welsh Parliament: Gwynedd Maldwyn

Abersoch (Welsh pronunciation: [abɛrˈsoːχ]) is a village in the community of Llanengan in Gwynedd, Wales. It is a coastal seaside resort, with around 2,600 residents, on the east-facing south coast of the Llŷn Peninsula at the southern terminus of the A499. It is about 7 miles (11 km) south-west of Pwllheli and 27 miles (43 km) south-west of the county town of Caernarfon.

== Etymology ==
The village takes its name from the river Soch, which reaches the sea in the village. 'Aber' meaning 'estuary', gives us a literal translation of the 'Soch Estuary'. The name of the village is often rendered "Rabar" in the local Welsh dialect.

Pronunciation of Abersoch

== Archaeology ==
In the dry summer of 2018, aerial photography at Fach Farm, some 1100 metres north of the bridge over the Afon Soch, identified crop marks that were reported as a possible Roman fortlet. High-resolution geophysics in 2019 revealed evidence of a complex defended enclosure, unlike Roman military structures but suggesting a pre-Roman date.

== Tourism ==
Built upon the fishing trade, Abersoch was once a small village which grew exponentially after the 1950s with the rise of tourism. The fishing port which was guided by the Abersoch Fishermen's Society (which was replaced with the active Pysgotwyr Llŷn Fishermen's Association) is still being used for fishing, however it is no longer the village's major source of income.

It is now a tourist centre specialising in dinghy sailing and other watersports such as windsurfing and jet-skiing. Nearby Porth Neigwl is also popular for surfing; it can hold large swells in the winter which can reach 1.5 metres (4.9 ft); however, the prevailing south-westerly winds can affect quality.

The village had a lifeboat station from 1869 until 1931. A new inshore lifeboat station was opened in 1965.

Central Abersoch has a variety of small shops as well as bars, restaurants, cafes and hotels. Boat trips around St Tudwal's Islands (one of which is owned by the famous survival instructor, Bear Grylls) to see the seals and other wildlife are available from the village. Abersoch is also popular for its close proximity to Snowdonia National Park, with Snowdon being visible from Abersoch Bay on clear days. There is an 18-hole golf course.

Abersoch was named one of the best places to live in Wales in 2017.

Because of Abersoch's popularity with tourists, particularly from northwest England and the western Midlands, there has been an increase in the sale of holiday homes in the area, and of the conversion of old properties into holiday lets. This has led locals, through the YesCymru campaign, to protest against rising house prices which push families away from the coastal towns where they were raised, as a result of high numbers of holiday lets compared with low numbers of families, Abersoch primary school was forced to close. Gwynedd Council has called for the Welsh government to step in to limit the number of homes allotted to each area.

== Demographics ==
=== Country of birth ===
According to the 2011 UK Census, 97.2% of the population was born in the United Kingdom. Although situated in Wales, the majority of the village's population (51.1%) was born in England, with only 44.7% having been born in Wales.

=== Identity ===
The 2011 Census demonstrated that 60.4% of the population had no Welsh identity. 34.0% of the population identified themselves as Welsh only. The surrounding community of Llanengan is considerably less Anglicised.

=== Welsh language ===
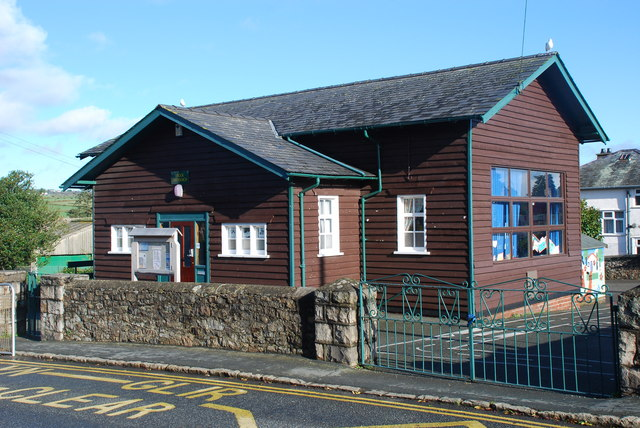
Ysgol Gynradd Abersoch Primary School prior to its forced closure

43.5% of the population aged 3 and over noted that they could speak Welsh. 52.1% noted that they had one or more skills in the Welsh language. Of those who were born in Wales, 85% of the population aged three and over noted that they could speak Welsh.

In June 2021, a Welsh language primary school 'Ysgol Abersoch' was threatened with closure, where the current school-children would be transferred to the closest school at 'Ysgol Sarn bach' which is located 1.4 miles away. In September 2021, despite over 200 objections from the public, the council unanimously voted to shut the school down. It closed at Christmas, 2021.

The neighbouring village of Sarn Bach has a Welsh-medium primary school for 3 to 11 year olds. As of 2017, the two schools between them educated 72 pupils. According to the latest Estyn reports conducted in 2017, 39% of pupils in Ysgol Abersoch primary school came from Welsh-speaking homes, with 47% of pupils of Sarn Bach pupils coming from homes where Welsh was spoken.

The closest specialist school to Abersoch is Ysgol Hafod Lon in Penrhyndeudraeth.

Ysgol Botwnnog, situated 5 miles (8.0 km) inland from Abersoch, provides Welsh-medium secondary education to pupils from the village.

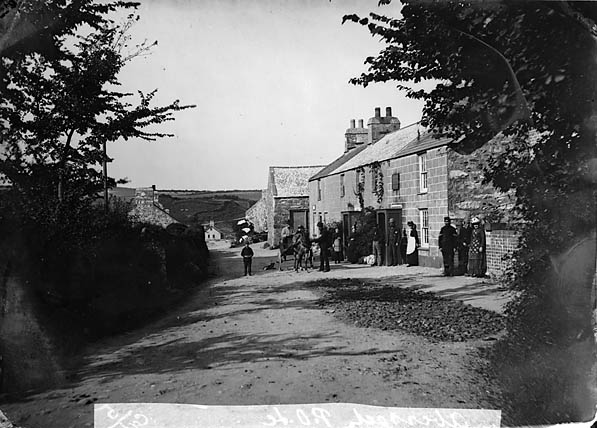
Abersoch Post Office c. 1885

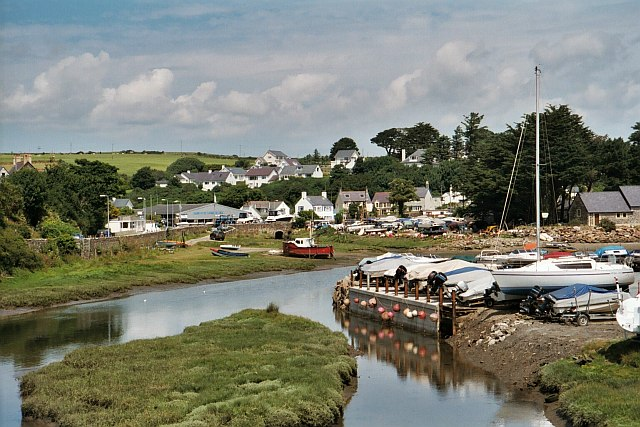
Harbwr Abersoch (Harbour)

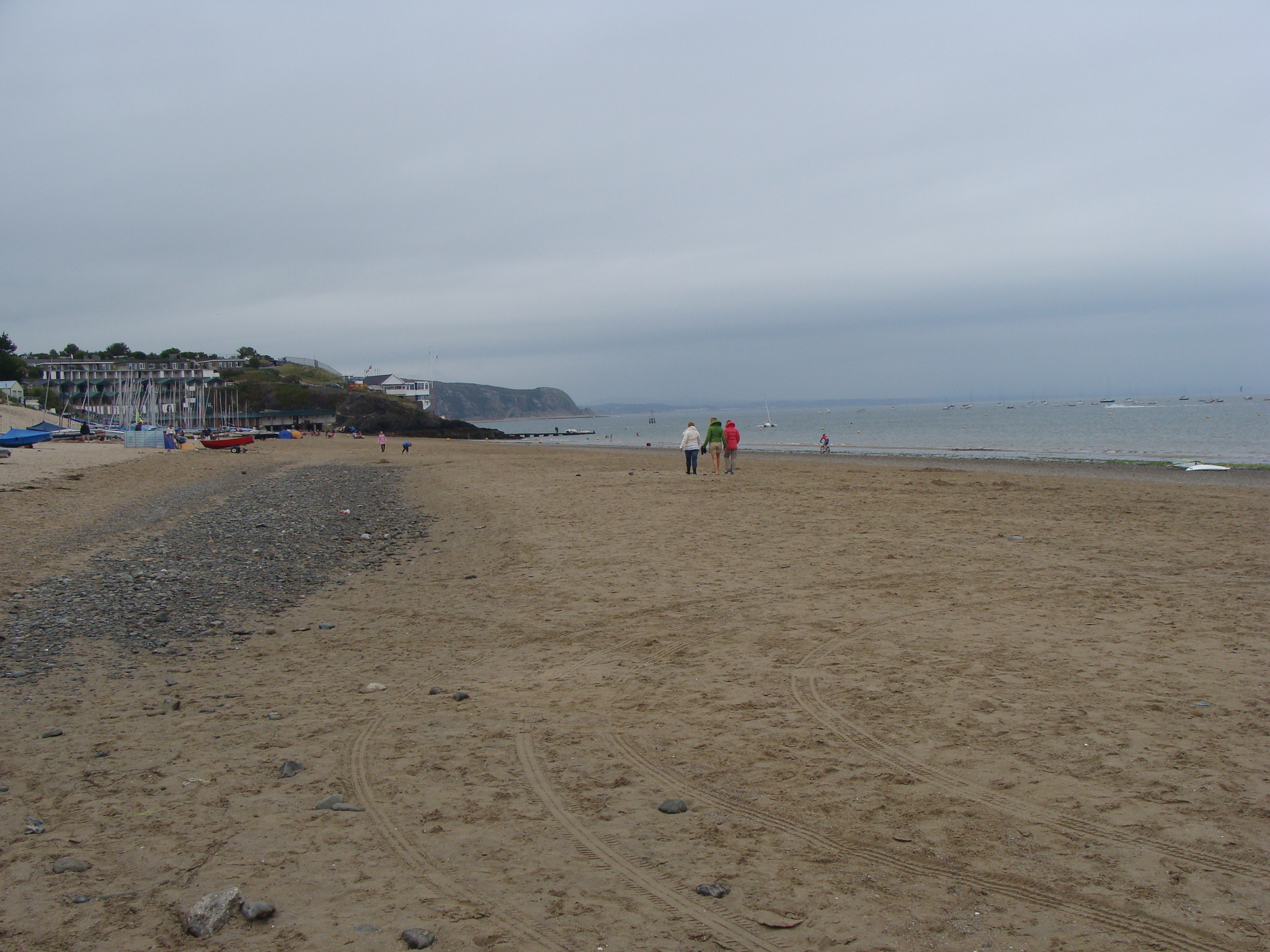
Porth Fawr beach

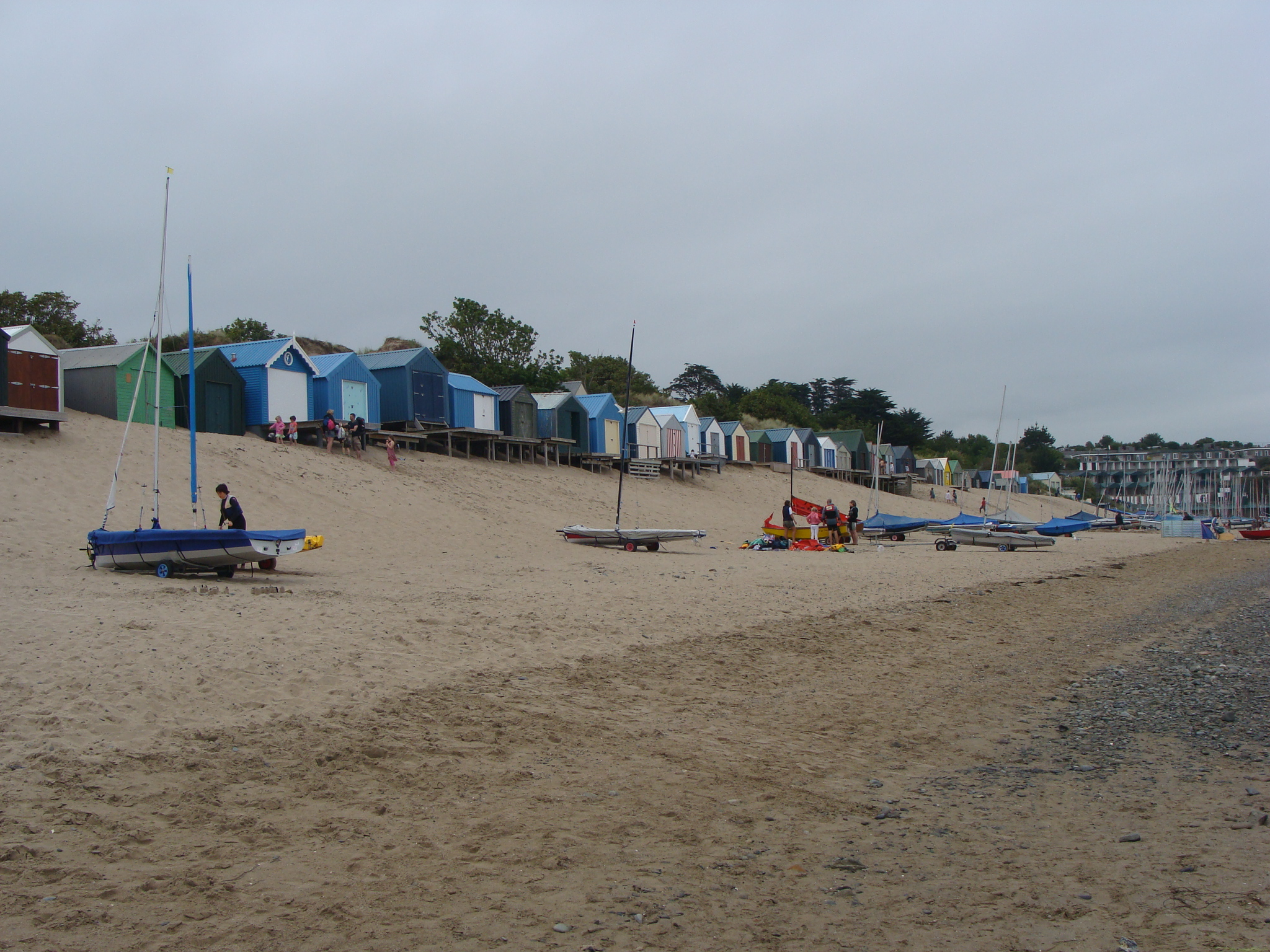
Bathing huts on Porth Fawr beach.
