= Saint Tudwal's Islands =

Pair of islands off the coast of Wales

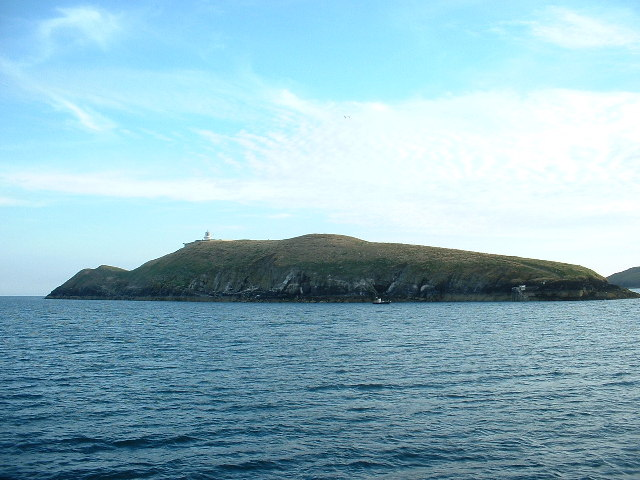
Saint Tudwal's Island West

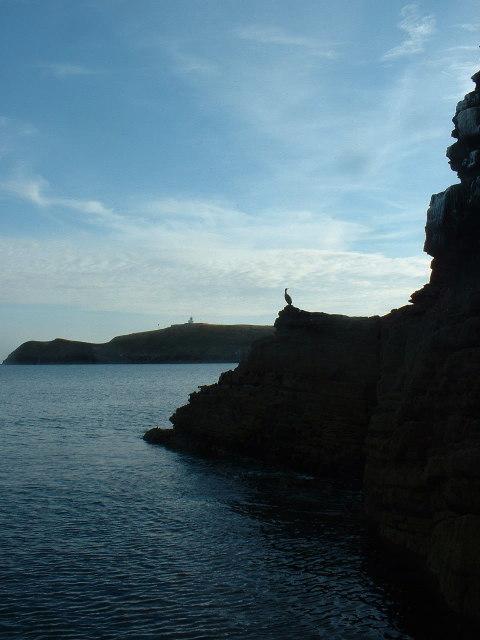
Saint Tudwal's Island East with West island in the background

Saint Tudwal's Islands (Welsh: Ynysoedd Tudwal) are a small archipelago lying south of Abersoch on the Llŷn Peninsula in North Wales, at the western end of Tremadog Bay. They were referred to as the Studwells in the early 19th century. The name of the islands derives from their traditional identification as the site of a hermitage used by Saint Tudwal during the 6th century. They are about 1 kilometre (0.6 mi) east of the southern tip of the Llŷn Peninsula.

There are two main islands: Saint Tudwal's Island West (Welsh: Ynys Tudwal Fawr)(52°47′56″N 4°28′18″W) and Saint Tudwal's Island East (Welsh: Ynys Tudwal Fach) (52°48′19″N 4°27′43″W), plus the Carreg y Trai rocks.

The islands are part of the Llŷn Area of Outstanding Natural Beauty and are known for their beaches and wildlife, having a variety of wild birds including razorbills, guillemots and choughs, and being a breeding site for grey seals. They are also popular for water sports. The western island houses the St Tudwal’s Lighthouse, and the eastern has the remains of a priory. The western island reaches 144 feet (44 metres) and is the higher of the two.

== Saint Tudwal's Island East ==
Saint Tudwal's Island East (Welsh: Ynys Tudwal Fach) is a grass covered, kidney-shaped island, about 550 yards (500 m) in length and 220 yards (200 m) in width. From 1991 it was owned by author Carla Lane until her death in May 2016.

The highest point on the island is 125 feet (38 m) above sea level. It is located just over 0.62 miles (1.00 km) off the Llŷn Peninsula in Gwynedd. The nearest settlement (apart from the lighthouse on Saint Tudwal's Island West) is Machroes. Small ships sail from the nearby town of Abersoch to take passengers to view the wildlife. The island is believed to be the original hermitage of Saint Tudwal, which is presumably where its name comes from. The remains of a priory, referred to in the 1291 tax rolls, are on its eastern side.

== Saint Tudwal's Island West ==
The West island is 650 metres (710 yd) long and 167 metres (183 yd) at its widest point. It was sold into private ownership in 1935. In 2001 it was purchased by the adventurer Bear Grylls for £95,000. He holidays on the island, living in the former lighthouse keeper's cottage. On 22 August 2013 it was reported that he was facing a planning investigation by Gwynedd Council, after installing a slide into the sea. He later took the slide down, saying it was never intended to be permanent and that he would clear it with the council before using it again. In 2015 he gained planning permission to build a 129 metre slipway, though construction did not begin until April 2021.
