= List of islands of England =

This is a list of islands of England (excluding the mainland which is itself a part of the island of Great Britain), as well as a table of the largest English islands by area and by population.

== Islands by type and name ==
=== Offshore and inshore islands ===
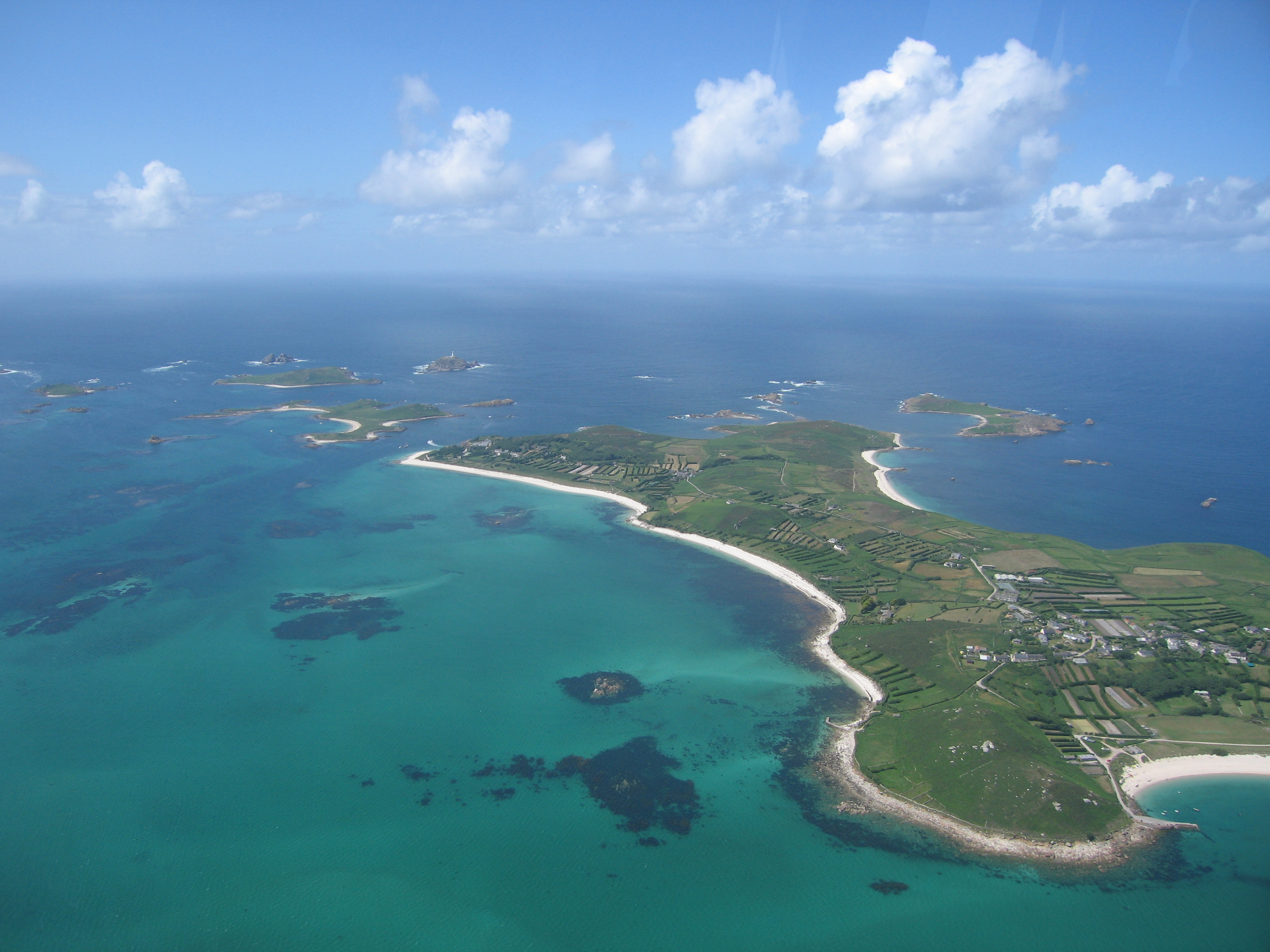
St Martin's, The Isles of Scilly

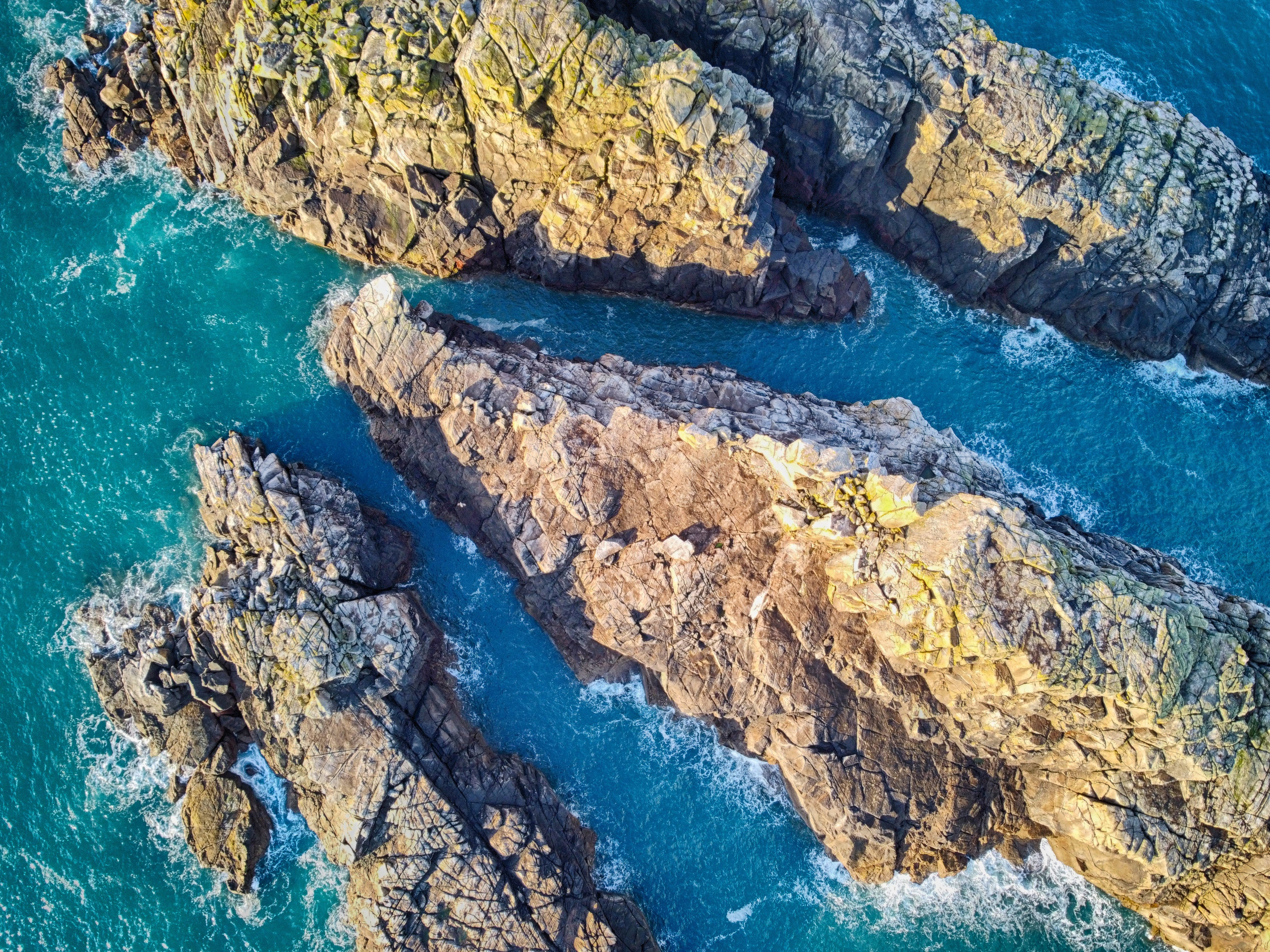
Men-a-Vaur, England

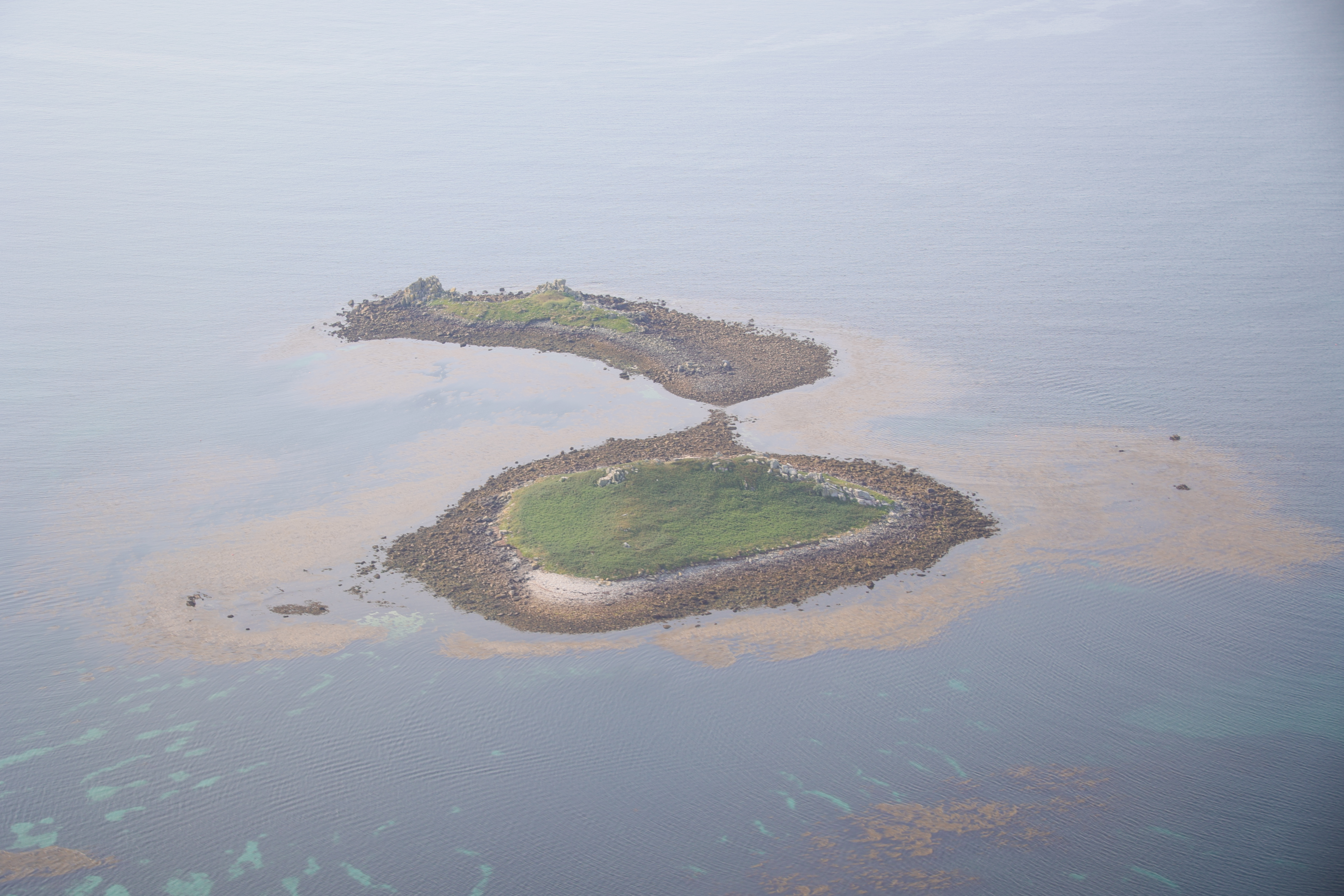
Aerial view of Scilly Islands

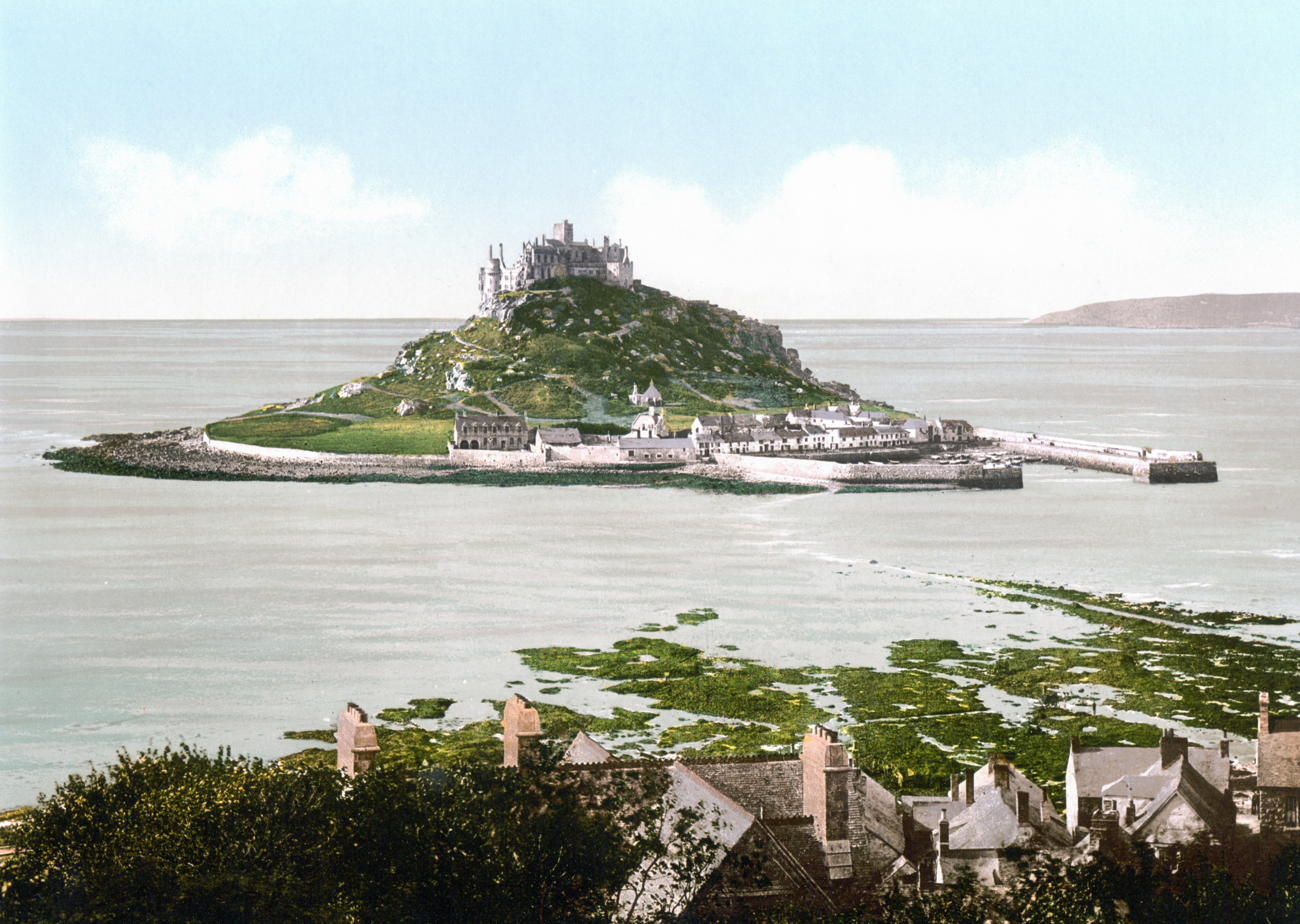
St Michael's Mount, Cornwall

To group islands by their geographical region, sort the table by "Island Group/Location" (click the icon by the column heading).

Name	Group/location
Annet	Isles of Scilly
Asparagus Island	Cornwall
Baker's Island	Langstone Harbour
Birnbeck Island	Severn Estuary
Black Nab	Saltwick Bay, Whitby
Brownsea Island	Poole Harbour
Bryher	Isles of Scilly
Burgh Island	Devon
Burnt Island	Isles of Scilly
Burntwick Island	Medway Estuary
Burrow Island	Portsmouth Harbour
Canvey Island	Thames Estuary
Chapel Island	Islands of Furness
Cindery Island	Essex
Cobmarsh Island	Essex
Coquet Island	Northumberland
Crow Island	Isles of Scilly
Deadman's Island	Medway Estuary
Drake's Island	Devon
Dova Haw	Islands of Furness
English Island	Isles of Scilly
Foulness Island	Essex
Foulney Island	Islands of Furness
Fowley Island	Chichester Harbour
Furzey Island	Poole Harbour
Gigger's Island	Poole Harbour
Godrevy Island	Cornwall
The Carracks	Cornwall
Gorregan	Isles of Scilly
Great Arthur	Isles of Scilly
Great Cob Island	Essex
Great Ganinick	Isles of Scilly
Great Ganilly	Isles of Scilly
Great Innisvouls	Isles of Scilly
Great Mew Stone	Devon
Green Island	Isles of Scilly
Green Island	Poole Harbour
Gugh	Isles of Scilly
Gull Island	Hampshire
Guther's Island	Isles of Scilly
Gweal	Isles of Scilly
Hanjague	Isles of Scilly
Havengore Island	Essex
Havergate Island	Suffolk
Hayling Island	Chichester Harbour
Headin Haw	Islands of Furness
Hedge-end Island	Essex
Hilbre Island	Wirral
Horsea Island	Portsmouth Harbour
Horsey Island	Essex
Inner Farne	Farne Islands
Lindisfarne	Northumberland
Little Arthur	Isles of Scilly
Little Eye	Wirral
Little Ganinick	Isles of Scilly
Little Ganilly	Isles of Scilly
Little Innisvouls	Isles of Scilly
Longships	Land's End
Long Island	Poole Harbour
Long Island	Langstone Harbour
Looe Island	Cornwall
Lower Horse	Essex
Lothingland	Suffolk and Norfolk
Lundy	Bristol Channel
Menawethan	Isles of Scilly
Merrick Island	Isles of Scilly
Mersea Island	Essex
Middle Eye	Wirral
Mullion Island	Cornwall
New England Island	Essex
Nornour	Isles of Scilly
North Binness Island	Langstone Harbour
Northey Island	Essex
Old Harry Rocks	Dorset
The Pinnacle	Dorset
Little Pinnacle	Dorset
The Needles	Dorset
Otter Island	Poole Harbour
Pergins Island	Poole Harbour
Osea Island	Essex
Outer Trial Bank	Lincolnshire
Pewit Island	Essex
Pewit Island	Portsmouth Harbour
Piel Island	Islands of Furness
Pilsey Island	Chichester Harbour
Plumb Island	Isles of Scilly
Portsea Island	Hampshire
Potton Island	Essex
Puffin Island	Isles of Scilly
Ragged Island	Isles of Scilly
Ramsey Island	Islands of Furness
Read's Island	Humber estuary
Roa Island	Islands of Furness
Rosevear	Isles of Scilly
Round Island	Isles of Scilly
Round Island	Poole Harbour
Drove Island	Poole Harbour
Stone Island	Poole Harbour
Rushley Island	Essex
Scolt Head Island	Norfolk
St Agnes	Isles of Scilly
St Clement's Isle	Cornwall
St Helen's	Isles of Scilly
St Martin's	Isles of Scilly
St Mary's	Isles of Scilly
St Michael's Mount	Cornwall
St Mary's Island	Tyne and Wear
Samson	Isles of Scilly
Sheep Island	Islands of Furness
Isle of Sheppey	Thames Estuary
Skipper's Island	Essex
South Binness Island	Langstone Harbour
Staple Island	Farne Islands
Steep Holm	Bristol Channel
Stert Island	Somerset
Stony Island	Isles of Scilly
Teän	Isles of Scilly
Thatcher Rock	Devon
Thorney Island	Chichester Harbour
Toll's Island	Isles of Scilly
Tresco	Isles of Scilly
Two Tree Island	Thames Estuary
Wallasea Island	Essex
Walney Island	Islands of Furness
Wamses Island	Farne Islands
Whale Island	Portsmouth Harbour
White Island	Isles of Scilly
Whitton Island	Humber estuary
Isle of Wight	English Channel

=== Inland islands ===
There are numerous islands within freshwater lakes and rivers in England. They are most numerous in the Lake District but other concentrations occur within the Norfolk Broads, some major reservoirs and principal rivers.

==== In the Lake District ====
To group islands by lake, sort the table by "Lake" (click the icon by the column heading).

Name	Lake
Belle Isle	Windermere
Blake Holme	Windermere
Cherry Holm	Ullswater
Crow Holme	Windermere
Deergarth How Island	Thirlmere
Derwent Isle	Derwent Water
Fir Island	Coniston Water
Grass Holme	Windermere
Hawes How Island	Thirlmere
Hen Holme	Windermere
Heron Island	Rydal Water
Holme Crag	Windermere
Holme Islands	Crummock Water
Lady Holme	Windermere
Lillies of the Valley	Windermere
Ling Holme	Windermere
Lingy Holm	Ullswater
Little Isle	Rydal Water
Lord's Island	Derwent Water
Maiden Holme	Windermere
Norfolk Island	Ullswater
Oak Island	Coniston Water
Otter Island	Derwent Water
Otterbield Island	Derwent Water
Peel Island	Coniston Water
Ramp Holme	Windermere
Rampsholme Island	Derwent Water
Rough Holme	Windermere
Scale Island	Crummock Water
Silver Holme	Windermere
St Herbert's Island	Derwent Water
Thompson's Holme	Windermere
Unnamed island	Elter Water
Grasmere Island	Grasmere
Wall Holm	Ullswater
Watness Coy	Devoke Water
Wood Howe	Haweswater Reservoir
Woodhouse Islands	Crummock Water

==== In the River Thames ====
See: Islands in the River Thames

==== Inland islands elsewhere in England ====
To group islands by location, sort the table by "Location" (click the icon by the column heading).

Name	Location
Newark Island	River Trent
Alney Island	River Severn
Big Island	Carsington Water
Bird Island	Stocks Reservoir, Lancashire
Bridgemarsh Island	River Crouch, Essex
Denny Island	Chew Valley Lake
Flat Island	Carsington Water
Haddiscoe Island (or Chedgrave Island or simply 'The Island')	Between River Waveney, River Yare and New Cut
Horseshoe Island	Carsington Water
Lady Island	Hornsea Mere
Millfields Island	Carsington Water
Peasholm Island	Peasholm Lake, Scarborough
Pleasure Island	Hickling Broad, Norfolk
Sailing Club Island	Carsington Water
Shiningford Island	Carsington Water
Stanlow Island	Merseyside, Manchester Ship Canal
Swan Island	Hornsea Mere
Willow Island	Stocks Reservoir, Lancashire
Pomona Island	Between,Manchester Ship Canal, Bridgewater Canal

== Largest islands ==
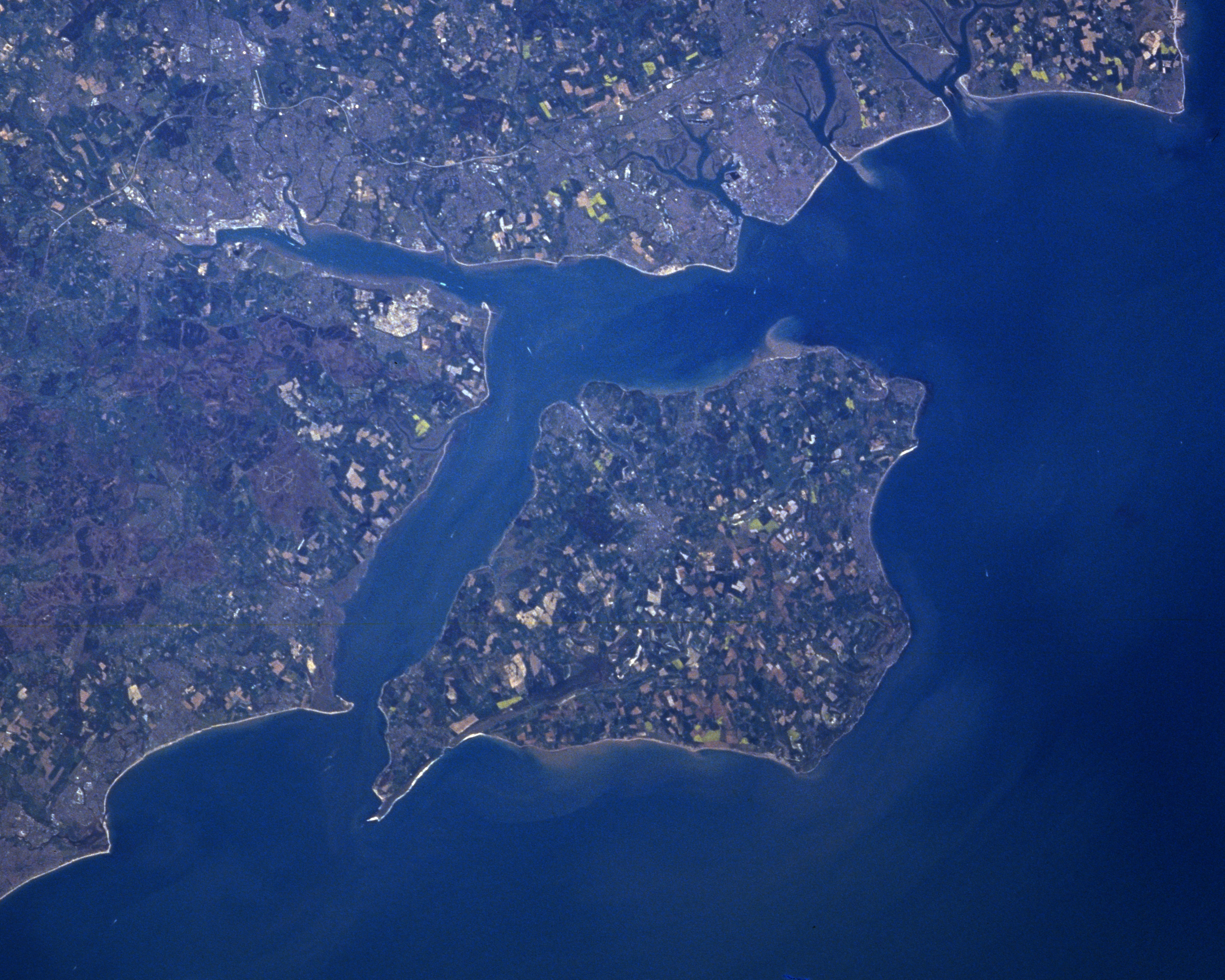
The Isle of Wight, with Portsea Island and Hayling Island also visible in the top right

Rank	Island	Area	
Rank	Island	(sq mi)	(km^{2})
1	Isle of Wight	146.77	380.15
2	Isle of Sheppey	34.45	89.25
3	Hayling Island	12.00	30.00
4	Foulness Island	11.31	29.30
5	Portsea Island	9.47	24.54
6	Canvey Island	6.96	18.04
7	Mersea Island	6.92	17.94
8	Walney Island	5.12	13.27
9	Wallasea Island	4.11	10.65
10	St Mary's	2.54	6.58
11	Lundy	1.72	4.45
12	Tresco	1.15	2.97
13	St Martin's	0.92	0.38
14	St Agnes	0.57	1.48
15	Bryher	0.51	1.34

== Most populous islands ==
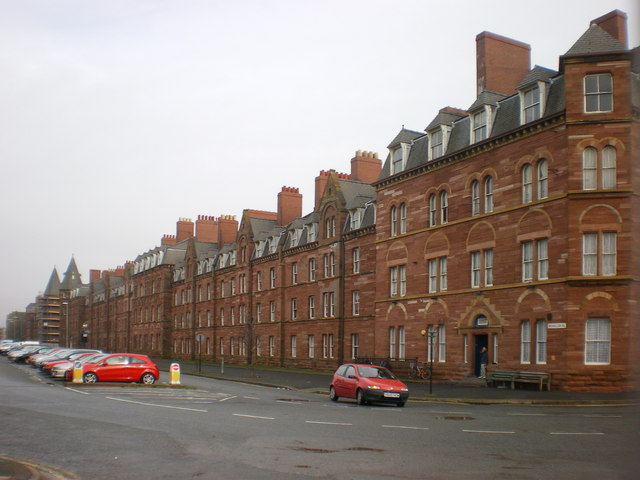
Many of the residents of Barrow Island live in traditional tenement blocks

Rank	Island	Population (2011 UK census)
1	Portsea Island	207,100
2	Isle of Wight	141,538
3	Isle of Sheppey	40,300
4	Canvey Island	38,170
5	Hayling Island	17,379
6	Walney Island	10,651
7	Mersea Island	about 7,200
8	Barrow Island	2,616
9	St Mary's	1,668
10	Thorney Island	1,079
11	Foulness Island	151
12	Tresco	180
13	Lindisfarne	162
14	St Martin's	142
15	Roa Island	about 100
16	Bryher	92
17	St Agnes	70
18	St Michael's Mount	35
19	Brownsea Island	30
20	Lundy	about 28
21	Whale Island	17
22	Burgh Island	about 12
23	Piel Island	4
24	Gugh	3
25	Horsey Island	Unknown
	Total	396,447

== Places called "island" or "isle" that are not islands ==
Some places in the British Isles are called islands or isles, but are not. Some of these were formerly islands surrounded by marshland. Others are peninsulas or just coastal settlements. They include:

- Isle of Athelney
- Isle of Axholme
- Barrow Island
- Brown's Island, Rutland Water
- Cobholm Island, part of Great Yarmouth
- Isle of Dogs
- Isle of Elmley (part of Sheppey)
- Isle of Ely
- Isle of Grain
- Isle of Harty (part of Sheppey)
- Isle of Oxney
- Isle of Portland
- Isle of Purbeck
- Kelham Island
- Ramsey Island
- Spike Island
- Stones Island, Carsington Water, Derbyshire
- Sunk Island
- Isle of Thanet, formerly separated by the Wantsum Channel
- The Isle, within tight loop of the River Severn, Shropshire
- The Island
- Thorney Island, Cambridgeshire
- Turbo Island (a bit a concrete in Stokes Croft in Bristol)
- Isle of Wedmore
- Fish Island, London

== See also ==
- List of islands of Scotland
- List of islands of Wales
- List of islands of Ireland
- List of islands of the British Isles
- List of islands of the United Kingdom
