= Tidal island =

Island accessible by foot at low tide

Diagram of tidal island at low tide and high tide

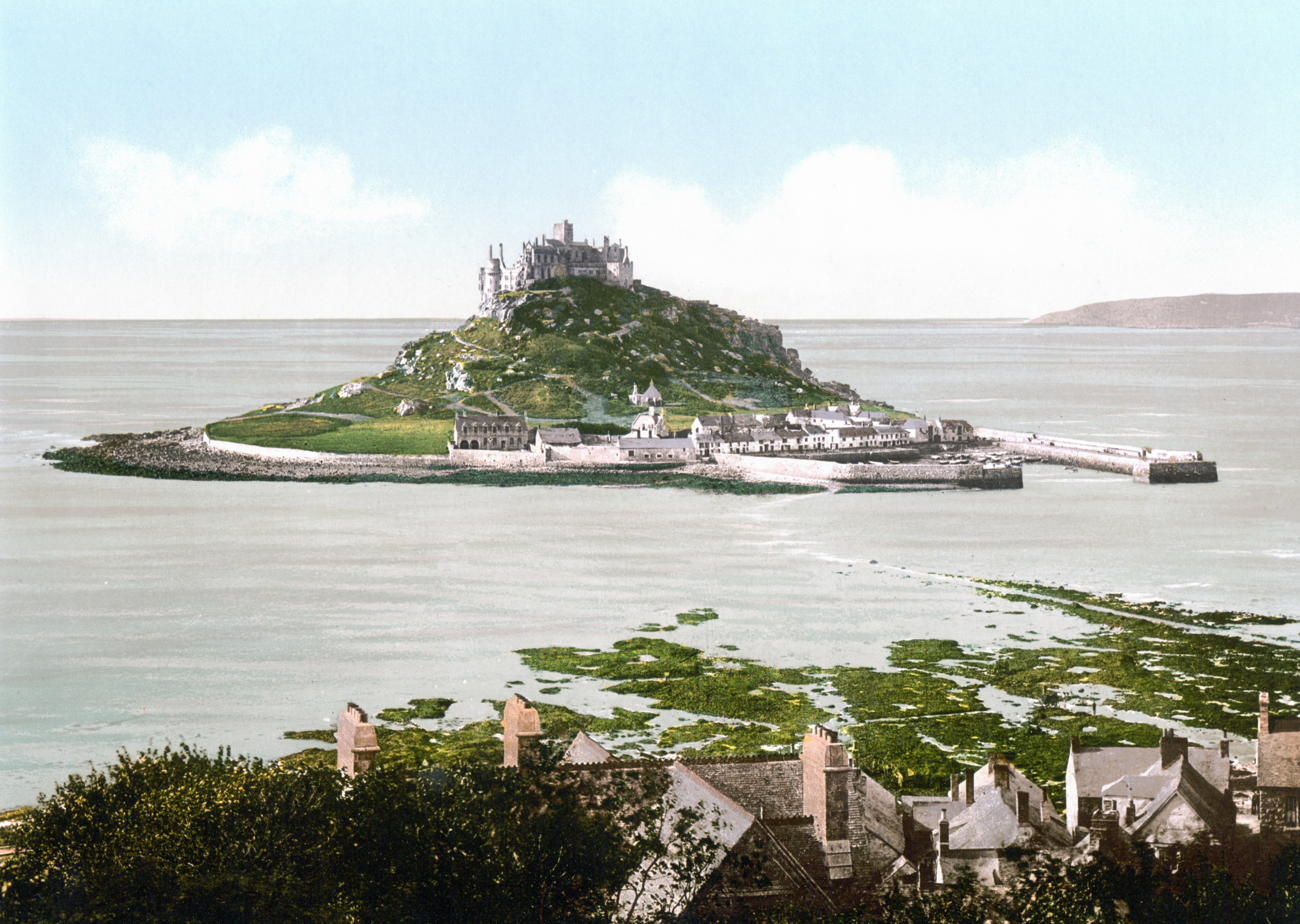
St Michael's Mount, Cornwall, at high tide, c. 1900

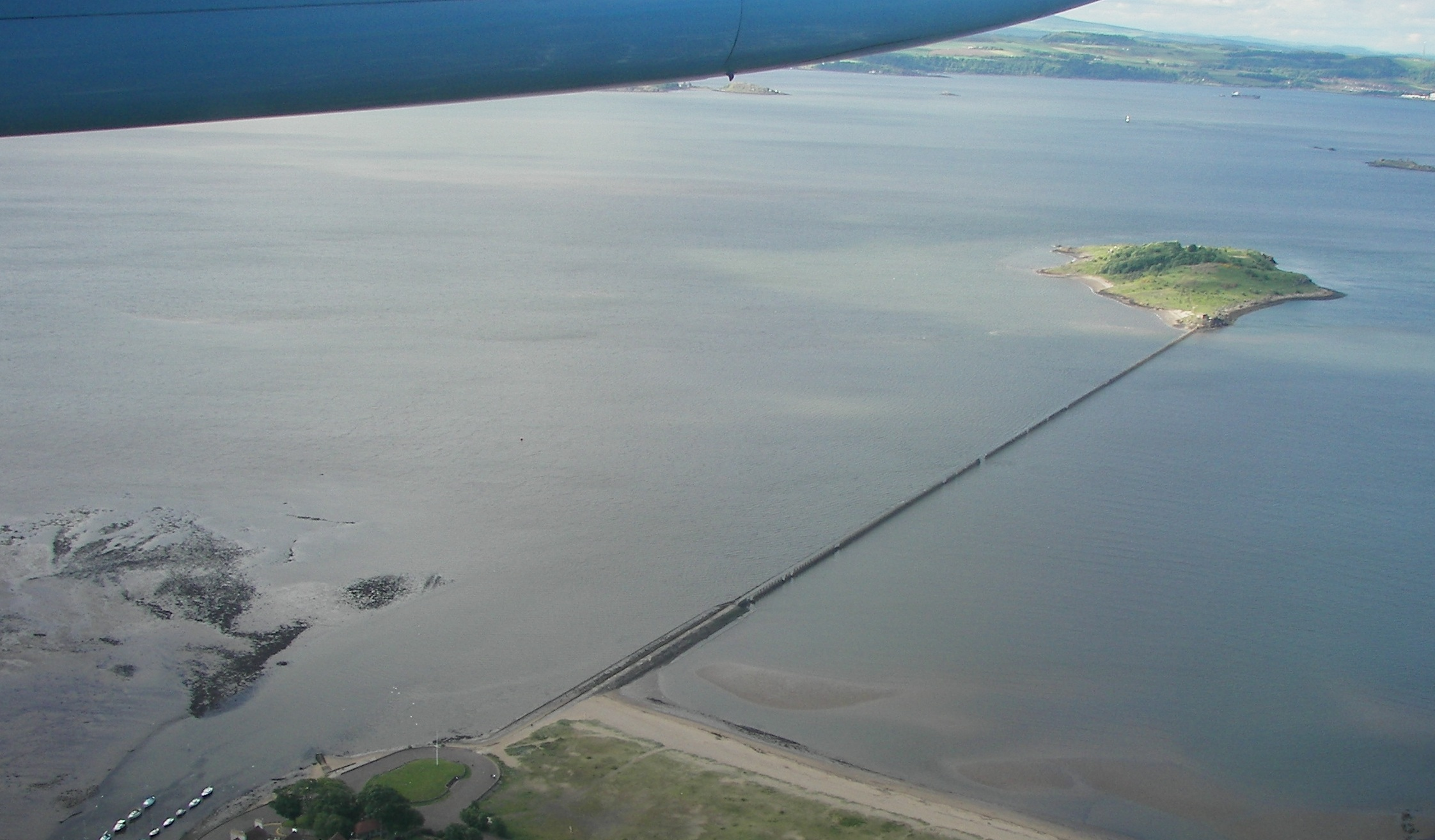
Cramond Island, Scotland, at high tide: the causeway is submerged, but the anti-boat pylons are still visible

A tidal island is a raised area of land within a body of water, which is connected to the larger mainland by a natural isthmus or man-made causeway that is exposed at low tide and submerged at high tide, causing the land to switch between being a promontory/peninsula and an island depending on tidal conditions.

Because of the mystique surrounding tidal islands, many of them have been sites of religious worship, such as Mont-Saint-Michel with its Benedictine abbey. Tidal islands are also commonly the sites of fortresses because of the natural barrier created by the tidal channel.

== List of tidal islands ==
=== Asia ===
==== Hong Kong ====
- Ma Shi Chau in Tai Po District, northeastern New Territories, within the Tolo Harbour
- Kiu Tau Island in Sai Kung

==== Iran ====
- Naaz islands in the Persian Gulf, southern seashore of Qeshm island

==== Japan ====
- Enoshima, in Sagami Bay, Kanagawa Prefecture

==== Taiwan ====
- Kueibishan in Penghu
- Jiangong Islet in Kinmen

==== South Korea ====
- Jindo Island and Modo Island in southwest South Korea
- Jebudo in the west

=== Europe ===
==== Denmark ====
- Mandø Island – on Denmark's western coast
- Knudshoved Island – north of Vordingborg on southern Zealand, Denmark

==== Denmark/Germany ====
- The Halligen in the North Frisian Islands, Denmark/Germany

==== France ====
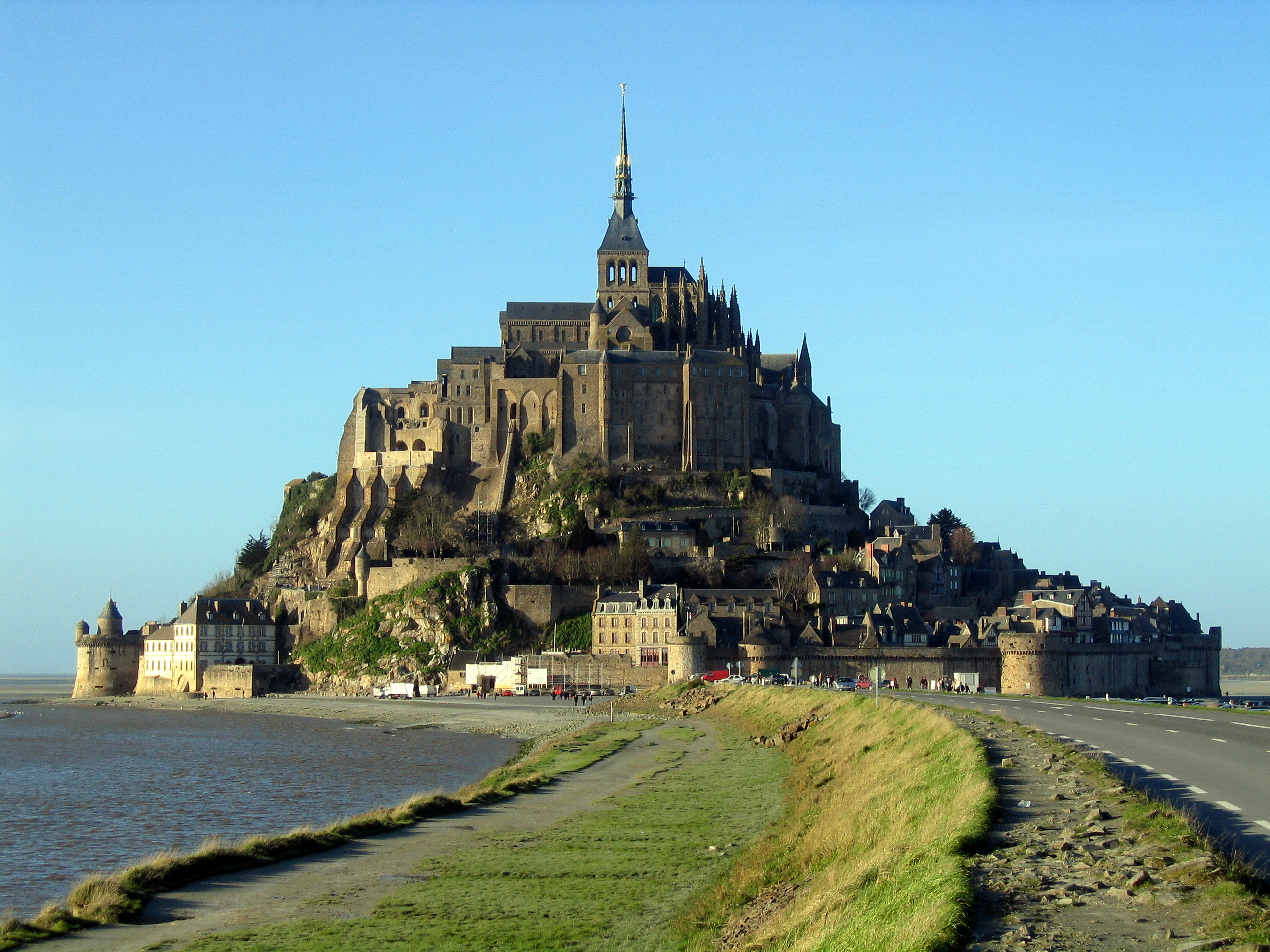
Mont Saint-Michel in Normandy

- Île Aganton in Brittany
- Île Madame in Charente-Maritime
- Île de Noirmoutier in Vendée
- Mont Saint-Michel in Normandy
- Tombelaine in Normandy
- Grand Bé, Petit Bé and Fort National in Saint-Malo

==== Germany ====
- The Neuwerk in the Wadden Sea

==== Guernsey ====
- Lihou in Guernsey, one of the Channel Islands

==== Iceland ====
Grótta in Seltjarnarnes, the Capital Region

==== Ireland ====
- Coney Island near Rosses Point, County Sligo
- Omey Island in Connemara, County Galway
- Inishkeel, County Donegal

==== Italy ====
- Isola Grande, Sicily

==== Jersey ====
- Elizabeth Castle in Jersey, a castle off the south coast accessible on foot at low tide
- Saint Aubin's Fort
- La Corbière Lighthouse
- La Motte, Jersey, alias Green Island
- L'Avarison, which hosts Seymour Tower
- Archirondel Tower, now connected via permanent causeway
- Icho Tower
- Portelet Tower

==== Spain ====
- Cortegada Island in Pontevedra coast, Galicia.
- San Nikolas Island in Lekeitio, Bizkaia

==== United Kingdom ====
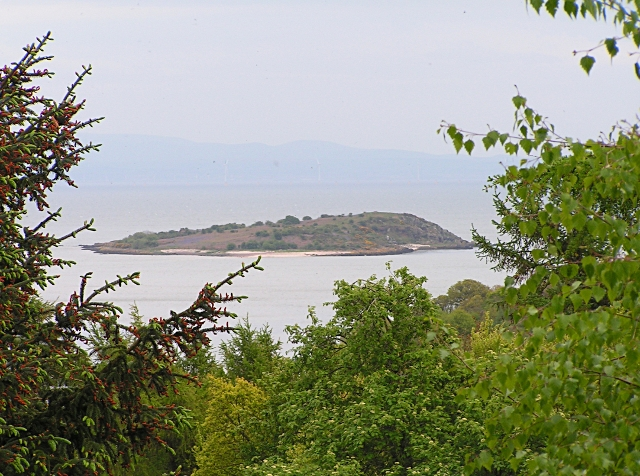
Rough Island opposite Rockcliffe, Dumfries & Galloway, Scotland

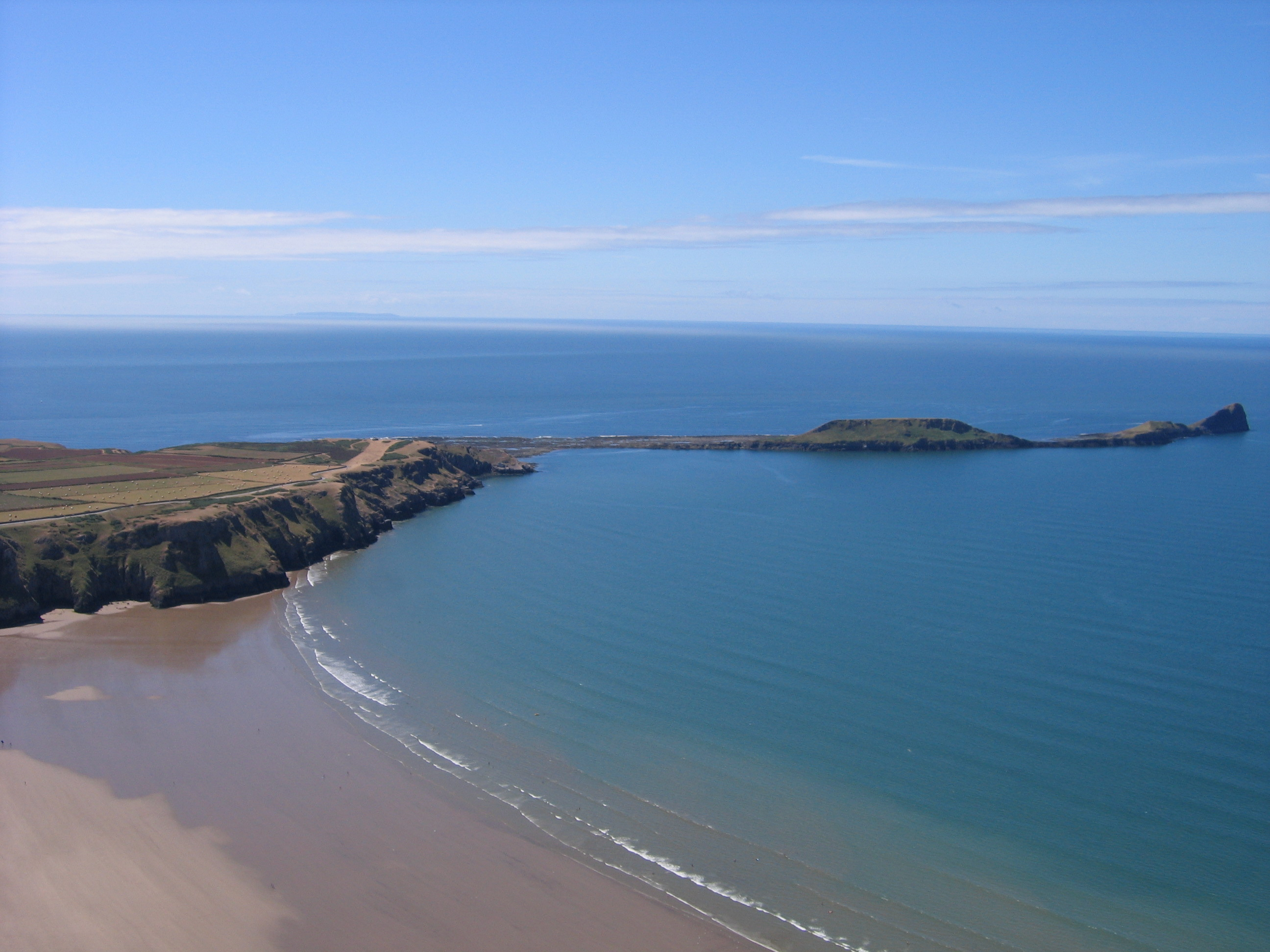
Worm's Head at the end of Gower, Wales

===== England =====
- Asparagus Island, Mount's Bay, Cornwall
- Burgh Island, Devon
- Burrow Island, Portsmouth Harbour
- Chapel Island, Cumbria
- Chiswick Eyot in the River Thames in London
- Dova Haw, one of the Islands of Furness, off the coast of Cumbria
- Gugh in the Isles of Scilly (joined to St Agnes at low tide)
- Headin Haw, one of the Islands of Furness, off the coast of Cumbria
- Hilbre Island, Middle Eye and Little Eye in the River Dee estuary, between North Wales and the English Wirral, but administratively in England.
- Horsey Island, Essex
- Lindisfarne, Northumberland, also known as Holy Island
- Marsden Rock, South Tyneside, Tyne and Wear
- Mersea Island, Essex (accessible to road traffic via the Strood)
- Northey Island, Essex
- Osea Island, Essex
- Piel Island, Cumbria
- Scolt Head Island, Norfolk
- Sheep Island, Cumbria (joined at low tide to Piel Island and to Walney Island)
- St Mary's Island, North Tyneside
- St Michael's Mount, Cornwall
- White Island, Isles of Scilly and St Martin's, Isles of Scilly

===== Northern Ireland =====
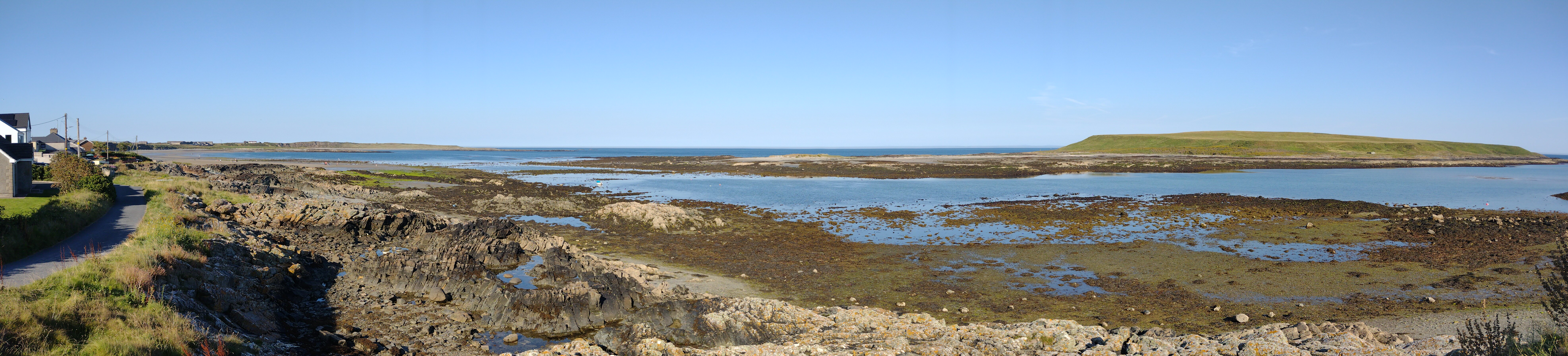
Gunns Island, connected to Ballyhornan Bay, Northern Ireland at low tide

- Nendrum Monastery on Mahee Island, Strangford Lough
- Guns Island, near Ballyhornan
- Isle of Muck, Portmuck
- Rough Island, near Comber, Strangford Lough

===== Scotland =====
- Baleshare in the Outer Hebrides, joined to North Uist
- Bernera Island, joined to Lismore
- Brough of Birsay in Orkney, joined to Orkney Mainland
- Castle Stalker on Loch Laich in Argyll
- Cramond Island in the Firth of Forth
- Island Davaar near Campbeltown, off the Kintyre peninsula
- Eilean Arnoil in the Outer Hebrides, joined to the Isle of Lewis
- Eilean Donan in the western Highlands of Scotland
- Eilean Fladday and Eilean Tigh off the Isle of Raasay
- Eilean Shona in Loch Moidart, Lochaber, Highland
- Eilean Tioram, in Loch Moidart
- Erraid off the Isle of Mull
- Hestan Island near Rough Island in Auchencairn Bay
- Islands of Fleet: Ardwall Isle and Barlocco Isle in Galloway
- Isle Ristol, the innermost of the Summer Isles
- Kili Holm in Orkney, joined to Egilsay
- Oronsay in the Inner Hebrides, joined to Colonsay
- Oronsay in Loch Bracadale, joined to Skye
- Orosay in the Outer Hebrides, joined to Barra
- Rough Island opposite Rockcliffe, Dumfries & Galloway
- Uyea, Northmavine, off the Northmavine peninsula, Shetland
- Vallay (Bhàlaigh), joined to North Uist in the Outer Hebrides

===== Wales =====
- Burry Holms off the Gower
- Cribinau off Anglesey
- Gateholm off the south west coast of Pembrokeshire
- Ynys Llanddwyn off Anglesey
- Mumbles Lighthouse located in Mumbles, near Swansea
- St Catherine's Island in Pembrokeshire
- Sully Island in the Vale of Glamorgan
- Worm's Head at the end of the Gower
- Ynys Cantwr off Ramsey Island, Pembrokeshire
- Ynys Feurig off Anglesey
- Ynys Gifftan in Gwynedd
- Ynys Gwelltog off Ramsey Island, Pembrokeshire
- Ynys Lochtyn on the coast of Cardigan Bay

43 (unbridged) tidal islands can be walked to from the UK mainland.

=== North America ===
==== Canada ====
- Bird Islet in Neck Point Park, Nanaimo, British Columbia
- Finisterre Island, off Bowen Island, British Columbia
- Francis Peninsula, off Sunshine Coast (British Columbia)
- Micou's Island in St. Margarets Bay, Nova Scotia
- Minister's Island, New Brunswick
- Ross Island and Cheney Island in Grand Manan, New Brunswick
- Wedge Island, Nova Scotia
- Whyte Islet in West Vancouver, British Columbia

==== United States ====
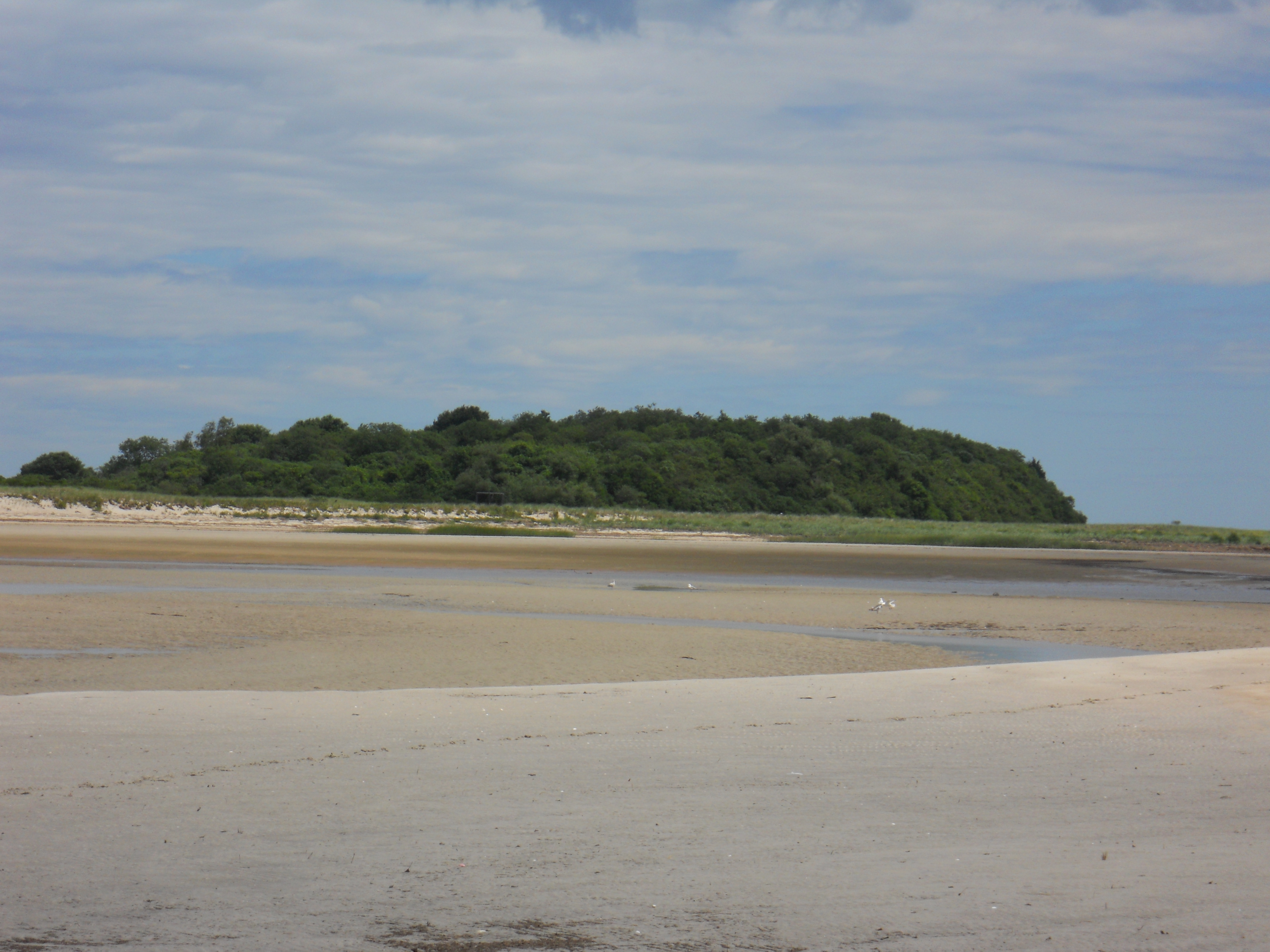
Bar Island in Maine, U.S.

- Bar Island in Maine
- Battery Point Light in California
- Bumpkin Island in Massachusetts
- Camano Island in Puget Sound of Washington state, since earth filled
- Charles Island, in Connecticut
- Douglas Island in Alaska
- High Island, New York
- Long Point Island, Harpswell, Maine
- Tskawahyah Island of Cape Alava, Washington

=== Oceania ===
==== Australia ====
- The Point Walter Sandbar in Perth, Western Australia has slowly formed into a tidal island and is only connected to the mainland in extreme low tides.
- Penguin Island (Western Australia) in the Shoalwater Islands Marine Park
- Former tidal island Bennelong Island in Sydney, Australia was developed into Bennelong Point and is now the location of the Sydney Opera House.

==== New Zealand ====
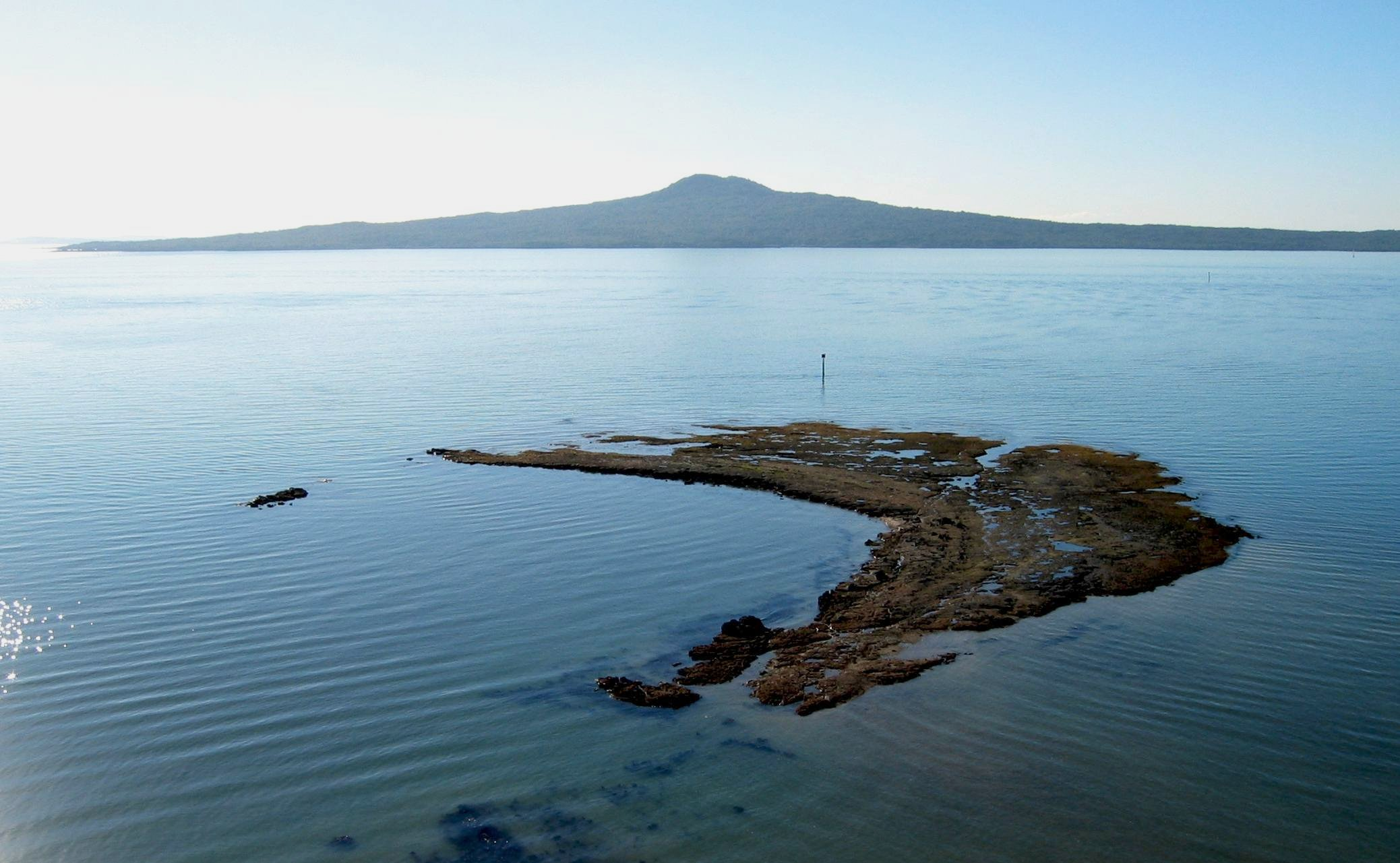
Rangitoto Island forms a backdrop to a wave-cut platform off Achilles Point, Auckland, New Zealand.

- Kōpuahingahinga Island, Pararekau Island and Te Toka-Tapu-a-Kupe / Ninepin Rock in Manukau Harbour
- Matakana Island in Tauranga Harbour
- Moturoa / Rabbit Island, Bells Island, and Bests Island in Tasman Bay
- The Okatakata Islands in Rangaunu Harbour
- Opahekeheke Island in the Kaipara Harbour
- Puddingstone Island in the Otago Harbour
- Taieri Island / Moturata in Otago
- Taitomo Island on the west coast of the Auckland Region
- The Hauraki Gulf islands of Motutapu Island and Rangitoto Island are connected at low tide

== See also ==
- Islet – Very small island
- Peninsula – Land feature
- Presque-isle – Peninsula with narrow connection to mainland
- Tied island – Island that is connected to land only by a tombolo
- Tombolo – Deposition landform in which an island is connected to the mainland by a sandy isthmus
- Vanishing island – Island submersed at high tide
