= Roa Island =

Island near Barrow-in-Furness, England

- Location in Morecambe Bay Location in the former Barrow-in-Furness Borough Location within Cumbria
- Unitary authority: Westmorland and Furness
- Ceremonial county: Cumbria
- Region: North West
- Country: England
- Sovereign state: United Kingdom
- Postcode district: LA13
- Dialling code: 01229
- Police: Cumbria
- Fire: Cumbria
- Ambulance: North West
- UK Parliament: Barrow and Furness

Roa Island lies just over half a mile (1 km) south of the village of Rampside at the southernmost point of the Furness Peninsula in Cumbria, formerly in the county of Lancashire north of the sands. It is located at 54°5′N 3°10′W (OS grid ref. SD 233650). It is one of the Islands of Furness in northern England. It has an area of about three hectares.

Roa Island is within the unitary authority of Westmorland and Furness. The island's population stands at around 100, making it the 15th most populated island in England.

== History ==
Until 1847 Roa Island was a true island, being accessible only by boat, or on foot across the sands at low tide. John Abel Smith, a London banker, bought Roa in 1840. He built a causeway to the mainland, completed in 1846, and an 810-foot (247 m) deep-water pier known as Piel Pier from where steamers sailed to Fleetwood. The pier connected with the Furness Railway line to Kirkby via Furness Abbey, making use of the causeway. Initially the line was open for goods traffic only, but on 24 August 1846 a passenger service was inaugurated.

Over the years there was much disagreement between Smith and the Furness Railway. At one point the railway company set up its own steamer service to Piel Pier, but following a dispute with Smith, diverted the sailings to nearby Barrow. Eventually Smith was able to obtain an injunction for its return to the pier. In due course, however, Smith and the Furness Railway settled their differences and in 1852 the railway agreed to buy the lease for the entire Roa Island estate. Before the deal could be completed a freak storm caused extensive damage to the pier. This allowed the railway to buy all the rights and the property for only £15,000. Piel Pier was demolished in 1891 following changes to the course of Piel Channel which resulted in silting up of the area around the end of the pier. The railway continued in use until July 1936.

Today there is little obvious trace of it, though many of the stones that form the sides of the causeway are actually square stone sleepers from the railway. A road linking Roa Island to Rampside has now taken the place of the railway tracks along the causeway.

== Modern-day Roa Island ==
Roa Island has a population of about one hundred. Despite its moderate area it boasts a yacht club, a former hotel (the Roa Island Hotel built in 1849 and originally called the Pier Hotel), and a cafe, within which enquiries can be made about the ferry to Piel Island. Overlooking the sea with a south-facing aspect is Villa Marina. This house was built for the Furness industrialist H.W. Schneider as a holiday residence. Over the years it has served as a fisheries investigation laboratory and as army premises during World War II. It is now a hotel. On the lawn are seven cannon pointing out to sea. Other interesting buildings include Trinity Terrace, a row of terraced houses built to provide accommodation for the ten Trinity House pilots; and The Watch Tower, a former Customs and Excise House built in 1847.

Roa Island is home to a lifeboat station of the RNLI, serving Morecambe Bay and the Irish Sea. The station was established in 1864 and was known at the time as Piel (Barrow). In recent years it has been completely rebuilt and enlarged.

Local people have been critical that the tourism potential of Roa Island has been little publicised, whilst other more negative aspects of the local area have been more widely documented, for example in Channel Four's The Secret Millionaire.

== Photographs ==
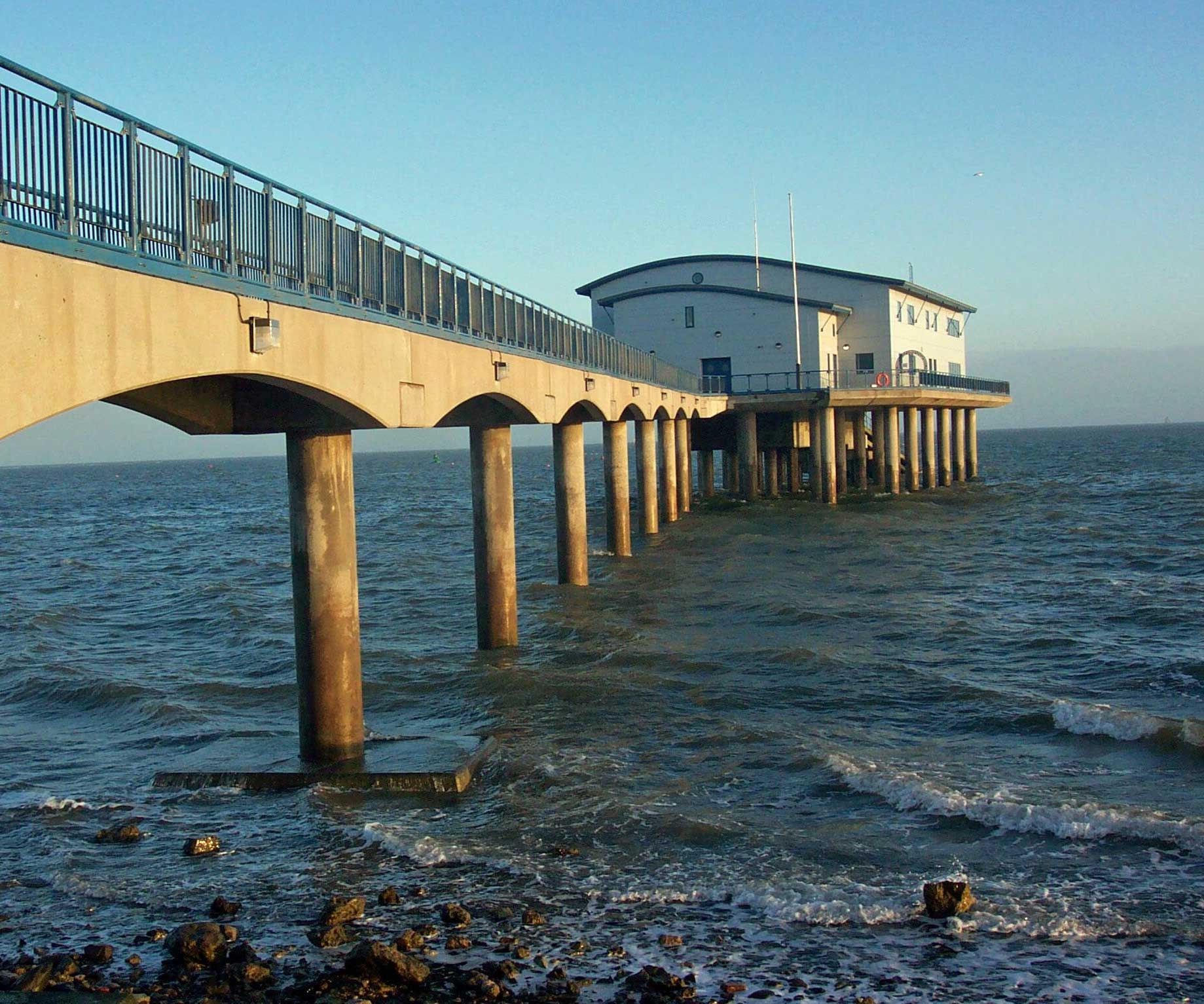
Roa Island lifeboat station

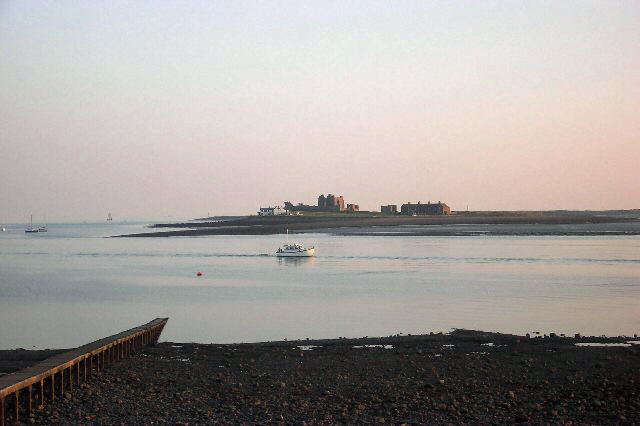
View from Roa Island to Piel Island

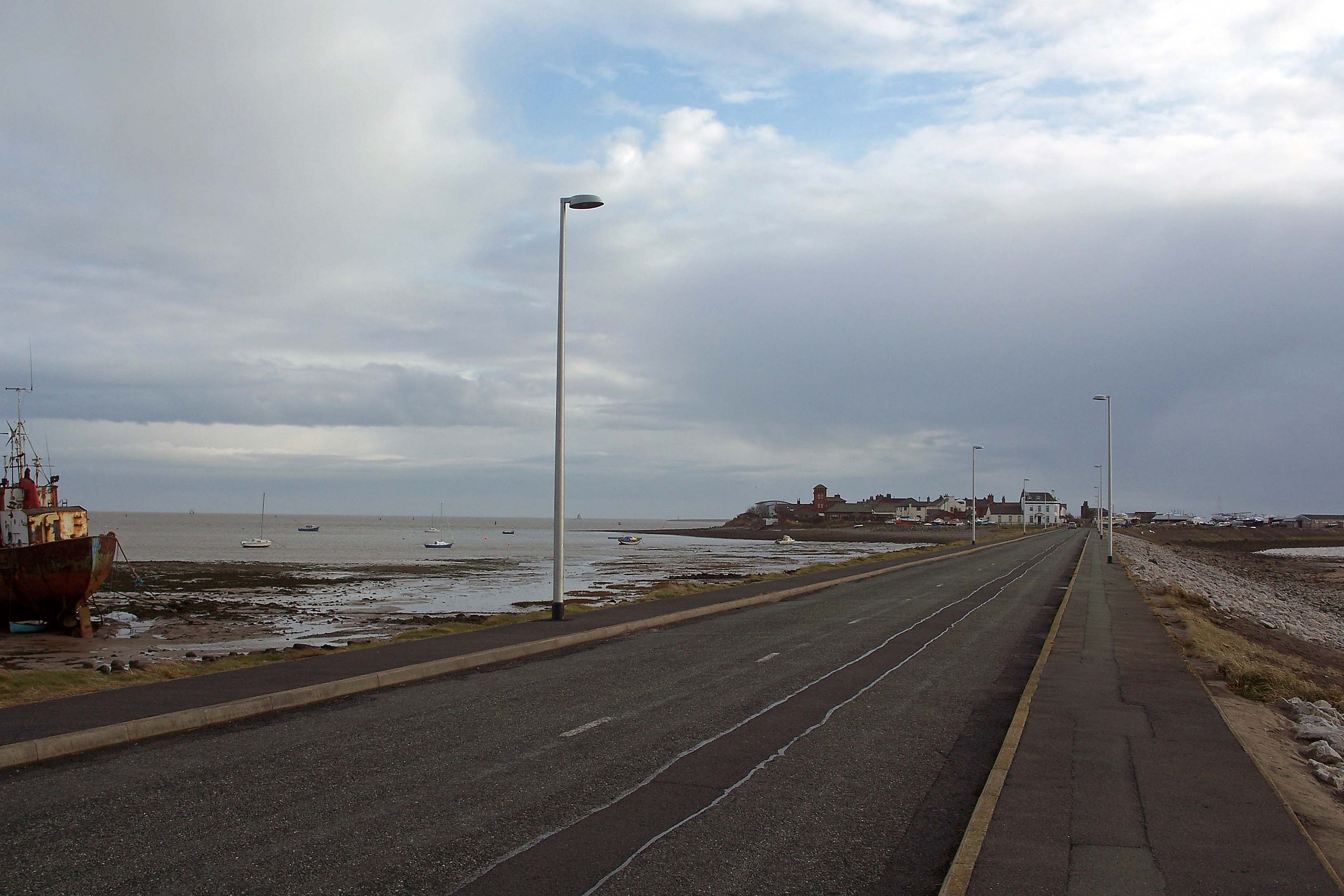
Causeway to Roa Island

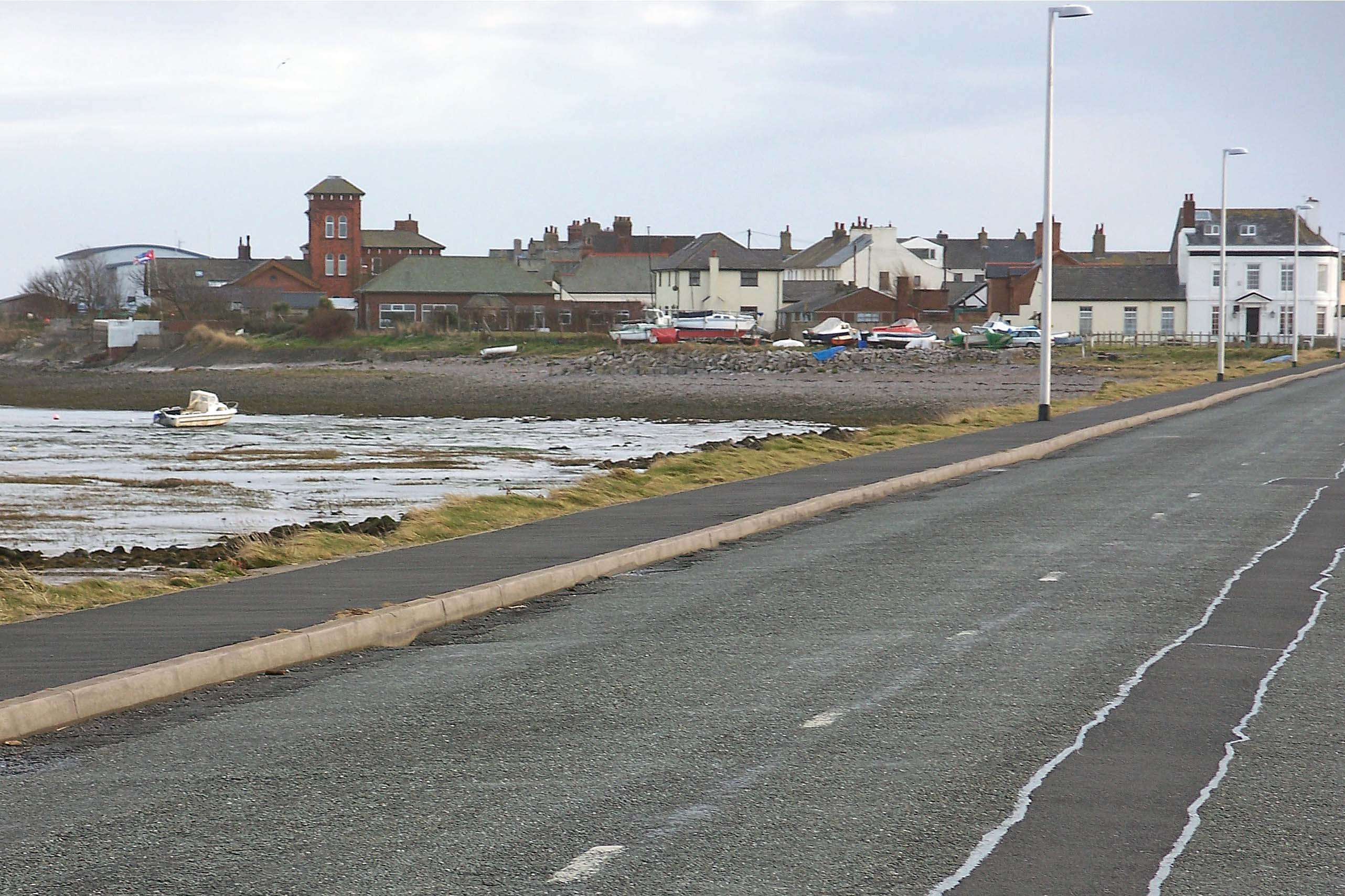
Roa Island village

== See also ==
- Piel Island
- Foulney Island
