= Taitomo Island =

Island in New Zealand

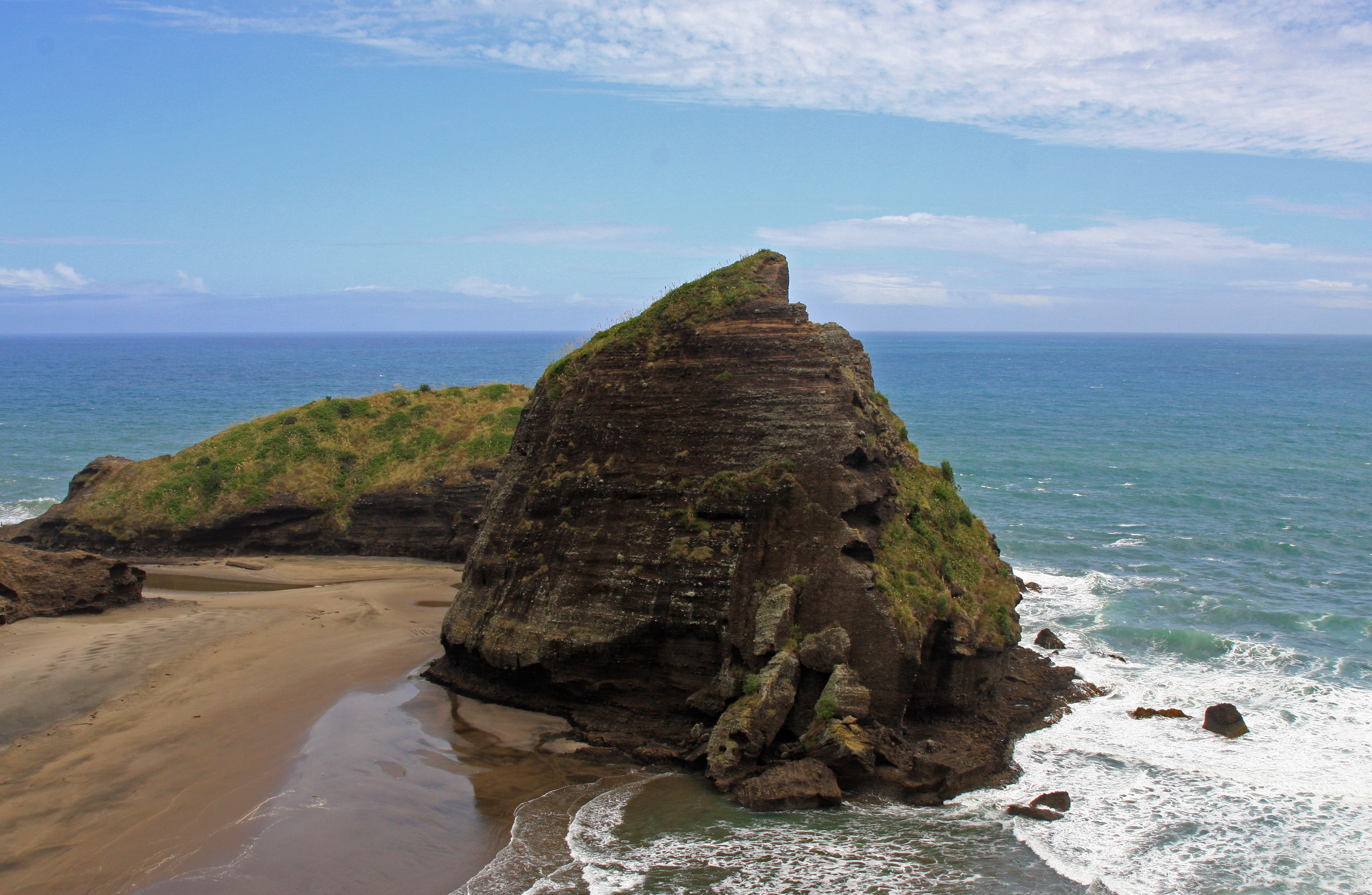
- Taitomo Island in 2009
- Interactive map of Taitomo Island

Geography
- Location: Auckland
- Coordinates: 36.959444°S 174.462601°E
- Adjacent to: Tasman Sea
- Area: 31,000 m^{2} (330,000 sq ft)
- Length: 340 m (1120 ft)
- Width: 120 m (390 ft)
- Highest elevation: 60 m (200 ft)

Administration
- New Zealand

Taitomo Island is a tidal island on the west coast of the Auckland Region, New Zealand, near Piha.

== Geography ==
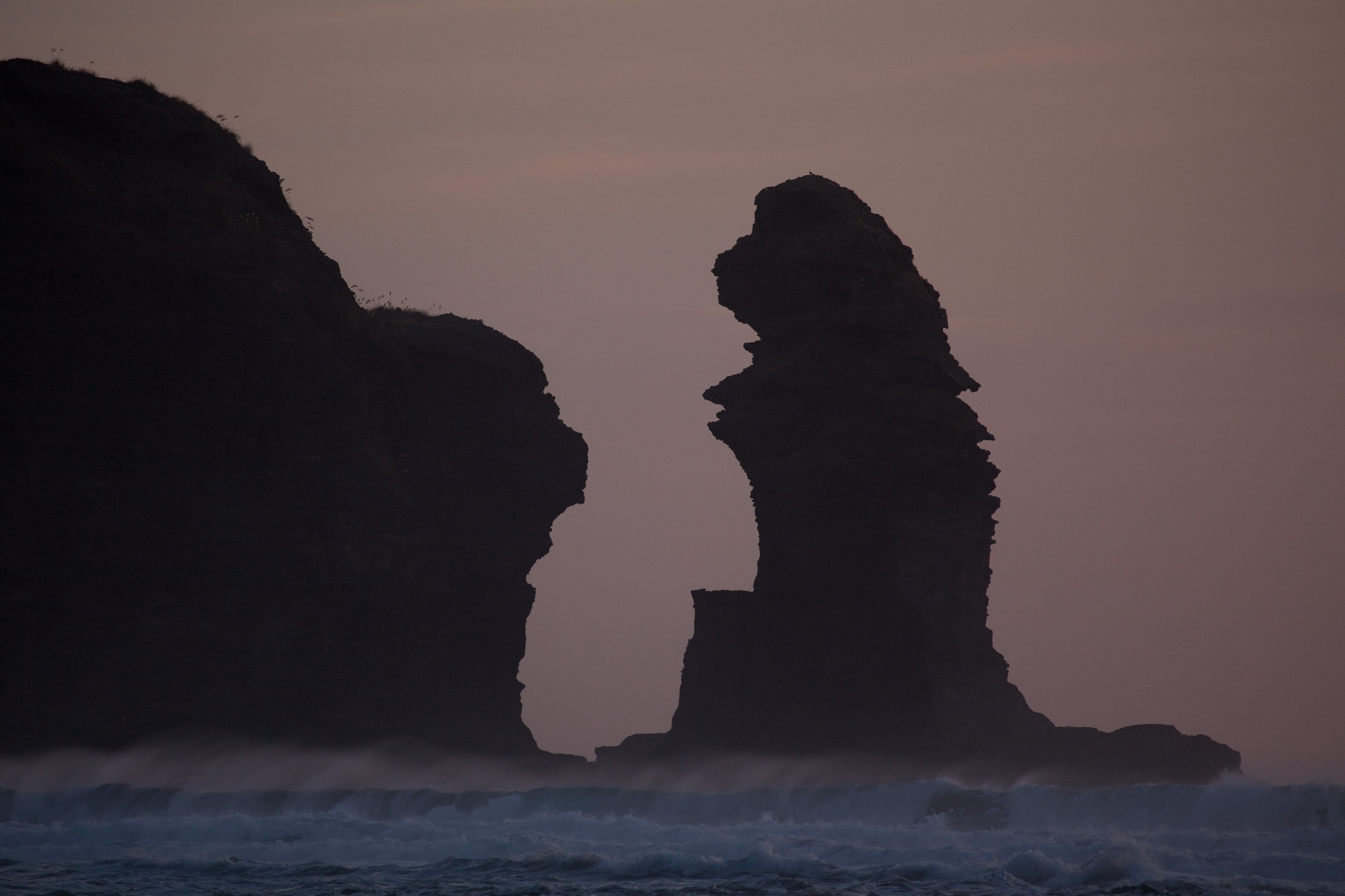
A narrow gap exists between Taitomo Island and Nun Rock

Taitomo Island is located at the southern end of Piha beach. The island is approximately 60 m (200 ft) above sealevel, and has an area of approximately 3.1 ha (7.7 acres). Nun Rock is located on the west side of Taimoto Island, separated by a 10 m (33 ft) gap.

== Geology ==
Taitomo Island and Nun Rock consist of a volcanic conglomerate of rocks of volcanic origin from the Miocene era. A strip of andesite rock is found in the middle of the island, which over time has partially dissolved, creating a feature known as the Key Hole.

== History ==
Archaeological evidence shows that Taitomo Island was the location of at least three fortified pā.

Early European settlers used various names for the island, including Rabbit Island and Camel Rock. The island is owned by local iwi Te Kawerau ā Maki.
