= Wedge Island (Nova Scotia) =

Tidal island near Liscomb, Nova Scotia, Canada

Coordinates: 45°00′N 61°52′W

Wedge Island is a tidal island near Liscomb, Nova Scotia. Geologically, it is a drowned coast. Once the home to a lighthouse and light keepers home, throughout the years with advancements the light keeper was replaced with an all-electric light which was removed some time in the 1970s or 1980s.
