= Fowley Island =

Island in Hampshire, England

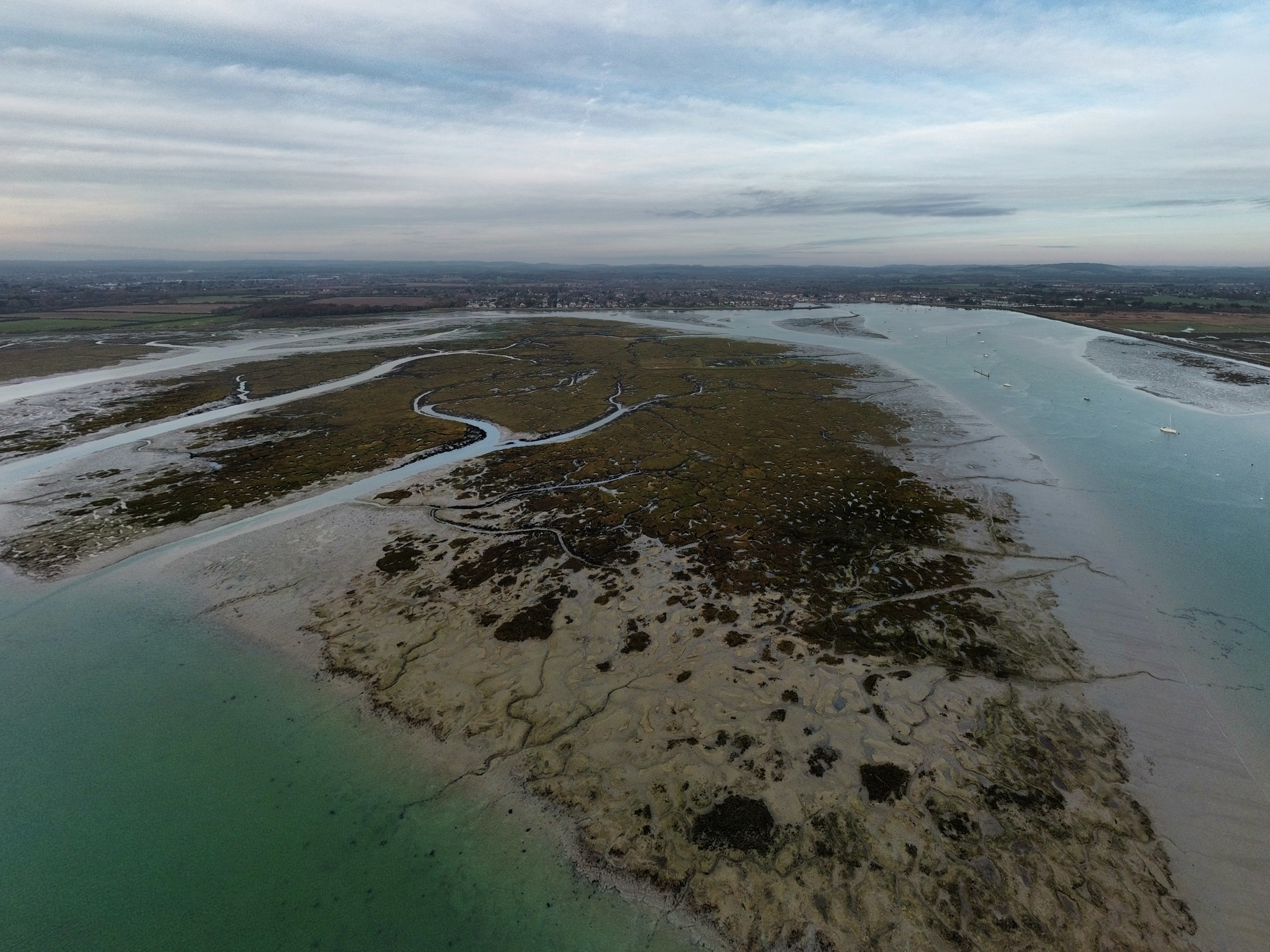

- Location within Hampshire

Geography
- Location: Chichester Harbour
- Coordinates: 50.8349°N 0.9455°W
- Total islands: 1
- Length: 0.18 km (0.112 mi)
- Width: 0.08 km (0.05 mi)

Administration
- England
- County: Hampshire
- Borough: Havant

Demographics
- Population: 0

Fowley Island is a small uninhabited island in Chichester Harbour, around 900 metres south of the coast at Emsworth between Hayling Island and Thorney Island. The island is an area of raised ground approximately 180 metres by 80 metres amid the tidal sands between the channels of Sweare Deep and Emsworth Channel. The island has appeared on maps since at least 1791 when it featured on Milne's map of the area.

== Fisherman's Walk ==
Fisherman's Walk is a causeway that runs along the sands from the coast at Emsworth around 340 metres to Fowley Rithe, a narrow channel that runs 200 metres to the north east of Fowley Island. The causeway was depicted on a chart of 1848 but was absent in an earlier 1826 map, suggesting that it was constructed between those dates. In the Ordnance Survey map of 1866 it is labelled 'Westwood's Road'.

The causeway is believed to have been created to support oyster farming, though the first historical record of this dates from only 1885 when the Fowley Island Oyster Company began. Although the causeway does not reach Fowley Island, and no historical maps show it doing so, it may still have been possible to walk from the causeway to the island on the eel grass that once filled the water bed. The reduction in eel grass over the last century means that such a crossing is no longer possible. Fishermen would have taken a horse and cart across the causeway to Fowley Island and stored oysters in large ponds that they had dug there before taking them back for sale. The Ordnance Survey map of 1898 shows two such oyster beds on Fowley Island, activity which has resulted in the island's distinctive present shape.

The effort required to create a causeway of this size shows the commercial importance of the oyster industry to Emsworth. The industry took a serious hit in 1902 after William Stephens, the Dean of Winchester, and several other diners died from typhoid after a dinner at which Emsworth oysters were served. An investigation blamed sewage contamination of the oyster beds and Emsworth oyster sales were banned until 1914. The industry restarted after the First World War but never recovered its former success.

Other uses for the causeway have included salterns (evaporation pools used for harvesting salt) along its western side, as shown on the Ordnance Survey map of 1952, and the eastern side formerly supported poles probably for securing boats.
