= Islands of Furness =

Islands off the coast of northwest England

Coordinates: 54.1039°N 3.25°W

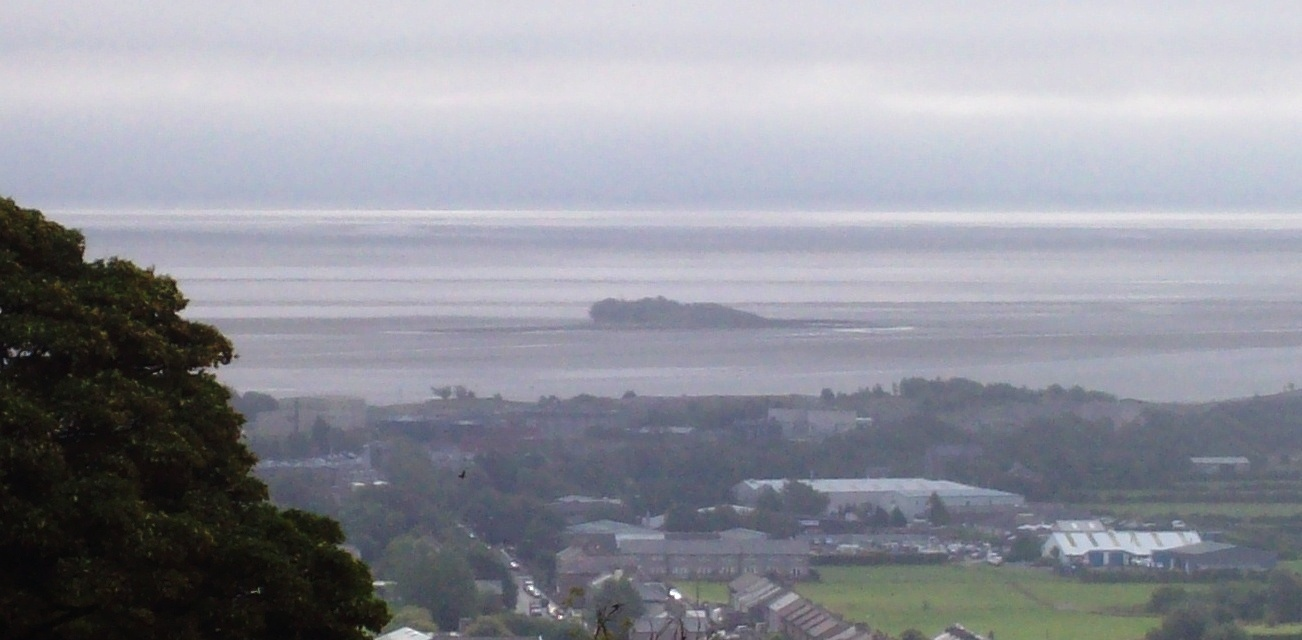
Chapel Island

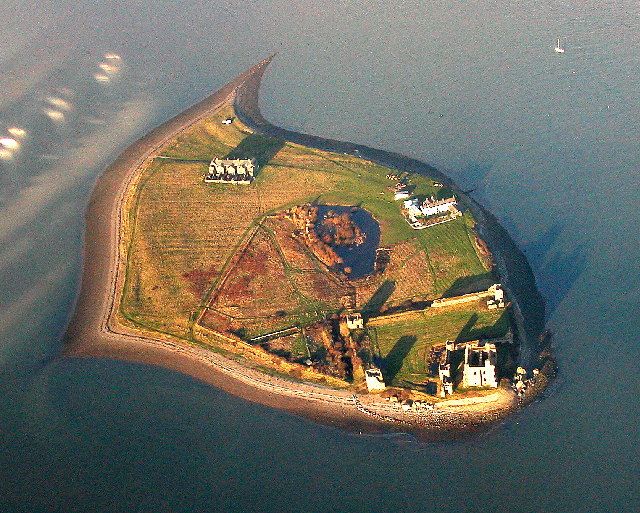
Piel Island

The islands (except Chapel) in the former Borough of Barrow-in-Furness district
The larger islands on a map of Morecambe Bay

The Islands of Furness are situated to the south-west and east of the Furness Peninsula. Within England, they are the third biggest collection of islands. They are generally quite small, though at 12.99 km^{2} Walney Island is the eighth biggest in England. Of these, only Walney Island, Barrow Island, Roa Island and Piel Island are inhabited. The majority of the islands lay within the boundary of the former Borough of Barrow-in-Furness, with some 15,000 residents constituting 20% of the district's population. They are the largest group of islands between Anglesey in Wales and the Firth of Clyde in Scotland.

The main islands are:

- Walney Island - Population 10,651 (Settlements include Biggar, North Scale, North Walney and Vickerstown)
- Barrow Island - Population 2,616
- Sheep Island - Population 0
- Roa Island - Population ~100
- Piel Island - Population ~10
- Foulney Island - Population 0
- Chapel Island - Population 0

As well as these, the small islets of Dova Haw, also known as Crab Island and Headin Haw sit in Walney Channel, whilst the old Ramsey Island is now, like Barrow Island, part of the docks system.

Chapel, Piel, Foulney and Sheep Islands are tidal and can be walked to at low tide, with appropriate care. Anyone wishing to walk to Piel and Chapel Islands should seek local advice as fast tides and quicksands can be extremely dangerous.

== See also ==
- List of the British Isles
- List of islands of England
