= Headin Haw =

Small tidal island off the coast of Cumbria, England

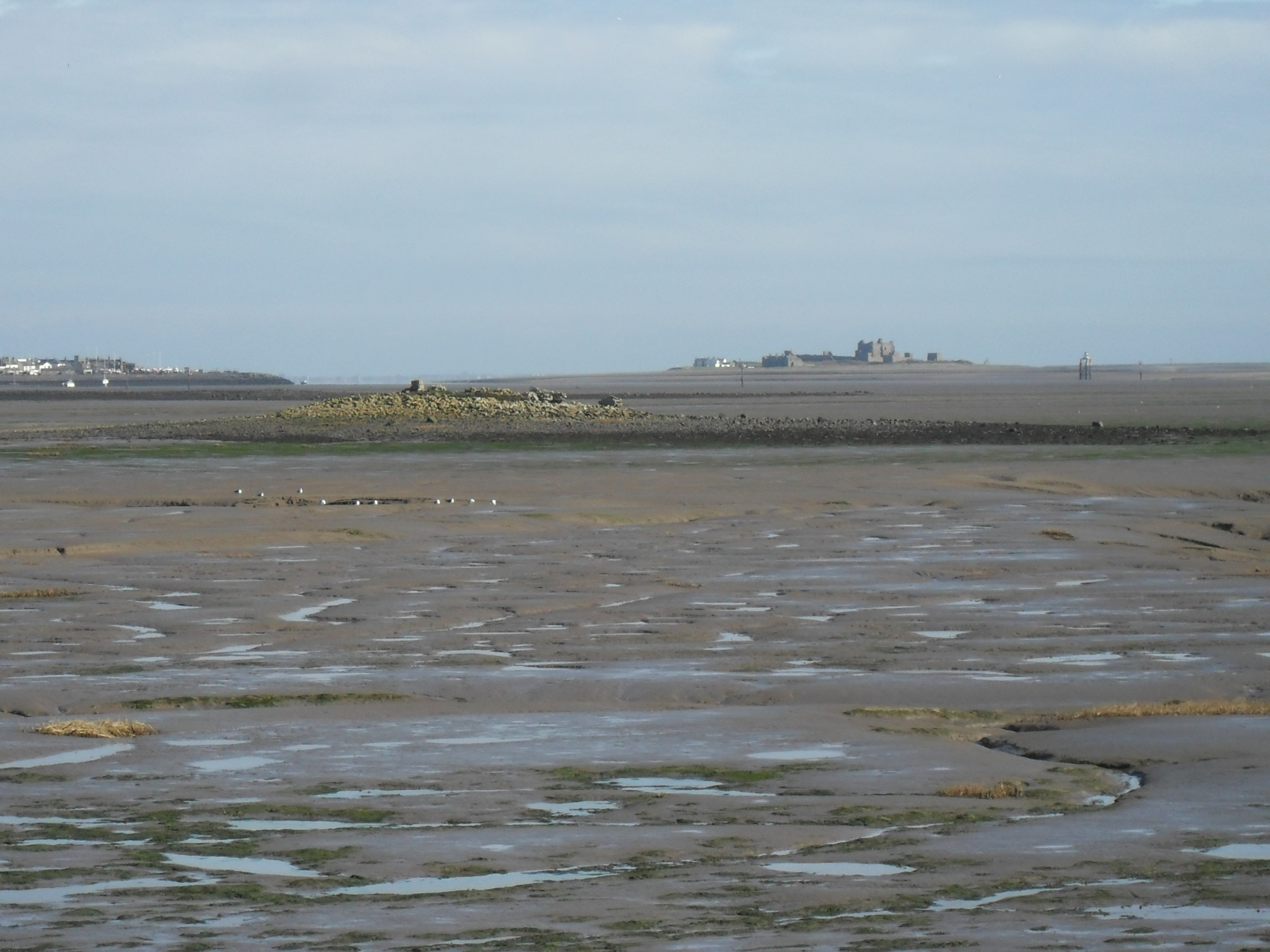
- Headin Haw in foreground, with Roa Island (left) and Piel Island in background

- Location in Barrow-in-Furness Borough Location in Morecambe Bay

Geography
- Location: Morecambe Bay
- Coordinates: 54°05′51″N 3°12′09″W
- Archipelago: British Isles

Administration
- United Kingdom
- County: Cumbria

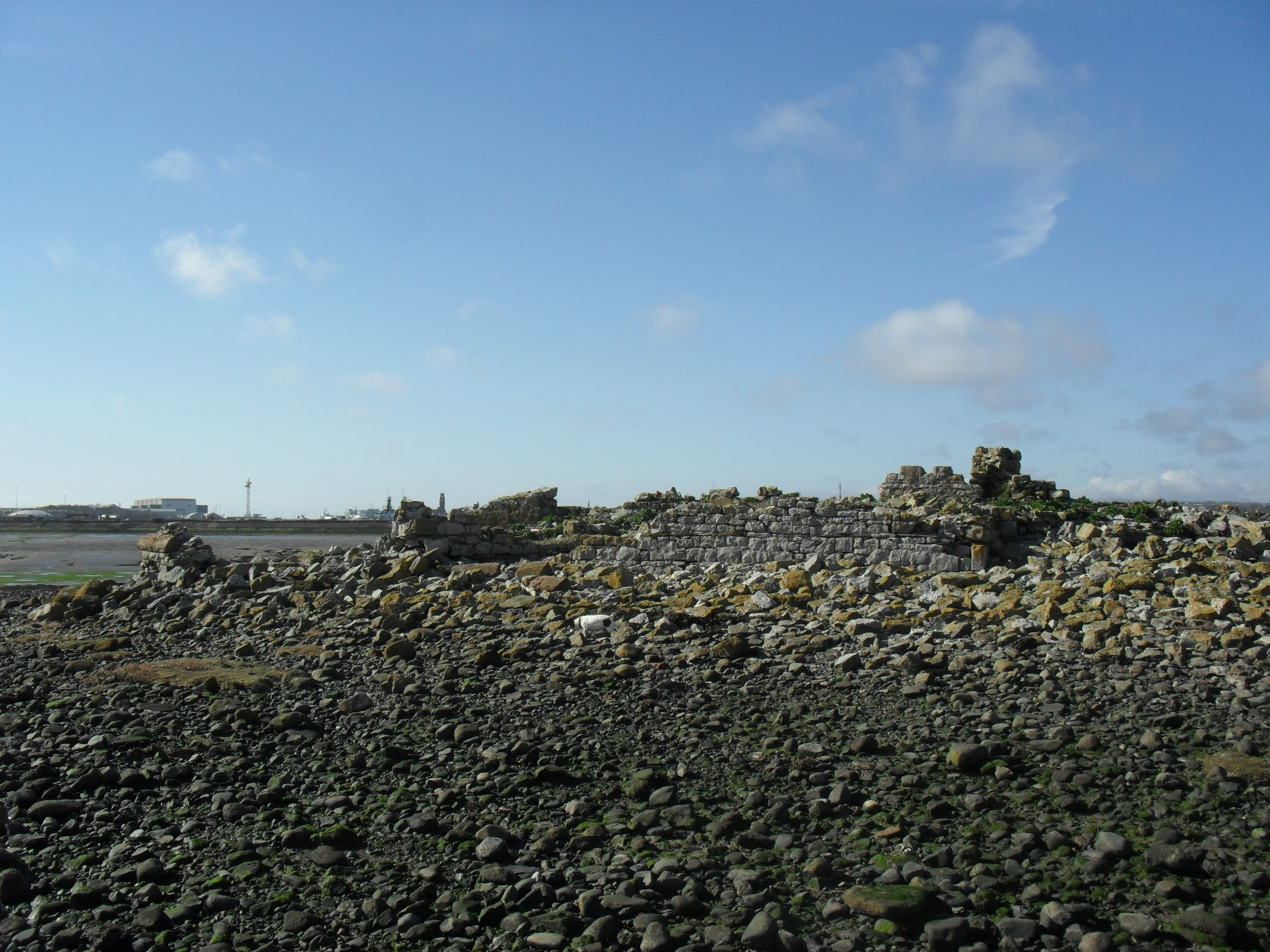
Remains of magazine at Headin Haw

Headin Haw, also spelled Headen Haw, is part of the Islands of Furness. It is a small tidal island approximately 200 metres (220 yards) off the coast of Cumbria, England (historically Lancashire), adjacent to the town of Barrow-in-Furness. The Melfort Gunpowder Company built a powder magazine here in 1853. From here powder was delivered to the company magazine at Powka near Lindal Moor and also to Hodbarrow, Whitehaven and further afield in the Company's ships. The magazine was last used in April 1876.
