= Dova Haw =

Small tidal island off the coast of Cumbria, England

- Location in Barrow-in-Furness Borough Location in Morecambe Bay

Geography
- Location: Morecambe Bay
- Coordinates: 54°05′46″N 3°14′08″W
- Archipelago: British Isles

Administration
- United Kingdom
- County: Cumbria

Dova Haw, also known as Crab Island, is a small islet that is one of the Islands of Furness. It is a small tidal island off the coast of Cumbria, England, 0.3 miles (0.48 km) from Barrow Island and 0.6 miles (0.97 km) from Walney Island, adjacent to the town of Barrow-in-Furness. Previously, Dova Haw was the site of an oil lamp lighthouse built from stone, whose foundations are still visible. It is also known as Crab Island because people back in the late 1800s to mid 1900s went crab fishing here.
