= Foulney Island =

Island in Cumbria, England

Coordinates: 54.066689°N 3.151488°W

- Location in Barrow-in-Furness Borough Location in Morecambe Bay Location within Cumbria
- Population: 0
- OS grid reference: SD246640
- Unitary authority: Westmorland and Furness
- Ceremonial county: Cumbria
- Region: North West
- Country: England
- Sovereign state: United Kingdom
- Police: Cumbria
- Fire: Cumbria
- Ambulance: North West

Foulney Island is a low-lying grass and shingle area 1 mile (1.6 km) to the south-east of Roa Island, off the southern tip of the Furness Peninsula in Cumbria, England. Foulney Island is one of the Islands of Furness in Morecambe Bay, northern England. For local government purposes the island is in the borough of Westmorland and Furness. It has an area of about 40 acres (16 ha). In earlier times it was known as Fowle Island.

The island is connected to the mainland via a shingle and rock causeway which was built in Victorian times as a tidal protection measure. The Foulney causeway leaves the Roa Island causeway halfway along its length on the eastern side. The maximum elevation on the island is no more than 10 feet (3 metres) above the high tide level. At the time of highest tides much of the island can be inundated. There are no permanent inhabitants on the island.

== Bird sanctuary ==
Foulney is a bird sanctuary and is included in the South Walney & Piel Channel Flats Site of Special Scientific Interest (SSSI).

Since 1974 the island has been managed by the Cumbria Wildlife Trust. During the summer months the island is wardened and visitors are discouraged from walking in the nesting areas. Bird species observed at Foulney include:

- Sandwich tern; occasional.
- Little tern
- Arctic tern; Foulney is the only breeding location in north-west England.
- Common tern
- Roseate tern; rare.
- Eurasian oystercatcher
- Ringed plover
- Golden plover
- Grey plover
- Brent goose
- Red-breasted merganser
- Great crested grebe
- Common scoter
- Redshank
- Meadow pipit
- Common eider
- Dunlin
- Knot
- Sanderling
- Eurasian curlew
- Eurasian whimbrel
- Black-tailed godwit

== Getting to Foulney ==
Access to Foulney Island involves a walk of about a mile along the causeway. Visitors should not take dogs and should avoid the nesting grounds during the breeding season. In recent times (2004/2005) the area has become popular with cockle and mussel pickers. There is some concern locally that damage might be done to the nesting sites if these activities continue to expand. Also, worry for the safety of the cocklers has increased since the 2004 Morecambe Bay cockling disaster, in which 21 Chinese cocklers drowned. Foulney and its immediate surrounds are popular with fishermen and windsurfers.
