= Sheep Island (England) =

Island in Furness, Cumbria, England

- Location in Barrow-in-Furness Borough Location in Morecambe Bay Location in Cumbria

Geography
- Location: Morecambe Bay
- Coordinates: 54.065°N 3.201°W
- Archipelago: British Isles

Administration
- United Kingdom
- County: Cumbria

Sheep Island is an uninhabited grassy island of around 15 acres (6 ha), located just over 1/4 mile (400 m) from the shore of Walney Island, opposite Snab Point. It is one of the Islands of Furness and is in Westmorland and Furness in Cumbria in northwest England. The island's geographic location is, using the British national grid reference system, SD215639.

Sheep Island is accessible on foot at low tide from either Walney, or from Piel Island - a distance of about a mile (approx. 1.5 km). The island is uninhabited and there is no shelter. Between 1892 and 1922, it included a small isolation hospital located within a wooden building, which was constructed by Barrow Borough Council at a cost of £257, but rarely used.
