= Great Cob Island =

Island in Essex, England

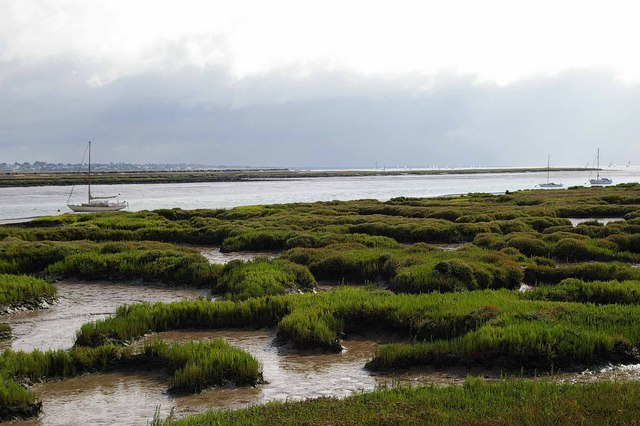
- View across Tollesbury marshes to Great Cob Island with West Mersea in the distance.

- Location within Essex

Geography
- Location: Blackwater Estuary
- Coordinates: 51.762°N 0.878°E
- Length: 0.9 km (0.56 mi)
- Width: 0.1 km (0.06 mi)

Administration
- England
- County: Essex
- Borough: Maldon

Demographics
- Population: 0

Great Cob island is a small island in the estuary of the River Blackwater in Essex, England, the United Kingdom. The island is an area of low-lying salt marsh in the tidal channel known as Virley Channel that runs to the east of the village of Tollesbury. Long and narrow in shape, it is around 900 metres (3,000 ft) in length and around 100 metres (330 ft) at its widest. It lies just to the south of the RSPB nature reserve of Old Hall Marshes.

== See also ==
- Cobmarsh Island
- Northey Island
- Osea Island
- Sunken Island
