= Morecambe Bay =

Estuary in northwest England

Designations

Ramsar Wetland
- Official name: Morecambe Bay
- Designated: 4 October 1996
- Reference no.: 863

Map of Morecambe Bay

Location in England

Location relative to Lancashire

Location relative to Cumbria

Morecambe Bay forms part of the Irish Sea, bordered by the English counties of Cumbria to the north and Lancashire to the east and south. It is the largest expanse of intertidal mudflats and sand in the United Kingdom, covering a total area of 120 sq mi (310 km^{2}). In 1974, the second largest gas field in the UK was discovered 25 mi (40 km) west of Blackpool, with original reserves of over 7 trillion cubic feet (tcf) (200 billion cubic metres). At its peak, 15% of Britain's natural gas supply came from the bay but production is now in decline. Morecambe Bay is also an important wildlife site, with abundant birdlife and varied marine habitats.

== Natural features ==
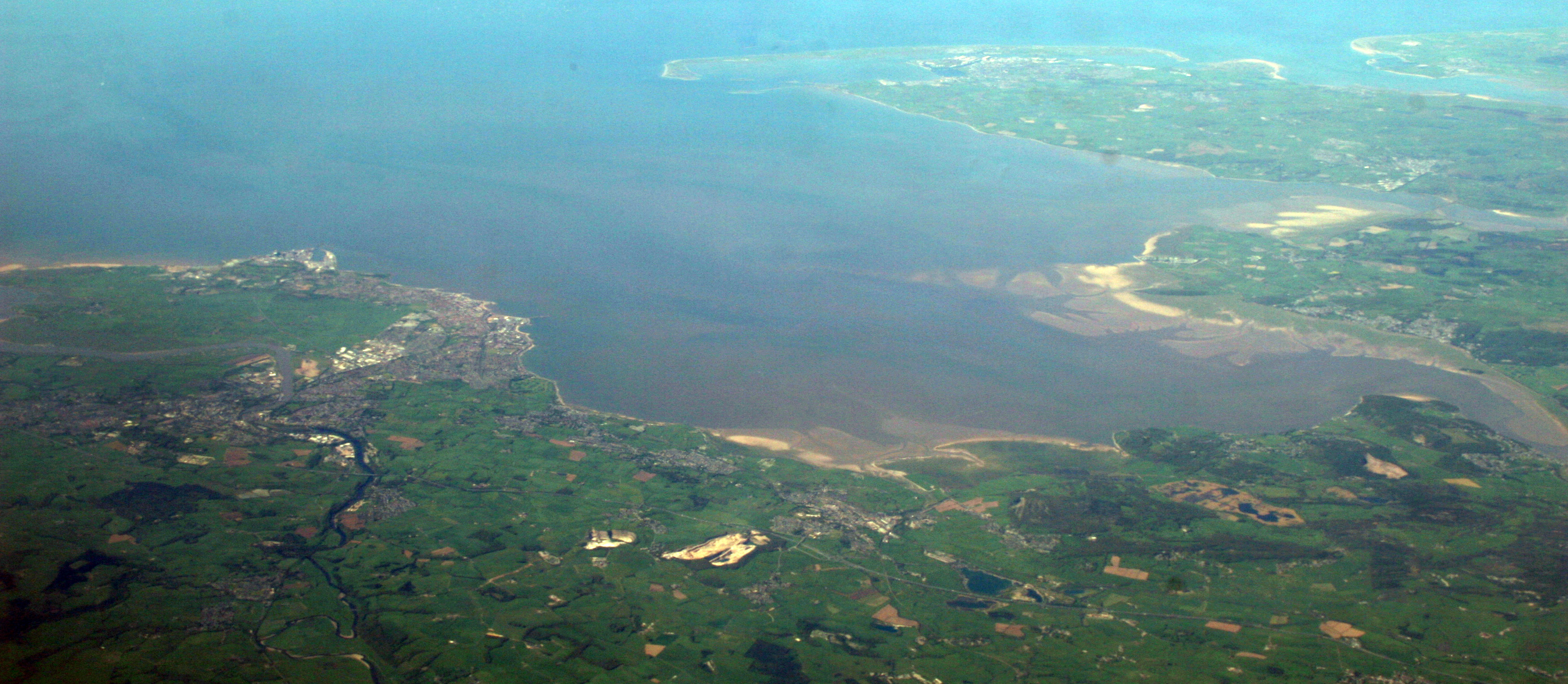
A panorama of most of Morecambe Bay looking from east (bottom of photo) to west (top of photo). Barrow-in-Furness and Walney Island can be seen in the upper part of the photo and Lancaster and Morecambe are visible in the lower left-hand corner of the photo.

The rivers Leven, Kent, Keer, Lune and Wyre drain into the Bay, with their various estuaries making a number of peninsulas within the bay. Much of the land around the bay is reclaimed, forming salt marshes used in agriculture. The bay is known for its wildlife populations, being a Special Area of Conservation, Special Protection Area and a Site of Special Scientific Interest, and there is a bird observatory at Walney Island. Some of the surrounding land is also a protected area, forming the Morecambe Bay Pavements, home to rare butterflies such as the high brown fritillary. The bay has rich cockle beds, which have been fished by locals for generations.

There are seven main islands in the bay, all to the west; Walney, Barrow, Sheep, Piel, Chapel, Foulney and Roa. Walney is substantially larger than the others, with its southern tip marking the north-western corner of the Bay. Sheep, Piel, Chapel and Foulney Islands are tidal and can be walked to at low tide with appropriate care. Local guidance should be sought if walking to Chapel or Piel islands as fast tides and quicksand can be extremely dangerous. Roa Island is linked to the mainland by a causeway, while Barrow Island has been connected to the mainland as part of the docks system at Barrow-in-Furness.

== History ==
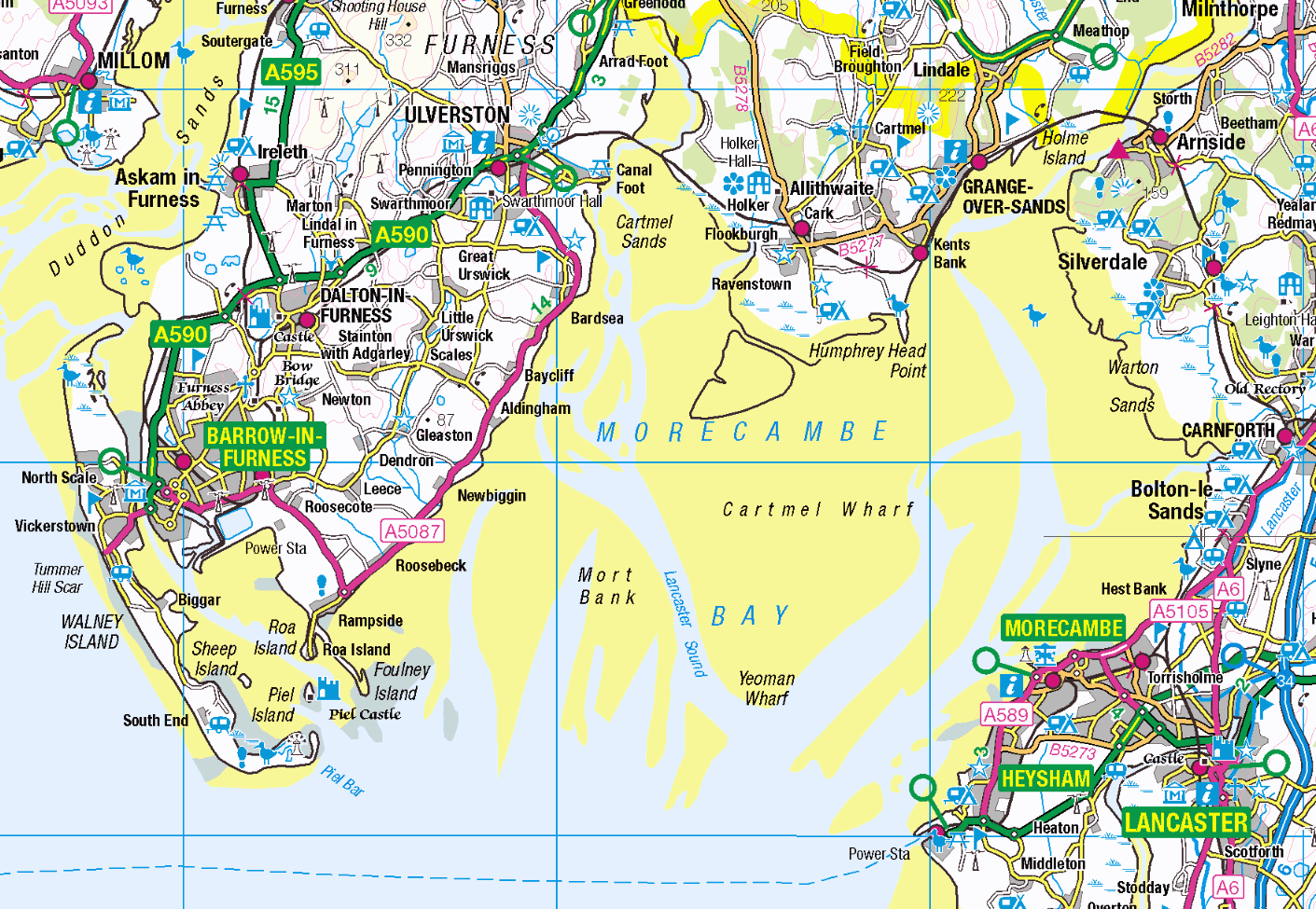
Map of the northern part of Morecambe Bay

The extensive sandflats are the remains of a vast sandur or outwash plain established by meltwaters as the last ice age waned. Sea-level was still some 3m below present day levels at the start of the Holocene some 11,000 years ago.

The Greek geographer and astronomer Claudius Ptolemy (died c170 AD) referred in his writings to Morikambe eischusis as a location on Britain's west coast, lying between the Ribble and the Solway. The sixteenth-century scholar William Camden identified the locality as being near Silloth, hence the similar name of that bay but the eighteenth century antiquarian John Horsley who translated Ptolemy into English in 1732 favoured it being the bay on the then Lancashire—Cumberland border. In 1771 historian John Whitaker took up this latter suggestion and the name appeared on maps subsequently. The first recorded to do so being one associated with Father Thomas West's Antiquities of Furness of 1774. Camden believed the name originated with two words meaning crooked sea whilst West offered up white/beautiful haven though current thought is that it refers to a curve of the sea.

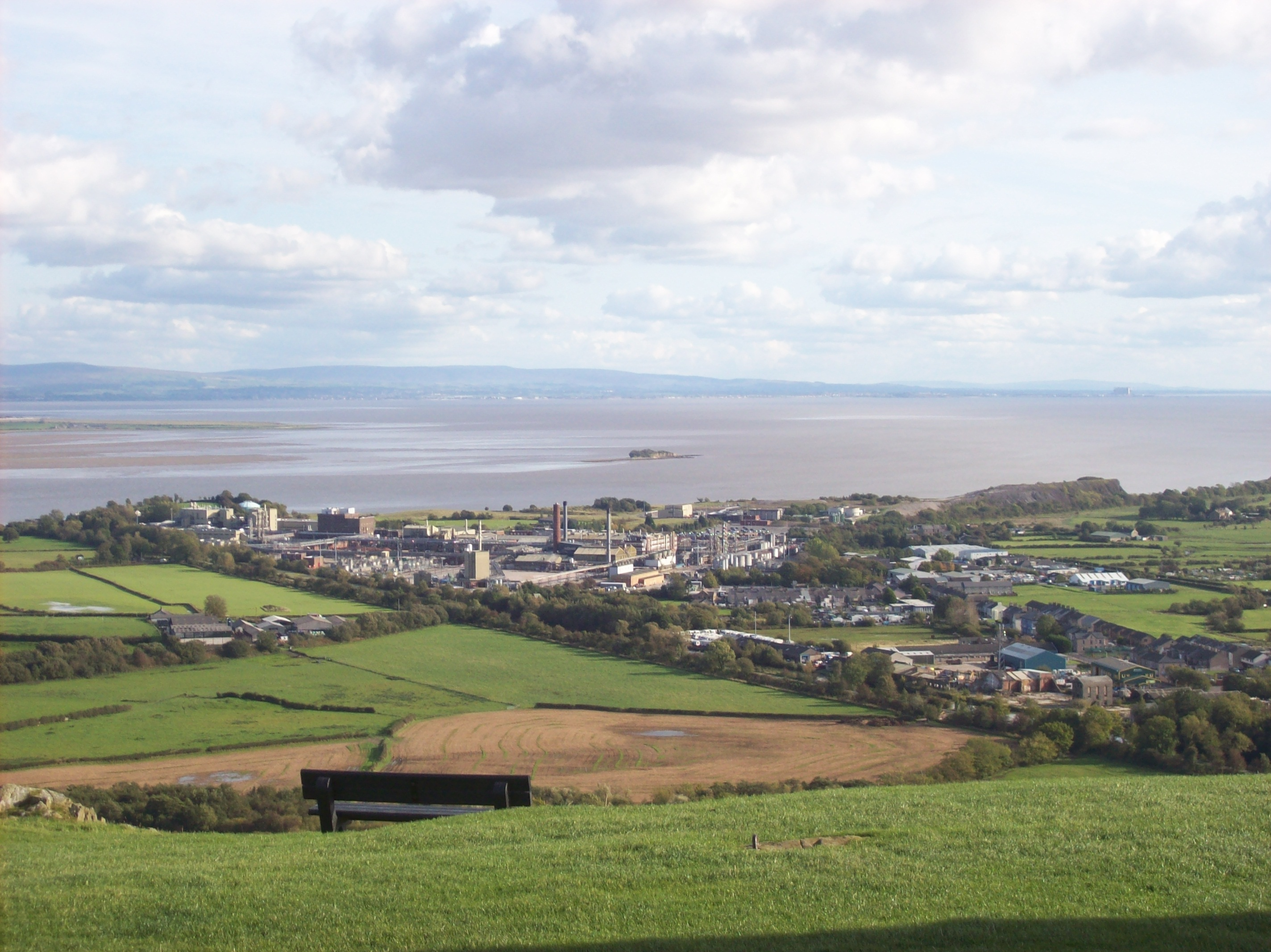
Morecambe Bay from Ulverston

The bay has quicksand and fast moving tides. There have been royally appointed local guides (holding the post of King's Guide to the Sands) for crossing the bay for centuries; appointment of guides is now delegated to a trust. This difficulty of crossing the bay added to the isolation of the land to its north which, due to the presence of the mountains of the Lake District, could only be reached by crossing these sands or by ferry, until the Furness Railway was built in 1857. This skirts the edge of the bay, crossing the various estuaries. The London-Glasgow railway also briefly runs alongside the bay – the only place where the West Coast Main Line actually runs alongside the coast.

The dangers presented by the bay were demonstrated in the 2004 Morecambe Bay cockling disaster when 23 illegal immigrants from China were drowned by an incoming tide, after being cut off while harvesting cockles. Criminal prosecution of the gangmaster and his associates for manslaughter and aiding immigration offences resulted in terms of imprisonment. These events were covered in a drama film and a non-fiction documentary. The incident has had a lasting effect on the community and estuary harvesting regulations.

Morecambe Bay is also home to several of the UK's offshore wind farms: West of Duddon Sands, Burbo Bank, Walney, Barrow, and Ormonde.

== Population ==
Places on Morecambe Bay

Around 320,000 people live along the coastline of Morecambe Bay, with the largest town being Barrow-in-Furness to the west. Morecambe was once a popular seaside holiday destination, whilst Barrow still relies on the seas for a large percentage of its economy in ship and submarine construction.

Town	County	Population
Barrow-in-Furness	Cumbria	69,000
Morecambe	Lancashire	34,800
Fleetwood	Lancashire	25,900
Ulverston	Cumbria	11,200
Heysham	Lancashire	8,500
Grange-over-Sands	Cumbria	4,000

== Natural gas ==
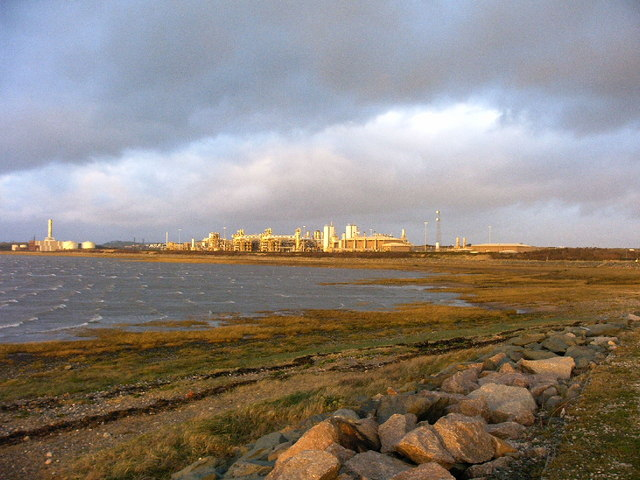
Rampside Gas Terminal

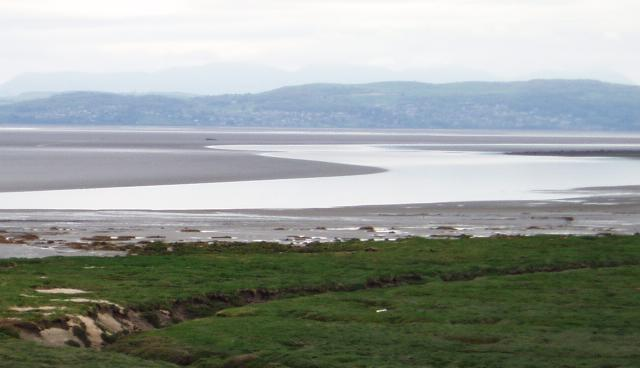
Morecambe Bay at low tide from Hest Bank, looking towards Grange-over-Sands

The bay has Britain's second-largest natural gas field, in the Triassic Sherwood Sandstone with a seal of Mercia Mudstone and a Carboniferous source. The South Morecambe Field, covering an area of 32 mi^{2} (83 km^{2}), was discovered in 1974 and the first gas came ashore in 1985. The North Morecambe Field, found in 1976, 8 mi (13 km) to the north, is 11 mi^{2} (28 km^{2}) and started production in 1994. Both are operated by Centrica Energy. They are 25 mi (40 km) west of Blackpool in 30 metres of water; the top of the gas reservoir is at a depth of just 900 m (3,000 ft), necessitating slant drilling for the first time in European waters. The combined gas reserves on discovery were estimated at 179 billion cubic metres (6.45 trillion cubic feet (tcf)). A further 0.65tcf is recognised in the satellite fields of Bains, Calder (Rivers), Dalton, Millom East and Millom West, and a number of smaller fields have been identified.

The gas is landed at three terminals at Westfield Point in Barrow-in-Furness, collectively referred to as the Rampside Gas Terminal. The South Morecambe Central Processing Complex is connected via a 36-inch pipeline to the South Morecambe terminal. North Morecambe gas has a different composition so the unmanned Drilling and Production Platform is linked by a separate 36" wet sealine to the North Morecambe Terminal, where it is stripped of water, CO_{2} and nitrogen. The Rivers Terminal has a dedicated pipeline for sour gas from the Calder field, which must be stripped of hydrogen sulphide before processing by the North Morecambe Terminal. The hydrogen sulphide is converted to sulphuric acid which is sold for industrial use. In 1991 a 229 MW CCGT power plant was opened near the terminals, on the site of the former coal-fired Roosecote Power Station. There is a support base at Heysham Port and personnel are typically moved by helicopter from Blackpool International Airport. Five rig workers and the two pilots of a Eurocopter AS365 Dauphin were lost when it crashed in sight of the platform on 27 December 2006.

At peak production 15% of UK supply came from the two main fields. As of 2006 Centrica reckoned there was about 1.2tcf of economic gas remaining in them, and they planned to operate the fields for another 10–15 years. In June 2011 they announced the South Morecambe field would be suspended as a result of tax increases in the 2011 Budget which meant South Morecambe would be paying a rate of 81% tax; North Morecambe and Rivers would continue in production as they are taxed at 62%. Production resumed from the South Morecambe field in July 2011.

== Bridge and tidal barrage proposal ==
In 2004, a proposal was made to build a bridge across the bay flanked by wind turbines and using tidal power. Proposals from Northern Tidal Power Gateways in 2019 outlined a tidal barrage with a road running along on top.

== Media ==
- A brief article by David Cawley on the Morecambe Bay tidal crossing appeared in the September 2005 issue of Hidden Europe magazine.
- A fictionalised account of the Morecambe Bay cockling disaster was made into a 2006 drama film Ghosts by documentary maker Nick Broomfield; Channel 4's documentary series The Other Side commissioned a factual work from a local Cumbrian filmmaker on the same events.
- The crime drama television series The Bay is set in and around Morecambe Bay, and derives its name from the location. Location filming for the series was shot around the area.
- A book about the bay, The Gathering Tide: A Journey Around the Edgelands of Morecambe Bay (2016) by environmentalist Karen Lloyd, is a memoir of a year spent walking the coast, involving social history, archaeology and local wildlife.

== See also ==
- Cross Bay Walk
