= Chapel Island =

Island in Morecambe Bay, England

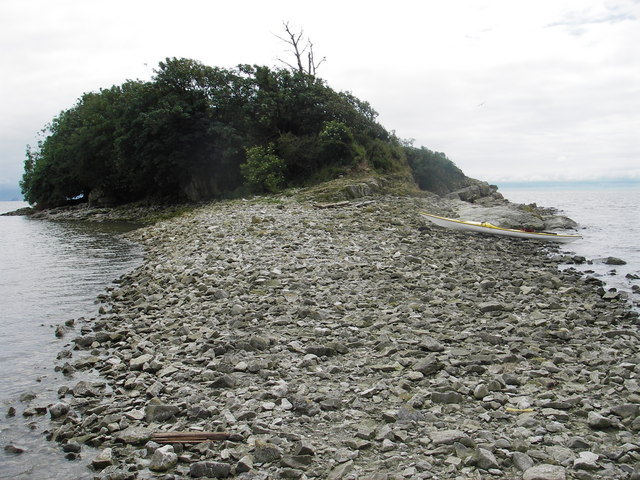
- Spit of Chapel Island

- Location in South Lakeland Location on Morecambe Bay

Geography
- Location: Morecambe Bay
- Coordinates: 54.1741°N 3.0416°W
- Archipelago: British Isles

Administration
- United Kingdom
- County: Cumbria

Chapel Island is a limestone outcrop that lies in the Leven estuary of Morecambe Bay in England, less than one mile (1.6 km) from the shoreline at Bardsea in the area known as Ulverston Sands. It is located at 54.1741°N 3.0416°W (OS grid ref. SD 321759). It is one of the Islands of Furness in the county of Cumbria, in the area of the historic county of Lancashire ("Lancashire north of the sands"). The island is approximately 450 yards (410 m) long and just over 100 yards (91 m) at its widest. Its area is about 7.5 acres (3.0 hectares).

Chapel Island, known as Harlesyde Isle in 1593, got its present name in 1795. The name was coined by Mrs. Radcliffe in her book ‘Tour of the Lakes’.

In the 14th century Augustinian canons from nearby Conishead Priory built a small chapel on the island to serve the needs of travellers and fishermen working in the Leven fisheries. The Island lies on the path of the ancient crossing from Cartmel to Conishead and would have been a place of haven to travellers caught out by the tide. Tradition describes its purpose to be the meeting for prayers with the travellers who cross the bay. In 1843 Jopling notes that the crossing passed to the south of the island, implying that the route past the island varied over time.

Nothing remains of the original chapel, although Thomas West noted that these ruins were still extant in 1774. In 1821 Colonel Thomas Richard Gale Braddyll commenced building the modern-day Conishead Priory and to enhance the view from the priory he had a mock pseudo-classical ruin built on the island. This chapel ruin is now sometimes mistaken for the remains of the original.

There was also a cottage on the island, probably also built in the early 19th century, which was ostensibly occupied by fishermen. It is mentioned that fishermen occupy the cottage ‘at the instance of the owner of the Priory who has erected a cottage close to the ruins. In 1851 the cottage was occupied by Thomas Benson, a mariner, his wife and stepson. By 1861 Edward Barker, his wife and three sons, all the men being fishermen, were the occupiers. The 1871 Census shows that only the sons were resident and they were no longer fishermen, now occupied as quarrymen. It is probable that they were employed at the quarry on the Conishead estate. The 1881 had no entry for Chapel island so it is possible that they were the last occupants of the cottage, which is now a ruin.

In 1837 Chapel Island was proposed as a railway station by George Stephenson who was considering alternatives to the hilly route over Shap Fell, which the main West Coast line to Glasgow now takes. His idea was to take the railway from Lancaster to Morecambe (then known as Poulton), before proceeding across the sands to Humphrey Head on the Cartmel Peninsula and then cross the Leven Estuary to Furness. Embankments would have been built on the sands, with the area inside of these reclaimed.

On 6 October 1858 the sloop Delight of Ulverston grounded on the rocks of Chapel Island. She was carrying a cargo of iron ore and empties. Her master was lost in the accident.

Chapel Island is referred to by William Wordsworth in The Prelude, Book Tenth. The penultimate paragraph of the books reads:

As I advanced, all that I saw or felt
Was gentleness and peace. Upon a small
And rocky island near, a fragment stood,
(Itself like a sea rock) the low remains
(With shells encrusted, dark with briny weeds)
Of a dilapidated structure, once
A Romish chapel, where the vested priest
Said matins at the hour that suited those
Who crossed the sands with ebb of morning tide.
Not far from that still ruin all the plain
Lay spotted with a variegated crowd
Of vehicles and travellers, horse and foot,
Wading beneath the conduct of their guide
In loose procession through the shallow stream
Of inland waters; the great sea meanwhile
Heaved at safe distance, far retired. I paused,
Longing for skill to paint a scene so bright
And cheerful, but the foremost of the band
As he approached, no salutation given
In the familiar language of the day,
Cried, "Robespierre is dead!" nor was a doubt,
After strict question, left within my mind
That he and his supporters all were fallen.

Excellent beaches can be found at Chapel Island. Apart from a small area at the north of the island the land is completely overgrown with an impenetrable mat of brambles. The island can be accessed on foot at low tide. However, Morecambe Bay is notorious for quicksands, and the Ulverston Channel usually flows between the shore and the island. Those wishing to visit Chapel Island should not attempt the crossing at any time other than low tide and should seek local advice.

== Sources ==
- A Story of the Growth of Ulverston, by Dorothy Ashburner. Published 1993.
