= Piel Island =

Tidal island in Cumbria, England

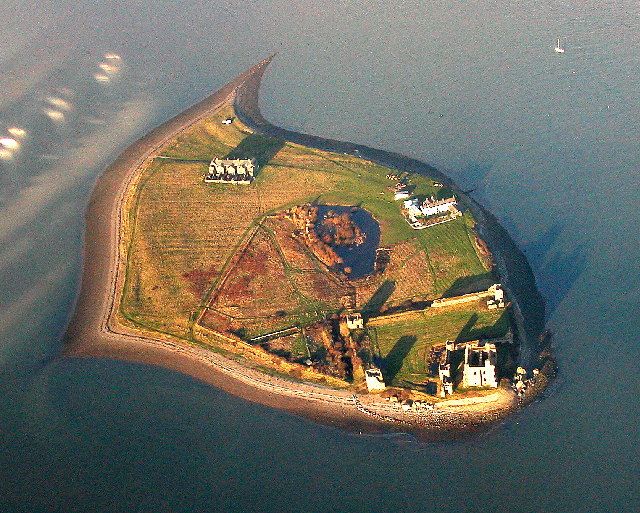
- An aerial view of Piel Island

- Location in Barrow-in-Furness Borough Location in Morecambe Bay Location in Cumbria

Geography
- Location: Morecambe Bay
- Coordinates: 54°3′50″N 3°10′30″W
- Archipelago: British Isles

Administration
- England
- County: Cumbria

Piel Island lies in Morecambe Bay, around 1/2 mile (800 metres) off the southern tip of the Furness peninsula in the administrative county of Cumbria, England. It is one of the Islands of Furness, three of which sit near to Piel at the mouth of Walney Channel. The island is the location of Piel Castle, built by the monks of Furness Abbey in the fourteenth century.

Historically within Lancashire, the island today is owned by the town of Barrow-in-Furness, having been given to the people by the Duke of Buccleuch in 1922. The council's administrative duties also include the selection of the "King" of Piel, who is the landlord of the island's public house, the Ship Inn. Piel is about 26 acres (11 hectares) in size. The landlord and their family and three others who live in the old Ship's pilots' cottages are the island's only permanent residents.

== History ==
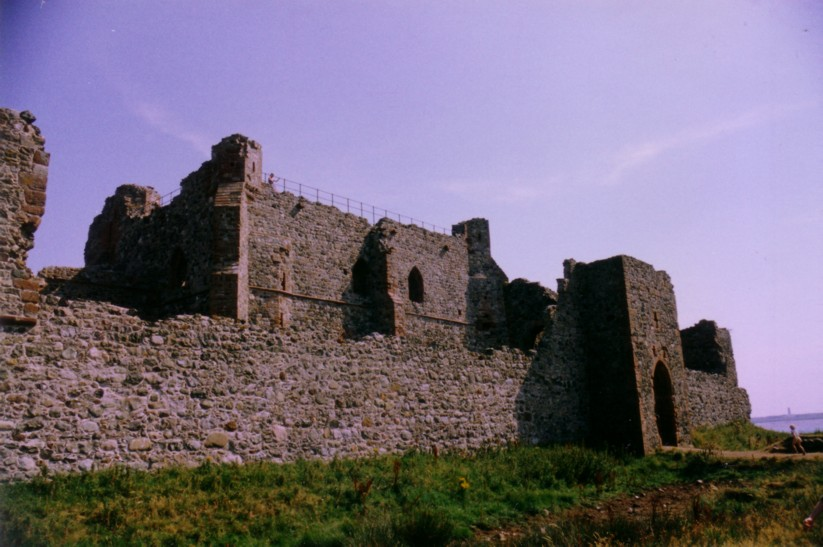
Piel Castle

In the Middle Ages Piel was known as Fowdray (or Fouldrey or Fowdrey) island. This name would seem to be derived from the Old Norse words fouder, meaning "fodder", and ay or oy, meaning "island". The island was part of the Liberty of Furness, granted in 1066 to Earl Tostig, and 1127 it formed part of the Liberty that was granted by King Stephen to the Savignac monks as part of a land grant for an abbey. When the Savignacs became part of the Cistercian order later in the 12th century, the island came under the control of the Cistercians at nearby Furness Abbey. The Cistercians increased their power, and soon controlled the whole of the Furness, including Piel. In the early 13th century the Cistercians used Piel as a safe harbour and built a warehouse for the storage of grain, wine and wool. Some of these commodities were shipped over from Ireland. In 1212 the monks were granted a licence by King John to land one cargo of "wheat, flour and other provisions" to stave off a famine caused by the failure of the local harvest. Later in the century an unlimited cargo licence was granted and in 1258 ships owned by the abbey were placed under royal protection.

The monks fortified the island, firstly with a wooden tower surrounded by a ditch with palisades, and then in 1327 they commenced the building of a motte and bailey fort (also known as a "peel"—hence the island's modern name). This structure was, at the time, the largest of its kind in northwest England. It was probably built as a fortified warehouse to repel pirates and raiders, but it would appear to have had a measure of success in keeping the customs men at bay as well; smuggling was widespread at the time and the abbey was known to have been involved. Indeed, in 1423 an accusation was made against the Abbott of Furness that he smuggled wool out of the country from "la Peele de Foddray". The red sandstone ruins of the fort came to be known as the "Pile of Fouldrey", and are known today as Piel Castle.

The next noteworthy episode in the island's history occurred on 4 June 1487 when Lambert Simnel and his supporters arrived from Dublin. Simnel, crowned as "Edward VI" in Ireland, was being passed off as Edward, 17th Earl of Warwick, the Yorkist heir, by John de la Pole, Earl of Lincoln in his attempt to regain the throne for the Yorkists. Simnel and 2,000 German mercenaries made their way via Piel to do battle for the throne. They were eventually defeated at the Battle of Stoke near Newark-on-Trent in Nottinghamshire on 16 June 1487.

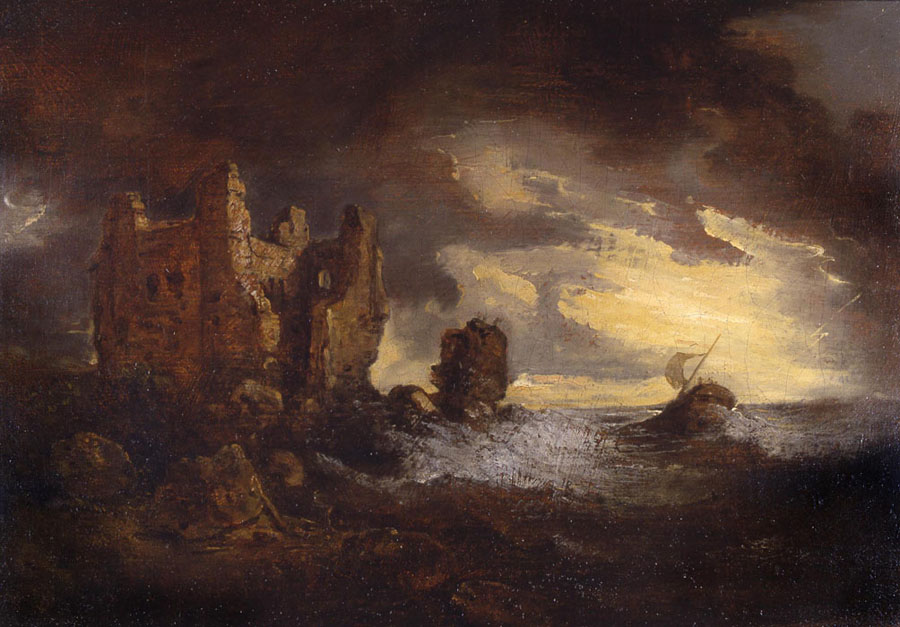
Sir George Beaumont's 1805 painting Peele [sic] Castle in a Storm

Following the Dissolution of the Monasteries in 1537 Piel Island and its castle became the property of the king. The castle's fortifications were strengthened at the time of the Spanish Armada but from then until the Civil War nothing of note happened on the island. The area of Furness was a Parliamentarian stronghold during the Civil War. For this reason the Parliamentarian fleet retreated to Piel Harbour when the Royalists captured Liverpool.

In 1662, following the restoration of Charles II, the lordship of Furness was given to the Duke of Albemarle and this included the castle and parts of the island. After this date activity on Piel seems to have revolved around shipping and industry. A salt works is recorded as existing on the island from as early as 1662, which was still apparently present in the 1690s.

Piel Island became an important trading post during the 18th century and customs men were permanently stationed there; smuggling was still rife at the time. In the second half of the 18th century the iron ore trade began to develop on the Furness Peninsula and the harbour continued to be important to the local economy. As the volume of shipping increased "His Majesty's boatmen" were stationed on Piel as harbour pilots and customs inspectors. In formal terms, it was a creek (outstation) of the port of Lancaster, and known as Piel Foudray. The impact of industry was relatively low on the appearance of the island, however, and in the 19th century the ruins of the castle became a major attraction to the romanticist art movement. The island was painted in 1805 by Sir George Beaumont, a painting which inspired William Wordsworth's Elegiac Stanzas, based also on his own time living at Rampside with a view out to Piel.

The ownership of Piel Island eventually descended to the Duke of Buccleuch. The 5th Duke heavily developed industry around Furness, and in 1875 had the fishermen's cottages built on the island. The 7th Duke later donated the island to the people of Barrow-in-Furness in 1920 as a World War I memorial.

== Today ==
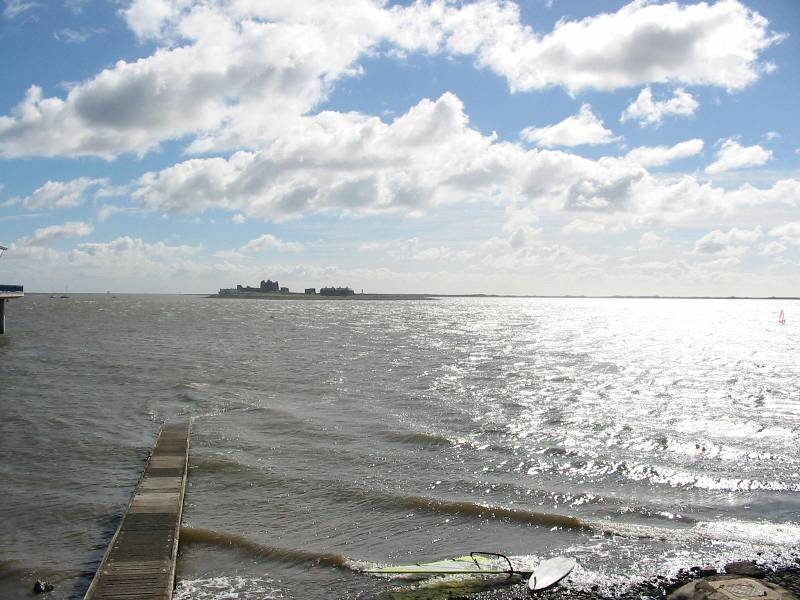
Piel Island from Roa Island

Being separated from neighbouring Roa Island by the Piel Channel, the island is accessible via a ferryboat from Roa Island pier during summer and subject to the tides and weather. Piel can be reached on foot or by off-road vehicle (licenses are required to drive on the sands) from Walney Island, but this route is only passable with care at low tide; local guidance is recommended. Piel Castle is managed by English Heritage and there is free, unlimited access once on the island. The castle, located on the southeast tip of Piel Island, is an impressive ruin made up largely of stones from the beach. The three-storey keep affords good views of the island although it is no longer accessible to visitors. Campers may pitch a tent on the island.

The island is a haven for wildlife with many different species of sea bird to be found. Visitors should take care not to disturb nesting birds while walking on the beach. A marsh pond in the centre of the island now attracts many other types of bird.

== The Ship Inn ==
The origins of the Ship Inn are obscure; it is said to be over 300 years old, but the evidence is uncertain. In 1746 a lease for agricultural land situated within the castle ditch was granted to an Edward Postlethwaite, who is described as an innkeeper from the 'Pile of Fowdrey'. The earliest direct reference to an inn, or 'publick house', is in 1800. In 1813 a visitor painted a vivid picture of the life of the innkeeper at that time:

"There is a public-house on the island, the only habitation, tenanted by an old Scotchman, who has been lord of this domain for many years, and goes through the duties of guide and expositor among the ruins of the castle with admirable fluency. The custom of the seamen from the roadstead, and the donations of occasional visitors in the summer time, support him in a state of which he has no right, he thinks, to complain; but he acknowledged that when there were no vessels in the roadstead he found his situation rather too lonesome, and apt to drive him to his beer-barrel for company."

The earliest map reference, in 1833, refers to the inn as 'The Herdhouse', and the first person who can confidently be identified as a landlord of the Ship Inn is James Hool as he is listed in the 1841 census as a publican.

The landlord of the Ship Inn pub is known as 'The King of Piel', a title instituted in the 19th century and harking back to Lambert Simnel and his attempt to usurp the English throne. A tradition handed down by fishermen for centuries is the 'Knighthood of Piel'. In a room of the inn is a large oak chair and anyone who sits in it is made a 'Knight of Piel'. The ceremonial knighting is carried out by the King of Piel or a fellow knight. The present-day cost of becoming a knight is to buy a round of drinks for all those present. However, the privilege afforded to knights is that they may demand food and lodging of the innkeeper should they be shipwrecked on Piel.

The longest recorded serving landlords were Thomas and Elizabeth Ashburner, c.1894-c.1922, and the 20-year licence of Rod and Karen Scarr which ended in November 2005 is the second-longest recorded. Following their departure in 2006 the pub was fully renovated by Barrow Borough Council, with work beginning in 2008, shortly before the new 'King of Piel', Steve Chattaway, was crowned (an event that was documented in the TV series Islands of Britain). The Chattaways left in 2020, with the new landlord Aaron Sanderson moving in during May 2022.
