= List of islands in the Irish Sea =

This is a list of islands in the Irish Sea.

Listed below are islands in the Irish Sea which are over 1 km^{2} in area, or which have a permanent population:

Name	Area (km^{2})	Rank (area)	Permanent Population	Rank (pop.)	Country
Anglesey	714	01	69,000	02	Wales
Isle of Man	572	02	80,056	01	Isle of Man
Holy Island	39	03	13,579	03	Wales
Walney Island	13	04	11,388	04	England
Lambay Island	5.54	05	<10	08	Republic of Ireland
Bull Island	3	06	<20	07	Republic of Ireland
Bardsey Island	2.58	08	<5	10	Wales
Calf of Man	2.50	09	0	-	Isle of Man
Barrow Island	Unknown	-	2,616	05	England
Roa Island	Unknown	-	100	06	England
Ynys Gaint	Unknown	-	<10	08	Wales
Piel Island	0.20	-	<5	10	England
Ynys Castell	Unknown	-	<5	10	Wales
Ynys Gored Goch	0.004	-	<5	10	Wales

== Other islands ==
- Cardigan Island
- Chapel Island
- Chicken Rock
- Church Island
- Cribinau
- Dova Haw
- East Mouse
- Foulney Island
- Headin Haw
- Hestan Island
- Ireland's Eye
- Islands of Fleet
- Kitterland
- Little Ross
- Middle Mouse
- North Stack
- Puffin Island
- Rough Island
- St Mary's Isle
- St Michael's Isle
- St Patrick's Isle
- Saint Tudwal's Islands
- Salt Island
- The Scares
- Sheep Island
- The Skerries
- South Stack
- West Mouse
- Ynys Benlas
- Ynys Dulas
- Ynys Feurig
- Ynys Gaint
- Ynys Llanddwyn
- Ynys Lochtyn
- Ynys Moelfre
- Ynys y Bîg

== See also ==
- List of islands of England
- List of islands of Ireland
- List of islands of the Isle of Man
- List of islands of Wales
- List of islands of Europe
- List of islands
