= List of islands of Wales =

This is a list of islands of Wales, the mainland of which is part of Great Britain, as well as a table of the largest Welsh islands by area. The list includes tidal islands such as Sully Island but not locations such as Shell Island which, though they are termed islands, are peninsulas.

Name	Island group/location
Anglesey (Ynys Môn)	Anglesey
Ballast Bank/Lewis's Island (Cei Ballast)	Porthmadog (artificial island formed from ships ballast)
Bardsey Island (Ynys Enlli)	Gwynedd
Barry Island (Ynys y Barri)	Vale of Glamorgan (linked to the mainland since the 1880s)
Burry Holms	Gower
Caldey Island (Ynys Bŷr)	Pembrokeshire
Cardigan Island (Ynys Aberteifi)	Ceredigion
Carreg Onnen	Pembrokeshire
Carreg Rhoson	Pembrokeshire
Carreg yr Halen	Anglesey
Church Island (Ynys Dysilio)	Anglesey
Cribinau (Ynys Cribinau)	Anglesey
Daufraich	Pembrokeshire
Denny Island (Ynys Denny)	Monmouthshire
East Mouse (Ynys Amlwch)	Anglesey
Emsger	Pembrokeshire
Flat Holm (Ynys Echni)	Bristol Channel
Gateholm	Pembrokeshire (tidal island)
Grassholm (Gwales/Ynys Gwales)	Pembrokeshire
Holy Island (Ynys Gybi)	Anglesey
Maen Gwenonwy	Llŷn Peninsula (tidal island)
Middle Head	Gower (tidal island)
Middle Mouse (Ynys Badrig)	Anglesey
Middleholm (aka Midland Isle)	Pembrokeshire
Mumbles Head Island (Y Mwmbwls)	Gower (tidal island)
North Stack (Ynys Arw)	Anglesey
Puffin Island (Ynys Seiriol)	Anglesey
Ramsey Island (Ynys Dewi)	Pembrokeshire
St Catherine's Island (Ynys Catrin)	Pembrokeshire
St Margaret's Island (Ynys Farged)	Pembrokeshire
St Tudwal's Island East (Ynys Tudwal Fach)	St Tudwal's Islands
St Tudwal's Island West (Ynys Tudwal Fawr)	St Tudwal's Islands
Salt Island (Ynys yr Halen)	Anglesey
Sheep Island (Ynys y defaid)	Pembrokeshire (tidal island)
The Skerries (Ynysoedd y Moelrhoniaid)	Anglesey
Skokholm (Ynys Sgoc-holm)	Pembrokeshire
Skomer (Ynys Skomer)	Pembrokeshire
South Stack (Ynys Lawd)	Anglesey
Sully Island	Vale of Glamorgan (tidal island)
Thorn Island	Pembrokeshire
Tusker Rock (Ynys Twsgr)	Vale of Glamorgan
West Mouse (Maen y Bugail)	Anglesey
Worms Head (Pen Pyrod)	Gower (tidal island)
Ynys Benlas	Anglesey
Ynys Beri	Pembrokeshire
Ynys Cantwr	Pembrokeshire
Ynys Castell	Anglesey
Ynys Dulas	Anglesey
Ynys Eilun & Pont yr Eilun	Pembrokeshire
Ynys Faelog	Anglesey
Ynys Feurig	Anglesey
Ynys Gaint	Anglesey
Ynys Gifftan	Gwynedd (tidal island)
Ynys Gored Goch	Anglesey
Ynys Gwylan-fach	Gwynedd
Ynys Gwylan-fawr	Gwynedd
Ynys Gwelltog	Pembrokeshire
Ynys Llanddwyn	Anglesey (tidal island)
Ynys Lochtyn	Ceredigion
Ynys Meicel	Pembrokeshire
Ynys Moelfre	Anglesey
Ynys Onnen	Pembrokeshire
Ynys Welltog	Anglesey
Ynys y Bîg	Anglesey

== Largest islands in Wales ==
	Island	Area (sq mi)	Area (km^{2})
1	Anglesey	260.37	674.36
2	Holy Island	15.22	39.44
3	Skomer	1.12	2.90
4	Ramsey Island	0.99	2.58
5	Caldey Island	0.84	2.18
6	Bardsey Island	0.79	2.06
7	Skokholm	0.41	1.06
8	Flat Holm	0.21	0.33
9	Ynys Llanddwyn	0.19	0.3
10	Puffin Island	0.11	0.28
11	Cardigan Island	0.06	0.15

- Holy Island and Anglesey are often counted together as they are separated by such a narrow channel.

== Inland islands ==
There are no islands of any great size in lakes in Wales. The crannog in Llangorse Lake is an artificial island. Several reservoirs contain islets e.g. Llyn Brenig, Elan Valley Reservoirs and Llyn Trawsfynydd, the last named having the largest and most numerous, though some are linked by causeways.

== See also ==
- List of the British Isles
