= List of islands by name (Y) =

This article features a list of islands sorted by their name beginning with the letter Y.

== Y ==
Island's Name	Island group(s)	Country/Countries
Yakushima	Ōsumi Islands part of the Satsunan Islands part of the Ryukyu Islands	Japan
Isla Yallis	Vieques, Puerto Rico	United States
Yelagin	Neva River	Russia
Yell	Shetland Islands	Scotland
Yellow	Bahamas	Bahamas
Cayo Yerba	Culebra, Puerto Rico	United States
Yerba Buena	San Francisco Bay, California	United States
Yeo	Lake Huron, Ontario	Canada
Yeoman Island	Nunavut	Canada
Yeongjong	Incheon	South Korea
Yeoseodo		South Korea
Yeouido	Han River	South Korea
Yijiangshan	Taiwan Strait	China
Ynys Benlas	North Wales	Wales
Ynys Castell	North Wales	Wales
Ynys Feurig	North Wales	Wales
Ynys Gaint	North Wales	Wales
Ynys Gored Goch	North Wales	Wales
Ynys Llanddwyn	North Wales	Wales
Ynys y Bîg	North Wales	Wales
Yonaguni	Yaeyama Islands part of the Sakishima Islands part of the Ryukyu Islands	Japan
York	Apostle Islands, Wisconsin	United States
York	Arkansas	United States
York	Leeward Islands of the Lesser Antilles	Antigua and Barbuda
Yoronjima	Amami Islands part of the Satsunan Islands part of the Ryukyu Islands	Japan
Yoroshima	Amami Islands part of the Satsunan Islands part of the Ryukyu Islands	Japan
Young Cay	Bahamas	Bahamas
Young	Vermont	United States
Young	Balleny Islands	Ross Dependency, New Zealand
Young		Saint Vincent and the Grenadines
Youngs	Alabama	United States
Youngs	Alabama	United States
Yubujima	Yaeyama Islands part of the Sakishima Islands part of the Ryukyu Islands	Japan
Yuma	Bahamas	Bahamas
Yunaska	Islands of Four Mountains, Alaska	United States
Yuzhny	Novaya Zemlya, Arkhangelsk Oblast	Russia

== See also ==
- List of islands (by country)
- List of islands by area
- List of islands by population
- List of islands by highest point
