= Glannau Porthaethwy =

Protected area in Anglesey, Wales

- Site of Special Scientific Interest
- Location within Wales
- Location of Glannau Porthaethwy.
- Area of search: West Gwynedd
- Grid reference: SH5613972183
- Coordinates: 53.227°N 4.157°W
- Interest: Biological
- Area: 67.7 hectares (167 acres)
- Notification date: 2003

Glannau Porthaethwy is a designated Site of Special Scientific Interest (SSSI) along the northern shore of the Menai Strait in North Wales. It is a linear designation that extends some 4 km (2.5 mi) along the shore from Britannia Bridge in the west to Craig y Don in the east. It also includes the island shorelines of Ynys Gorad Goch, Ynys Welltog, Ynys Benlas, Ynys Tysilio, Half Tide Rock, Ynys Faelog, Ynys Tobig, Ynys Gaint, Ynys Castell and Ynys y Big.

It was designated in 2003, as it is the most extensive sheltered rock shore in the area between Bardsey Island and Great Orme’s Head and because it supports the greatest diversity of marine plant and animal communities.
