= Half Tide Rock (disambiguation) =

Half Tide Rock is a small rocky island in south-eastern Australia.

Half Tide Rock may also refer to:

- Half Tide Rock, Glannau Porthaethwy, in the Menai Strait, Wales
- Half tide rock, Lady Isle, in the Firth of Clyde, Scotland.
- Half-tide rock, nickname of the breastwork monitor warship
- Half-tide rock, nickname of the Cherokee-class brig-sloop
