= The Skerries, Anglesey =

Group of rocky islets in Wales

Coordinates: 53°25′19.2″N 4°36′29″W

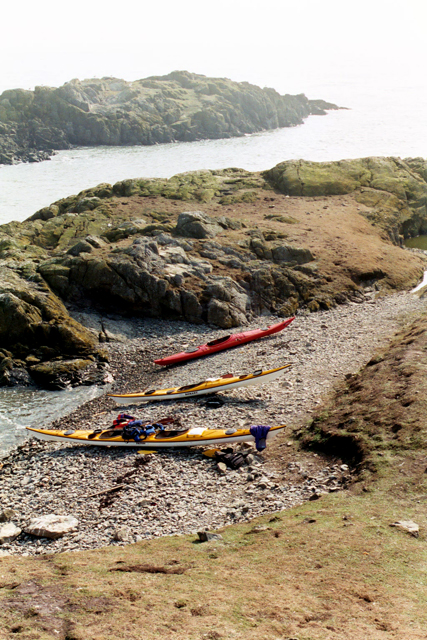
One of the islets

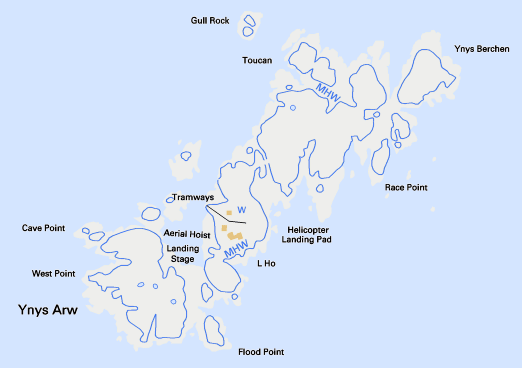
Map of The Skerries

The Skerries (Welsh: Ynysoedd y Moelrhoniaid) (grid reference SH268948), coming from the Old Norse word sker, are a group of sparsely vegetated rocky islets (skerries), with a total area of about 17 hectares (42 acres) lying 3 kilometres (1.9 mi) offshore from Carmel Head at the northwest corner of Anglesey, Wales. The islands are important as a breeding site for seabirds, and they attract divers, who come to visit the numerous shipwrecks. The Skerries Lighthouse sits atop the highest point in the islands.

The islands can be visited by charter boat from Holyhead. The individual islets are accessible from one another at low tide and by small bridges.

The name "Skerry" is the Scottish diminutive of the Old Norse "sker", and means a small rocky reef or island. The Welsh name for these islands, 'Ynysoedd y Moelrhoniaid', means "Islands of the Seals". An alternative name provided by some English-language sources is 'St Daniel's Isle'.

== Seabirds ==
The islands have a seabird colony, which is particularly important for the Arctic tern, numbers of which are nationally important; the roseate tern breeds occasionally in very small numbers. In 2018 two roseate tern chicks fledged here for the first time in a decade. The following species also breed: Atlantic puffin, black-legged kittiwake, common tern, herring gull and lesser black-backed gull.

Because of these birds, in particular the terns, the island has been designated as part of the Ynys Feurig, Cemlyn Bay and The Skerries Special Protection Area along with two other nearby sites, Cemlyn Bay and Ynys Feurig, and all three are also classed by BirdLife International as an Important Bird Area. The Skerries have also been designated as a Site of Special Scientific Interest.

Terns interchange regularly between all three sites, and form part of a larger Irish Sea tern population together with birds at sites in Ireland such as Rockabill Island. The islands are wardened by the RSPB during the tern breeding season, and management measures they have undertaken here include control of introduced tree mallow (Lavatera arborea) and provision of nestboxes; these measures as aimed particularly at helping to increase the attractiveness of the site to breeding roseate terns, although it is accepted that the future number of pairs of this species here is primarily dependent on the overall health of the Irish Sea population.

The site came to national attention among birders briefly in July 2005 when it attracted a sooty tern, a species which only a very small number of birders had previously seen in Britain.

== Tidal power ==
The area between the islands and mainland Anglesey is the site of the planned Skerries Tidal Stream Array, being developed by Marine Current Turbines and RWE npower.
