= Gansey =

Gansey may refer to:-

- MV Gansey, an Empire F type coaster in service with C M & D M Watterson, Isle of Man, 1954–1964
- Guernsey (clothing), seaman's knitted woolen sweater also called a "Gansey"
- Steve Gansey, American former basketball player and head coach for the College Park Skyhawks of the NBA G League
- Mike Gansey, American former professional basketball player and assistant general manager of the Cleveland Cavaliers of the National Basketball Association
- Gansey, Isle of Man, a location
