= List of islands of the British Isles =

This article is a list of some of the islands that form the British Isles that have an area of 1 square kilometre (247 acres) or larger, listing area and population data. The total area of the islands is 314,965 km^{2} (121,609 sq mi). Great Britain accounts for the larger part of this area at 66%, with Ireland accounting for 26%, leaving the remaining 8%—an area of 23,996 km^{2} (9,265 sq mi)—consisting of thousands of smaller islands. The largest of the other islands are to be found in the Hebrides and the Northern Isles to the north, and Anglesey and the Isle of Man between Great Britain and Ireland. Not included are the Channel Islands which, positioned off the coast of France, are not part of the archipelago.

There are 188 permanently inhabited islands in total:

- Isle of Man: 1
- Republic of Ireland: 62 and a part of Ireland
- United Kingdom: 123 plus Great Britain and a part of Ireland
  - England: 19
  - Northern Ireland: 1 and a part of Ireland
  - Scotland: 97
  - Wales: 6

== List of islands by area ==
List of islands showing area, population and location
Name	Area		Population	Location	Country or dependency
Name	km^{2}	mi^{2}	Population	Location	Country or dependency
Great Britain	209,331	80,823	60,800,000	—N/a	England, Scotland and Wales, United Kingdom
Ireland	81,638	31,521	6,378,000	—N/a	Republic of Ireland; Northern Ireland, United Kingdom
Lewis and Harris	2,179	841	19,918	Outer Hebrides	Scotland, United Kingdom
Skye	1,656	639	9,232	Inner Hebrides	Scotland, United Kingdom
Mainland (Shetland)	969	374	17,550	Shetland Islands	Scotland, United Kingdom
Mull	875	338	2,667	Inner Hebrides	Scotland, United Kingdom
Anglesey (including Holy Island)	714	276	69,000	Irish Sea	Wales, United Kingdom
Islay	620	239	3,457	Inner Hebrides	Scotland, United Kingdom
Isle of Man	572	221	80,056	Irish Sea	Isle of Man
Mainland (Orkney)	523	202	17,162	Orkney Islands	Scotland, United Kingdom
Arran	432	167	5,045	Firth of Clyde	Scotland, United Kingdom
Isle of Wight	381	147	132,731	English Channel	England, United Kingdom
Jura	367	142	188	Inner Hebrides	Scotland, United Kingdom
South Uist	320	124	1,818	Outer Hebrides	Scotland, United Kingdom
North Uist	303	117	1,271	Outer Hebrides	Scotland, United Kingdom
Yell	212	82	957	Shetland Islands	Scotland, United Kingdom
Achill Island	147	57	2,620	County Mayo	Republic of Ireland
Hoy	143	55	272	Orkney Islands	Scotland, United Kingdom
Bute	122	47	7,228	Firth of Clyde	Scotland, United Kingdom
Unst	121	47	720	Shetland Islands	Scotland, United Kingdom
Rùm	105	41	22	Small Isles	Scotland, United Kingdom
Isle of Sheppey	94	36	37,852	Kent	England, United Kingdom
Benbecula	82	32	1,219	Outer Hebrides	Scotland, United Kingdom
Tiree	78	30	770	Inner Hebrides	Scotland, United Kingdom
Coll	77	30	164	Inner Hebrides	Scotland, United Kingdom
Raasay	64	25	192	Inner Hebrides	Scotland, United Kingdom
Great Island	61	24	>13,000	Cork	Republic of Ireland
Barra	59	23	1,078	Outer Hebrides	Scotland, United Kingdom
Sanday	50	19	478	Orkney Islands	Scotland, United Kingdom
South Ronaldsay	50	19	458	Orkney Islands	Scotland, United Kingdom
Rousay	49	19	212	Orkney Islands	Scotland, United Kingdom
Westray	47	18	563	Orkney Islands	Scotland, United Kingdom
Fetlar	41	16	86	Shetland Islands	Scotland, United Kingdom
Colonsay	41	16	108	Inner Hebrides	Scotland, United Kingdom
Holy Island	39	15	13,579	Anglesey	Wales, United Kingdom
Stronsay	33	13	343	Orkney Islands	Scotland, United Kingdom
Inishmore	31	12	824	Aran Islands	Republic of Ireland
Eigg	30	12	67	Small Isles	Scotland, United Kingdom
Shapinsay	30	12	300	Orkney Islands	Scotland, United Kingdom
Bressay	28	11	384	Shetland Islands	Scotland, United Kingdom
Eday	27	10	121	Orkney Islands	Scotland, United Kingdom
Hayling Island	27	10	16,887	Hampshire	England, United Kingdom
Foulness Island	26	10	212	Essex	England, United Kingdom
Valentia Island	26	10	665	County Kerry	Republic of Ireland
Scalpay	25	10	10	Inner Hebrides	Scotland, United Kingdom
Gorumna	24	9	1,010	County Galway	Republic of Ireland
Portsea Island	24	9	147,088	Hampshire	England, United Kingdom
Lismore	24	9	146	Inner Hebrides	Scotland, United Kingdom
Great Bernera	21	8	233	Outer Hebrides	Scotland, United Kingdom
Ulva	20	8	16	Inner Hebrides	Scotland, United Kingdom
Whalsay	20	8	1,034	Shetland Islands	Scotland, United Kingdom
Canvey Island	19	7	37,479	Essex	England, United Kingdom
Mersea Island	18	7	7,182	Essex	England, United Kingdom
Muckle Roe	18	7	104	Shetland Islands	Scotland, United Kingdom
Bere Island or Bear Island	17	7	218	Cork	Republic of Ireland
Arranmore or Aran Island	17	7	478	County Donegal	Republic of Ireland
Rathlin Island	14	5	100	Antrim	Northern Ireland, United Kingdom
Inch Island	14	5	396	County Donegal	Republic of Ireland
Walney Island	13	5	11,388	Furness	England, United Kingdom
Foula	13	5	38	Shetland Islands	Scotland, United Kingdom
Inishbofin	13	5	184	Galway	Republic of Ireland
Great Cumbrae	12	5	1,434	Firth of Clyde	Scotland, United Kingdom
Inishmaan	10	4	157	Aran Islands	Republic of Ireland
Papa Westray	9	3	90	Orkney Islands	Scotland, United Kingdom
Lettermore	9	3	184	Galway	Republic of Ireland
Fair Isle	8	3	65	Shetland Islands	Scotland, United Kingdom
St Mary's	6	2	1,666	Isles of Scilly	England, United Kingdom
Inisheer or Inishere	6	2	343	Galway	Republic of Ireland
Lindisfarne or Holy Island	4	2	180	Northumberland	England, United Kingdom
Lundy	4	2	28	Devon	England, United Kingdom
Tresco	3	1	180	Isles of Scilly	England, United Kingdom
Lambay Island	3	1	7	County Dublin	Republic of Ireland
Calf of Man	3	1	2 (seasonal)	Irish Sea	Isle of Man
Lettermullen or Lettermullan	3	1	214	Galway	Republic of Ireland
Thorney Island	2	1	1,079	West Sussex	England, United Kingdom
Bardsey Island	2	1	4	Gwynedd	Wales, United Kingdom
St Martin's	2	1	142	Isles of Scilly	England, United Kingdom
St Agnes	1	0	73	Isles of Scilly	England, United Kingdom
Bryher	1	0	92	Isles of Scilly	England, United Kingdom

== See also ==
- British Isles
- List of islands in the Atlantic Ocean
- List of islands of England
- List of islands of Ireland
- List of islands of Scotland
  - List of Orkney islands
  - List of Outer Hebrides
  - List of Shetland islands
- List of islands of the Isle of Man
- List of islands of the United Kingdom
- List of islands of Wales
