= Cemlyn Bay and lagoon =

Protected bay in Anglesey, Wales

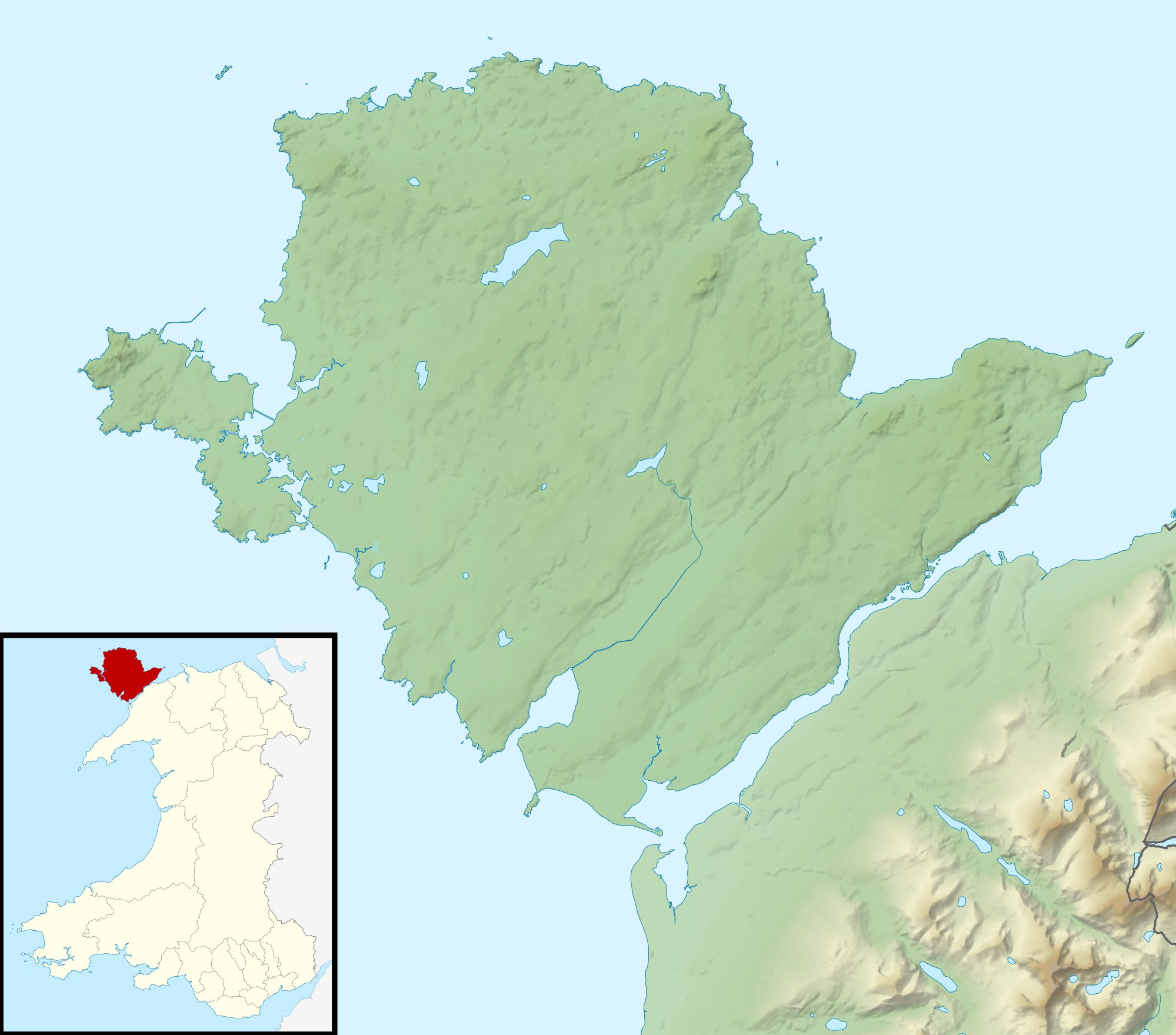
- Location within Anglesey
- Location: Cylch-y-Garn, Anglesey, North Wales, United Kingdom
- Coordinates: 53°24′34″N 4°30′39″W
- Type: Bay and brackish lagoon
- Primary inflows: Several small streams
- Primary outflows: Regulated by a weir at Bryn Aber
- Basin countries: United Kingdom
- Managing agency: National Trust; North Wales Wildlife Trust
- Designation: Site of Special Scientific Interest (1957); Anglesey Heritage Coast; Isle of Anglesey Area of Outstanding Natural Beauty; Ynys Feurig, Cemlyn Bay and The Skerries Special Protection Area; Important Bird Area

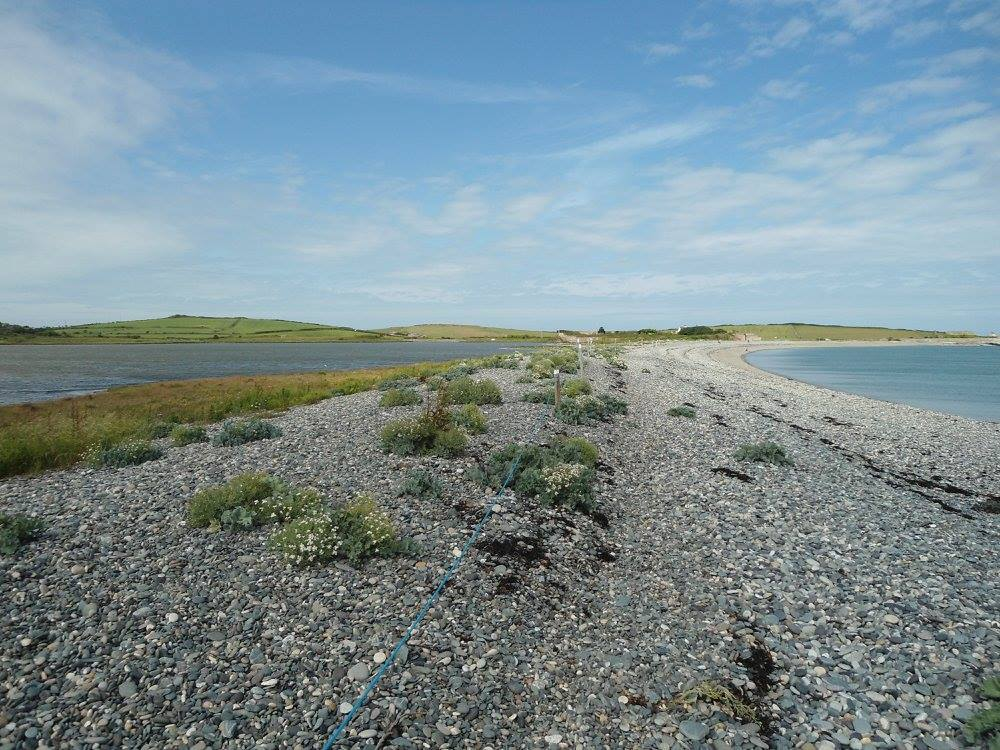
Lagoon (left) and bay (right)

Cemlyn Bay is a bay on the northwest coast of Anglesey, North Wales, approximately 2.5 km west of Wylfa nuclear power station, within the community of Cylch-y-Garn.

Separated from the bay by a shingle beach is a brackish lagoon, which is fed by a number of small streams. A weir at the western (Bryn Aber) end of the beach regulates the lagoon's water level.

The site was designated a Site of Special Scientific Interest in 1957, and is currently part of the Anglesey Heritage Coast and the Isle of Anglesey Area of Outstanding Natural Beauty. The Cemlyn estate is owned by the National Trust; the lagoon and its immediate surrounds comprise Cemlyn Nature Reserve (25.2 ha in extent, set up in 1971 and leased by the North Wales Wildlife Trust). The Anglesey Coastal Path passes through it.

== Birds ==
On islands at the western end of the lagoon, there is an important tern colony, with the only breeding Sandwich terns in Wales. The numbers of breeding Sandwich terns have increased to around 1,500 pairs in recent years, making Cemlyn the third-largest colony in the United Kingdom. Arctic and common terns breed here regularly in smaller numbers but roseate tern now only occasionally. For this reason Cemlyn has been designated as part of the Ynys Feurig, Cemlyn Bay and The Skerries Special Protection Area along with two other nearby sites, Ynys Feurig and The Skerries, and all three are also classed by BirdLife International as an Important Bird Area. Birds interchange regularly between all three sites, and form part of a larger Irish Sea tern population together with birds at sites in Ireland such as Rockabill Island. The tern colony is wardened from May to August.

Other breeding birds found at Cemlyn include black-headed gull, ringed plover, oystercatcher and shelduck. The site is locally important for wintering wildfowl, with wigeon, shoveler and teal.

Cemlyn has attracted a number of vagrant birds. It is famous among twitchers as the site where a bridled tern spent several weeks in July 1988, and where the similarly rare (in a British context) sooty tern was present on and off in July 2005. Both species had at these times been seen by only a very small number of birders in Britain. More recently, a squacco heron was present in June 2015.

== Other biological interest ==
The shingle ridge supports a maritime plant community; species present here include sea kale, sea beet, sea campion, thrift and yellow horned poppy. Around the edges of the lagoon, saltmarsh plant communities are present, with species such as sea aster, sea purslane, Danish scurvygrass and saltmarsh oraches. Grey mullet are found in the lagoon.

== Gallery ==
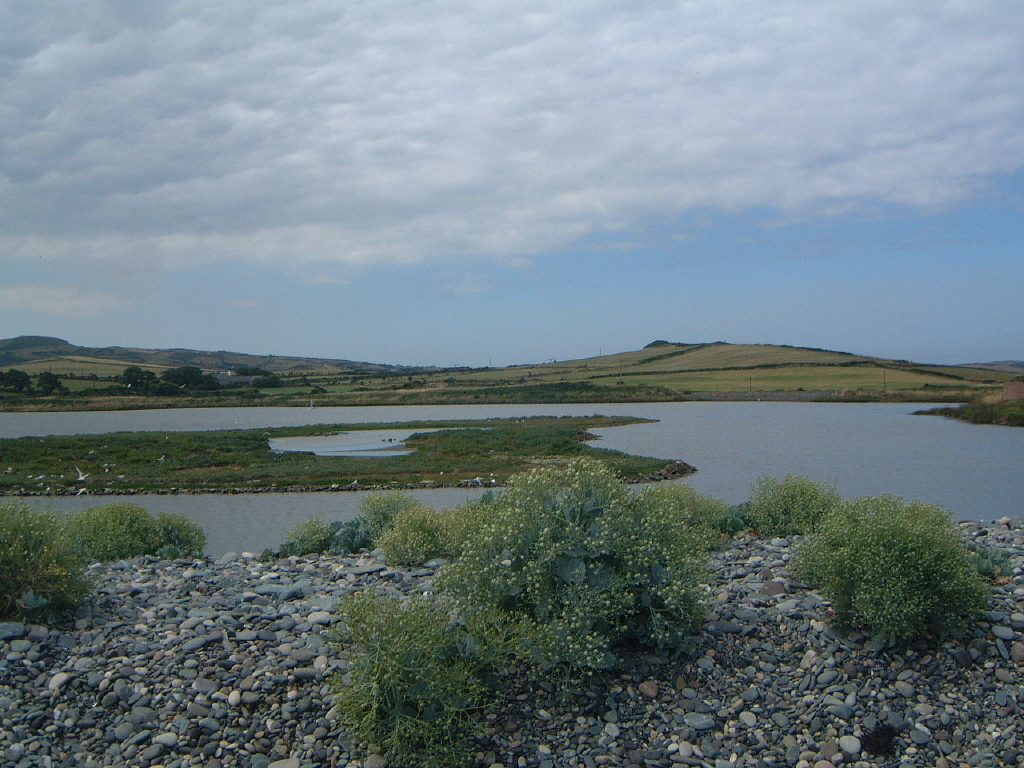
Tern colony in lagoon

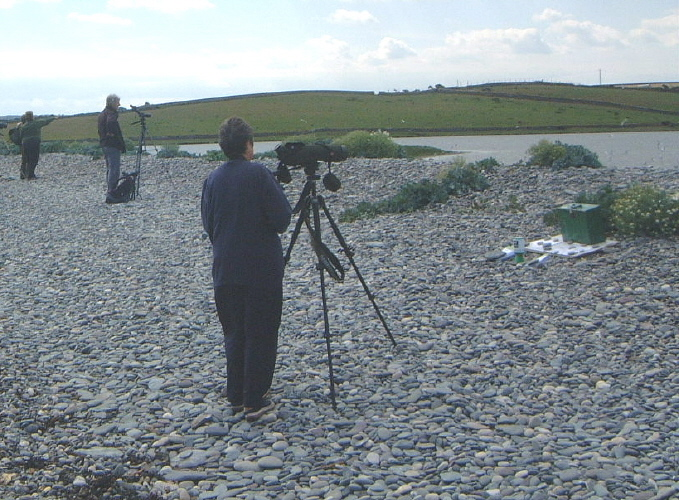
Twitcher admiring sooty tern

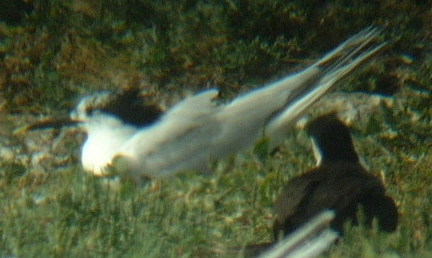
Sooty and Sandwich terns in colony

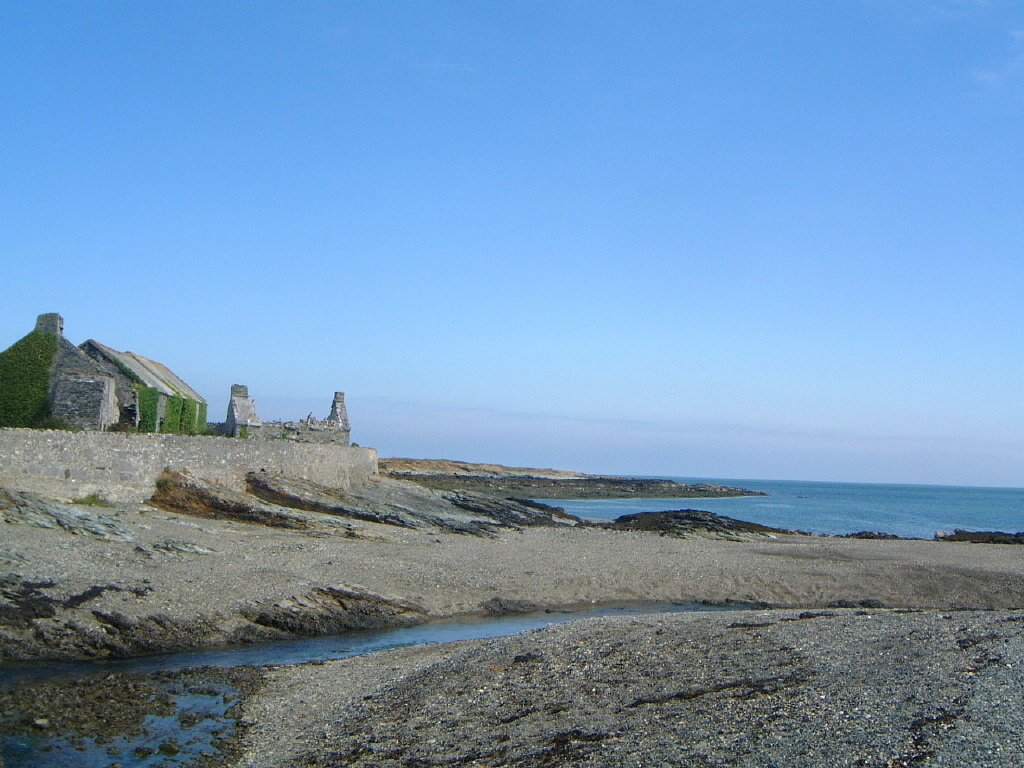
Looking west

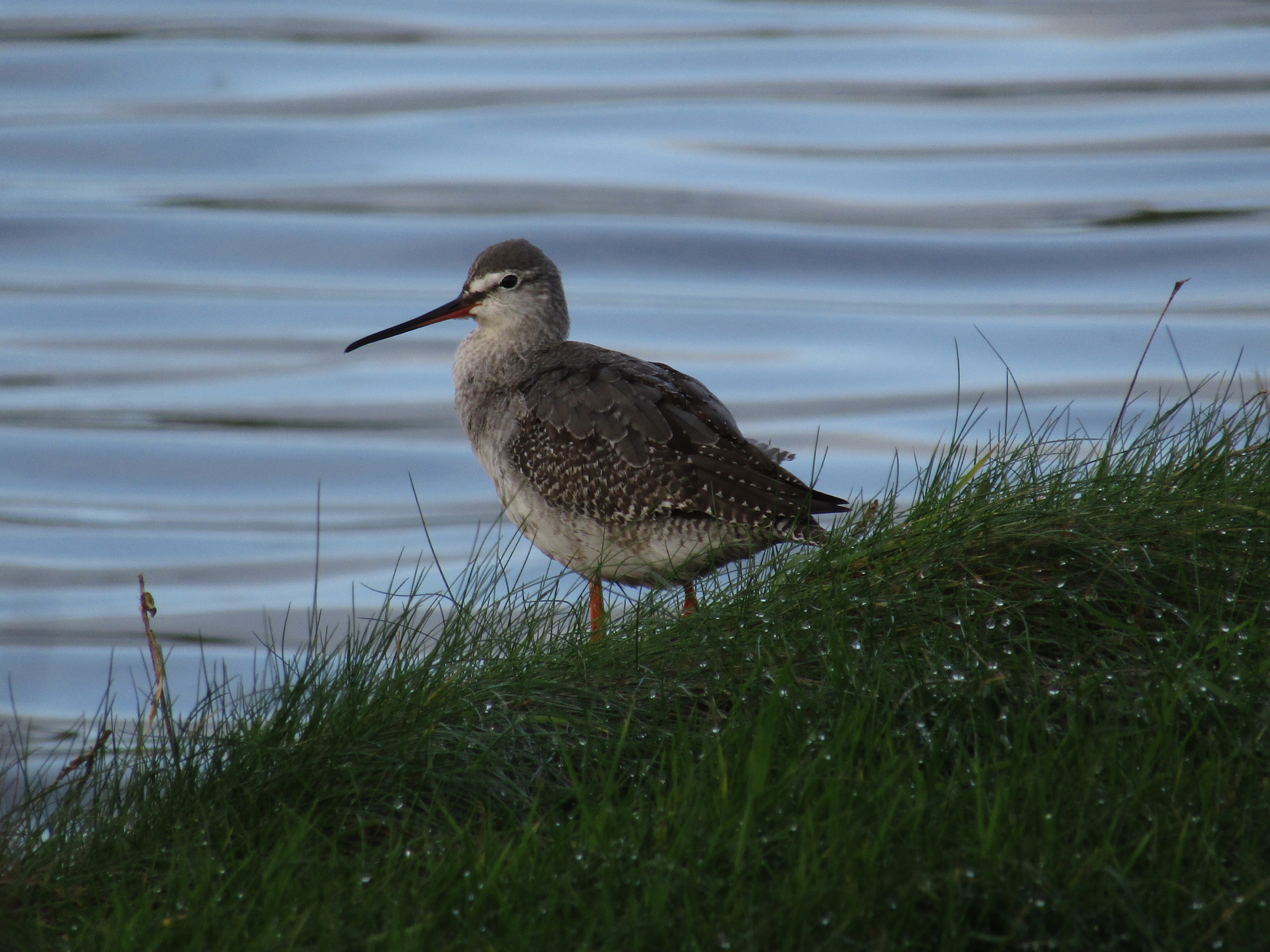
A spotted redshank on the edge of the lagoon

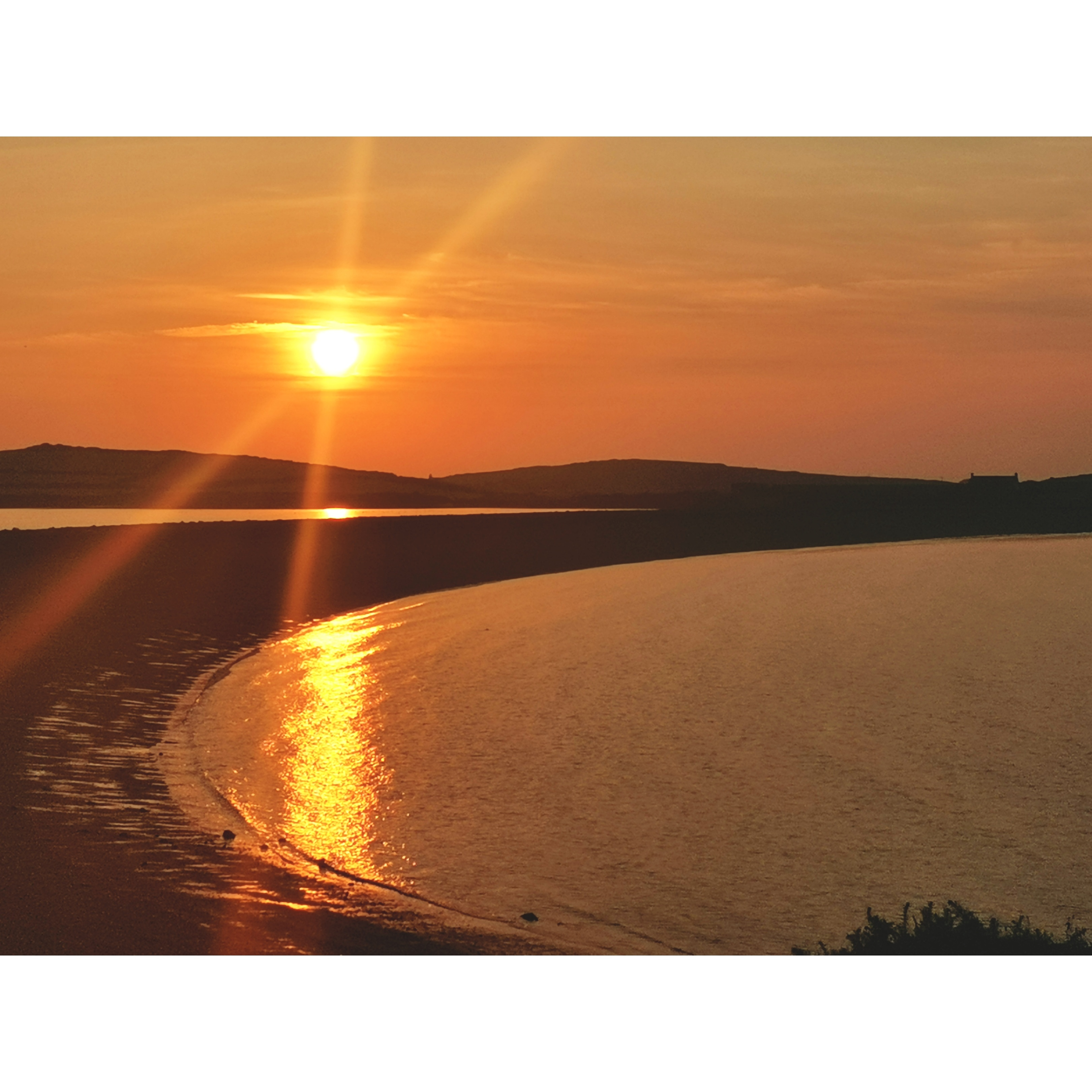
Sunset at Cemlyn Bay
