= Ynys Feurig, Cemlyn Bay and The Skerries Special Protection Area =

Protected area in Anglesey, Wales

Ynys Feurig, Cemlyn Bay and The Skerries Special Protection Area, also known as the (North) Anglesey tern colonies, is a Special Protection Area covering three sites in Anglesey, North Wales which support breeding terns:

- Ynys Feurig (53.2318°N 4.5425°W)
- Cemlyn Bay and lagoon (53.4158°N 4.5046°W)
- The Skerries (53.4225°N 4.6071°W)

All three sites have been notified as Sites of Special Scientific Interest.
