= Half Tide Rock =

Island in Australia

Coordinates: 40°35′S 144°56′E

Half Tide Rock is a small rocky island with an area of 0.13 ha, in south-eastern Australia. It is part of the Petrel Island Group, lying in Bass Strait close to Walker and Robbins Islands in north-west Tasmania.

== Fauna ==
Recorded breeding seabird, shorebird species include sooty oystercatcher and black-faced cormorant.
