= Ynys Moelfre =

Island off Anglesey, Wales

Coordinates: 53°21′29.3″N 4°13′39.2″W

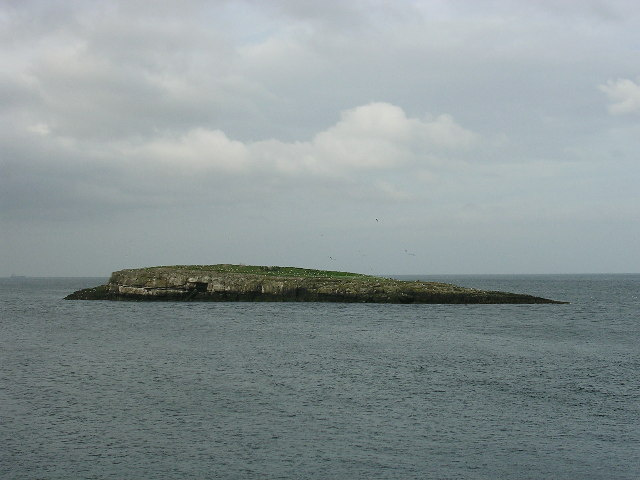
Ynys Moelfre

Map of Ynys Moelfre and the headland of Moelfre village.

Ynys Moelfre (Welsh for 'Moelfre Island') is a small island off the coast of Anglesey, Wales. At low tide it has a maximum length of 261 metres and a maximum width of 121 metres with a maximum area of 6.6 acres (27,000 m^{2}). The nearest settlement to the island is the village of Moelfre, and the two are separated by a shallow channel called Y Swnt (The Strait or The Sound), which is never more than 194 metres wide and can at low tide only be waist-deep all the way across. At extreme low Spring tides, it is possible to walk across to the island on dry ground all the way. Due to its proximity to the mainland there are grasses found on the island and a few wild flowers. Species of birds that can be found on the island include gulls, terns, gannets, fulmars, and Great/Arctic skuas. A colony of seals live there and porpoises are occasionally seen also. There are, however, no man-made structures. It is referred to by some locals as Rat Island.
