= Middle Mouse =

Island off Anglesey, Wales

Coordinates: 53°26′6.1″N 4°26′13.8″W

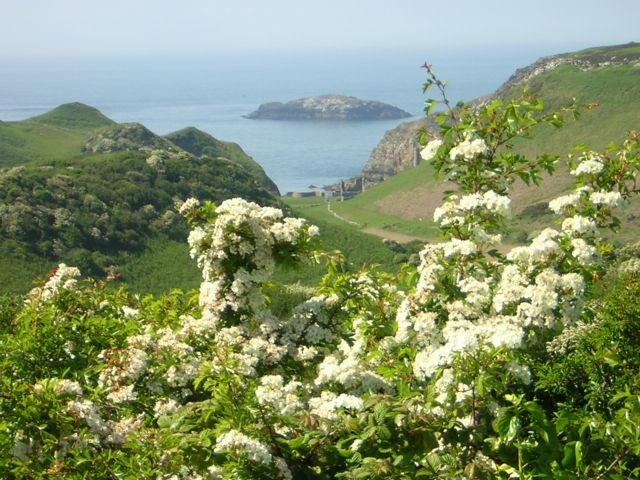
Middle Mouse as seen from the Anglesey mainland

Middle Mouse (Welsh: Ynys Badrig - Patrick's island) is an uninhabited island situated 1 kilometre (1,100 yards) off the north coast of Anglesey. It is notable as the northernmost point of Wales. The island measures a maximum of 207 by 110 metres (226 by 120 yards), with a maximum area of 3.7 acres and has a maximum altitude of 16 metres (52 ft) above sea level. It is one of a chain of three islands off the north of Anglesey, the others being Ynys Amlwch and Maen y Bugail.

Local legend has it that St Patrick was shipwrecked there, giving rise to its Welsh name. He then swam ashore and eventually founded the nearby church of Llanbadrig in about 440 AD, believed to be the oldest Christian site in Wales.

Middle Mouse is a favoured place for cormorants, guillemots and razorbills. For visiting scuba divers the attractions are steep underwater cliffs that drop away to 40 metres (130 ft) with abundant marine life. There is very little protection from the fierce tidal flow, so accurate timing for slack water is required.

During the 19th century the island was used as a navigational aid to ships sailing into Liverpool. Any vessel that passed the island without signalling, and waiting for, a pilot was liable to incur a fine. The S.S. Liverpool, following a collision with a ship named Laplata, was shipwrecked near Middle Mouse in 1863. She had on board a shipment of tin ingots.

In 2005, the island was put up for sale as part of a 168-acre (0.68 km^{2}) estate.
