= Ynys Faelog =

Island in the Menai Strait, Wales

Coordinates: 53.227°N 4.158°W

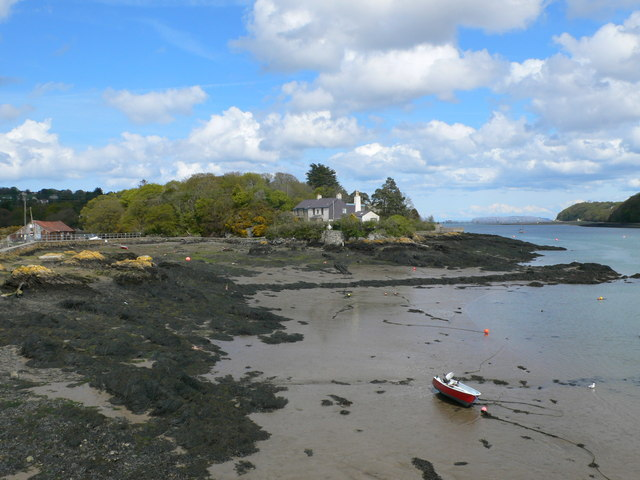
The island from Menai Bridge

Ynys Faelog is a small tidal island in the Menai Strait between Gwynedd and the Isle of Anglesey, Wales, near the town of Menai Bridge. On average it measures 140 metres by 130 metres and is connected by a narrow stone causeway to the Anglesey mainland. There is a two-storey house on the island with three outbuildings and a boathouse.
