= Ynys Lochtyn =

Tidal island near Wales

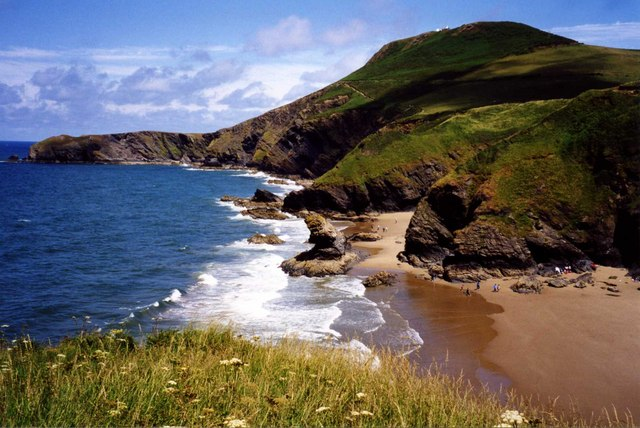
Looking northwards towards Ynys Lochtyn from Pen-rhip at Llangrannog

Ynys Lochtyn is an island found at the tip of the Lochtyn peninsula on the coast of Cardigan Bay, located 1.5 miles north east of the village of Llangrannog in the county of Ceredigion, Wales. Popular with tourists, it is accessible by the coastal path when walking towards New Quay.
