= West Mouse =

Island near Anglesey, Wales

Coordinates: 53°25′3.1″N 4°33′16.7″W

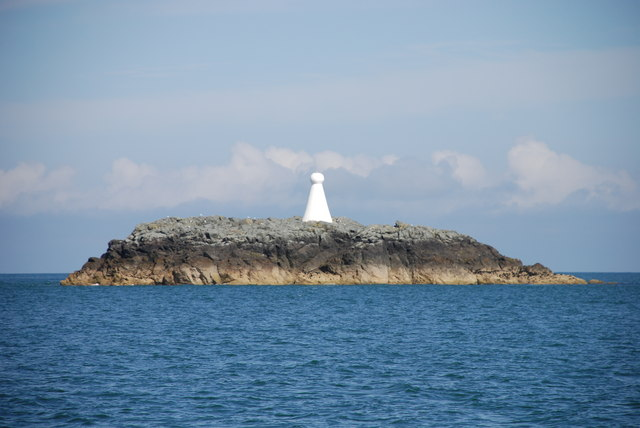
West Mouse

West Mouse (Welsh: Maen y Bugail) is an islet lying 1.1 kilometres (0.68 mi) off the north-west coast of Anglesey, Wales. Its maximum dimensions are 92 by 82 metres (302 by 269 ft), with an area of 1.2 acres (4,900 m^{2}).

It is located in an area of notoriously strong tides. Because of this, at least three shipwrecks lie near it, making it a popular diving location. There is now a white beacon on the island which is used as a navigational aid if lined up with two other beacons, one on the Anglesey mainland and another on Coal Rock, an islet a mile and a half north. The area also host to species such as hornwrack, sea squirts and conger eels. The island is part of a set of three spread out along the north coast of Anglesey. The other two islands are Ynys Amlwch and Ynys Badrig.

The Welsh name Maen y Bugail translates into English as The Shepherd's Stone. This comes from a folklore tale in which a shepherd who was looking for his sheep was annoyed by a stone in his shoe. He took the stone out and threw it into the Irish Sea, the island arising at the place in which it landed.
