= East Mouse =

Islet in Anglesey, Wales, United Kingdom

Coordinates: 53°25′19″N 4°20′28.1″W

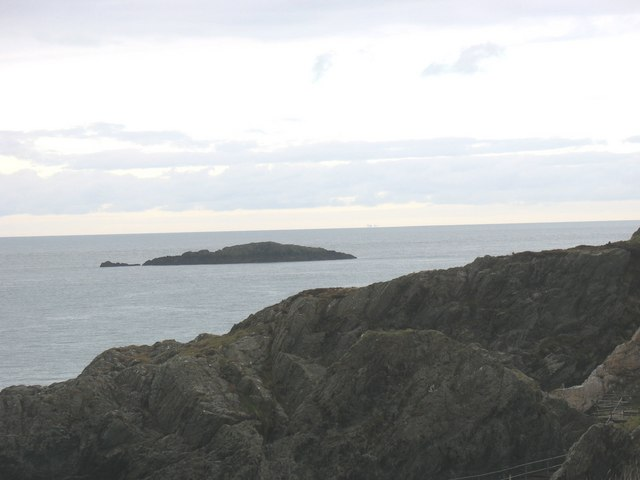
East Mouse from the cliff top near Garreg Fawr

The island off Anglesey

East Mouse (Welsh: Ynys Amlwch) is an islet found off the north coast of Anglesey, Wales. It is found just a few hundred metres away from the town of Amlwch. For this reason the island is known in Welsh as Ynys Amlwch, Amlwch Island. The islet is tiny (a maximum 141 metres long by 61 metres wide) with a maximum area of only 1.5 acres (6,100 m^{2}), and void of any significant flora and fauna. The islet is one of three similarly named islands off the north coast of Anglesey, the other two being West Mouse (Maen y Bugail) and Middle Mouse (Ynys Badrig). The island is the site of the wreck of the SS Dakota, which was built in 1874, striking the island and sinking on 9 May 1877. The 4,332-ton ship was broken into three pieces but all 218 souls on board were saved.
