= Ynys Gaint =

Island in the Menai Strait, Wales

Coordinates: 53°13′48.1″N 4°9′21″W

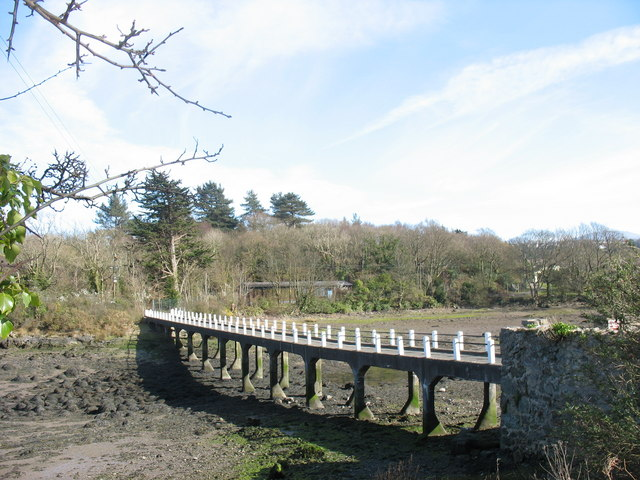
The main causeway to Ynys Gaint

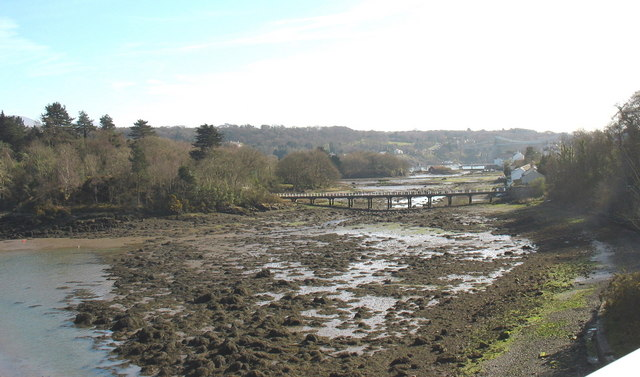
another view of The main causeway

Ynys Gaint is a small island in the Menai Strait connected to the town of Menai Bridge on Anglesey by a causeway (which still exists today) and also a concrete bridge erected by Sir William Fison (a previous owner of the island) in the 1930s. Literally translated Ynys Gaint means Kent Island.

Ynys Gaint lies close to the Anglesey shore at OS reference SH561725, between Ynys Faelog and Ynys Castell. Between 1942 and 1944 the island housed a Royal Air Force air-sea rescue unit, with several high speed launches, and a small part of the island is still occupied by the MOD, housing a Royal Naval Auxiliary Service (RNXS) unit until 1994. A quasi-military presence remains on the island in the form of an Army Cadet unit and the Maritime Volunteer Service. There are also two privately owned residential properties on Ynys Gaint. One of these had a portion of its garden designed by Sir Clough Williams-Ellis, of Portmeirion fame.
