= List of islands of the Isle of Man =

This is a list of islands of the Isle of Man. The Isle of Man is a Crown dependency in the centre of the Irish Sea. It is not a part of the United Kingdom, but it is a territory under sovereignty of the United Kingdom.

Several islands in the Irish Sea are part of Crown dependency of the Isle of Man. Only two of the islands are populated, while two islands are joined to the Isle of Man by causeways.

== Islands of the Isle of Man ==
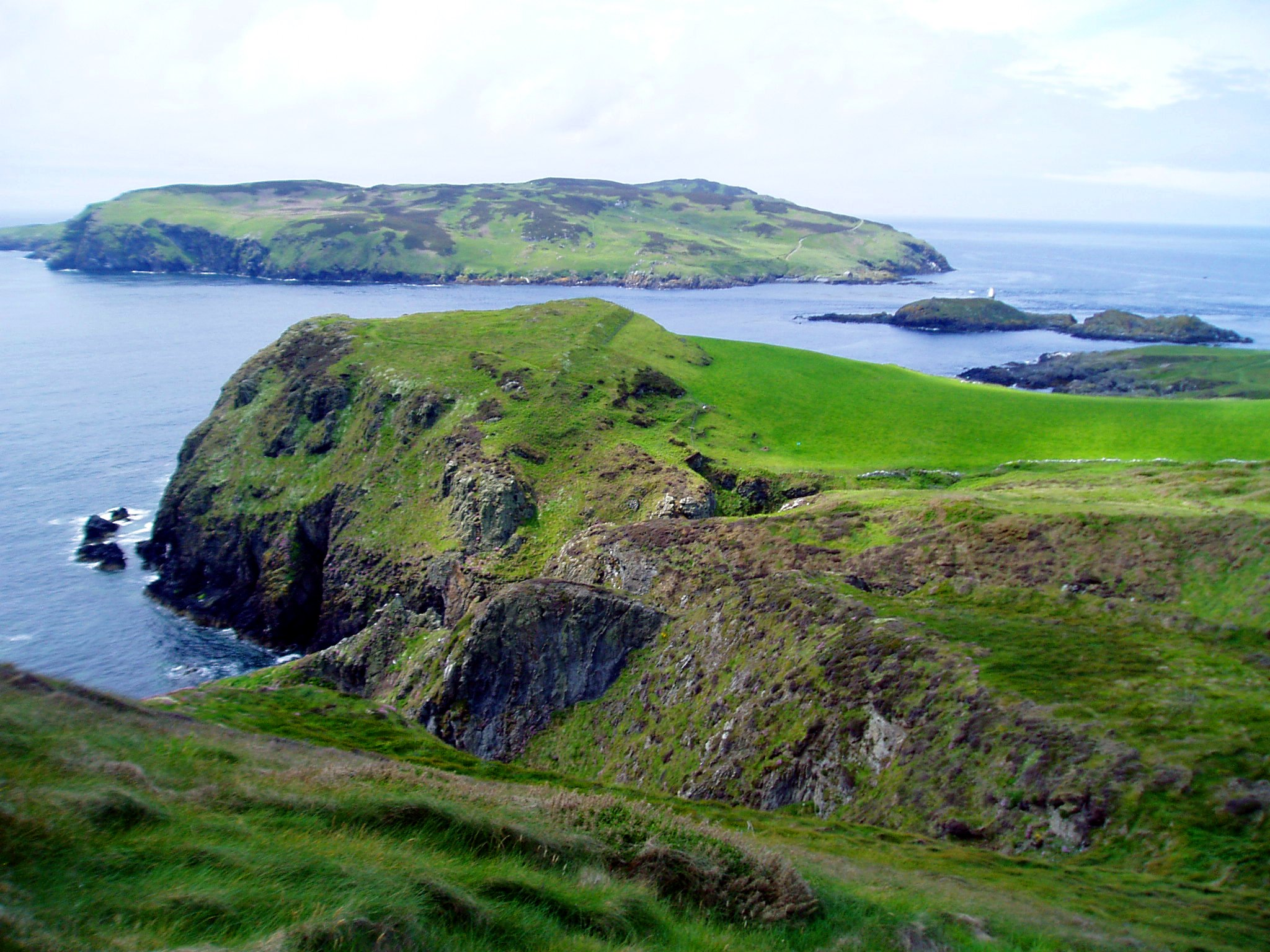
The Calf of Man

- Isle of Man (Ellan Vannin) population 80,056 (2006 Census)
- Calf of Man (Yn Cholloo) population 2 (2006 Census)
- St Michael's Isle, or Fort Island (Ellan Noo Mael or Ynnys Vaayl) (connected to the mainland by a causeway)
- St Patrick's Isle (Ellan Noo Perick) (connected to the mainland by a causeway)

Islets

- Kitterland (Famman Kitterland)
- St Mary's Isle, or Conister Rock (Kione y Sker or Creg Voirrey)
- Chicken Rock (or Chicken's Rock) (Carrick ny Kirkey)

Former island in prehistoric times

- Langness Peninsula (population c. 30)
