= Ynys Benlas =

Islet in Cymyran Strait, Anglesey, Wales

Coordinates: 53°17′9″N 4°35′46.5″W

Ynys Benlas shown within the United Kingdom
(grid reference SH270796)

Ynys Benlas is a small islet situated in the Inland Sea (Welsh: Y Lasinwen), part of the Cymyran Strait between Anglesey and Holy Island. It measures approximately 65 metres (east-west) by 35 metres (north-south) at low tide and covers about 0.2 hectares.

Its name translates from the Welsh for "blue top island", which is thought to derive from the fact that bluebells apparently flourished on it. Late nineteenth century Ordnance survey maps refer to the islet as Ynys Henlas, which translates as "old blue island"

According to the Archaeological Journal (1844), the islet (referred to as Ben Las in the Journal) may have been an ancient signal hill.
