= Ynys Castell =

Island near Anglesey, Wales

Coordinates: 53°13′55″N 4°9′8.4″W

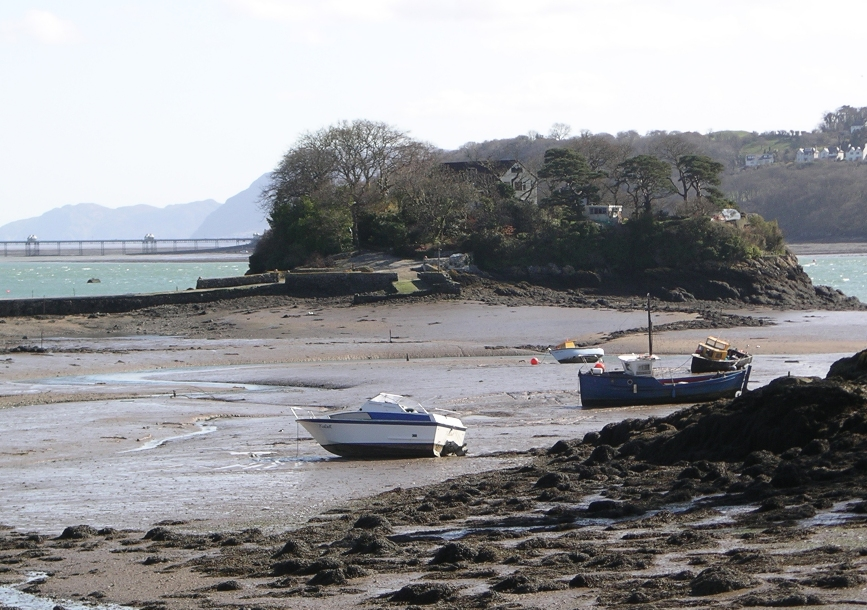
Ynys Castell from the Beaumaris road

Ynys Castell (grid reference SH564727) is a small (1.6 acres at high tide) island in the Menai Strait which separates Anglesey and mainland Wales. It is an extruding piece of Precambrian schist lying to one side of the Afon Cadnant estuary. It lies between Ynys y Bîg and Ynys Gaint. There is a causeway running to the island that is covered at high tide. On the island there is a private house. Ynys Castell means Castle Island in Welsh.
