= Ynys y Bîg =

Island near Anglesey, Wales

Coordinates: 53°14′0.7″N 4°9′3.5″W

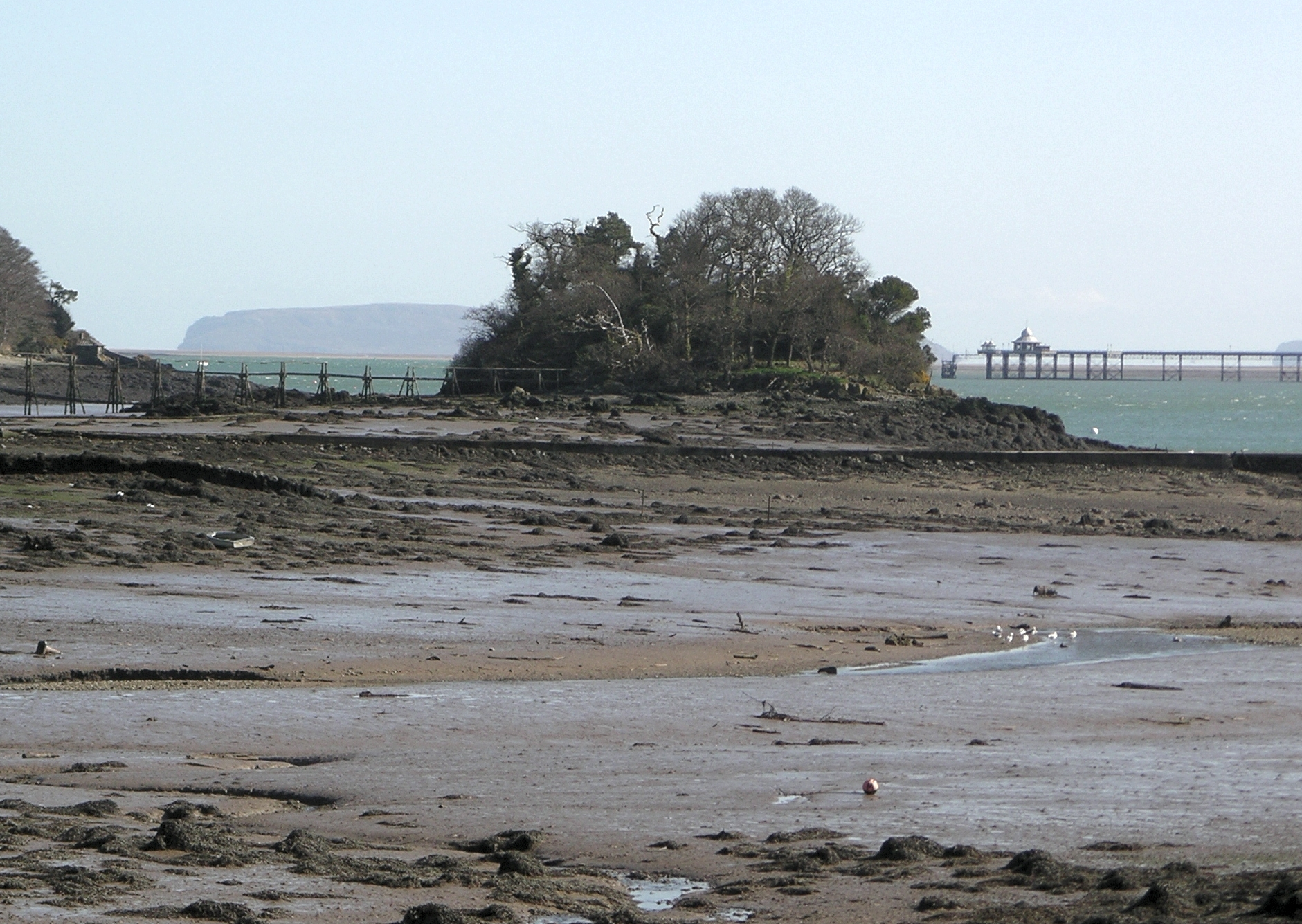
Ynys y Bîg from the Beaumaris road

Ynys y Bîg is a small private island in the Menai Strait attached to the island of Anglesey, in North Wales, by a wooden bridge. The bridge runs from the grounds of a private house, itself also called Ynys y Bîg, preventing any public access.

== Location ==
The island lies about 1 mile north-east of the Menai Suspension Bridge and is part of the Glannau Porthaethwy Site of Special Scientific Interest and in an Area of Outstanding Natural Beauty. At mean low tide there is no water separating it from the mainland, whilst at high tide it is separate with an area of 0.7 acres. It is heavily wooded and in some years herons nest there in some numbers. Ynys y Bîg has a fish trap listed by the Royal Commission on the Ancient and Historical Monuments of Wales as part of the island.

== History ==
Historically, Ynys y Bîg was a part of Thomas Williams of Llanidan's estate before it was broken up following his death with Ynys y Bîg being separated. The bridge fell into disrepair and collapsed but it was reconstructed to reconnect the island in 2019.

There had been numerous applications to demolish the house on the island. Requests were made in 2019 and 2021, with the Isle of Anglesey County Council refusing planning permission on both occasions. A new application was made to demolish and rebuild the house in 2024. This was made by the owners on the grounds the house was energy inefficient and was "dated". The planning permission was granted by the council in October 2024.
