= Ynys Gored Goch =

Island in Menai Strait, Wales

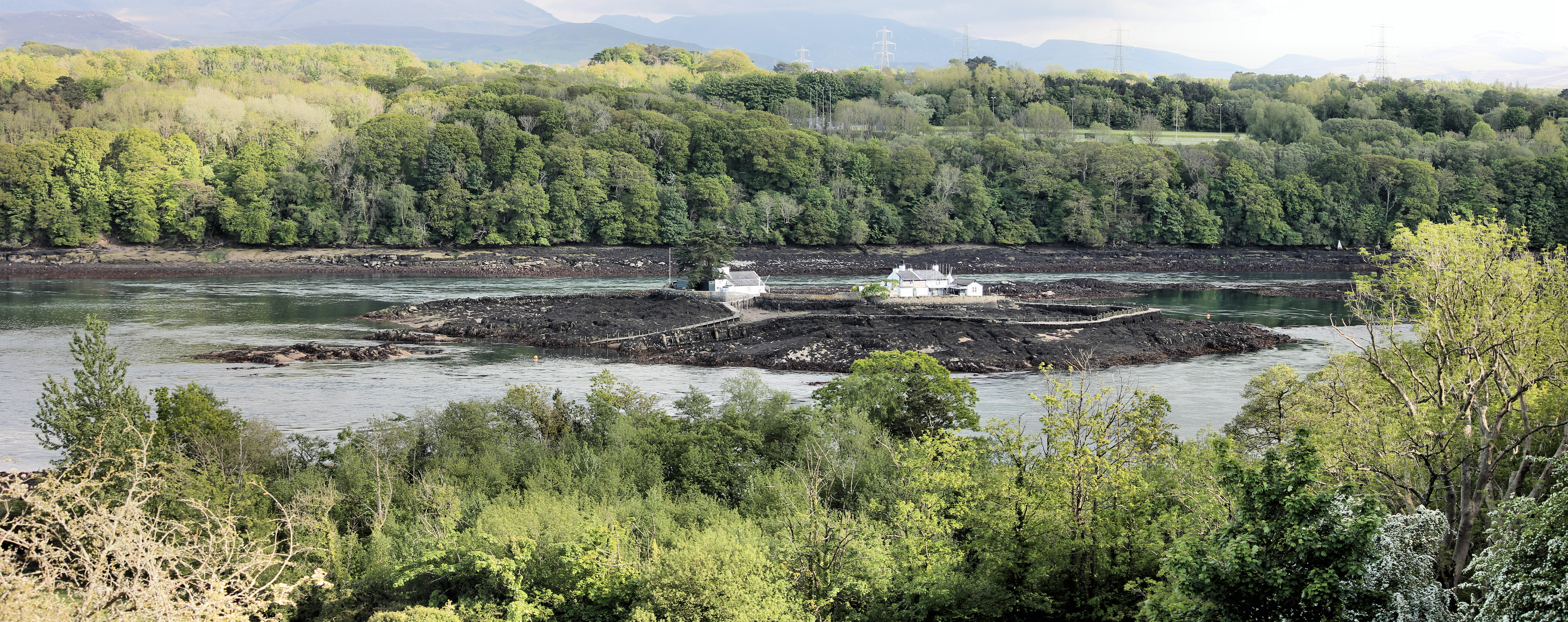
- Ynys Gored Goch lies in the Swellies; May 2021
- Interactive map of Ynys Gored Goch

Geography
- Coordinates: 53°13′6.8″N 4°10′51.4″W
- Area: 0.0018 sq mi (0.0047 km^{2})
- Length: 0.06 mi (0.1 km)
- Width: 0.03 mi (0.05 km)
- Coastline: 0.18 mi (0.29 km)
- Highest elevation: 30 ft (9 m)

Administration
- Wales
- County: Anglesey

Ynys Gored Goch (Welsh for 'red weir island'), sometimes Ynys Gorad Goch, is a small island in the Menai Strait between Gwynedd and Anglesey in North Wales. It is situated in the stretch of the strait called the Swellies between Thomas Telford's Menai Suspension Bridge and Robert Stephenson's Britannia Bridge.

The island is occupied by the main house and the converted smoke house where locally caught fish were processed. The island is private property and access is only by boat.

== History ==
The earliest known document relating to the island dates from 1590 when it is listed as belonging to the Diocese of Bangor which leased it for £3 and a barrel of herrings a year as the island was used as a fishing trap and presently has the remains of two fishing weirs. The weirs are thought to have been constructed at the same time as the smoking chamber was built, around 1842, in the path of eddy currents that would take the fish into the weirs and leave them trapped as the tide retreated.

After 1888 when the house was sold into private hands the whitebait (herring), business was developed, and growing tourism in the 20th century meant people would often travel to the island to taste the fish. A bell by the Anglesey shore summoned a boat to carry visitors across to enjoy a 'Gored Whitebait Tea' which comprised a pot of tea, brown bread and butter and whitebait ‘fried in a basket’, priced one shilling.

== Location ==
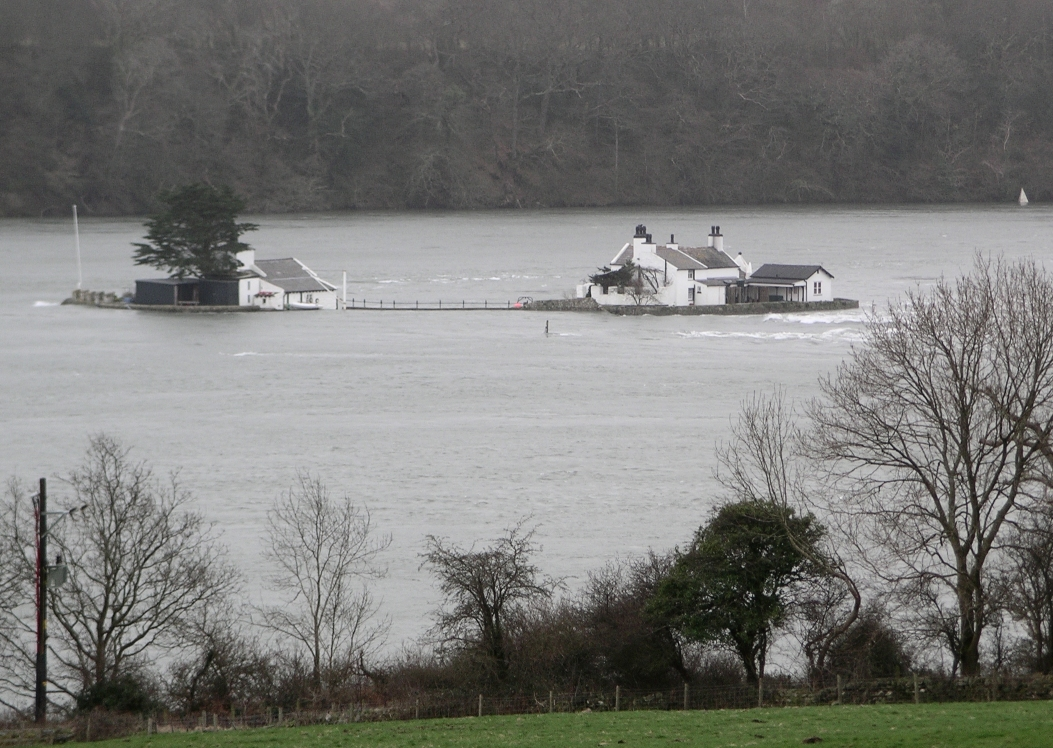
A 10.4 metres (34 ft) high spring tide around Ynys Gored Goch, 30 March 2006.

The strong tidal flow in the Menai Strait creates small whirlpools, hence the name the "Swillies". In olden times, access by rowing boat was restricted by the tides but nowadays modern boats can access anytime. Mains water and electricity were installed in 1997. Pumping systems mean the two houses no longer flood. Due to the large tidal range of the Menai Strait the size of the island varies between 0.5 acres (0.2 ha) and 3.7 acres (1.5 ha).

The tidal range of the Menai Strait is known to exceed 10 metres (33 ft) during high with spring tides which makes it appear that the buildings are on two separate islands. Occasional storm surges have even increased water levels up to 11.2 metres (37 ft).

Ynys Gored Goch once had a large common tern colony. This has now reduced to approximately 10 pairs which in 2011 produced 13 chicks.

The island's location makes it a popular theme in photographs of the Menai Strait and its bridges. It has also featured in television programmes such as A Great Welsh Adventure with Griff Rhys Jones (2014), Countryfile (2016) and Robson Green's Coastal Lives (2017).
