= Ynys Feurig =

Set of three islets near Anglesey, Wales

Coordinates: 53.23141°N 4.54091°W

Ynys Feurig (also spelt Ynys Feirig) is the name for a set of three small inter-connected low-lying inshore tidal rocky islets (3.1 ha in extent), lying off from the west coast of Anglesey, North Wales, just north of the village of Rhosneigr and south of RAF Valley airfield. They are also known by the English name Starvation Island. The islets are accessible from the mainland at mid-to low tide. The clipper Norman Court ran aground nearby, in Cymyran Bay.

== Seabirds ==
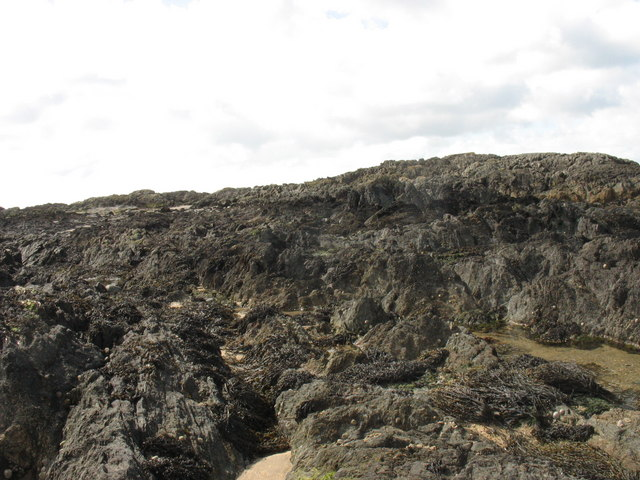
The barren surface of the island in 2008

The islands are important for their tern colony, in particular for roseate tern, for which this is the most regular breeding site on Anglesey, although numbers of breeding pairs are low currently (2005) compared with the past. Because of this the island has been designated as part of the Ynys Feurig, Cemlyn Bay and The Skerries Special Protection Area along with two other nearby sites, Cemlyn Bay and The Skerries, and all three are also classed by BirdLife International as an Important Bird Area.

Ynys Feurig is also a Site of Special Scientific Interest. Birds interchange regularly between all three sites, and form part of a larger Irish Sea tern population together with birds at sites in Ireland such as Rockabill Island. The major threat to the terns here is predation by rats; in 1978 rats killed 17 adult terns including 14 roseate terns, as well as taking all the eggs and young of that year. The RSPB warden the site to protect the terns; management measures they have undertaken here to help increase the roseate tern population include small-scale control of vegetation and provision of nestboxes, although it is thought that the number of breeding pairs at this site is primarily dependent on the overall health of the Irish Sea population.

The site first came to national attention among birders in July 2005 when a sooty tern paid a very brief visit, before relocating to The Skerries and Cemlyn.
