= Onega =

Onega may refer to:

== Places ==
=== Russia ===
- Onega (river), in Arkhangelsk Oblast
- Onega, Russia, a town in Arkhangelsk Oblast
- Onega Bay (Onega Gulf)
- Onega Peninsula
- Lake Onega

=== United States ===
- Onega, Minnesota, United States
- Onega, Texas (now called Aubrey), United States

== People ==
- Ermindo Onega (1940–1979), Argentine footballer
- Daniel Onega (born 1945), Argentine footballer

== Ships ==
- SS Onega (1927), a Russian factory ship in service 1945-69

== Other ==
- Onega stepanovi, an Ediacaran fossil genus renamed Cephalonega in 2019
- Onega (leafhopper), a genus of leafhoppers
- Onega rocket, a proposed further upgrade version of the Soyuz-2 launch vehicle

== See also ==
- Onezhsky (disambiguation)
- Omega (disambiguation)
