= Porog =

Porog (Russian: Порог) is the name of several rural localities in Russia:

- Porog, Arkhangelsk Oblast, a selo in Kokorinsky Selsoviet of Onezhsky District of Arkhangelsk Oblast
- Porog, Irkutsk Oblast, a selo in Nizhneudinsky District of Irkutsk Oblast
- Porog, Krasnoyarsk Krai, a village in Pyatkovsky Selsoviet of Kazachinsky District of Krasnoyarsk Krai
- Porog, Boksitogorsky District, Leningrad Oblast, a village in Bolshedvorskoye Settlement Municipal Formation of Boksitogorsky District of Leningrad Oblast
- Porog, Kirishsky District, Leningrad Oblast, a village in Pchevzhinskoye Settlement Municipal Formation of Kirishsky District of Leningrad Oblast
- Porog, Volkhovsky District, Leningrad Oblast, a village in Khvalovskoye Settlement Municipal Formation of Volkhovsky District of Leningrad Oblast
- Porog, Novgorod Oblast, a village under the administrative jurisdiction of the urban-type settlement of Nebolchi, Lyubytinsky District, Novgorod Oblast
- Porog, Kaduysky District, Vologda Oblast, a village in Baranovsky Selsoviet of Kaduysky District of Vologda Oblast
- Porog, Velikoustyugsky District, Vologda Oblast, a village in Opoksky Selsoviet of Velikoustyugsky District of Vologda Oblast
- Porog, Vytegorsky District, Vologda Oblast, a village in Andomsky Selsoviet of Vytegorsky District of Vologda Oblast
