= Skerry (disambiguation) =

A skerry is a small rocky island, usually defined to be too small for habitation.

Skerry, skerries, or The Skerries may also refer to:

== Geography ==
=== Northern Ireland ===
- Skerries, County Armagh, a townland in County Armagh
- Skerry, County Antrim, a parish in County Antrim
- The Skerries, Northern Ireland

=== Republic of Ireland ===
- Skerries, County Dublin, a seaside town in Fingal, County Dublin
  - Skerries railway station
- Skerries, County Kildare, a townland in County Kildare

=== Russia ===
- Minina Skerries
- The area surrounding Taymyr Island
- Sumsky Skerries

=== Scotland ===
- Sule Skerry
- Skerryvore
- A number of locations in the Orkney Islands
  - Auskerry
  - Pentland Skerries
- A number of locations in the Shetland Islands
  - Out Skerries
  - Gaut Skerries, in the Ramna Stacks
  - Ve Skerries

=== South Georgia ===
- Skrap Skerries

=== United States ===
- Skerry, New York

=== Wales ===
- The Skerries, Isle of Anglesey

=== Australia ===
- The Skerries (Victoria)

== Literature and music ==
- Skerry, a fictional mammal in Neal Stephenson's novel Cryptonomicon
- "Skerries", isolated parts of The Dreaming (comics) in The Sandman
- ""From the Outermost Skerries", fourth symphony in C minor, Op. 39, by Hugo Alfvén

== Other uses ==
- Battle of Skerries, a 1316 battle in Skerries, County Kildare
- Skerries RFC, a rugby team based in Skerries, Dublin
- Skerry cruiser, aka square metre yachts, a type of sailing vessel
- Storm Over the Skerries, a 1938 Swedish film directed by Ivar Johansson
