= Onezhsky =

Onezhsky (masculine), Onezhskaya (feminine), or Onezhskoye (neuter) may refer to:

- Onezhsky District, a district of Arkhangelsk Oblast, Russia
- Onezhskoye Urban Settlement, a municipal formation within Onezhsky Municipal District which the town of oblast significance of Onega in Arkhangelsk Oblast, Russia is incorporated as
- Onezhsky (rural locality), a rural locality (a settlement) in the Republic of Karelia, Russia
- Onega Peninsula (Onezhsky poluostrov), a peninsula in Arkhangelsk Oblast, Russia
- Lake Onega (Onezhskoye ozero), a lake in the northwest of Russia
- Onega Bay (Onezhsky zaliv or Onezhskaya guba), a bay in the northwest of Russia
