= Abramovsky =

Abramovsky (Russian: Абрамовский; masculine), Abramovskaya (Абрамовская; feminine), or Abramovskoye (Абрамовское; neuter) is the name of several rural localities in Russia:

- Abramovsky, Arkhangelsk Oblast, a lighthouse in Dolgoshchelsky Selsoviet of Mezensky District of Arkhangelsk Oblast
- Abramovsky, Kursk Oblast, a khutor in Kolychevsky Selsoviet of Fatezhsky District of Kursk Oblast
- Abramovskoye, Kaluga Oblast, a village in Borovsky District of Kaluga Oblast
- Abramovskoye, Sverdlovsk Oblast, a selo in Sysertsky District of Sverdlovsk Oblast
- Abramovskoye, Vologda Oblast, a village in Zadneselsky Selsoviet of Ust-Kubinsky District of Vologda Oblast
- Abramovskaya, Onezhsky District, Arkhangelsk Oblast, a village under the administrative jurisdiction of Maloshuyka Urban-Type Settlement with Jurisdictional Territory in Onezhsky District of Arkhangelsk Oblast
- Abramovskaya, Shenkursky District, Arkhangelsk Oblast, a village in Shegovarsky Selsoviet of Shenkursky District of Arkhangelsk Oblast
