= Nimenga =

- Settlement
- Location within Arkhangelsk Oblast Location within Russia
- Coordinates: 63°41′N 37°37′E
- Country: Russia
- Region: Arkhangelsk Oblast
- District: Onezhsky District
- Time zone: UTC+3:00
- Postal code: 164895

Nimenga (Russian: Нименьга) is a rural locality (a settlement) and the administrative center of Nimengskoye Rural Settlement of Onezhsky District, Arkhangelsk Oblast, Russia. The population was 595 as of 2010. There are 11 streets.

== Geography ==
Nimenga is located on the Nimenga River, 30 km southwest of Onega (the district's administrative centre) (979 km by road). Maloshuyka is the nearest rural locality.
