= Priluky, Onezhsky District, Arkhangelsk Oblast =

Priluky Прилуки
- Village
- Location within Arkhangelsk Oblast Location within Russia
- Coordinates: 63°13′N 39°08′E
- Country: Russia
- Region: Arkhangelsk Oblast
- District: Onezhsky District
- Time zone: UTC+3:00

Priluky (Russian: Прилуки) is a rural locality (a village) in Chekuyevskoye Rural Settlement of Onezhsky District, Arkhangelsk Oblast, Russia. The population was 103 as of 2010. There are 5 streets.

== Geography ==
Priluky is located on the left bank of the Onega River, 141 km southeast of Onega (the district's administrative centre) by road. Zalesye is the nearest rural locality.
