= Tamitsa =

Tamitsa Тамица
- Selo
- Location within Arkhangelsk Oblast Location within Russia
- Coordinates: 64°09′N 38°02′E
- Country: Russia
- Region: Arkhangelsk Oblast
- District: Onezhsky District
- Time zone: UTC+3:00

Tamitsa (Russian: Тамица) is a rural locality (a selo) in Pokrovskoye Rural Settlement of Onezhsky District, Arkhangelsk Oblast, Russia. The population was 245 as of 2010. There are 2 streets.

== Geography ==
Tamitsa is located on the Tamitsa River, 36 km north of Onega (the district's administrative centre) by road. Kyanda is the nearest rural locality.
