= Bolshaya Kyama =

Bolshaya Kyama Большая Кяма
- Settlement
- Location within Arkhangelsk Oblast Location within Russia
- Coordinates: 63°36′N 39°58′E
- Country: Russia
- Region: Arkhangelsk Oblast
- District: Plesetsky District
- Time zone: UTC+3:00 (MSK)

Bolshaya Kyama (Russian: Большая Кяма) is a rural locality (a settlement) in Obozerskoye Urban Settlement of Plesetsky District, Arkhangelsk Oblast, Russia. The population was 3 as of 2010.

== Etymology ==
The settlement takes its name from the Bolshaya Kyama River, which has its source near the railway station. The name Kyama derives from the Karelian word kem or kyam, meaning "big water". The prefix Bolshaya (meaning "big" or "greater" in Russian) distinguishes it from the nearby Malaya Kyama ("little Kyama") stream; together these watercourses form the Kyama River, a tributary of the Vaymuga.

== Geography ==
Bolshaya Kyama is located in the northern part of Plesetsky District, 142 km north of Plesetsk (the district's administrative centre) by road. The settlement lies approximately 155 km from Arkhangelsk by rail. Pervomaysky is the nearest rural locality, situated about 3 km to the south.

The settlement is situated near the source of the Bolshaya Kyama River, which flows into the Kyama River, itself a tributary of the Vaymuga. The Vaymuga is a left tributary of the Yemtsa River, which in turn flows into the Northern Dvina, placing Bolshaya Kyama within the Northern Dvina basin. The area lies within the taiga zone of the European Russian north, characterized by boreal forest dominated by coniferous trees. The region experiences a subarctic climate (Köppen Dfc) with long, cold winters and short, cool summers.

== History ==
The area of modern-day Plesetsky District was originally inhabited by speakers of Uralic languages before being colonized by the Novgorod Republic. Bolshaya Kyama developed as a station settlement (Russian: пристанционный посёлок) along the railway line connecting Obozerskaya with Belomorsk. Regular train service on the section between Obozerskaya, Bolshaya Kyama, and Kodino opened in 1939.

== Transport ==
Bolshaya Kyama is served by a station on the Northern Railway, located on the line between Belomorsk and Obozerskaya. This line connects the Moscow–Arkhangelsk main line at Obozerskaya with the railway running between Petrozavodsk and Murmansk at Belomorsk.
