= Kushereka =

Kushereka Кушерека
- Village
- Location within Arkhangelsk Oblast Location within Russia
- Coordinates: 63°48′N 37°10′E
- Country: Russia
- Region: Arkhangelsk Oblast
- District: Onezhsky District
- Time zone: UTC+3:00

Kushereka (Russian: Кушерека) is a rural locality (a village) in Maloshuyskoye Urban Settlement of Onezhsky District, Arkhangelsk Oblast, Russia. The population was 7 as of 2010. There are 2 streets.

== Geography ==
Kushereka is located 947 km west of Onega (the district's administrative centre) by road. Abramovskaya is the nearest rural locality.
