= Onezhskoye Pomorye National Park =

National park of Russia

- IUCN category II (national park)
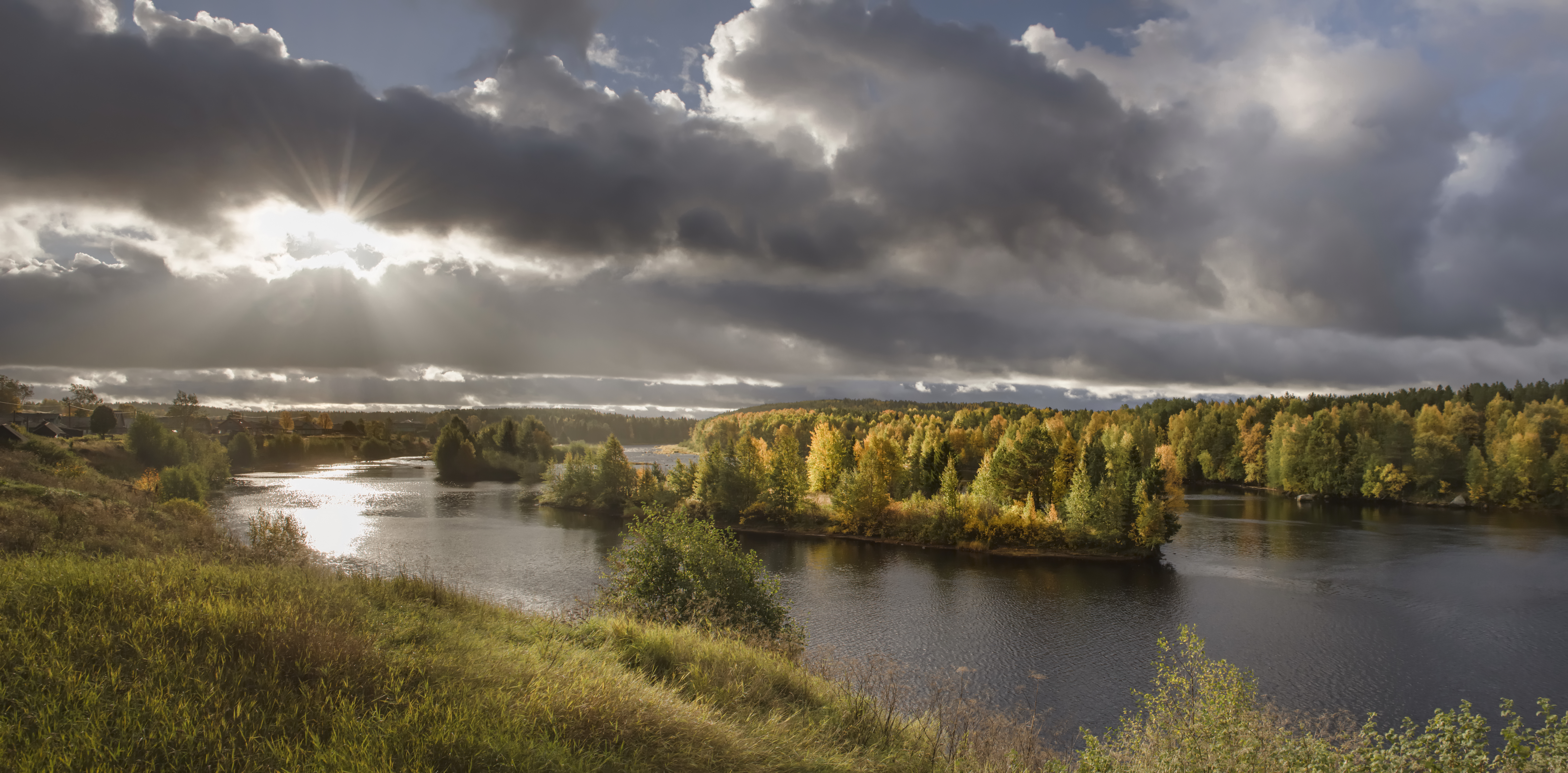

- Location within Russia
- Location: Russia
- Nearest city: Onega, Severodvinsk
- Coordinates: 64°47′N 37°18′E
- Area: 2,016.68 square kilometres (778.64 mi^{2})
- Established: 2013
- Website: https://onpomorie.ru/

Onezhskoye Pomorye National Park (Russian: Национальный парк Онежское Поморье) is a national park in the north of Russia, located on Onega Peninsula in Onezhsky and Primorsky Districts of Arkhangelsk Oblast. It was established on 26 February 2013. The park protects pristine forests and coastal landscapes. The area of the park is 2,016.68 square kilometres (778.64 mi^{2}), of which 1,806.68 square kilometres (697.56 mi^{2}) are designated as forest fund lands and 210 square kilometres (81 mi^{2}) as water fund lands.

== History ==
A creation of the national park started in 1997, however, it took until 2002 to approve the boundaries. In 2013, the land was reserved for the future national park. On 22 December 2011 the Government of Russian Federation made a decision to create a national park on the Onega Peninsula, and the park was created on 26 February 2013.

== Geography ==
The park occupies much of the Onega Peninsula and adjacent parts of the White Sea. There are no all-season means of land transportation to the mainland. Most of the area is covered by forest. Moose, eurasian brown bear, gray wolf, and red fox are common in the park. Beluga whale occurs in the White sea. In the winter, the sea is frozen.

== Goal ==
To preserve:

- the largest expanse of untouched old-growth taiga forests in Europe, extending to the marine coastline,
- the distinctive cultural heritage, including historic Pomor settlements, wooden churches from the 17th–19th centuries, and the Chesmensky and Orlovsky lighthouses of the 19th century.

== Tourism ==
Park can be visited only with a permit which needs to be obtained in advance. The maximum duration of stay is ten days, with the exception of residents of the surrounding areas, who may stay in the park up to one year.
