= Kozheozersky Monastery =

Coordinates: 63°09′24″N 38°04′58″E

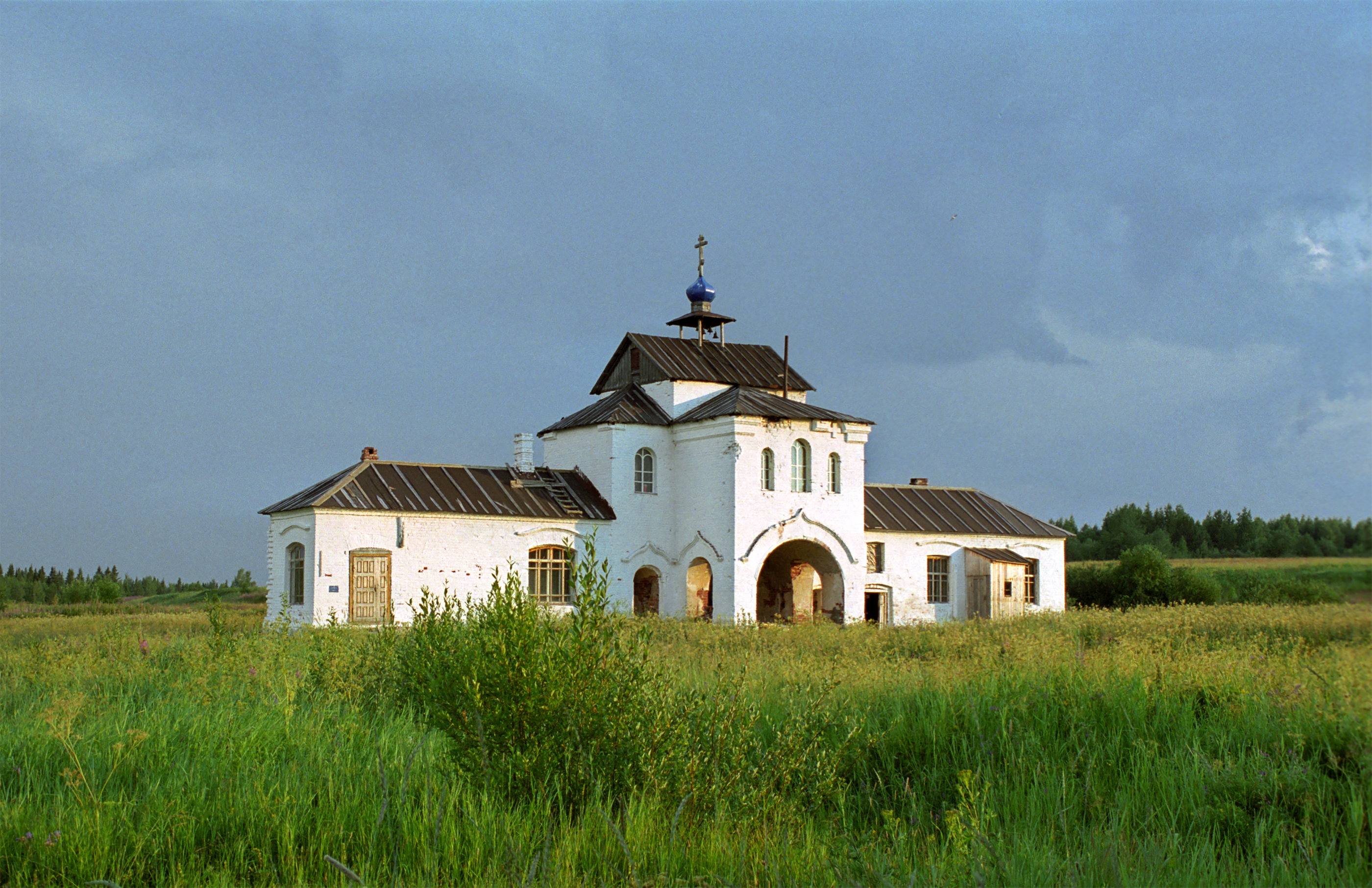
- The former gate church
- Interactive map of Kozheozersky Monastery

Monastery information
- Full name: Кожеозерский монастырь
- Order: Russian Orthodox Church
- Established: 1550s, 1853, 1999
- Disestablished: 1764, 1919
- Diocese: Diocese of Plesetsk

People
- Founders: Niphont of Kozheozero, Serapion of Kozheozero
- Important associated figures: Nikodim of Khozyuga, Patriarch Nikon

Site
- Location: Lake Kozheozero, Arkhangelsk Oblast, Russia
- Public access: Yes

The Kozheozersky Monastery (Russian: Кожеозерский монастырь) is a Russian Orthodox monastery founded by Niphont of Kozheozero and Serapion of Kozheozero in the 1550s. The monastery is located on a peninsula in Lake Kozhozero, in Onezhsky District in the north-west of Arkhangelsk Oblast, Russia. Kozheozersky Monastery is one of the most remote monasteries in Russia. There are no roads leading to Kozhozero, and the only way to get to the monastery is by traversing 30 kilometres (19 mi) on foot.

== History ==
In the 16th century the valley of the Onega River was already populated, and the ascetic monks were looking for remote places to get away from people. Niphont of Kozheozero, a monk in the Syryinsky Monastery close to the selo of Chekuyevo, in the lower course of the Onega, arrived to Lake Kozhozero. According to the tradition, this occurred in 1552. In 1557, Sergey, a baptized Tatar prince, arrived to Lake Kozhozero and became a monk, taking the name Serapion. He later became the first hegumen of the monastery. Since the lands around Lake Kozhozero were not suitable for agriculture, the monastery was initially poor. In 1585, Tsar Feodor Ivanovich transferred lands around the lake to the monastery, and two churches were built. Serapion died in 1611. The next hegumen was Avraamy, who was the disciple of Serapion and died in 1634. The only saint ever living in the monastery was Nikodim of Khozyuga, who came to Kozhozero in 1607, and in 1609 left for a remote location 14 kilometres (8.7 mi) from Kozheozersky Monastery.

Nikon, the future patriarch of Moscow and reformer of Russian Orthodox Church, arrived to the monastery in 1641 and was the hegumen from 1643 to 1646. During his period, he solicited considerable investments from two tsars. In 1646, he left for Moscow for some business related to the monastery, and never returned, getting a new appointment.

In 1670, the monastery served as a place for political exile. In the 17th century, it was growing and became rich, however, in the 18th century the financial state of the monastery deteriorated. In 1722 the last hegumen, Georgy, died, and subsequently the monastery was headed by a "builder" (Russian: строитель). The first builder was Korniliy (1722-1738). In the beginning of the 1730s, a disastrous fire destroyed all wooden buildings of the monastery, and it was never able to recover. In 1758, the monastery was subordinated to Spaso-Kargopolsky Monastery in Kargopol, and in 1764, it was shut down. Between the 1650s and 1764, 346 monks in total lived in the monastery.

Kozheozersky monastery was reopened in 1853. In 1764, former monastery buildings were turned into a village, and the village population was forcibly resettled in 1853. Until the 1880s, the monastery was poorly managed and remained in a difficult financial situation. The situation improved when Pitirim, formerly a monk in Solovetsky Monastery, became a hegumen in 1885. He renewed the monastery buildings and built a road to the monastery.

During the Civil War in Russia, Kozheozersky Monastery was on the front line between Red and White armies. For some time, it remained on the territory subject to the White government in Arkhangelsk, and a White Army detachment was stationed in the monastery. The front line was close to the selo of Chekuyevo. In the winter 1919/1920, the Red Army underwent a massive attack and, in particular, took the monastery over. The monastery was closed, the fate of the monks is unknown.

For some time, the ruins of Kozheozersky monastery hosted resettled peasants. This settlement was known as Kozhposyolok. In 1954, Kozhposyolok was abandoned, and the monastery was repopulated in 1997 and consecrated in 1999. The only monk permanently residing in the monastery is the hegumen.

== List of hegumens ==
- Nephon (1552 - ?)
- Serapion (? - 1611)
- Abraham (1611-1634)
- Jonah (1634-1643)
- Nikon (1643-1646)
- Theodosius (1655-1662)
- Paul (1663-1680)
- Ananias (1693-1698)
- Matthew (Spitsyn) (1707-1715)
