= Unezhma =

Unezhma (Russian: Унежма) is the name of several rural localities in Onezhsky District of Arkhangelsk Oblast, Russia:

- Unezhma, Sulozersky Selsoviet, Onezhsky District, Arkhangelsk Oblast, a settlement in Sulozersky Selsoviet
- Unezhma, Maloshuyka, Onezhsky District, Arkhangelsk Oblast, a village under the administrative jurisdiction of Maloshuyka Urban-Type Settlement with Jurisdictional Territory
