= Mudyuga =

Mudyuga Мудьюга
- Settlement
- Location within Arkhangelsk Oblast Location within Russia
- Coordinates: 63°46′N 39°15′E
- Country: Russia
- Region: Arkhangelsk Oblast
- District: Onezhsky District
- Time zone: UTC+3:00

Mudyuga (Russian: Му́дьюга) is a rural locality (a settlement) in Onezhsky District, Arkhangelsk Oblast, Russia. The population was 573 as of 2010. There are 14 streets.

== Geography ==
Mudyuga is located on the Mudyuga River, 77 km southeast of the town Onega (the district's administrative centre) by road. Verkhovye is the nearest rural locality.
