= Kodino =

Kodino Кодино
- Settlement
- Location within Arkhangelsk Oblast Location within Russia
- Coordinates: 63°43′N 39°38′E
- Country: Russia
- Region: Arkhangelsk Oblast
- District: Onezhsky District
- Time zone: UTC+3:00

Kodino (Russian: Ко́дино) is a rural locality (a settlement) in Onezhsky District, Arkhangelsk Oblast, Russia. The population was 1,514 as of 2010. There are 20 streets.

== Geography ==
Kodino is located on the Kodina River, 103 km southeast of Onega (the district's administrative centre) by road.
