= Staple Island =

Island in Northumberland, England

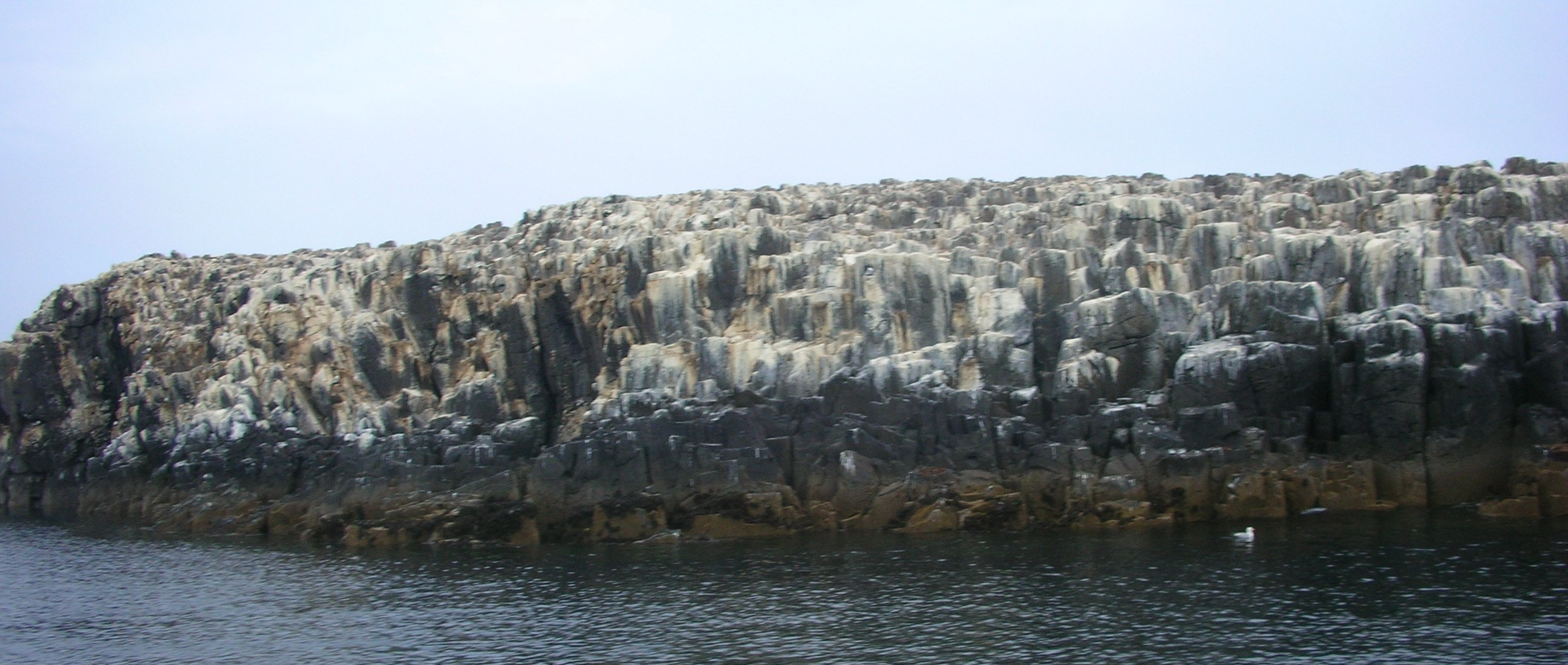
- Staple Island

- Location within Northumberland

Geography
- Location: Northumberland, England, UK; Grid Reference NU230378
- Coordinates: 55.631°N 1.624°W

Staple Island is a small rocky island, or skerry, that is one of the Outer Group of the Farne Islands in Northumberland, England. The Farne Islands are a designated National Nature Reserve. Staple Island is an important wildlife habitat known for its prolific breeding colonies of Atlantic puffins, razorbills and kittiwakes. A notable colony of grey seals breeds on the island with pups born every year in September–November.

Staple Island is the southwesternmost of the Outer Group of Farne Islands, which are separated from the Inner Group by Staple Sound. The sound is about 550 m (1,800 ft) wide and is subject to very strong currents, especially during spring tides. The island has vertical cliffs on its southern side, and some detached rocks looking like broken pillars, known as "The Pinnacles". From the southwestern point, a dangerous ridge of rocks known as "Gun Reef" extends to the northwest. They begin to be uncovered when the tide is halfway through its ebb cycle.

The island has no permanent population but local boats are licensed to land passengers. The National Trust owns and manages the island and has bird wardens on site during part of the year. Although now uninhabited, the island has a history associated with the early monastic settlement of nearby Lindisfarne. It does however provide breeding ground for large populations of seabirds.

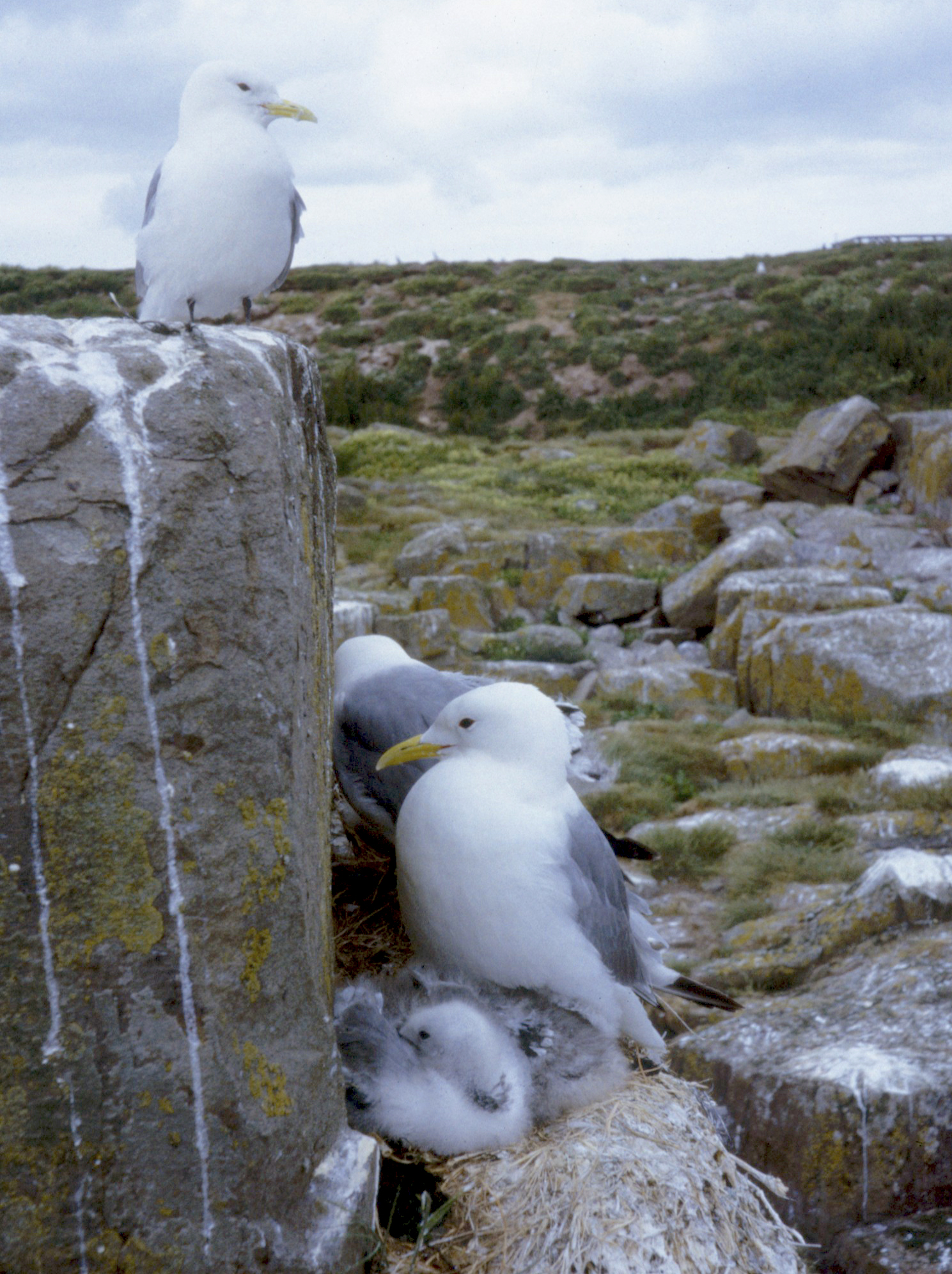
Black-legged kittiwake (Rissa tridactyla) at nest on Staple Island

A lighthouse was built on Staple Island in 1778 and blown down in 1784; a replacement, built either in the same place or on nearby Brownsman's Island, was knocked down by heavy seas in 1800.

== See also ==
- Auk
- Skerry
