= Vorzogory =

Rural locality in Onezhsky District, Russia

Coordinates: 65°53′34″N 37°40′36″E

Vorzogory (Russian: Ворзогоры) is a rural locality (a selo) in Onezhsky District of the Arkhangelsk Oblast, Russia.

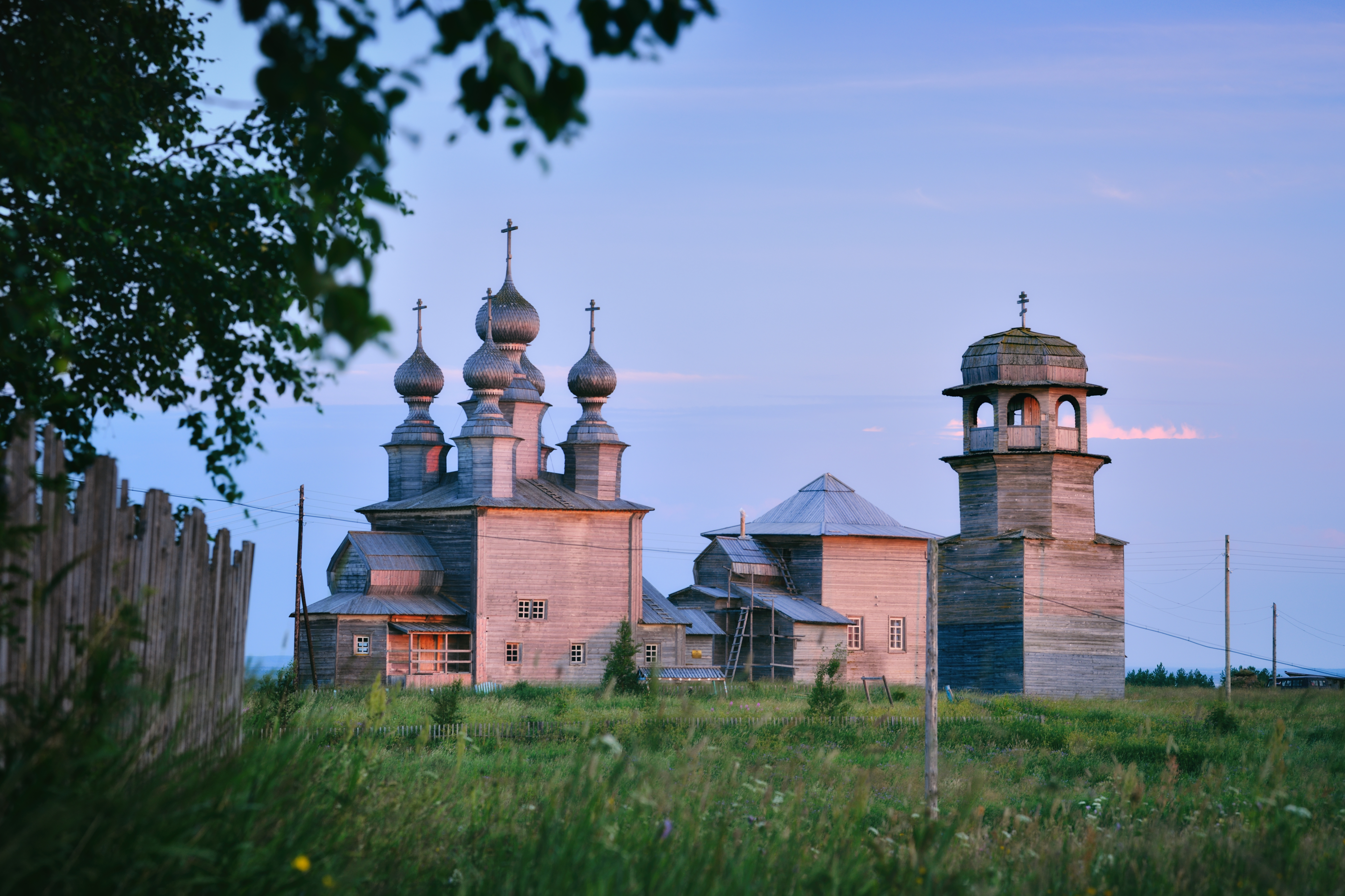
Vorzogory

In 2016 Vorzogory was included in The Most Beautiful Villages in Russia.
