= Onega Bay =

Coordinates: 64°20′N 36°30′E

Designations

Ramsar Wetland
- Official name: Islands in Onega Bay, White Sea
- Designated: 13 September 1994
- Reference no.: 668

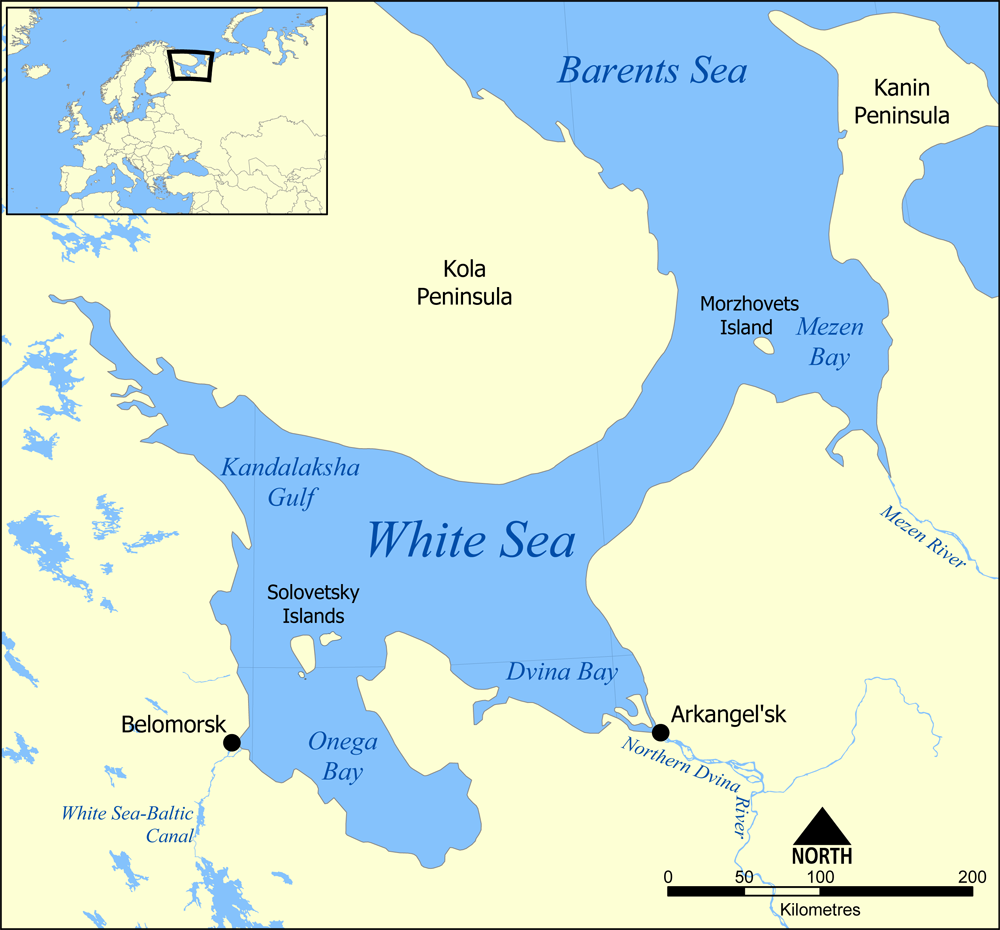
The Onega Bay on the map of the White Sea.

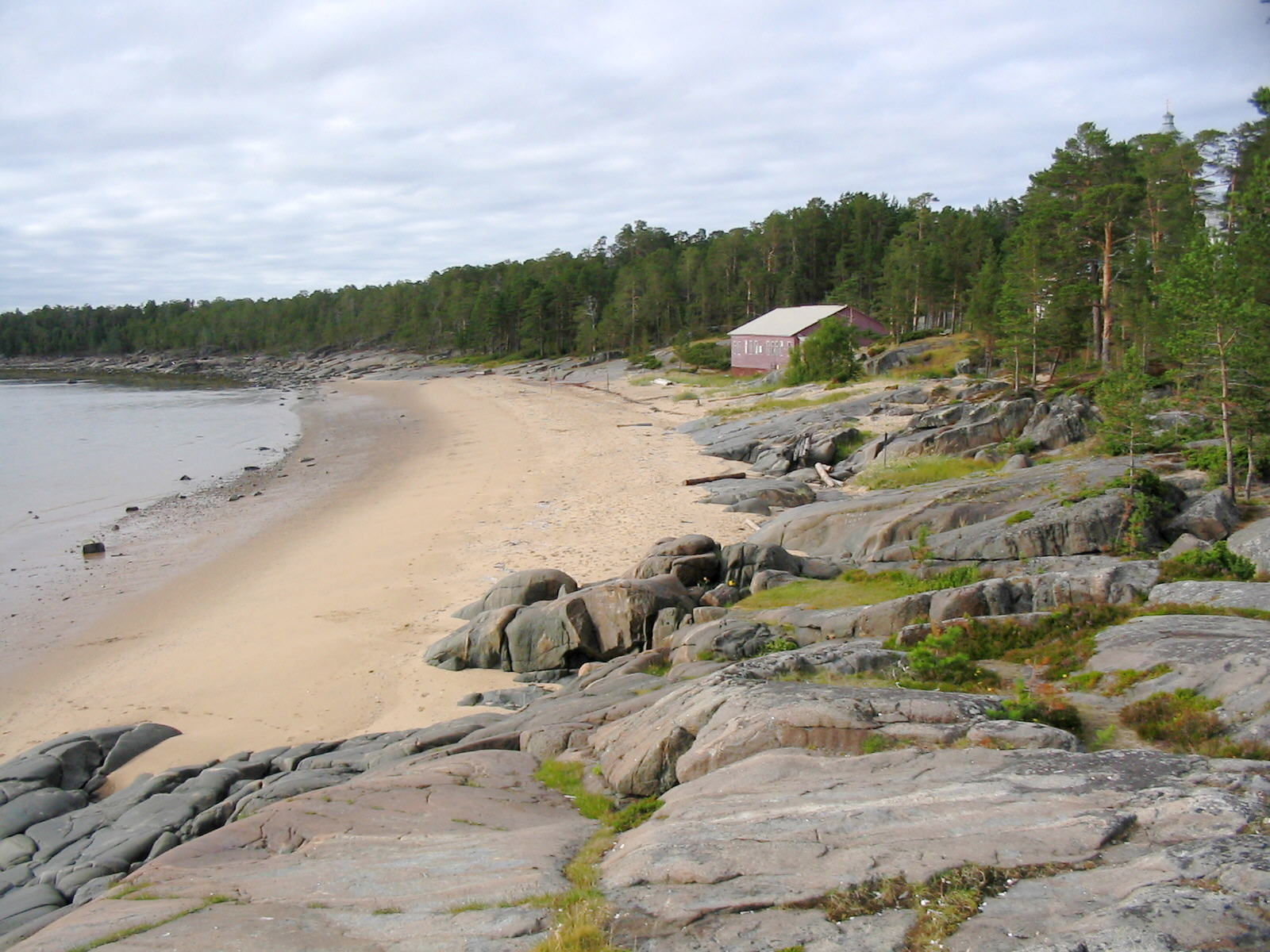
Shore of the bay in Kiy Island.

The Onega Bay (Russian: Онежская губа, Онежский залив) is located in the Republic of Karelia and Arkhangelsk Oblast in Northwestern Russia, west of the city of Arkhangelsk. It is the southernmost of four large bays and gulfs of the White Sea, the others being the Dvina Bay, the Mezen Bay, and the Kandalaksha Gulf. The area of the bay is 6,630 square kilometres (2,560 sq mi). The Onega Bay is 185 kilometres (115 mi) long and 50 kilometres (31 mi)-100 kilometres (62 mi) wide. The average depth of the bay is 16 metres (52 ft), and the maximum depth is 36 metres (118 ft). The bay freezes in winter.

Onega, Kem, and Vyg rivers flow into the bay. The bay has numerous islands. Solovetsky Islands, which are the largest and the most famous, are located on the entrance to the bay and separate it from the main body of the White Sea. Along the west coast, there are hundreds of small islands (Russian: луда, luda's). The biggest of these are Shuyostrov Island, Russky Kuzov Island, Myagostrov Island, Kondostrov Island, and Sumostrov Island. The group of islands around Kondostrov Island are collectively known as the Sumsky Skerries. Between the Sumsky Skerries and Solovetsky Island, in the open sea, there is an archipelago consisting of Bolshoy Zhuzhmuy Island and Maly Zhuzhmuy Island. On the west coast of the bay there are the town of Belomorsk and the outlet of the White Sea–Baltic Canal. From the east, the bay is limited by the Onega Peninsula. In the south-east, the town of Onega is located close to the shore of the bay.

Administratively, the coast and the islands are shared between Kemsky and Belomorsky Districts of the Republic of Karelia, and Onezhsky, Primorsky, and Solovetsky Districts of Arkhangelsk Oblast. Most of the minor islands, including all of Sumsky Skerries, belong to Belomorsky District.

== Human settlement ==
The Onega Bay coast was populated by Russians (Novgorodians, of whom the pomors are the descendants) not later than in the 12th century. The selo of Soroki, currently Belomorsk, is known from that time. Most of the villages at the Onega Bay coast such as Purnema or Unezhma (now abandoned), are old Pomor villages, many of them still depend on fishery.

== Travel ==
Solovetsky Islands are on the World Heritage list, and there is intensive passenger sea traffic to the islands, mostly originating from Kem and Belomorsk. There are also regular but infrequent passenger connections between Arkhangelsk and the villages of the Onega Peninsula.

== See also ==
- White Sea Rift System
