= Lake Kozhozero =

Lake in Arkhangelsk Oblast, Russia

Lake Kozhozero Кожозеро
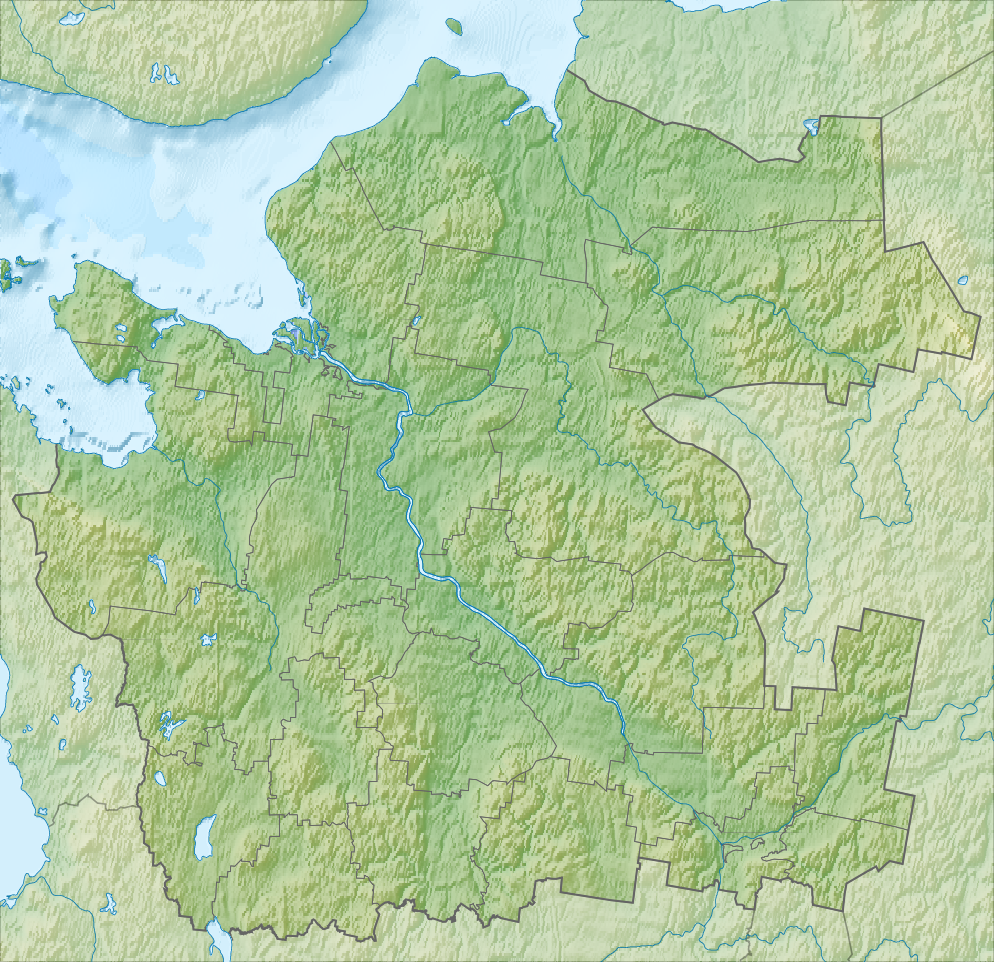
- Location within Arkhangelsk Oblast
- Location: Arkhangelsk Oblast
- Coordinates: 63°08′N 38°08′E
- Primary inflows: Podlomka
- Primary outflows: Kozha
- Catchment area: 2,560 square kilometres (990 mi^{2})
- Basin countries: Russia
- Surface area: 97.4 square kilometres (37.6 mi^{2})

The Onega River basin. Lake Kozhozero is shown on the map.

Lake Kozhozero (Russian: Кожозеро) is a freshwater lake, located in the south of Onezhsky District of Arkhangelsk Oblast in Russia. It is one of the biggest lakes in Arkhangelsk Oblast and biggest one in Onezhsky District. The area of the lake is 97.4 square kilometres (37.6 mi^{2}), and the area of its basin is 2,560 square kilometres (990 mi^{2}). Lake Kozhozero is the source of the river Kozha, which is a left tributary of the Onega and thus belongs to the White Sea basin. The lake is located in the remote area and is not connected to the outside world by any all-season roads. It is notable as a location of the Kozheozersky Monastery, known since 1560.

The basin of Lake Kozhozero comprises areas in the south of Onezhsky District as well as in the north-west of Plesetsky District, also in Arkhangelsk Oblast.

The lake is elongated from the north-west to the south-east, and approximately in the middle is crossed into two parts by a peninsula attached to the eastern shore. The Kozheozersky Monastery is located at the neck of the peninsula. The Kozha River flows out of the northern part of the lake. Lake Kozhozero is the biggest from the system of connected freshwater lakes, which also include Lake Vingozero to the north-west and Lake Kurusskoye to the east.

The peninsula originally was an island, known as Kozheostrov. Nikon, the future patriarch of Moscow and reformer of Russian Orthodox Church, was a hegumen of the monastery from 1643 to 1646. During his tenure, the island was connected by a dam with the shore and became a peninsula. The monastery was closed down in 1918, and for some time its ruins hosted resettled peasants. This settlement was known as Kozhposyolok. In 1954, Kozhposyolok was abandoned, and the monastery was repopulated in 1997 and consecrated in 1999. There are no other settlements on Lake Kozhozero.
