= Vatega (air base) =

Former Russian air base

Vatega Onega Andozero
- Ватега авиабазы
- Onega, Arkhangelsk Oblast in Russia

Site information
- Type: Air Base
- Owner: Ministry of Defence
- Operator: Russian Air Force

Location
- Shown within Arkhangelsk Oblast Vatega (Russia)
- Coordinates: 63°55′24″N 038°24′42″E

Site history
- Built: 1977
- In use: 1977 - 1995

Airfield information
- Identifiers: ICAO: ZA0F
- Elevation: 87 metres (285 ft) AMSL
Runways
Direction	Length and surface
12/30	3,500 metres (11,483 ft) Concrete

Vatega (also Onega Andozero (US)), Ватега авиабазы, is an abandoned air base in Russia located 16 km east of the port town of Onega, Arkhangelsk Oblast and 127 km southwest of Arkhangelsk. It was designed as a highly modernized, large airfield for the Soviet Union's heavy bomber fleet.

The earliest available Western intelligence documents identified the airfield in 1977 as under construction. Some Russian sources claim the airfield was intended to serve as an alternate landing site for the Soviet 'Buran' space shuttle. Construction ceased in the mid-1980s due to the slowdown in the Russian economy, and the military abandoned the property in 1995.

During the late 1990s and early 2000s, Vatega was extensively dismantled and sold for scrap. Around 2004 some of the guilty parties were reportedly convicted and either sent to prison or forced to pay heavy fines.
