= Purnema =

Purnema Пурнема
- Selo
- Location within Arkhangelsk Oblast Location within Russia
- Coordinates: 64°22′N 37°25′E
- Country: Russia
- Region: Arkhangelsk Oblast
- District: Onezhsky District
- Time zone: UTC+3:00

Purnema (Russian: Пурнема) is a rural locality (a selo) in Pokrovskoye Rural Settlement of Onezhsky District, Arkhangelsk Oblast, Russia. The population was 169 as of 2010. There are 3 streets.

== Geography ==
Purnema is located 104 km northwest of Onega (the district's administrative centre) by road. Nizhmozero is the nearest rural locality.
