= The Skerries (Victoria) =

Islands in Victoria, Australia

- Location within Shire of East Gippsland
- Etymology: Skerry

Geography
- Location: Bass Strait
- Coordinates: 37°45′19″S 149°31′05″E
- Length: 350 m (1150 ft)
- Width: 200 m (700 ft)

Administration
- Australia
- State: Victoria

The Skerries comprise three small, rocky islands 100 metres (330 ft) offshore from the mouth of the Wingan River, in East Gippsland, Victoria, Australia.

The islands are part of Croajingolong National Park. They are the site of a significant Australian fur seal colony, with an estimated 14,000 seals (12.4% of the population) in 2010.

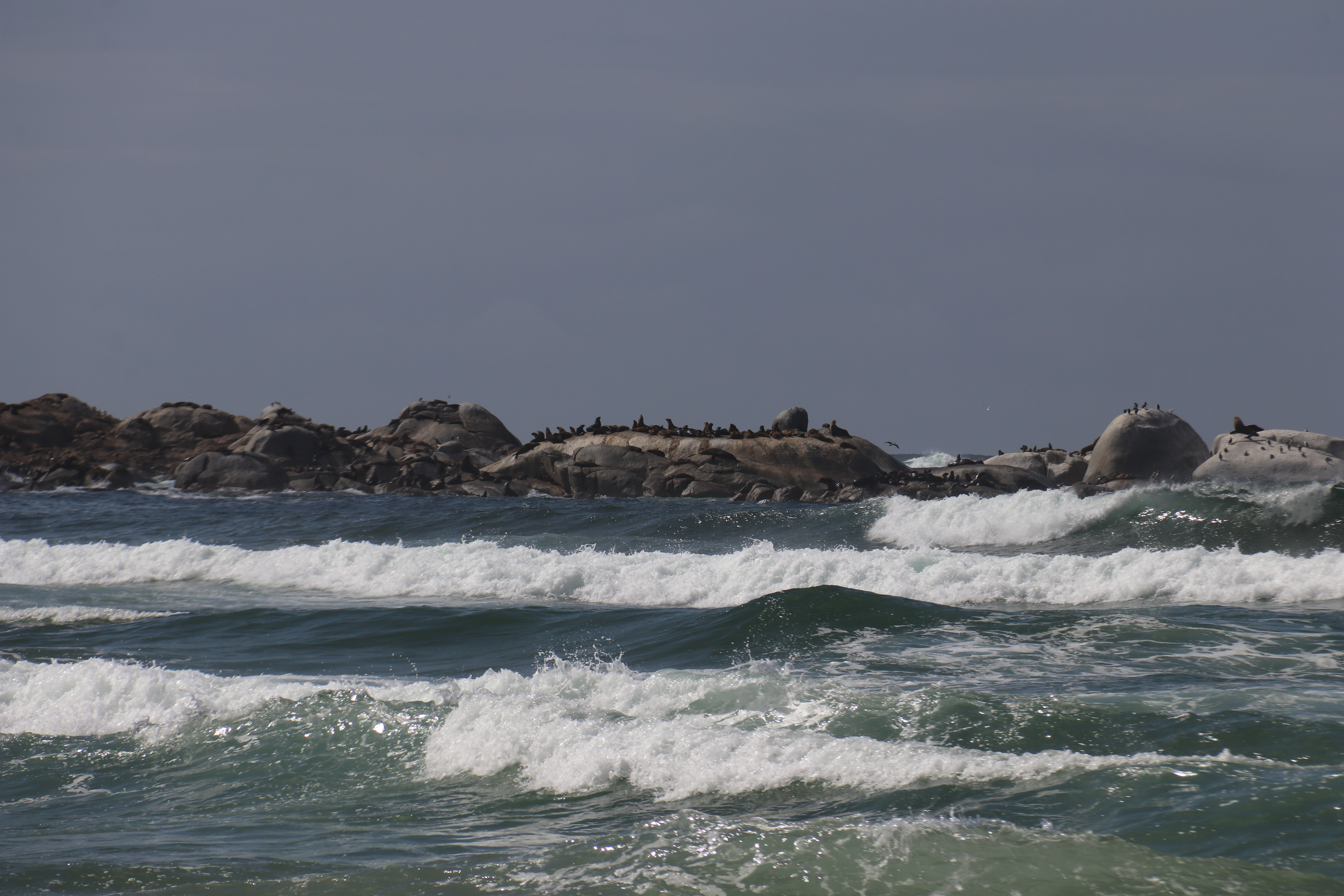
View of The Skerries and some of the seal population from the beach near Wingan River, December 2024
