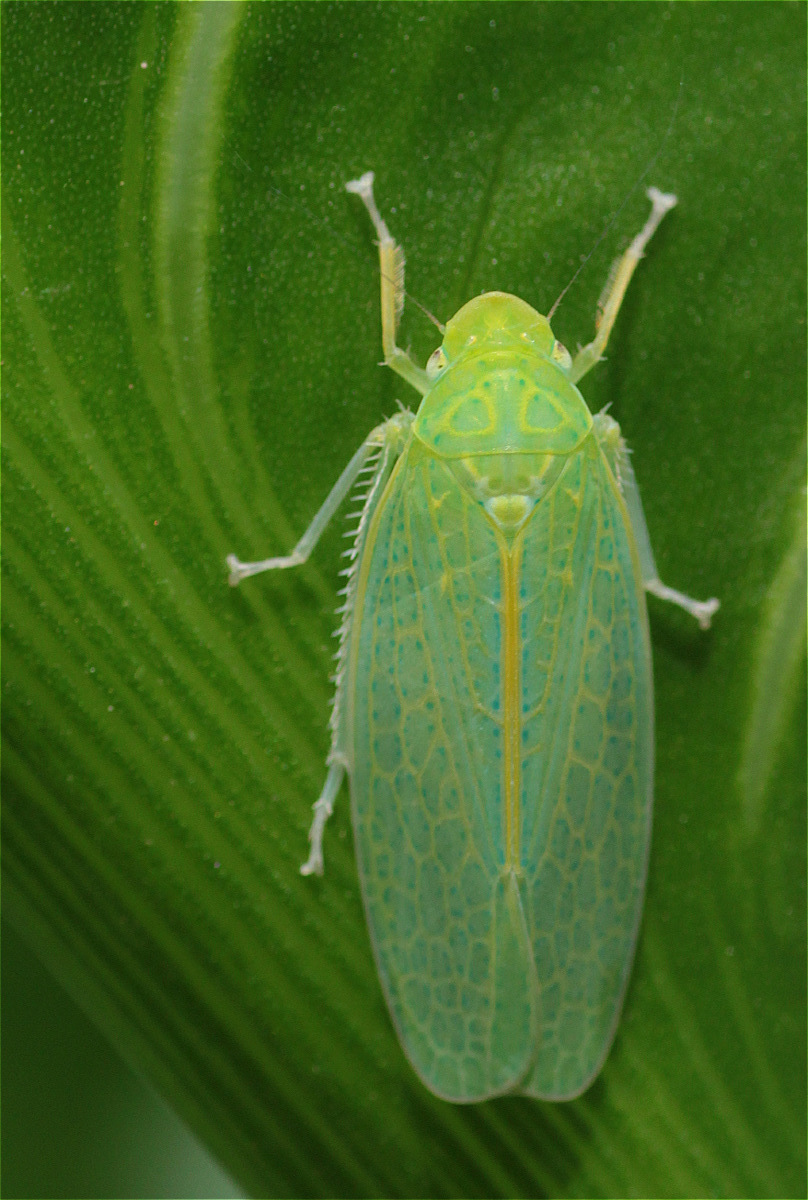

Scientific classification
- Domain: Eukaryota
- Kingdom: Animalia
- Phylum: Arthropoda
- Class: Insecta
- Order: Hemiptera
- Suborder: Auchenorrhyncha
- Family: Cicadellidae
- Genus: Onega
- Species: O. bracteata

Binomial name
- Onega bracteata Young, 1977

= Onega bracteata =

Species of leafhopper

Onega bracteata is a species of leafhoppers in the family Cicadellidae. It is native to Andean South America.

== Description ==
Onega bracteata is a rather large and compact sharpshooter with a length from 13.8 to 15 mm. Females are usually slightly larger than males. The pronotum is wider than the head. The veination is distinct but veins are not elevated.

== Distribution ==
Onega bracteata has been described from Ecuador, Peru, Colombia and Bolivia where it was found in Andean locations 2000 m or more above sea level.
