= Chekuyevo =

Chekuyevo Чекуево
- Selo
- Location within Arkhangelsk Oblast Location within Russia
- Coordinates: 63°34′N 38°58′E
- Country: Russia
- Region: Arkhangelsk Oblast
- District: Onezhsky District
- Time zone: UTC+3:00

Chekuyevo (Russian: Чекуево) is a rural locality (a selo) in Chekuyevskoye Rural Settlement of Onezhsky District, Arkhangelsk Oblast, Russia. The population was 3 as of 2010.

== Geography ==
It is located on the left bank of the Onega River, 88 km southeast of Onega (the district's administrative centre) by road. Pyantino is the nearest rural locality.
