= Pervomaysky, Plesetsky District, Arkhangelsk Oblast =

Pervomaysky Первомайский
- Settlement
- Location within Arkhangelsk Oblast Location within Russia
- Coordinates: 63°35′N 40°01′E
- Country: Russia
- Region: Arkhangelsk Oblast
- District: Plesetsky District
- Time zone: UTC+3:00

Pervomaysky (Russian: Первомайский) is a rural locality (a settlement) in Obozerskoye Rural Settlement of Plesetsky District, Arkhangelsk Oblast, Russia. The population was 123 as of 2010.

== Geography ==
Pervomaysky is located 139 km north of Plesetsk (the district's administrative centre) by road. Bolshaya Kyama is the nearest rural locality.
