= Sumsky Skerries =

Island group in White Sea, Russia

Coordinates: 64°24′N 35°30′E

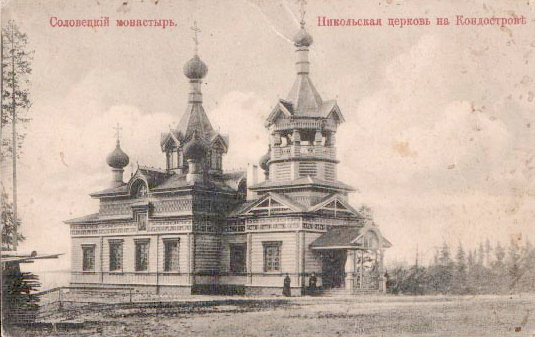
Church on Kondostrov Island, Sumsky Skerries

The Sumsky Skerries (Russian: Сумские шхеры, Sumskiye Shkhery) are an extensive cluster of islands, islets and shoals in the White Sea. They are located in the Onega Bay, close to its southern shore.

The largest islands of these skerries are: Sosnovtsy, Bolshoy Varbostrov, Malyy Varbostrov, Berezovets, Raydostrov, Ugmorin and Kondostrov.

This island group belongs to the Republic of Karelia administrative division of the Russian Federation.

== See also ==
- Birdlife
- Mokhova О.Н., Malygin S.B., RESULTS OF RESEARCH OF FUCALES SEAWEED VEGETATION IN THE WHITE SEA`S SUMSKY SKERRIES ISLANDS; Northern Branch PINRO, Arkhangelsk.
