= Onega (leafhopper) =

Scientific classification
- Domain: Eukaryota
- Kingdom: Animalia
- Phylum: Arthropoda
- Class: Insecta
- Order: Hemiptera
- Suborder: Auchenorrhyncha
- Family: Cicadellidae
- Subfamily: Cicadellinae
- Tribe: Cicadellini
- Genus: Onega; Distant, 1908

Genus of leafhoppers

Onega is a genus of leafhoppers in the family Cicadellidae.

== Description ==
All ten species are comparably large leafhoppers with a size between 12.4 and 16.8 millimeters. The pronotum of Onega is typically wider than the head and the scutellum is swollen.

== Distribution ==
Onega occurs in the Andean rainforests of Peru, Ecuador, Colombia and Bolivia. Old records of Onega from the Caribbean islands are now believed to have been mislabelled.

== Species ==
There are ten recognized species:

- Onega avella Distant, 1908
- Onega bracteata Young, 1977
- Onega fassli Young, 1977
- Onega freytagi Takiya & Cavichioli, 2004
- Onega krameri Takiya & Cavichioli, 2004
- Onega musa Ferreira, Lozada & Takiya, 2018
- Onega orphne Takiya & Cavichioli, 2004
- Onega sanguinicollis (Latreille, 1807)
- Onega stella Distant, 1908
- Onega stipata (Walker, 1851)
