= Porog, Kaduysky District, Vologda Oblast =

Porog Порог
- Village
- Location within Vologda Oblast Location within Russia
- Coordinates: 59°35′N 36°27′E
- Country: Russia
- Region: Vologda Oblast
- District: Kaduysky District
- Time zone: UTC+3:00

Porog (Russian: Порог) is a rural locality (a village) in Semizerye Rural Settlement, Kaduysky District, Vologda Oblast, Russia. The population was 21 as of 2002.

== Geography ==
Porog is located 72 km northwest of Kaduy (the district's administrative centre) by road. Sosnovka is the nearest rural locality.
