= Kiy Island =

Island in Onega Bay, White Sea, Russia

Native name: Кий-остров
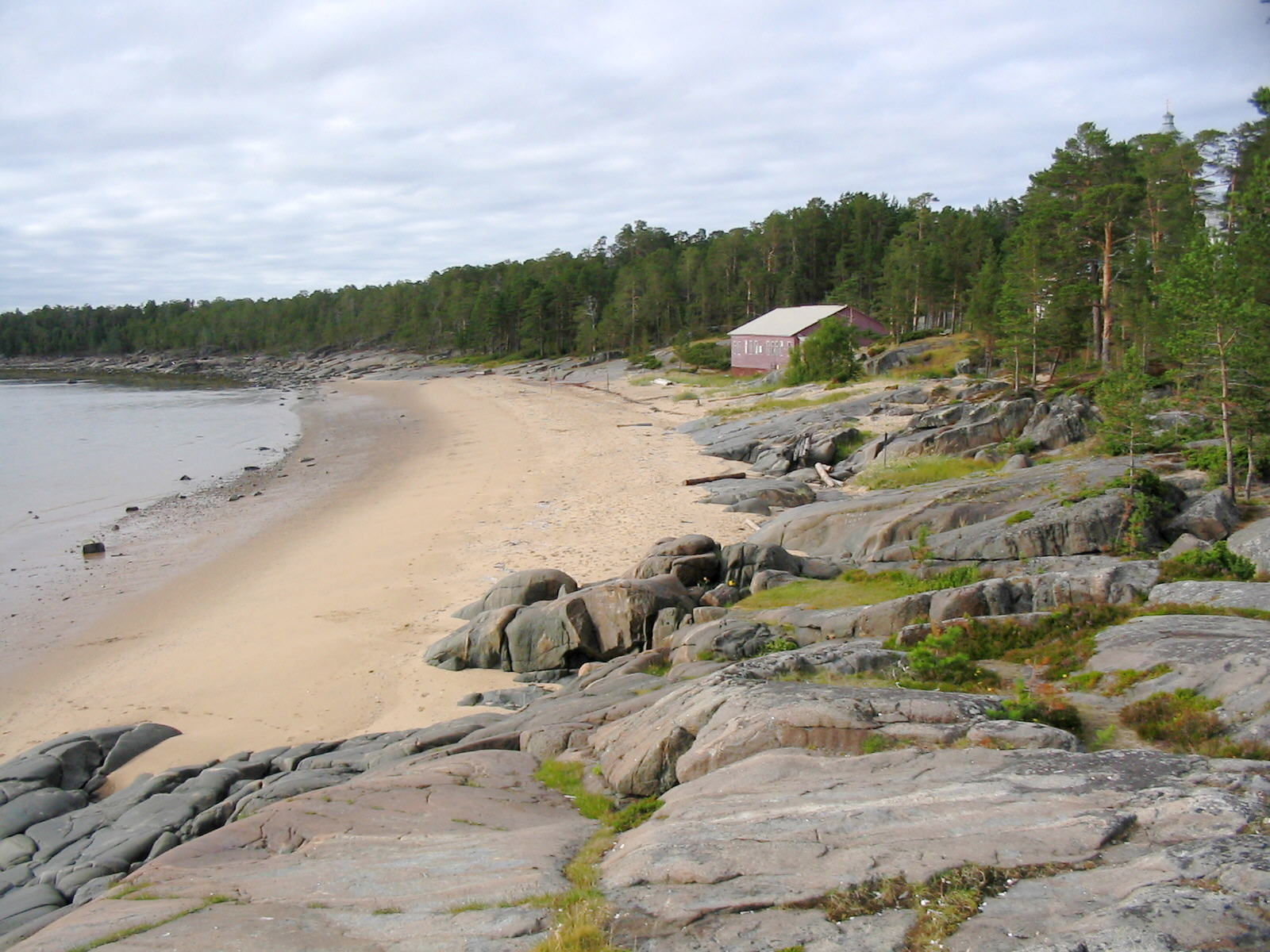
- The Krestny Monastery ensemble on Kiy Island
- Interactive map of Kiy Island

Geography
- Location: Onega Bay, White Sea
- Coordinates: 63.9986°N 37.8917°E
- Area: 1.6 km^{2} (0.62 sq mi)
- Length: 2 km (1.2 mi)
- Width: 0.8 km (0.5 mi)

Administration
- Russia
- Oblast: Arkhangelsk Oblast

Demographics
- Population: 0 (Seasonal tourists)

Additional information
- Site of the Kiysky Krestny Monastery

Kiy Island (Russian: Кий-остров) is an island in the Onega Bay of the White Sea, 8 km off-shore and 15 km from the town of Onega. The island stretches for 2 kilometres from north-west to south-east, but its width does not exceed 800 metres. The island includes wide and sandy beaches, piny woods rich with berries, and large rocks. It has a remarkably interesting architectural ensemble, and hosts the history of the Kiysky Krestny monastery. Thousands of tourists go and visit the island.

== History ==
In 1632 the future Patriarch Nikon attempted to escape from the Solovki to the Kozheozero Monastery in the south. As Nikon later recalled, a tempest broke out and his life was at peril. The monk began to pray to the holy cross and soon his boat was cast ashore on Kiy Island, where he erected a wooden cross to thank heaven.

Twenty years later, he went from Novgorod to the Solovki in order to bring the relics of Metropolitan Philip to Moscow. On his way he visited Kiy Island and was pleased to see his wooden cross still standing. Upon becoming the Patriarch a year later, Nikon ordered a monastery to be established on the spot. The monastery was dedicated to the True Cross in 1656, whereupon 4537 peasants were declared its property.

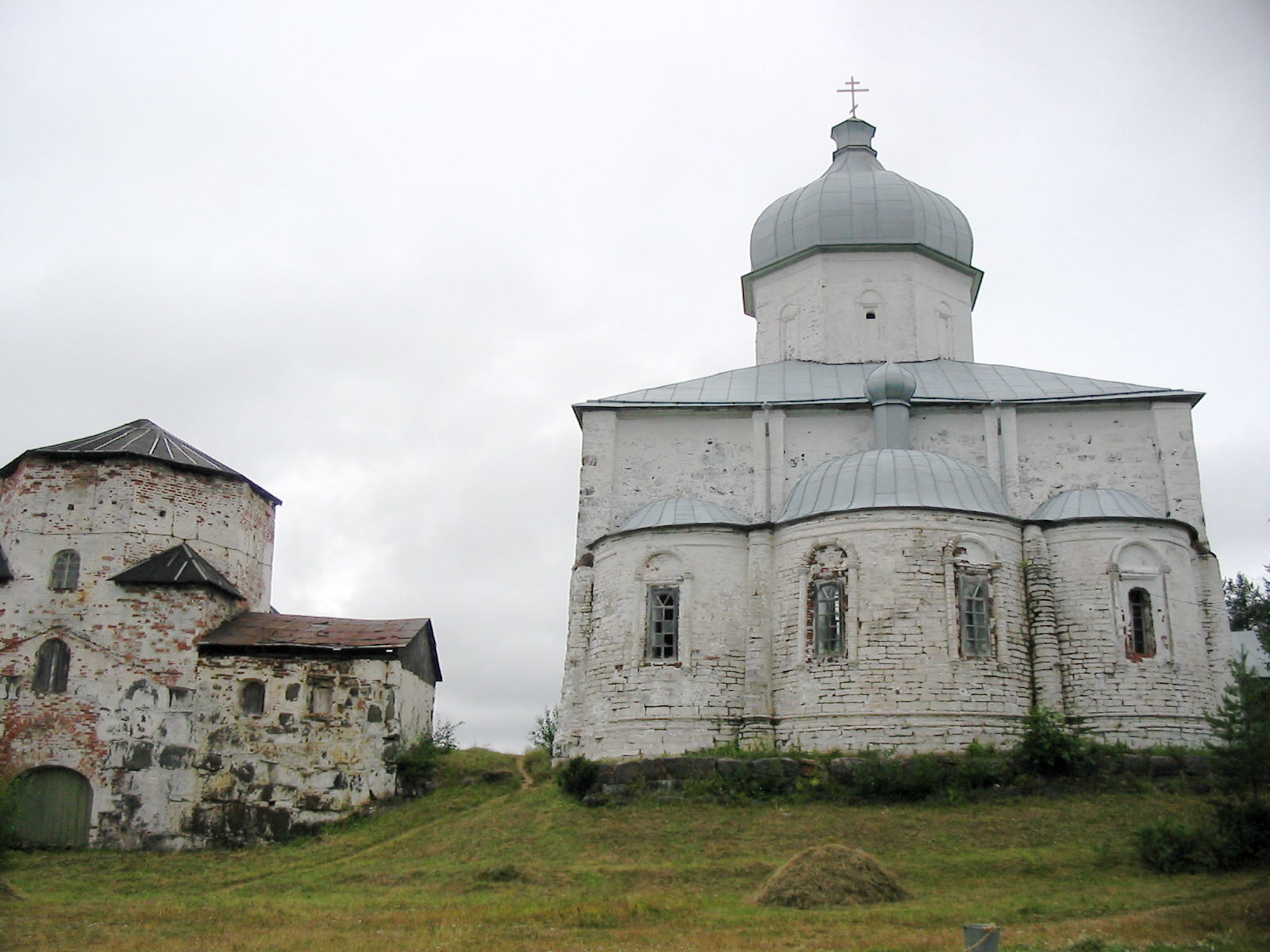
Cathedral of the Exultation: the lower part of the walls is built of local dolomite; the walls above the choir gallery are constructed of granite boulders; while the vaults and apses are brick.

Under Nikon's supervision, the Krestny Monastery (Russian: Кий-островский Крестный монастырь) became one of the richest in the region. The patriarch sent to the monks a huge cypress cross, commissioned by him in Palestine as "an exact replica of the True Cross" and lavishly decorated with jewels. In 1660 he visited the monastery for the last time and dwelled there for a year. It is believed that the wayward patriarch personally selected the location of and designed most buildings to suit his taste. It was for his own use that a singular choir loft was built within the cathedral. A large portion of monastery buildings, including the cathedral, were constructed from local granite, to be in harmony with the rocky setting.

After Nikon's fall from grace, the monastery declined and its possessions were expropriated. The British Royal Navy sacked the island during the Crimean War on 9 July 1854. The following year it was damaged by fire but the Holy Synod decided in favour of restoring the complex. The Communists disbanded the abbey in 1922.

== Buildings ==
The granite heights of the island are crowned by the four-pillared Cathedral of the Exaltation of the Cross, dedicated in the presence of Nikon on 4 September 1661. Its monumental proportions are deliberately archaic but the overall effect is unusually spacious and light for traditional Russian architecture. There were formerly three domes but only the central one still subsists. Other buildings from Nikon's period include the chapel over the well (1661), the two-storey refectory church of the Virgin's Nativity (1689), the sadly disfigured All Saints Church (1661), and various outbuildings.
