= Maloshuyka =

Maloshuyka Малошуйка
- Urban-type settlement
- Interactive map of Maloshuyka
- Location of Maloshuyka Maloshuyka (Arkhangelsk Oblast)
- Coordinates: 63°42′57″N 37°27′11″E
- Country: Russia
- Federal subject: Arkhangelsk Oblast
- Administrative district: Onezhsky District
- Elevation: 52 m (171 ft)

Population (2010 Census)
  - Total: 2,886
  - Estimate (2025): 1,844 (−36.1%)

Municipal status
  - Municipal district: Onezhsky Municipal District
  - Urban settlement: Maloshuyskoye Urban Settlement
  - Capital of: Maloshuyskoye Urban Settlement
- Time zone: UTC+3 (MSK)
- Postal code: 164894
- OKTMO ID: 11646162051

Maloshuyka (Russian: Малошу́йка) is an urban locality (an urban-type settlement) in Onezhsky District of Arkhangelsk Oblast, Russia, located on the Maloshuyka River 7 kilometers (4.3 mi) off the White Sea coast and 40 kilometers (25 mi) southwest of the town of Onega. Municipally, it is the administrative center of Maloshuyskoye Urban Settlement, one of the two urban settlements in the district. Population: 2,886 (2010 census); 3,164 (2002 census); 3,972 (1989 Soviet census)..

== History ==
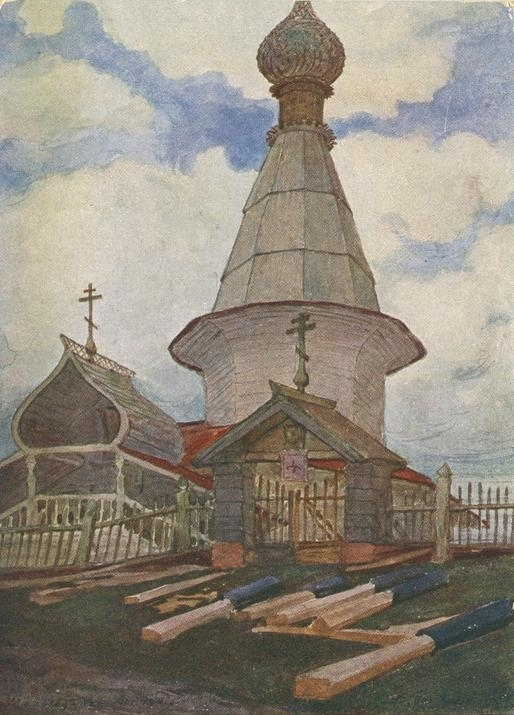
Saint Nicholas church from a 1915 postcard.

Maloshuyka is an old Pomor village. In 1924, it became the administrative center of Pomorskaya Volost of Onezhsky Uyezd, Arkhangelsk Governorate. On July 15, 1929, all volosts were abolished, and Maloshuyka became the center of Maloshuysky Selsoviet of Onezhsky District, Northern Krai.

Maloshuyka was granted urban-type settlement status in 1943.

== Economy ==
The main employer of Maloshuyka is the railroad. Maloshuyka is located on the railway line which branches off in Obozerskaya railway station from the railroad between Moscow and Arkhangelsk and runs west to Onega and Belomorsk where it joins the railroad between Petrozavodsk and Murmansk. The railroad was built during World War II to secure the transport of goods from the harbor of Murmansk to central Russia.

== Culture and recreation ==
Close to Maloshuyka, in the village of Abramovskaya, the ensemble of the Maloshuyka Pogost, consisting of wooden St. Nicholas Church (1638), the Presentation of Jesus at the Temple (1873), and the bell-tower (1825), is located. This is one of the few remaining wooden triple church ensembles, which consist of two churches (a bigger, unheated, church is used in the summer; a smaller, heated church, is used in the winter; and a bell-tower).

The wooden Ascension Church (17th century) which was located in the village of Kusheretskaya was moved to the Malye Korely open-air museum.
