= Porog, Arkhangelsk Oblast =

Porog Порог
- Selo
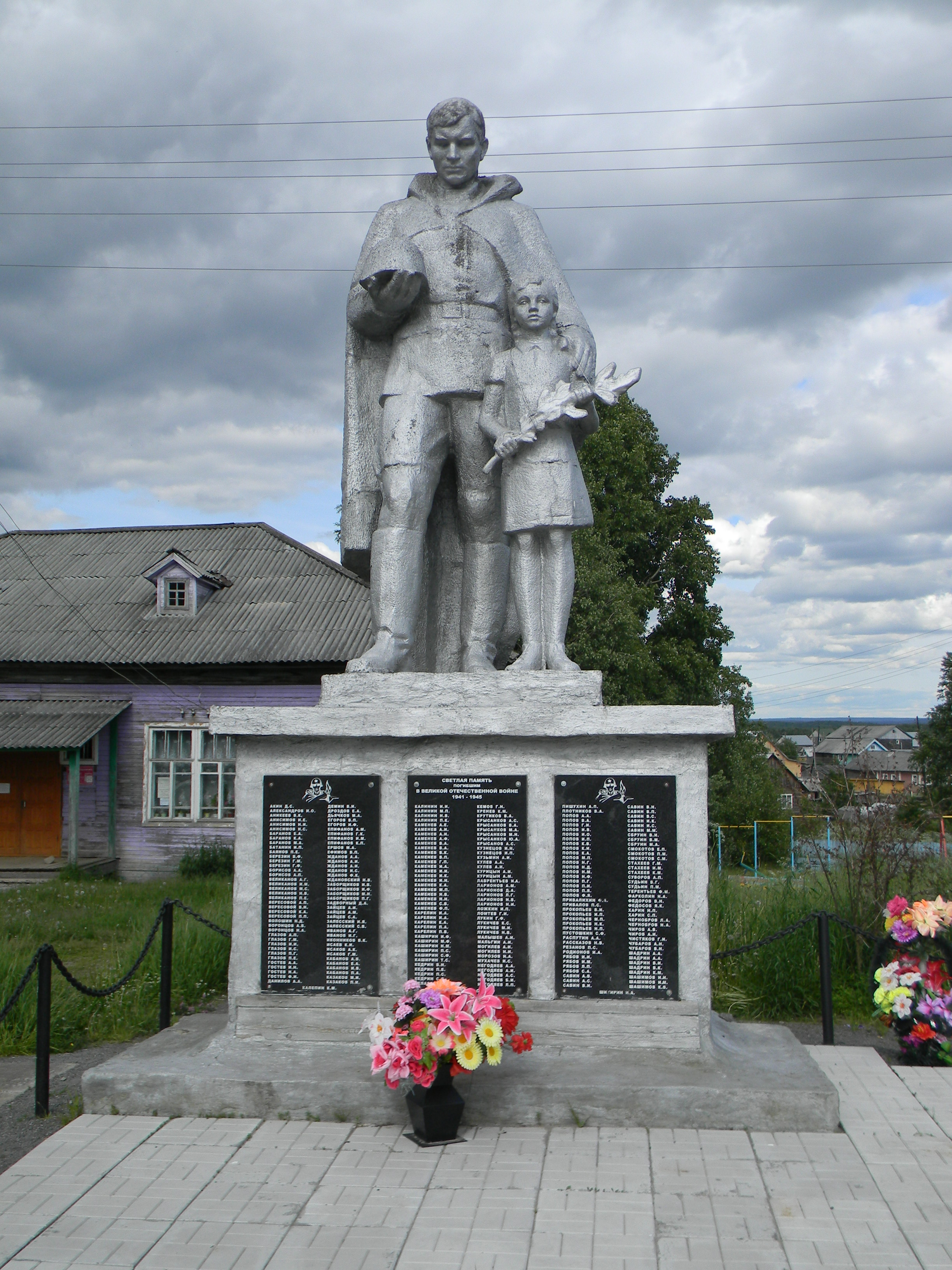
- War memorial (1941-1945).

- Location within Arkhangelsk Oblast Location within Russia
- Coordinates: 63°49′N 38°28′E
- Country: Russia
- Region: Arkhangelsk Oblast
- District: Onezhsky District
- Time zone: UTC+3:00

Porog (Russian: Порог) is a rural locality (a selo) and the administrative center of Porozhskoye Rural Settlement of Onezhsky District, Arkhangelsk Oblast, Russia. The population was 532 as of 2010. There are 9 streets.

== Geography ==
Porog is located on the Onega River, 25 km southeast of Onega (the district's administrative centre) by road. Pavlovskaya is the nearest rural locality.
