= Skerry =

Rocky island smaller than an islet

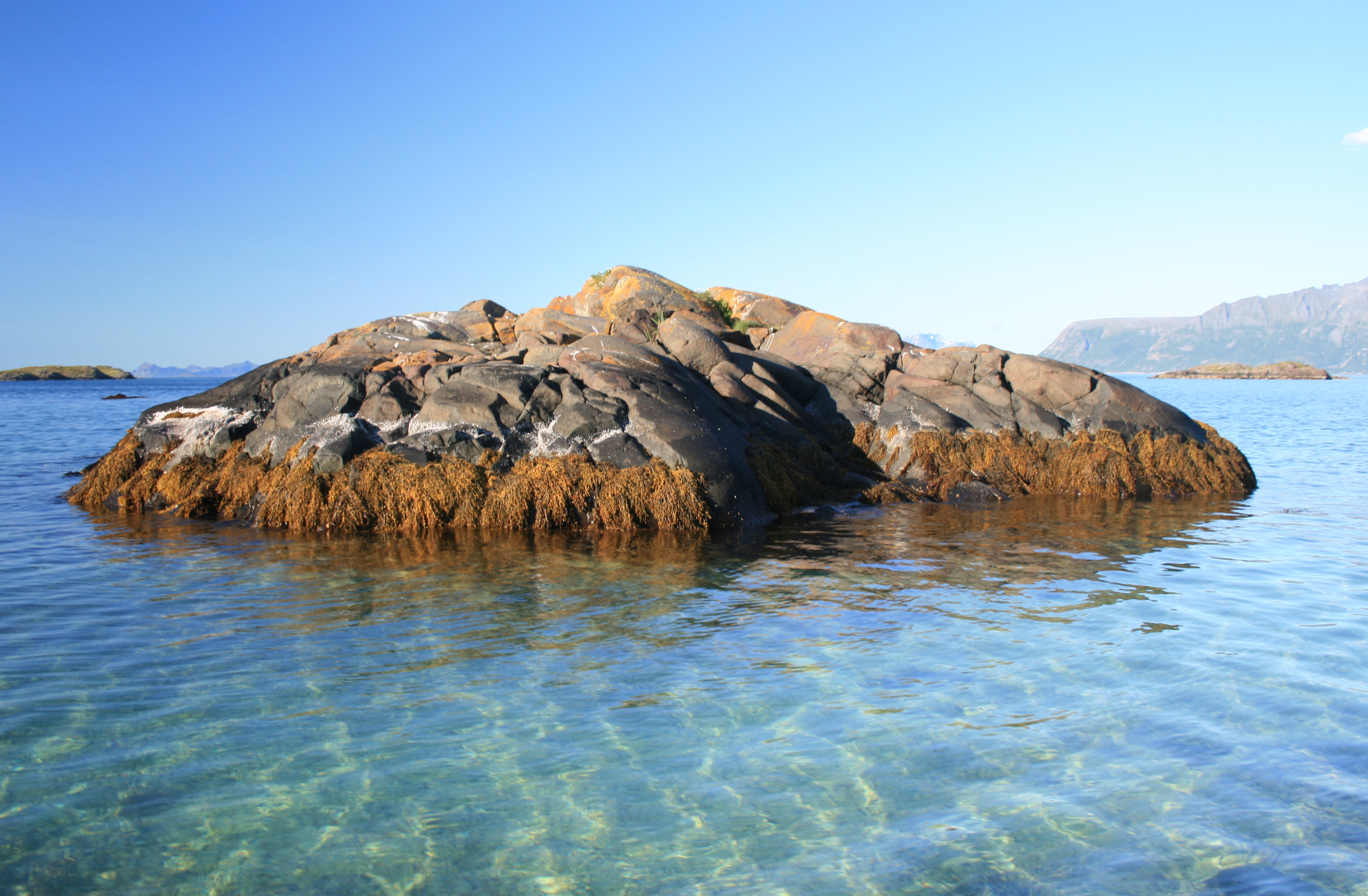
Skerry outside Krøttøy in Harstad Municipality, Norway

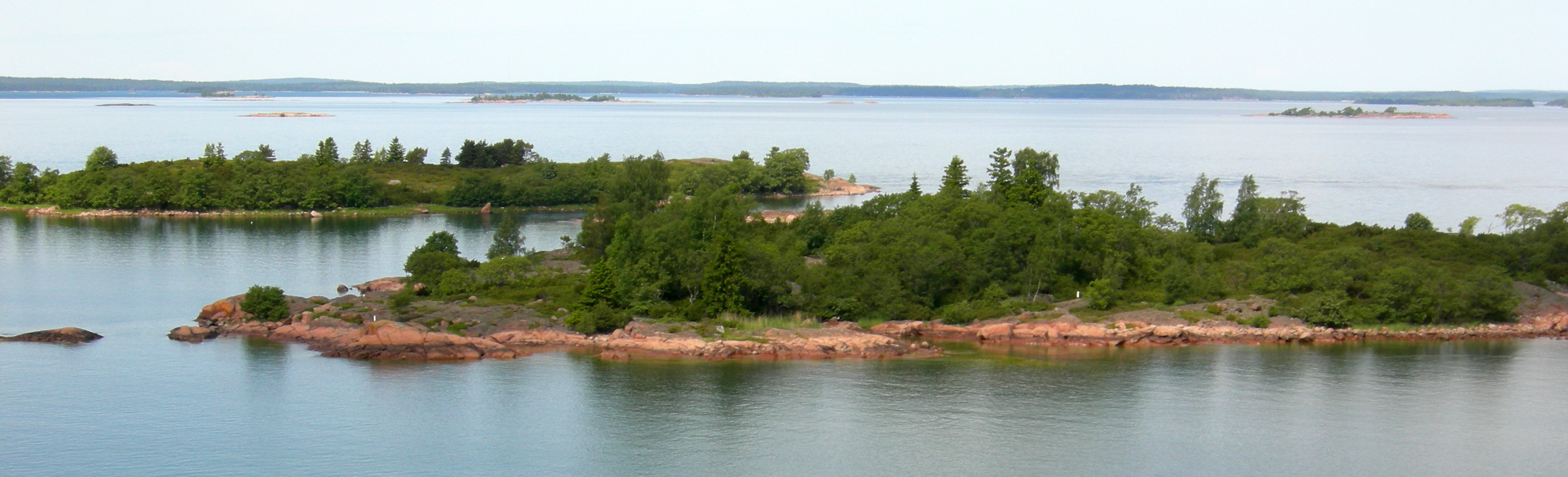
Skerries that form part of Åland, Finland

Passing a skerry off Garibaldi, Oregon, United States

A skerry (/ˈskɛri/ SKERR-ee) is a small rocky island, or islet, usually too small for human habitation. It may simply be a rocky reef. A skerry can also be called a low sea stack.

Skerries may have vegetative life such as moss and small, hardy grasses. They are often used as resting places by animals such as seals and birds.

== Etymology ==
The term skerry is derived from the Old Norse sker, which means a small rocky island in the sea (which in turn derives from the Proto-Indo-European root *sker-, "cut", in the sense of a rock cut off from the land). The Old Norse term sker was brought into the English language via the Scots language word spelled skerrie or skerry. It is a cognate of the Scandinavian languages' words for skerry – Icelandic, Faroese: sker, Danish: skær, Swedish: skär, Norwegian: skjær / skjer, found also in German: Schäre, Finnish: kari, Estonian: skäär, Latvian: šēra, Lithuanian: šcheras and Russian: шхера (shkhera). In Scottish Gaelic, it appears as sgeir, e.g. Sula Sgeir, in Irish as sceir, in Welsh as sgeri, and in Manx as skeyr.

== Formation ==
Skerries are most commonly formed at the outlet of fjords where submerged glacially formed valleys at right angles to the coast join with other cross valleys in a complex array. In some places near the seaward margins of fjorded areas, the ice-scoured channels are so numerous and varied in direction that the rocky coast is divided into thousands of island blocks, some large and mountainous, while others are merely rocky points or rock reefs that menace navigation.

== Examples ==
The island fringe of Norway is such a group of glacially formed skerries, called a skjærgård (sometimes translated into English as archipelago, but specifically one near the coast of the mainland). Many of the cross fjords are so arranged that they parallel the coast and provide a protected channel behind an almost unbroken succession of rocky islands and skerries. By this channel one can travel through a protected passage almost the entire 1,600 km (1,000 mi) route from Stavanger to North Cape, Norway. The Blindleia is a skerry-protected waterway that starts near Kristiansand in southern Norway and continues past Lillesand.

The Inside Passage provides a similar route from Seattle, Washington, to Skagway, Alaska, United States. Another such skerry-protected passage extends from the Straits of Magellan north for 800 km (500 mi) along the west coast of the South American continent.

The Swedish coast along Bohuslän is likewise guarded by skerries. Even the east coast of Sweden, in the Baltic Sea, has many big skärgårdar (archipelagos), notably Stockholm Archipelago.

The southwestern coast of Finland also has a great many skerries; so many, in fact, that they form an archipelago. This area is experiencing post-glacial rebound that connects the rising islands as they break sea level, revealing till deposits and eventually clay bottoms. The skerries exist as small rocky islands before uplift of adjacent terrain changes the classification of this landform into a tombolo.

In the Russian Federation, the best examples are the Minina Skerries, located in the Kara Sea, in the western shores of the Taymyr Peninsula, and the Sumsky Skerries, located in the White Sea.

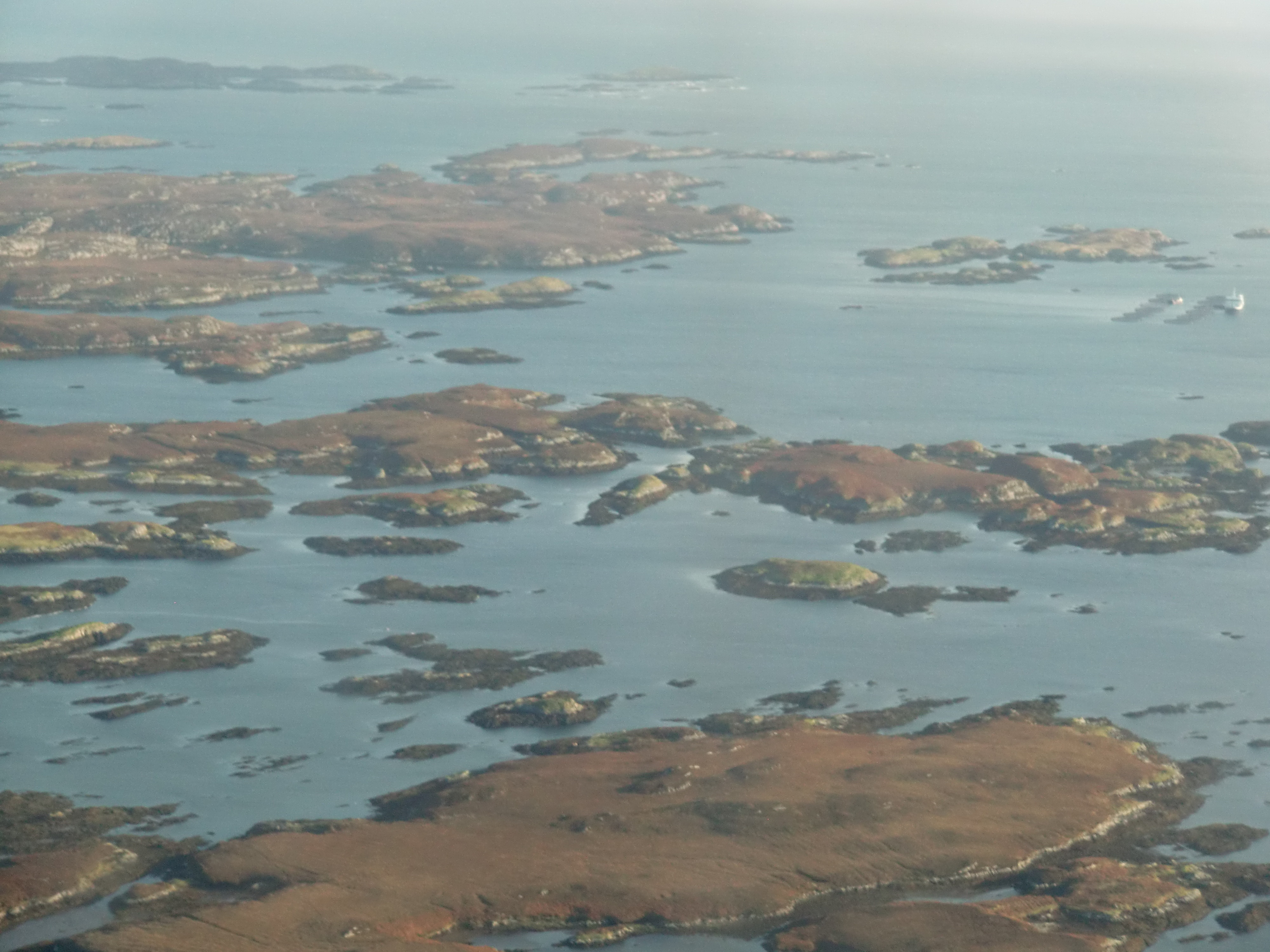
Islets and skerries in Loch Uisgebhagh, east of Benbecula, Outer Hebrides

The United Kingdom has a large number of skerries including Staple Island (an outer Farne Island) in England; a small rocky outcrop near the Fowlsheugh in northeast Scotland; numerous reefs in the Hebrides such as Dubh Artach and Skerryvore; and The Skerries, located off the Antrim coast of Northern Ireland.

Skerries is the name of a coastal area of Dublin, Ireland, with many skerries offshore, including Rockabill, Shenick Island, Colt Island and St Patrick's Island.
