= Onezhsky District =

Onezhsky District Онежский район (Russian)
- District
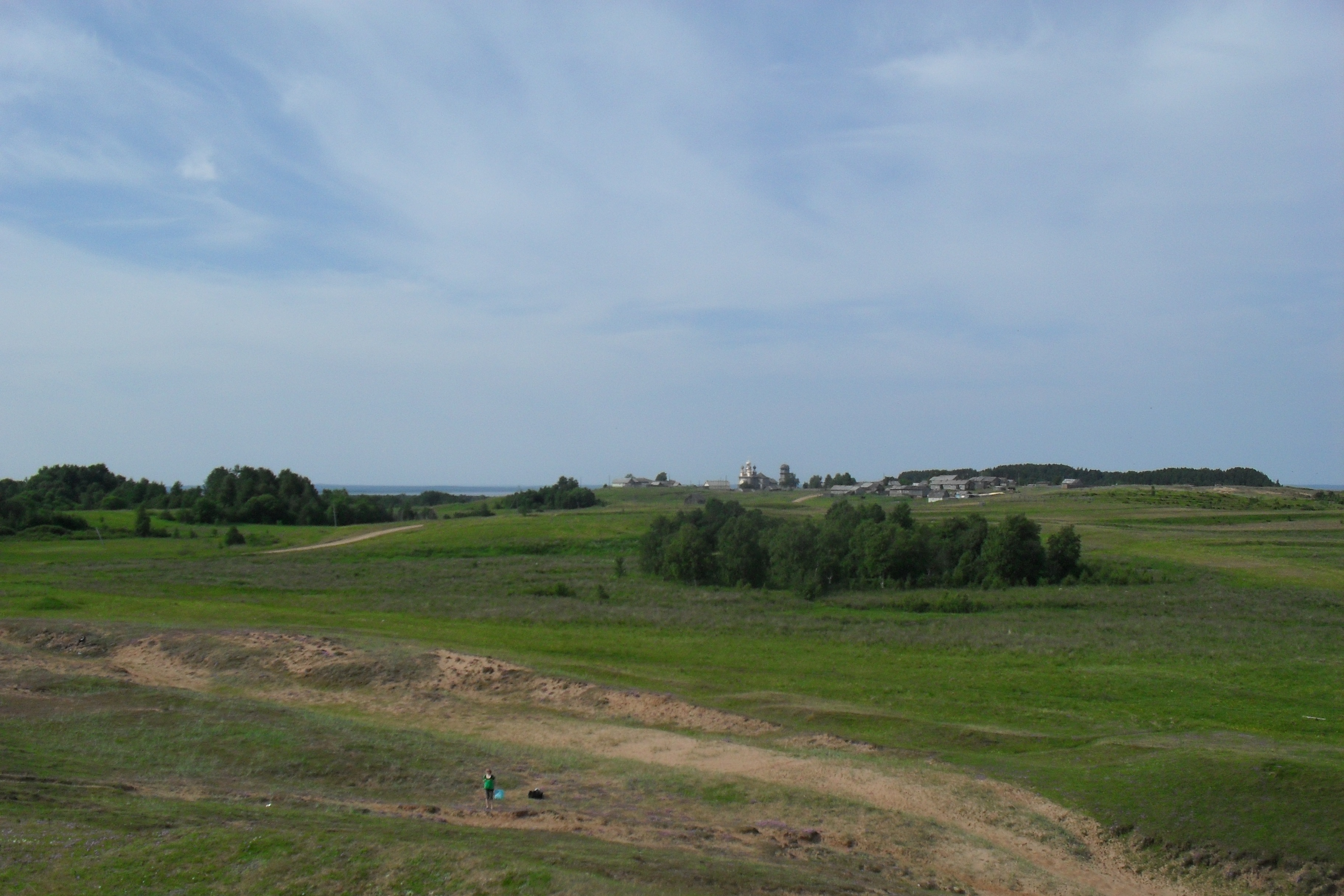
- Landscape near the village of Vorzogory in Onezhsky District

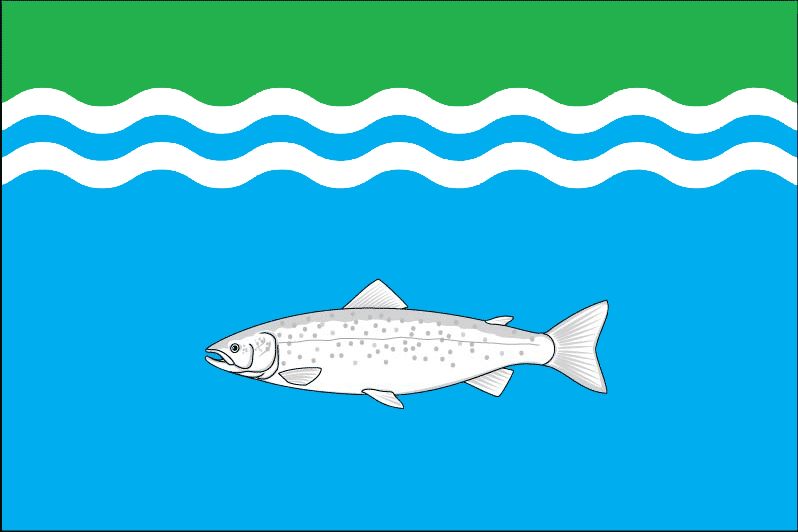
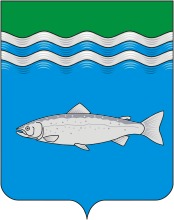
- Flag Coat of arms
- Location of Onezhsky District in Arkhangelsk Oblast
- Coordinates: 63°43′N 37°27′E
- Country: Russia
- Federal subject: Arkhangelsk Oblast
- Established: July 15, 1929
- Administrative center: Onega

Area
  - Total: 23,740 km^{2} (9,170 sq mi)

Population (2010 Census)
  - Total: 14,017
  - Density: 0.5904/km^{2} (1.529/sq mi)
  - Urban: 20.6%
  - Rural: 79.4%

Administrative structure
  - Administrative divisions: 1 Urban-type settlements with jurisdictional territory, 13 Selsoviets
  - Inhabited localities: 1 urban-type settlements, 96 rural localities

Municipal structure
  - Municipally incorporated as: Onezhsky Municipal District
  - Municipal divisions: 2 urban settlements, 6 rural settlements
- Time zone: UTC+3 (MSK)
- OKTMO ID: 11646000
- Website: http://www.onegaland.ru/

Onezhsky District (Russian: Оне́жский райо́н) is an administrative district (raion), one of the twenty-one in Arkhangelsk Oblast, Russia. As a municipal division, it is incorporated as Onezhsky Municipal District. It is located in the northwest of the oblast and borders with Primorsky District in the northeast, Plesetsky District in the southeast, Pudozhsky, Medvezhyegorsky, and Segezhsky Districts of the Republic of Karelia in the southwest, and with Belomorsky District of the Republic of Karelia in the west. In the north, the district is washed by the White Sea. The area of the district is 23,740 square kilometers (9,170 sq mi). Its administrative center is the town of Onega (which is not administratively a part of the district). Population: 14,017 (2010 census); 16,791 (2002 census); 22,269 (1989 Soviet census).

== Geography ==
The district occupies the lower course of the Onega River and the White Sea coast around the Onega Bay, including the western part of the Onega Peninsula (which it shares with Primorsky District). The waters of the district drain into the Onega and the short rivers of the Onega Bay basin. The main tributaries of the Onega within the district limits are the Kodina and the Kozha Rivers. The exception is the southwestern part of the district which lies in the basin of the Ileksa River, a tributary of Lake Vodlozero, in the Baltic Sea basin. The divide between the Arctic and Atlantic Oceans thus runs through the district. There are many lakes throughout the district; the biggest one being Lake Kozhozero, the source of the Kozha, a left tributary of the Onega. The islands in the Onega Bay are also administered by Onezhsky District. The biggest island of the Onega Bay is Kiy Island.

Vodlozersky National Park was established in 1991 in the river valley of the Ileksa to protect the taiga coniferous forests. Since 2001, the National Park has the status of the UNESCO Biosphere Reserve, the first one in Russia. The park is shared between Onezhsky District of Arkhangelsk Oblast and Pudozhsky District of the Republic of Karelia. Another national park, Onezhskoye Pomorye National Park, was open on the Onega Peninsula on 26 February 2013.

== History ==
The area was originally populated by speakers of Uralic languages and then colonized by the Novgorod Republic. It was located on the trading route connecting central and northern Russia, from Moscow to the White Sea along the Onega River. After the fall of Novgorod, the area became a part of the Grand Duchy of Moscow. The descendants of the Novgorod population are the Pomors who inhabit the White Sea coast and traditionally are engaged in fishery. Many localities in the district along the coast, such as Unezhma (now abandoned), have historical significance as old Pomor villages. The western coast of the Onega Bay is known as the Pomor Coast (Pomorsky Bereg).

In the course of the administrative reform carried out in 1708 by Peter the Great, the area was included into Archangelgorod Governorate. In 1780, the governorate was abolished and transformed into Vologda Viceroyalty, and Onega was granted town rights. In 1796, the area was transferred to Arkhangelsk Governorate. The current territory of the district was included into Onezhsky Uyezd. In 1929, several governorates were merged into Northern Krai.

On July 15, 1929, the uyezds were abolished, the governorates merged into Northern Krai, and Onezhsky District was established among others. It became a part of Arkhangelsk Okrug of Northern Krai.

In the following years, the first-level administrative division of Russia kept changing. In 1930, the okrug was abolished, and the district was subordinated to the central administration of Northern Krai. In 1936, the krai was transformed into Northern Oblast. In 1937, Northern Oblast itself was split into Arkhangelsk Oblast and Vologda Oblast. Onezhsky District remained in Arkhangelsk Oblast ever since.

Between July 15, 1929 and July 31, 1931, Chekuyevsky District with the administrative center in the selo of Chekuyevo existed and was a part of Northern Krai. In 1931, the district was abolished, and its area was divided between Plesetsky and Onezhsky Districts.

On December 17, 1940, Belomorsky District was established on the Onega Peninsula, on the areas which previously were parts of Primorsky and Onezhsky Districts. The administrative center of the district was established in the selo of Pertominsk. On September 30, 1958, Belomorsky District was abolished, with its area shared between Primorsky and Onezhsky Districts.

== Administrative and municipal status ==
=== Administrative divisions ===
Within the framework of administrative divisions, Onezhsky District is one of the twenty-one in the oblast. The town of Onega serves as its administrative center, despite being incorporated separately as a town of oblast significance—an administrative unit with the status equal to that of the districts (and which, in addition to Onega, also includes three rural localities). The district is divided into one urban-type settlement with jurisdictional territory (Maloshuyka) and thirteen selsoviets. Two other localities which previously had work settlement status were downgraded to rural localities in 2002; these are Kodino and Mudyuga. The following selsoviets have been established (the administrative centers are given in parentheses):

- Chekuyevsky (Antsiferovsky Bor)
- Khachelsky (Khachela)
- Kodinsky (Kodino)
- Kokorinsky (Porog)
- Mudyuzhsky (Mudyuga)
- Nimengsky (Nimenga)
- Posadny (Posad)
- Priluksky (Priluki)
- Purnemsky (Purnema)
- Sulozersky (Zolotukha)
- Tamitsky (Tamitsa)
- Ust-Kozhsky (Ust-Kozha)
- Vekhneozersky (Vekhneozersky)

=== Municipal divisions ===
As a municipal division, the district is incorporated as Onezhsky Municipal District, with the town of oblast significance of Onega being incorporated within it as Onezhskoye Urban Settlement. The municipal district is divided into two urban settlements and six rural settlements (the administrative centers are given in parentheses):

- Maloshuyskoue Urban Settlement (Maloshuyka)
- Onezhskoye Urban Settlement (Onega)
- Chekuyevskoye Rural Settlement (Antsiferovsky Bor)
- Kodinskoye Rural Settlement (Kodino)
- Nimengskoye Rural Settlement (Nimenga)
- Pokrovskoye Rural Settlement (Pokrovskoye)
- Porozhskoye Rural Settlement (Porog)
- Zolotukhskoye Rural Settlement (Zolotukha)

== Economy ==
=== Industry ===
The economy of the district is based on timber industry. There is also production of construction materials.

=== Agriculture ===
Fishery was a traditional occupation of Pomors on the White Sea coast. There are still two fishing collective farms. Inland, there is production of milk and meat as well as potatoes and vegetables.

=== Transportation ===
The only railway line in the district branches off in Obozerskaya railway station from the railroad between Moscow and Arkhangelsk and runs west to Onega and Belomorsk where it joins the railroad between Petrozavodsk and Murmansk. It was built during World War II to secure the transport of goods from the harbor of Murmansk to central Russia.

Onega is connected to Severodvinsk by a road. There are no all-seasonal roads on the left bank of the Onega River within the district.

The Onega is navigable downstream from the selo of Porog; there is regular passenger navigation. There is also limited passenger service on the Onega Bay.

Onega is served by the Onega Airport which has weekly passenger flights to Arkhangelsk and to the selo of Purnema on the Onega Peninsula.

== Culture and recreation ==
Onezhsky District has a very high concentration of historical, archaeological, and architectural monuments. The district contains thirty-two objects classified as cultural and historical heritage by Russian Federal law, and additionally eighteen objects classified as cultural and historical heritage of local importance. Most of these are wooden churches and chapels.

The monuments classified as historical and architectural heritage are the following:

- the Ascention Church in the village of Kusheretskaya (17th century); has been moved to the Malye Korely open-air museum
- the ensemble of Makaryinsky Pogost (St. Makarius Church, the Church of the Erection of the Cross, and the bell-tower, 17th and 18th century) in the village of Makaryinskaya; burned down in 1985 and no longer exists
- wooden St. Nicholas church in the village of Nizhmozero; burned down in the 1970s
- wooden St. Iliya Church in the village of Vazentsy; destroyed in the 1970s
- the ensemble of Verkhnemudyugsky Pogost (the Church of the Entrance to Jerusalem, the Church of the Tikhvin icon of the Virgin, and the bell-tower, 18th century) in the village of Verkhovye; burned down in 1997 and no longer exists
- the ensemble of the former monastery on Kiy Island
- the ensemble of the Maloshuyka Pogost, consisting of wooden St. Nicholas Church (1638), the Presentation of Jesus at the Temple (1873), and the bell-tower (1825), located in the village of Abramovskaya
- the chapel of the Erection of the Cross (18th century) in the village of Matveyevka
- he chapel of St. George in the village of Nermushi
- the ensemble of the Piyala Pogost, consisting of the Ascension Church (1654) and the bell-tower (1700)
- the ensemble of the Purnema Pogost, consisting of the St. Nicholas Church (1618) and the Nativity Church (1860)
- the ensemble of the Turchasovsky Pogost, consisting of the Transfiguration Church (1786) and the bell-tower (1908)

The most notable wooden churches are triple church ensembles, which consist of two churches (a bigger, unheated, church used in the summer, and a smaller, heated church used in the winter, and a bell-tower). Not more than a dozen of these triple wooden ensembles survived intact, and one of them, the ensemble in the village of Vorzogory, is located in Onezhsky District. Two more, Makaryinsky Pogost and Verkhnemudyugsky Pogost, burned down in 1985 and 1997, respectively.

The Kozheozersky Monastery, founded in 1560, is of great historical value. Nikon, the future patriarch of Moscow and reformer of the Russian Orthodox Church, was an abbot of the monastery from 1643 to 1646. The monastery is located on a peninsula (formerly an island) on Lake Kozhozero and can only be accessed by hiking up the Kozha River for several days.

The only state museum in the district is the Onega Historical Museum.
