= Onega, Russia =

Town in Arkhangelsk Oblast, Russia

Onega Онега
- Town
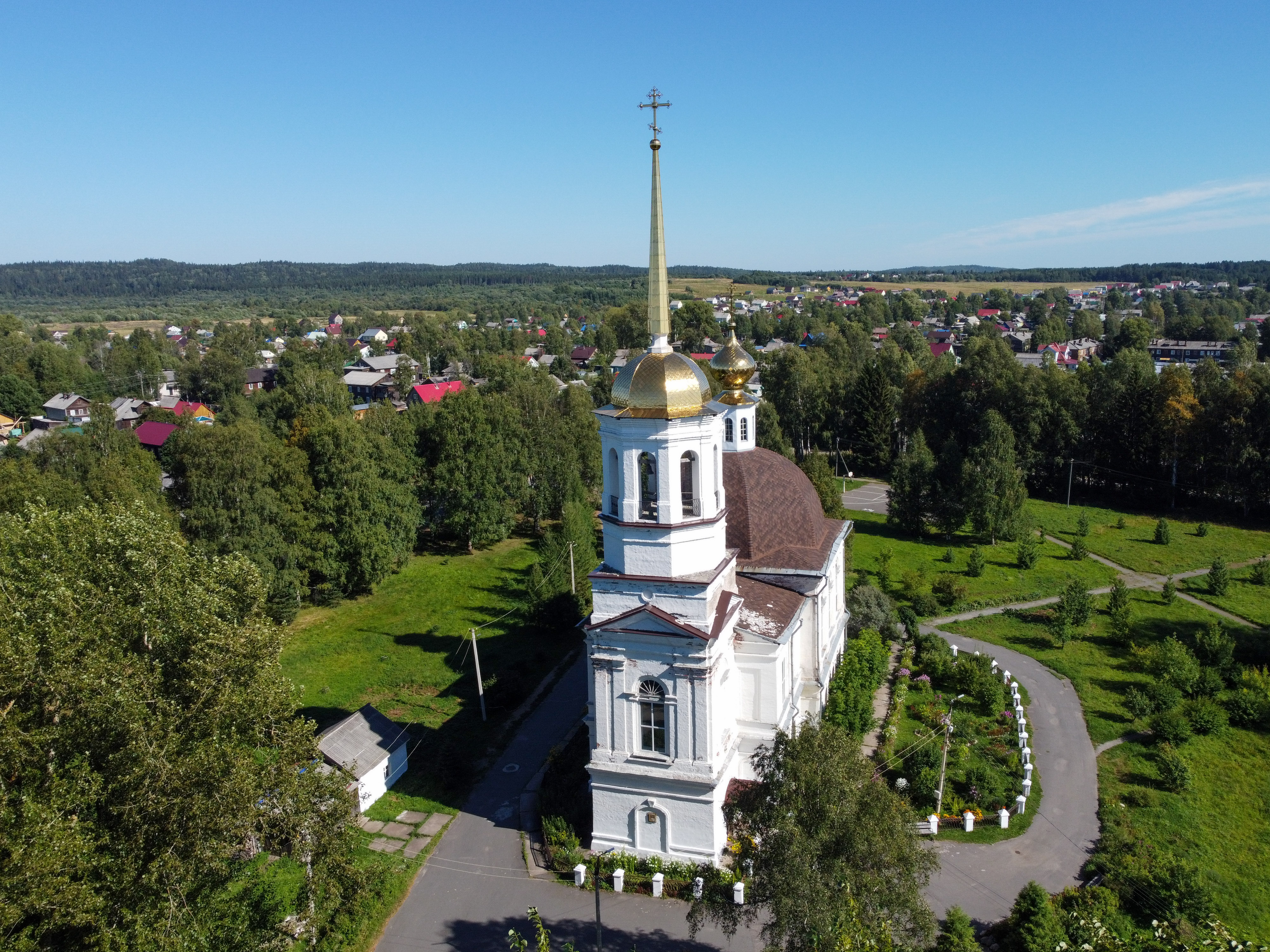
- Holy Trinity Church

- Coat of arms
- Interactive map of Onega
- Location of Onega Onega (Arkhangelsk Oblast)
- Coordinates: 63°55′N 38°05′E
- Country: Russia
- Federal subject: Arkhangelsk Oblast
- First mentioned: 14th century
- Town status since: August 19, 1780
- Elevation: 20 m (66 ft)

Population (2010 Census)
  - Total: 21,359
  - Estimate (2023): 16,449 (−23%)

Administrative status
  - Subordinated to: town of oblast significance of Onega
  - Capital of: town of oblast significance of Onega, Onezhsky District

Municipal status
  - Municipal district: Onezhsky Municipal District
  - Urban settlement: Onezhskoye Urban Settlement
  - Capital of: Onezhsky Municipal District, Onezhskoye Urban Settlement
- Time zone: UTC+3 (MSK)
- Postal code: 164840
- OKTMO ID: 11646101001

Onega (Оне́га) is a town in the northwest of Arkhangelsk Oblast, Russia, situated at the mouth of the Onega River, a few kilometers from the shore of the Onega Bay of the White Sea. Population: 21,359 (2010 census); 23,430 (2002 census); 26,070 (1989 Soviet census).

== History ==
The Pomor village of Ust-Onega (Усть-Оне́га) was first mentioned in Novgorodian documents in the 14th century. In 1699, it was designated as one of the 4 ports in Russia whose exports to Britain were subject to the monopoly enjoyed by the Russia Company. It was chartered on August 19, 1780, after Pyotr Shuvalov had sold his rights to fell timber to English industrialists who built several sawmills there. Since 1784, Onega was the administrative center of Onezhsky Uyezd.

== Administrative and municipal status ==
Within the framework of administrative divisions, Onega serves as the administrative center of Onezhsky District, even though it is not a part of it. As an administrative division, it is, together with three rural localities, incorporated separately as the town of oblast significance of Onega—an administrative unit with the status equal to that of the districts. As a municipal division, the town of oblast significance of Onega is incorporated within Onezhsky Municipal District as Onezhskoye Urban Settlement.

== Economy ==
=== Industry ===
The economy of the town is based on timber industry. There is also production of construction materials.

=== Transportation ===
Onega is a minor port on a bay on the White Sea, which routinely freezes in winter. The town is also served by the Arkhangelsk–Murmansk rail line, which branches off in Obozerskaya railway station from the railroad between Moscow and Arkhangelsk and runs west to Onega and Belomorsk where it joins the railroad between Petrozavodsk and Murmansk. The railroad was built during World War II to secure the transport of goods from the harbor of Murmansk to central Russia.

Onega is connected to Severodvinsk by a road. There are no all-seasonal roads on the left bank of the Onega River.

The Onega is navigable downstream from the selo of Porog; there is regular passenger navigation. There is also limited passenger service on the Onega Bay.

The Onega is served by the Onega Airport which does not have regular flights. Close to the town, there is also an uncompleted military air base, Onega Andozero.

==== Oil transport ====
In 2003, the Russian inland oil shipping company Volgotanker started using the White Sea–Baltic Canal for exporting fuel oil. The scheme involved delivering oil by river tanker, over the canal and into a floating transfer terminal near the Osinki Island in the Onega Bay, 36 km north-west of the port of Onega, for transfer to Latvian seagoing tankers.

On September 1, 2003, a collision between Volgotanker's Nefterudovoz-57M and the Latvian Zoja-I during such a transfer caused an oil spill. As a result, fines were paid, and the company did not get a permit for similar operations in the following year.

As of 2005, plans were in the works, by a different operator (ARM-Nefteservis), to set up oil transfer operations at a floating terminal off Osinki Island again. This time, oil would be delivered by the railway to the Shendunets station nearby, and pumped to the floating terminal by an underwater pipeline.

== Culture and recreation ==
The only state museum in the town is the Onega Historical Museum.

Kiy Island, offshore from Onega, and the surrounding ice fields were used as the location for filming A Captive in the Land in the winter of 1989–1990. The island is the site of a monastery, the Holy Cross Monastery, which was closed during the era of religious persecution by the Soviets.

== Climate ==
Onega has a subarctic climate (Köppen climate classification Dfc) with mild to warm summers with cool nights and long, but not severely cold winters. Precipitation is very reliable year round.

Climate data for Onega
Month	Jan	Feb	Mar	Apr	May	Jun	Jul	Aug	Sep	Oct	Nov	Dec	Year
Record high °C (°F)	6.1 (43.0)	5.3 (41.5)	13.4 (56.1)	25.9 (78.6)	32.5 (90.5)	33.2 (91.8)	35.8 (96.4)	34.4 (93.9)	27.4 (81.3)	19.8 (67.6)	11.1 (52.0)	7.7 (45.9)	35.8 (96.4)
Mean daily maximum °C (°F)	−7.2 (19.0)	−6.3 (20.7)	−0.8 (30.6)	6.0 (42.8)	13.4 (56.1)	18.9 (66.0)	22.2 (72.0)	19.2 (66.6)	13.4 (56.1)	5.6 (42.1)	−0.9 (30.4)	−4.4 (24.1)	6.6 (43.9)
Daily mean °C (°F)	−10.2 (13.6)	−9.6 (14.7)	−4.8 (23.4)	1.4 (34.5)	8.0 (46.4)	13.7 (56.7)	17.1 (62.8)	14.4 (57.9)	9.5 (49.1)	3.2 (37.8)	−3.1 (26.4)	−6.9 (19.6)	2.7 (36.9)
Mean daily minimum °C (°F)	−13.4 (7.9)	−13.0 (8.6)	−8.6 (16.5)	−2.5 (27.5)	3.6 (38.5)	9.0 (48.2)	12.5 (54.5)	10.4 (50.7)	6.4 (43.5)	1.1 (34.0)	−5.3 (22.5)	−9.8 (14.4)	−0.8 (30.6)
Record low °C (°F)	−42.1 (−43.8)	−42.5 (−44.5)	−38.5 (−37.3)	−26.0 (−14.8)	−14.6 (5.7)	−3.4 (25.9)	−0.4 (31.3)	−3.0 (26.6)	−4.9 (23.2)	−19.3 (−2.7)	−32.2 (−26.0)	−41.2 (−42.2)	−42.5 (−44.5)
Average precipitation mm (inches)	44 (1.7)	32 (1.3)	30 (1.2)	28 (1.1)	45 (1.8)	63 (2.5)	74 (2.9)	77 (3.0)	68 (2.7)	69 (2.7)	55 (2.2)	51 (2.0)	636 (25.1)
Average rainy days	3	2	5	10	17	17	17	18	22	19	9	5	144
Average snowy days	26	25	21	13	6	1	0	0.03	1	11	23	27	154
Average relative humidity (%)	84	83	79	72	69	68	72	78	83	87	88	86	79
Mean monthly sunshine hours	21	57	118	188	275	304	308	215	124	58	19	8	1,695
Source 1: Pogoda.ru.net
Source 2: NOAA (sun 1961–1990)

== Notable people ==
Ill-fated young captain, oceanographer and linguist Alexander Kuchin (1888–1913?), was born in Onega. Bolshevik writer Nikolai Bukharin was exiled to Onega in 1911 and left for Germany in 1912.
