= List of shipwrecks in December 1867 =

The list of shipwrecks in December 1867 includes ships sunk, foundered, grounded, or otherwise lost during December 1867.

== 1 December ==
List of shipwrecks: 1 December 1867
Ship	State	Description
Alexander Stewart	United Kingdom	The ship was wrecked at Cemlyn, Anglesey. She was on a voyage from Belfast, County Antrim to Troon, Ayrshire.
Amor	Prussia	The ship, a brigantine or schooner sank in the Gull Stream, off the Goodwin Sands, Kent, United Kingdom. Her eleven crew were rescued by the Ramsgate Lifeboat Bradford ( Royal National Lifeboat Institution). Amor was on her maiden voyage, from Newcastle upon Tyne, Northumberland to Genoa, Italy.
Anna	United Kingdom	The ship was driven ashore and wrecked at Lindisfarne, Northumberland. Her crew were rescued.
Ann McLester	United Kingdom	The barque was abandoned off the North Foreland, Kent. Her crew were rescued by a Deal lugger. Ann McLester was on a voyage from South Shields, County Durham to Cartagena, Spain. She foundered 10 nautical miles (19 km) north east of the Goodwin Sands.
Ant	United Kingdom	The ship was driven ashore and wrecked at Hogsthorpe, Lincolnshire.
Argent	United Kingdom	The brig was driven ashore and wrecked on Wilson's Point, County Down with the loss of one of her six crew. Four of the survivors were rescued by the Coastguard, the fifth swam ashore. She was on a voyage from Ardrossan, Ayrshire to Dublin.
Bayadere, or Bayard	France	The ship, a schooner or barque, was wrecked on Salt Island, Anglesey, United Kingdom. Her fourteen crew were rescued by the Holyhead Lifeboat Princess of Wales ( Royal National Lifeboat Institution). The ship was on a voyage from Liverpool, Lancashire, United Kingdom to "Kesee", on the west coast of Africa.
Bessy	United Kingdom	The brig capsized and sank off the coast of Yorkshire.
Breeze	United Kingdom	The smack was presumed to have foundered in the North Sea with the loss of all hands.
Brothers	United Kingdom	The Mersey Flat was wrecked in Llandudno Bay. Both crew were rescued by the pleasure boat Pilot No. 1 (United Kingdom).
Brothers	United Kingdom	The smack was presumed to have foundered in the North Sea with the loss of all hands.
Chancellor	United Kingdom	The ship was wrecked on the south coast of Crete. She was on a voyage from Alexandria, Egypt to an English port. She had floated off and disappeared before 10 December.
Chester	United Kingdom	The Mersey Flat was driven ashore at Gogarth, Caernarfonshire. Both crew survived.
Christian	United Kingdom	The smack was presumed to have foundered in the North Sea with the loss of all hands.
Clio	United Kingdom	The schooner was driven ashore on Skagen, Denmark. She was on a voyage from Saint Petersburg, Russia to Portsoy, Aberdeenshire.
Constance	France	The ship was run down and sunk by a steamship. Her crew were rescued by the steamship Ousel (United Kingdom). Constance was on a voyage from Dunkirk, Nord to Morlaix, Finistère.
Consul	United Kingdom	The ship caught fire in the Savannah River and was scuttled. She was on a voyage from Savannah, Georgia, United States to Liverpool.
Drie Gebroeders	Netherlands	The fishing bomb collided with the schooner Success (United Kingdom) in the North Sea and was abandoned by her crew, who were rescued by Success.
Don	United Kingdom	The steamship was driven ashore at Weymouth, Dorset. She was refloated and taken into Weymouth.
Edith	United Kingdom	The Mersey Flat was driven ashore and wrecked at Penmaenmawr, Caernarfonshire with the loss of one life. She was on a voyage from Runcorn, Cheshire to Penmaenmawr.
Edward Fairbrass	United Kingdom	The brig was damaged at Whitstable, Kent.
Elizabeth Ferguson	United Kingdom	The brig was driven ashore on Skagen. Her crew were rescued. She was on a voyage from Kronstadt, Russia to London. She had broken up by 10 December.
Erin	United Kingdom	The brig was wrecked on the Clandeboye Rocks, in the Belfast Lough. Her four crew were rescued the next day by the Coastguard. She was on a voyage from Maryport, Cumberland to Newry, County Antrim.
Gem	(United Kingdom of Great Britain and Ireland) Isle of Man	The ship was driven ashore at Thurso Castle, Caithness. Her crew were rescued by rocket apparatus.
Guardian Angel	United Kingdom	The ship was wrecked at Pensaur, Denbighshire with some loss of life. There were at least seven survivors. Eight people were reported missing. She was on a voyage from Liverpool to New York, United States.
Harriet	United Kingdom	The ship was wrecked at Berwick upon Tweed, Northumberland with the loss of all hands.
Helen Knapp	United Kingdom	The brig was driven ashore and wrecked at Dungeness, Kent. Her crew were rescued. She was on a voyage from Nassau, Bahamas to London.
Heroe	United Kingdom	The schooner was driven ashore at North Roe, Shetland Islands.
Highlander	United Kingdom	The schooner was presumed to have foundered in the North Sea with the loss of all hands.
John and Sarah	United Kingdom	The ship departed from departed from Lowestoft, Suffolk for Newcastle upon Tyne. No further trace, presumed foundered with the loss of all hands.
Joseph	United Kingdom	The barge was run into by the steamship Killingworth (United Kingdom) and sank in the River Thames with the loss of all three people on board.
Lorena	United Kingdom	The ship struck a rock and was holed. She was on a voyage from Liverpool to Rangoon, Burma. She was taken into Diamond Island, Burma in a leaky condition.
Lydia Williams	United Kingdom	The full-rigged ship was driven ashore and wrecked on Salt Island. All 34 people on board were rescued by the Holyhead Lifeboat Princess of Wales ( Royal National Lifeboat Institution). Lydia Williams was on a voyage from Liverpool to San Francisco, California, United States. She was refloated on 27 March 1868 and towed into Holyhead.
Margaret	United Kingdom	The brig was driven ashore 9 nautical miles (17 km) east of Dunbar, Lothian. Her crew were rescued by rocket apparatus. She was on a voyage from South Shields, County Durham to Leith, Lothian.
Mary Ann	United Kingdom	The smack was run into by the schooner Hero (United Kingdom) and was abandoned in the North Sea off the coast of Suffolk. Her nine crew were rescued by Hero. She subsequently foundered.
Maximilian	United States	The barque was driven ashore at Zouteland, Zeeland, Netherlands.
Merry Maid	United Kingdom	The smack was driven ashore at Torquay, Devon. Her crew were rescued.
Monarch	United Kingdom	The sloop was wrecked in the Humber 1 nautical mile (1.9 km) west of Stone Creek. She was on a voyage from Ipswich to Howden, Yorkshire.
Morfa Mawr, and Prairie Bird	United Kingdom	The ships collided off the Deadman Point, Cornwall and both foundered. All four crew from Morfa Mawr and eight crew from Prairie Bird were rescued by the steamship Little Western (United Kingdom). The schooner Morfa Mawr was on a voyage from Port Talbot, Glamorgan to Plymouth, Devon. Prairie Bird was on a voyage from Cardiff, Glamorgan to Naples, Italy.
Nancy Rose	United Kingdom	The seine boat was driven ashore and wrecked at Newquay, Cornwall.
Precepton	United Kingdom	The schooner was presumed to have foundered in the North Sea with the loss of all hands.
Queen	Trinity House	The pilot cutter was driven ashore and wrecked at Dymchurch, Kent with the loss of one of her five crew. Survivors were rescued by the Littlestone Lifeboat Providence ( Royal National Lifeboat Institution).
Queen	United Kingdom	The ship was driven ashore at King's Lynn, Norfolk. She was refloated.
Queen of the Plym	United Kingdom	The ship was wrecked at "Kerisoe", Finistère, France. She was on a voyage from Galaţi, Ottoman Empire to Plymouth.
Raydiff	United Kingdom	The schooner was driven ashore at Penmaenmawr with the loss of one life.
Resolute	United Kingdom	The smack was presumed to have foundered in the North Sea with the loss of all hands.
Scotland	United Kingdom	The schooner was driven onto the breakwater and wrecked at Holyhead, Anglesey with the loss of two of her five crew. She was on a voyage from Chester, Cheshire to Swansea, Glamorgan, or from the River Duddon to Chester.
Sir Richard Jackson	United Kingdom	The ship was driven ashore at Boulby, Yorkshire.
Solferino	United Kingdom	The schooner was driven ashore and sank at Donaghadee, County Down. Her crew survived.
Stanley	United Kingdom	The brig was presumed to have foundered in the North Sea with the loss of all hands.
Therese	United Kingdom	The steamship departed from Grangemouth, Stirlingshire for Rotterdam, South Holland, Netherlands. Subsequently sighted off the coast of Northumberland; presumed foundered with the loss of all hands.
Thetis	United Kingdom	The smack was presumed to have foundered in the North Sea with the loss of all hands.
Van Cook	Royal National Lifeboat Institution	The Walmer Lifeboat capsized whilst going to the aid of Amor (Prussia) with the loss of a crew member. She was towed back to Deal by a lugger.
Victoria	United Kingdom	The sloop ran aground on Scroby Sands, Norfolk. She was on a voyage from Rochester, Kent to Goole, Yorkshire. She was refloated and assisted into Great Yarmouth, Norfolk.
Vitreous, Vitruving, or Vitruvius	United Kingdom	The ship, a brigantine or schooner, was driven ashore at Portrush, County Antrim. Her six crew were rescued by the Portrush Lifeboat Zelinda ( Royal National Lifeboat Institution). The ship was on a voyage from Londonderry to Dublin or Maryport, Cumberland.
Unnamed	United Kingdom	The collier was driven ashore at Whitburn, County Durham.
Unnamed	United States	The ship ran aground on the Goodwin Sands. She was refloated with the assistance of a tug.
Unnamed	United Kingdom	The schooner were driven ashore and wrecked at Holyhead.
Unnamed	United Kingdom	The steamship foundered in the Belfast Lough. She was on a voyage from the Clyde to Buenos Aires, Argentina.
Unnamed	United Kingdom	The sloop foundered in the Belfast Lough off Ballymacormack Point with the loss of all hands.
Unnamed	United Kingdom	The schooner was driven ashore at Portrush, County Antrim.
Unnamed	United Kingdom	The schooner was wrecked at Portballintrae, County Antrim.
Unnamed	United Kingdom	The pilot boat, a yawl, was abandoned off Carlingford, County Louth. Her six crew were rescued by the brigantine Cygnet (United Kingdom).
Unnamed	United Kingdom	The ship was wrecked at Berwick upon Tweed with the loss of all hands.
Unnamed	United Kingdom	The fishing boat was lost with the loss of both crew. She was on a voyage from Sunderland to Newton, Northumberland.
Unnamed	United Kingdom	The pilot boat was driven ashore at Clovelly, Devon. Her crew were rescued.
Unnamed	United Kingdom	The schooner was driven ashore at Dieppe, Seine-Inférieure, France.

== 2 December ==
List of shipwrecks: 2 December 1867
Ship	State	Description
Alna	Russia	The schooner was driven ashore at Calais, France. She was on a voyage from Cádiz, Spain to Leith, Lothian. She was consequently condemned.
Ann	United Kingdom	The ship collided with the Yorkshire Billyboy Providence (United Kingdom) off "Wallingborough" and was abandoned by her crew, who were rescued by Providence. Ann was on a voyage from Castleford, Yorkshire to Wisbech, Cambridgeshire. She was taken into Grimsby, Lincolnshire.
Ann Gibson	United Kingdom	The schooner was driven ashore in Sandend Bay, 8 nautical miles (15 km) west of Banff, Aberdeenshire. Her crew were rescued. She was on a voyage from Newcastle upon Tyne, Northumberland to "Repock Ferry".
Ben Brace	United Kingdom	The ship was driven ashore and wrecked at Abermawr, Pembrokeshire with the loss of a crew member. She was on a voyage from Dublin to Maryport, Cumberland.
Catherine	United Kingdom	The smack was driven ashore on Caldy Island, Pembrokeshire. She was refloated on 7 December.
Cognac Packet	United Kingdom	The ship was driven ashore at Bridlington, Yorkshire. Her crew were rescued. She was on a voyage from London to South Shields, County Durham.
Courrier du Nord	France	The brig was driven ashore and wrecked at St. Ives, Cornwall, United Kingdom with the loss of six of her eight crew. Survivors were rescued by the St. Ives Lifeboat. She was on a voyage from Swansea, Glamorgan, United Kingdom to Algiers, Algeria.
Cuirasseier	France	The steamship was driven ashore at Cleethorpes, Lincolnshire.
Diligence	United Kingdom	The ship was driven ashore at Bridlington. Her crew were rescued. She was on a voyage from Lowestoft, Suffolk to Seaham, County Durham.
Duchess	United Kingdom	The brig foundered off Deadman Point, Cornwall. Her crew were rescued. She was on a voyage from Llanelly, Glamorgan to Harfleur, Seine-Inférieure, France.
Enigheden	Norway	The brig was abandoned in the North Sea with the loss of a crew member. Survivors were rescued by Malvina (Denmark). Enigheden was on a voyage from Torbay to Leith. She was towed into Grangemouth, Stirlingshire, United Kingdom in a derelict condition on 9 December.
Enterprise	United Kingdom	The ship was wrecked on the Whiting Sand, in the North Sea. She was on a voyage from Marseille, Bouches-du-Rhône, France to King's Lynn, Norfolk.
Erin	United Kingdom	The ship was driven ashore and wrecked in the Belfast Lough. Her crew were rescued. She was on a voyage from Dublin to Belfast, County Antrim.
Enyo	United Kingdom	The schooner was wrecked at Bridlington with the loss of all hands.
Euroclydon	United Kingdom	The brig ran aground on the Corton Sand, in the North Sea off the coast of Suffolk. She was on a voyage from Sunderland, County Durham to London. She was refloated with assistance from the tug Rainbow (United Kingdom) and taken into Lowestoft in a leaky condition.
Eva	United Kingdom	The ship sank off Ameland, Friesland, Netherlands. She was on a voyage from Hamburg to Aberdeen.
Fanny Slater	United Kingdom	The ship was driven ashore and wrecked 2 nautical miles (3.7 km) west of the Point of Ayre, Isle of Man.
Fearnought	United Kingdom	The diving cutter was run into by another diving cutter and sank off Whitstable, Kent.
Fly	United Kingdom	The schooner was abandoned in the North Sea with the loss of two of her four crew. Survivors were rescued by the smack Monarch (United Kingdom), which lost a crew member effecting the rescue. Fly was on a voyage from London to Newcastle upon Tyne. She was taken into the Nieuwe Diep in a derelict condition on 6 December.
Forester	United Kingdom	The ship was driven ashore and severely damaged at Calais, France. Her crew were rescued. She was on a voyage from Rotterdam, South Holland, Netherlands to Swansea.
George Waters	United Kingdom	The ship was driven ashore and wrecked at Cemaes Bay, Anglesey/ She was on a voyage from Liverpool, Lancashire to Santander, Spain.
Grecian Queen	United Kingdom	The barque ran aground on the Shipwash Sand, in the North Sea off the coast of Suffolk. She was refloated and assisted into Harwich, Essex.
Harriet, or Hornet	United Kingdom	The ship was abandoned at Bridlington. She was on a voyage from Newhaven, Sussex to Sunderland.
Hastings	United Kingdom	The brig was driven ashhore near Holyhead, Anglesey with the loss of four of her crew.
Heedful	United Kingdom	The schooner was driven ashore on the Goodwick Sands, Pembrokeshire. Her crew were rescued by the Goodwick Lifeboat. she was on a voyage from the River Duddon to Cardiff, Glamorgan.
Hero	United Kingdom	The schooner was driven ashore at Sheringham, Norfolk. Three crew were rescued by the Sheringham Lifeboat. She was on a voyage from Colchester, Essex to Newcastle upon Tyne. She had become a wreck by 4 December.
Hellens	United Kingdom	The sloop was wrecked at Buckie, Banffshire. Her four crew were rescued by the Buckie Lifeboat. She was on a voyage from Bo'ness, Lothian to Scrabster, Caithness.
Henrietta	United States	The barque was driven ashore at Appledore, Devon, United Kingdom.
Home	United Kingdom	The barque was driven ashore and wrecked at Withernsea, Yorkshire. Her eleven crew were rescued by rocket apparatus. She was on a voyage from Antwerp, Belgium to South Shields.
Isabella	United Kingdom	The ship was destroyed by fire at Magheramorne, County Antrim.
Ivanhoe	United Kingdom	The steamship was sighted off the coast of Northumberland. She was on a voyage from Leith to Rotterdam. No further trace, presumed foundered with the loss of all hands.
James Bowles	United Kingdom	The Thames barge was driven ashore at Westgate-on-Sea, Kent. She was on a voyage from London to Shoreham-by-Sea, Sussex.
Jeune Adeline	France	The schooner was driven ashore and wrecked 3 nautical miles (5.6 km) west of Bideford, Devon. Her six crew were rescued. She was on a voyage from Saint-Malo, Ille-et-Vilaine to Bristol, Gloucestershire, United Kingdom.
Julius	Prussia	The barque ran aground on the Shipwash Sand. She was refloated and assisted into Harwich in a waterlogged condition.
Lady Louisa Stewart	United Kingdom	The schooner capsized and sank off Lindisfarne, Northumberland with the loss of all hands.
Liberty	United Kingdom	The ship was damaged by fire in Lochfeachan.
Little Rose	United Kingdom	The fishing smack was driven ashore and wrecked at Margate, Kent.
Lord Warden	United Kingdom	The sloop was driven ashore at Whitstable.
Marie	France	The ship was driven ashore and wrecked at Mardyk, Nord. Her crew were rescued. She was on a voyage from Saint-Brieuc, Côtes-du-Nord to Ipswich, Suffolk, United Kingdom.
Mary	United Kingdom	The ship was run into and sank at Whitstable.
Mary Jane, and Progress	United Kingdom; Belgium	The schooner Mary Jane collided with the barque Progress and was abandoned off the coast of East Riding of Yorkshire. Her crew were rescued. She was on a voyage from Great Yarmouth, Norfolk to Anstruther, Fife. Progress was consequently run ashore at Bridlington. Her crew were rescued. She was on a voyage from Antwerp to St. Davids, Pembrokeshire, United Kingdom.
Mayflower	United Kingdom	The ship was driven ashore at Tankerton, Kent.
Minerva	United Kingdom	The ship was wrecked on Scroby Sands, Norfolk with the loss of a crew member. She was on a voyage from Hull, Yorkshire to Newcastle upon Tyne.
Naomi	United Kingdom	The brigantine ran aground on the Barnard Sand, in the North Sea off the coast of Suffolk. She was refloated and assisted into Lowestoft, Suffolk by the Kessingland Lifeboat Grace and Lally ( Royal National Lifeboat Institution).
Paquebot No. 3	France	The lugger was driven ashore and wrecked 3 nautical miles (5.6 km) west of Bideford with the loss of all on board, more than six lives.
Pearl	United Kingdom	The paddle tug foundered off Tynemouth, Northumberland with the loss of all four crew.
Peter Joynson	United States	The ship was driven ashore at Cuxhaven. She was on a voyage from Bremerhaven to New Orleans, Louisiana. She was refloated.
Raphael	United Kingdom	The ship was driven ashore at Hela, Prussia. She was on a voyage from Königsberg, Prussia to London. She was refloated and taken into Danzig in a leaky condition.
Rescuer	United Kingdom	The Gorleston lifeboat was run into by the lugger James and Ellen (United Kingdom) and capsized with the loss of 26 of the 33 people on board. Survivors were rescued by the tug Andrew Woodhouse (United Kingdom).
Saleptner	Denmark	The ship was driven ashore at Voerså. She was refloated on 14 May 1868 with assistance from the steamship Hertha (Denmark) and taken into Fredrikshavn.
Sally	United Kingdom	The ship was driven ashore at Tankerton.
Sandford	United Kingdom	The brigantine was wrecked in Mertheve Bay, Cornwall with the loss of all hands.
Scotia	United Kingdom	The steamship ran aground on the Krau Sand, in the North Sea. She was on a voyage from Leith, Lothian to Hamburg. She was refloated with assistance from the steamship Assecuradeur (Hamburg).
Sir Richard Jackson	United Kingdom	The barque was driven ashore at Boulby, Yorkshire. Her crew were rescued by rocket apparatus. She was on a voyage from Cartagena, Spain to South Shields.
Sovereign	United Kingdom	The ship sprang a leak was abandoned in the North Sea. Her crew were rescued by the steamship William Cochrane (United Kingdom).
St. Brannich	United Kingdom	The brigantine was driven ashore on Looe Island, Cornwall. She was on a voyage from Havre de Grâce, Seine-Inférieure to Runcorn, Cheshire. She was refloated with assistance from the Looe Lifeboat Oxfordshire ( Royal National Lifeboat Institution) and assisted into Looe in a severely leaky condition.
Sultana	United Kingdom	The brig was wrecked on the Newcombe Sand, in the North Sea off the coast of Suffolk. Her crew were rescued by the steamship Middlesborough (United Kingdom). She was on a voyage from Sunderland to London.
Swan	United Kingdom	The schooner was abandoned in the North Sea off the coast of Suffolk. Her crew were rescued by the smack Anenome (United Kingdom). Swan was on a voyage from London to Newcastle upon Tyne.
Texian	United Kingdom	The ship was driven ashore at Musselburgh, Lothian. Her crew were rescued. She was on a voyage from Newburgh, Fife to Arbroath, Forfarshire.
Tover, and Traveller	United Kingdom	The Yorkshire Billyboy Traveller and the schooner Tover collided at Grimsby and were both severely damaged.
Urgent	United Kingdom	The ship was driven ashore in Bangor Bay with the loss of a crew member. She was on a voyage from Troon, Ayrshire to Portaferry, County Down.
Volunteer	United Kingdom	The ship ran aground on the Gunfleet Sand, in the North Sea off the coast of Suffolk and was abandoned by her crew. She was on a voyage from Burnham-on-Crouch, Essex to Sunderland.
Unnamed	Flag unknown	The brig was wrecked near Whitstable with the loss of three lives.
Unnamed	United Kingdom	The steamboat sank in the River Mersey.
Unnamed	United Kingdom	The schooner was wrecked on the Whiting Sand, in the North Sea off the coast of Norfolk.
Unnamed	United Kingdom	The ship was wrecked in Bridlington Bay with the loss of two of her crew.
Unnamed	United Kingdom	The barque was driven ashore at Sea Palling, Norfolk.
Two unnamed vessels	Flags unknown	The ships were driven ashore at Sea Palling.
Unnamed	United Kingdom	The brig was wrecked on Scroby Sands, Norfolk. Her seventeen crew were rescued by the Gorleston Lifeboat Rescuer (United Kingdom).
Unnamed	United Kingdom	The steamship ran aground on the Maplin Sand, in the North Sea off the coast of Essex.
Unnamed	Flag unknown	The steamship foundered 15 nautical miles (28 km) north by west of Skagen.

== 3 December ==
List of shipwrecks: 3 December 1867
Ship	State	Description
Activ	Prussia	The ship was driven ashore south of Fredrikshavn, Denmark. She was on a voyage from Randers, Denmark to Leith, Lothian, United Kingdom.
Africa	Stralsund	The brig was driven ashore at Lowestoft, Suffolk, United Kingdom. Her crew were rescued by rocket apparatus. She was on a voyage from Linden, Prussia to Newcastle upon Tyne, Northumberland, United Kingdom. Africa was refloated on 30 December and taken into Lowestoft.
Anna and Maria	United Kingdom	The ship ran aground and sank at Anholt, Denmark. She was on a voyage from Stettin to Grangemouth, Stirlingshire.
Ariadne	United Kingdom	The ship was driven ashore at Rønne, Denmark. She was on a voyage from Gävle, Sweden to Hartlepool, County Durham. She was refloated and taken into Harburg.
Aunt	United Kingdom	The ship was driven ashore and wrecked at Ingoldmells, Lincolnshire. Two crew were rescued by the Skegness Lifeboat Herbert Ingram ( Royal National Lifeboat Institution). Aunt was on a voyage from Boston, Lincolnshire to Goole, Yorkshire.
Avik	Sweden	The ship was driven ashore and wrecked near Thisted, Denmark with the loss of all hands. She was on a voyage from South Shields, County Durham to Gothenburg.
Clarinda	United Kingdom	The brig was driven ashore at Ingoldmells. Her seven crew were rescued by the Sutton Lifeboat Birmingham No. 1 ( Royal National Lifeboat Institution). Clarinda was on a voyage from Ostend, West Flanders, Belgium to Sunderland, County Durham.
Elizabeth	United Kingdom	The ship was driven ashore at Wainfleet, Lincolnshire.
Eranz	Denmark	The ship was driven ashore near Fredrikshavn. She was on a voyage from Aarhus to an English port. She was refloated on 19 December and taken into Fredrikshavn.
Esk	United Kingdom	The schooner was driven ashore at Donna Nook, Lincolnshire. Her six crew were rescued by the Donna Nook Lifeboat North Briton ( Royal National Lifeboat Institution). Esk was on a voyage from Hull, Yorkshire to Sunderland.
George Kendall	United Kingdom	The full-rigged ship was wrecked on the Cross Sand, in the North Sea off the coast of Norfolk with the loss of nineteen of her 23 crew. She was on a voyage from Liverpool, Lancashire to Hull. She was taken into Gravesend, Kent on 6 December.
Hannah	United Kingdom	The sloop was driven ashore and wrecked at Spittal, Northumberland with the loss of all hands.
Henriette	France	The lugger was driven ashore at Roscoff, Finistère. Her crew were rescued. She was on a voyage from Grangemouth to Lorient, Morbihan.
Humboldt	United States	The ship was driven ashore on Vlieland, Friesland, Netherlands. She was on a voyage from Baltimore, Maryland to Amsterdam, North Holland, Netherlands.
Iddo	United Kingdom	The brig ran aground on the Barnard Sand in the North Sea off the coast of Suffolk and sank with the loss of five of her crew. She was on a voyage from West Hartlepool, County Durham to London.
Jane Alice	United Kingdom	The ship was wrecked on the Île de Batz, Finistère, France with the loss of two of her crew.
Jane and Margaret	United Kingdom	The schooner was driven ashore at Cromer, Norfolk. Her crew were rescued.
Jane	United Kingdom	The brig was assisted into Lowestoft, where she sank. She was on a voyage from London to South Shields, County Durham.
Laura	United Kingdom	The ship was driven ashore at Lowestoft. She was on a voyage from London to Sunderland. She was refloated on 5 December and towed into Lowestoft.
Lena	United Kingdom	The brigantine was driven ashore at Lowestoft. Her crew were rescued. She was on a voyage from Sunderland to London. She was later refloated and taken into Lowestoft.
Mary	United Kingdom	The smack collided with another vessel and was driven ashore at Warham, Norfolk .
Mary Ann	United Kingdom	The schooner was driven ashore at Donna Nook. Her crew were rescued by the Donna Nook Lifeboat North Briton ( Royal National Lifeboat Institution). Mary Ann was on a voyage from Southend, Essex to Hull.
Menadora	United Kingdom	The brigantine was driven ashore at Lowestoft. Two crew were rescued by the Pakefield Lifeboat. She was on a voyage from Hartlepool to London. Menadora was refloated on 6 December and taken into Lowestoft.
Menot	United Kingdom	The ship was driven ashore at Lowestoft. She was on a voyage from Hartlepool to London.
Minnehaha	United States	The clipper was wrecked at Baker's Island. Her crew survived.
Nouvelle Hortense	France	The ship was driven ashore at Calais. She was on a voyage from Africa to London.
Ormesby Hall	United Kingdom	The schooner was driven ashore and wrecked at Brancaster, Norfolk. Her crew were rescued.
Perseverance	United Kingdom	The ship ran aground off Pakefield, Suffolk. She was on a voyage from South Shields to London. She was refloated and taken into Lowestoft in a leaky condition.
Phœbe	United Kingdom	The ship was driven ashore and wrecked at Winterton-on-Sea, Norfolk with the loss of two lives. She was on a voyage from Rochester, Kent to Goole, Yorkshire.
Queen Adelaide	United Kingdom	The ship was discovered derelict off Lowestoft. She was taken into Lowestoft by the smack Monarch (United Kingdom).
Queen Victoria	United Kingdom	The brig was wrecked on the Barnard Sand, in the North Sea off the coast of Suffolk with the loss of all but one of her eight crew. The survivor was rescued by the Pakefield Lifeboat.
Rambler	United Kingdom	The barque ran aground at Dover, Kent. She was on a voyage from the Black Sea to Antwerp, Belgium.
Smyrna	United Kingdom	The steamship was abandoned in the North Sea 40 nautical miles (74 km) off the Dutch coast. More than 25 crew were rescued by a number of smacks, including Champion Trawler and William and Eliza (both United Kingdom). Her captain and his son remained aboard, but were later taken off. Smyrna was on a voyage from Odesa, Russia to Hull. She was towed into Brouwershaven, Zeeland, Netherlands on 9 December by the steamships Ravensbury and Waterloo (both United Kingdom). Subsequently repaired and returned to service.
Sophia	United Kingdom	The schooner was driven ashore 1 nautical mile (1.9 km) north of Winterton-on-Sea, Norfolk with the loss of at least one life. Two crew were rescued by the Winterton Lifeboat Anna Maria ( Royal National Lifeboat Institution). Sophia was on a voyage from Colchester, Essex to Tynemouth, Northumberland.
Superior	United Kingdom	The schooner was abandoned off the Dudgeon Sand, in the North Sea. Her six crew were rescued by the brig Kinburn (United Kingdom), which lost a crew member effecting the rescue. She was towed into the Humber in a derelict condition the next day by Thames (United Kingdom).
Vrow Gysbertha	Netherlands	The hoon was driven ashore at Sea Palling, Norfolk. Her crew were rescued.
Winchester	United Kingdom	The steamship ran aground on the Lillesand, in the Baltic Sea off Torekov, Sweden with the loss of nine of her crew. There were at least three survivors. She was consequently condemned.
Zwaantje Dost	Prussia	The galiot ran aground on the Tongue Sand and was abandoned. Her crew got on board the Princess Middle Lightship ( Trinity House) but later reboarded her. Zwaantje Dost was on a voyage from Kiel to London. She was subsequently towed into Margate, Kent.
Gorleston Lifeboat	United Kingdom	The lifeboat capsized at Great Yarmouth, Norfolk.
Unnamed	Flag unknown	The schooner was wrecked on the Brake Sand with the loss of all hands.
Unnamed	United Kingdom	The schooner was driven ashore at Snettisham, Norfolk.
Two unnamed vessels	United Kingdom	A schooner and another vessel ran aground on the Hall Sand, in the North Sea off the coast of Lincolnshire.
Unnamed	United Kingdom	The brig was driven ashore at Cemyln, Anglesey with the loss of a crew member.
'Unnamed	United Kingdom	The Yorkshire Billyboy was driven ashore at Skegness, Lincolnshire. Both crew were rescued by the Skegness Lifeboat Herbert Ingram ( Royal National Lifeboat Institution).

== 4 December ==
List of shipwrecks: 4 December 1867
Ship	State	Description
Admiral	United Kingdom	The ship was driven ashore on Terschelling, Friesland, Netherlands. She was on a voyage from Jamaica to Hamburg.
Augusta	Norway	The schooner was abandoned in the North Sea 35 nautical miles (65 km) off Tynemouth Castle, Northumberland, United Kingdom. Her four crew were rescued by the steamship Anne Smith (United Kingdom).
Betsey	United Kingdom	The derelict ship was taken into the Nieuw Diep by the steamship Minister (Netherlands).
Betsy	United Kingdom	The smack was abandoned in the North Sea. Her crew were rescued by the smack John Cooper (United Kingdom).
Como	United Kingdom	The schooner was driven ashore at Tolstrup, Denmark. Two crew were rescued. She was on a voyage from South Shields, County Durham to Copenhagen, Denmark.
Derwent	United Kingdom	The brig collided with a steamship and was abandoned by her crew. She came ashore at Corone, Greece.
Janets	United Kingdom	The ship was wrecked near Höganäs, Sweden. She was on a voyage from Sunderland, County Durham to Helsingør, Denmark.
Jehu	United Kingdom	The brig was driven ashore in the Gut of Canso.
Johan Christo	Prussia	The ship was wrecked at Bremen.
John Traubman	United Kingdom	The ship sank in the Larne Lough. She was on a voyage from Skerries, County Dublin to Londonderry.
Knuttringborg	Denmark	The schooner was driven ashore near Ebeltoft. She was on a voyage from Bandholm to an English port.
Lady Louisa Stewart	United Kingdom	The ship sank at Holyhead, Anglesey.
Laura	Denmark	The galiot was driven ashore and wrecked on Læsø with the loss of two of her five crew. She was on a voyage from Anklam, Prussia to Leith, Lothian, United Kingdom.
Lima	United Kingdom	The barque was driven ashore on Læsø.
Louisa	Belgium	The ship was abandoned in the Dogger Bank with the loss of two of her six crew. She was on a voyage from Antwerp to Grangemouth, Stirlingshire, United Kingdom.
Louise	Denmark	The galiot was driven ashore on the west coast of Jutland.
May	United Kingdom	The brig was abandoned in the North Sea. Her crew were rescued.
Mildmay	United Kingdom	The barque was abandoned in the North Sea off Flamborough Head, Yorkshire with the loss of her captain. She was on a voyage from Portsmouth, Hampshire to Seaham, County Durham.
Monarch	United Kingdom	The ship was driven ashore near Hull. Yorkshire.
Moses	Norway	The derelict galiot was discovered in the North Sea 90 nautical miles (170 km) off Tynemouth, Northumberland by the steamship Stafford (United Kingdom). She was towed into South Shields.
Penguin	France	The ship was driven ashore at Dunkirk, Nord. She was on a voyage from Marseille, Bouches-du-Rhône to Dunkirk.
Perseverance	United Kingdom	The ship was driven ashore. She was on a voyage from South Shields, County Durham to London. She was refloated and taken into Harwich, Essex in a leaky condition.
Pronk	United Kingdom	The ship was wrecked at Great Yarmouth, Norfolk.
Sir William Wallace	United Kingdom	The ship was driven ashore at Tetney Haven, Lincolnshire. She was on a voyage from France to Blyth, Northumberland. She was refloated on 5 December and teken into Grimsby, Lincolnshire.
Stag	United Kingdom	The ship sprang a leak and was abandoned by ger crew. She was on a voyage from Montreal, Quebec, Canada to London.
Sterren	Denmark	The schooner ran aground on the Pardenmarkt, off the Belgian coast. Her crew were rescued.
Stranger	United Kingdom	The barque was driven ashore at Humberston, Lincolnshire. Her crew were rescued.
Sundenes Minde	Norway	The ship was wrecked near "Ruberg", Denmark with the loss of all but one of her crew. She was on a voyage from Sundsvall, Sweden to London.
Treasure	United Kingdom	The ship was driven ashore at Blakeney, Norfolk. Her crew were rescued.
Two Brothers	United Kingdom	The ship was driven ashore and wrecked at Hunstanton, Norfolk. Her crew were rescued.
Venetian	United Kingdom	The steamship ran aground at the mouth of the River Mersey. She was on a voyage from Alexandria, Egypt to Liverpool, Lancashire. She was refloated with the assistance of two tugs and towed into Liverpool.
Violet	United Kingdom	The schooner was abandoned in the North Sea off the coast of Yorkshire with the loss of a crew member. Survivors were rescued by the steamship Charente (France). Violet was on a voyage from Inverness to Newcastle upon Tyne, Northumberland. She subsequently drove ashore and was wrecked at Flamborough Head.

== 5 December ==
List of shipwrecks: 5 December 1867
Ship	State	Description
Alice Kelly	United Kingdom	The ship departed from Glasgow, Renfrewshire for Bombay, India. No further trace, presumed foundered with the loss of all hands.
Bertha John	United Kingdom	The ship was driven ashore. She was on a voyage from Rio de Janeiro, Brazil to Gothenburg, Sweden.
Deron	United Kingdom	The ship collided with Sourabaya (Netherlands) and sank. She was on a voyage from London to Saint-Nazaire, Loire-Inférieure, France.
Dolphin	Wismar	The sloop was wrecked at "Saby". She was on a voyage from Wismar to an English port.
George and Ann	United Kingdom	The brig was driven ashore at Grainthorpe, Lincolnshire.
Glendevon	United Kingdom	The ship was wrecked on Ouessant, Finistère, France. She was on a voyage from Brăila, Ottoman Empire to Queenstown, County Cork.
Greyhound	United Kingdom	The smack was abandoned in the North Sea. Her crew were rescued.
Harvest	United Kingdom	The ship departed from Trieste for London. No further trace, presumed foundered with the loss of all hands.
James Scott	United Kingdom	The barque sank at Thisted, Denmark.
I. O	United Kingdom	The ship foundered in the North Sea. Her crew were rescued.
Louisa Caroline	Denmark	The schooner was driven ashore in the Mariager Fjord. She was on a voyage from Hull, Yorkshire, United Kingdom to Aalborg.
Nine Sisters	Norway	The schooner was driven ashore at West Hartlepool, County Durham, United Kingdom. Her eight crew were rescued by the Hartlepool lifeboat. She was on a voyage from Dram to the River Tyne. She was refloated on 10 December and taken into West Hartlepool.
Unda	Trieste	The ship foundered off Cagliari, Sardinia, Italy. Her crew were rescued. She was on a voyage from Trieste toa British port.
Unknown	Flag unknown	The brig ran aground and sank on the Longsand, in the North Sea off the coast of Essex, United Kingdom.
Unnamed	United Kingdom	The sloop was destroyed by fire at Maldon, Essex.

== 6 December ==
List of shipwrecks: 6 December 1867
Ship	State	Description
Celine Leonie	France	The schooner foundered in the Bristol Channel off Swansea, Glamorgan, United Kingdom. Her crew took to the boats; they were rescued the next day by the steamship Perthshire Lassie (United Kingdom). Celine Leonie was on a voyage from Swansea to Les Sables d'Olonne, Vendée.
Christian and Charlotte	United Kingdom	The ship sloop driven ashore and wrecked at Saint Andrews, Fife. Her four crew were rescued by the Saint Andrews Lifeboat. She was on a voyage from Leith, Lothian to Fraserburgh, Aberdeenshire.
Christina Elizabeth	Norway	The ship was abandoned off the mouth of the Humber. Her crew were rescued. She was on a voyage from Newcastle upon Tyne, Northumberland, United Kingdom to Kristiansand. She was taken into Grimsby in a derelict condition on 4 December.
Elizabeth	United Kingdom	The schooner was run aground in the North Sea off Gibraltar Point, Lincolnshire. Her captain was taken off by the Skegness Lifeboat Herbert Ingram ( Royal National Lifeboat Institution) to seek assistance.
Fleetly	United Kingdom	The brig foundered. Her crew were rescued.
Kronprinsesse Josephin	Sweden	The derelict ship was taken into Lysekil.
Myrtle	United Kingdom	The schooner was driven ashore and severely damaged at Whitehaven, Cumberland. She was on a voyage from Belfast, County Antrim to Maryport, Cumberland. She had become a wreck by 12 December.
Rose in June	United Kingdom	The sloop was driven ashore and wrecked near Wells-next-the-Sea, Norfolk. She was on a voyage from Goole, Yorkshire to Walsingham, Norfolk.
Saranack	United States	The ship was driven ashore at the Menai Lighthouse, Anglesey, United Kingdom.
Sultana	United Kingdom	The steamship collided with the steamship Harwich (United Kingdom and sank at Bath, Zeeland, Netherlands with the loss of a crew member. She was on a voyage from Hull, Yorkshire to Antwerp, Belgium.
Thomas Whitworth	United Kingdom	The schooner was wrecked in the Copeland Islands, County Down with the loss of two of her crew. She was on a voyage from Fleetwood, Lancashire to Belfast, County Antrim.
Thornton	United Kingdom	The ship ran aground and was wrecked at the mouth of the River Mersey. Her crew were rescued by the tug Lion (United Kingdom) and the New Brighton Lifeboat Willie and Arthur ( Royal National Lifeboat Institution). Thornton was on a voyage from New York to Liverpool, Lancashire.
T. J. Southard	United States	The ship was driven ashore and wrecked near the Menai Lighthouse. Her 22 crew were rescued by the Penmon Lifeboat. She was on a voyage from New York to Liverpool.
Unnamed	United Kingdom	The ship ran aground on the Skullmartin Rock, in the Belfast Lough.

== 7 December ==
List of shipwrecks: 7 December 1867
Ship	State	Description
Alfred	United Kingdom	The ship foundered in the Atlantic Ocean 40 nautical miles (74 km) north west of Ouessant, Finistère, France. Her crew were rescued by Celt (United Kingdom) and Tistedalen (Norway). Alfred was on a voyage from Liverpool, Lancashire to Calcutta, India.
Barrott	United Kingdom	The schooner was wrecked on the Kentish Knock. Her crew were rescued. She was on a voyage from Saint Petersburg, Russia to Bristol, Gloucestershire.
Beaute	Prussia	The brig was wrecked a "Maygnava". She was on a voyage from Jacmel, Haiti to Falmouth, Cornwall, United Kingdom.
Elizabeth	Bremen	The barque was wrecked on the Kentish Knock. Her crew were rescued. She was on a voyage from Bremen to Havre de Grâce, Seine-Inférieure, France.
Esk	United Kingdom	The steamship was driven against the quayside at Guernsey, Channel Islands. She sprang a severe leak and was beached. She was on a voyage from London to Jersey, Channel Islands.
Firefly	United Kingdom	The derelict brig was driven ashore and wrecked at Thisted, Denmark.
Geludrvon	Ottoman Empire	The ship was driven ashore and sank on Ouessant, Finistère, France. She was on a voyage from Galaţi to Falmouth or Queenstown, County Cork.
George	United Kingdom	The brigantine was driven ashore at Lowestoft, Suffolk. Her crew were rescued. She was refloated on 10 December and sailed for Great Yarmouth, Norfolk.
Hammonia	United Kingdom	The steamship ran aground off Brancaster, Norfolk and was wrecked. All 25 people on board were rescued in the ship's boats or by the Hunstanton Lifeboat Licensed Vituallers ( Royal National Lifeboat Institution). Hammonia was on a voyage from Hamburg to Hull, Yorkshire.
Hurrell	United Kingdom	The schooner was driven ashore and wrecked at Newquay, Cornwall. She was on a voyage from Cardiff, Glamorgan to Newquay. She was refloated the next day and taken into Newquay.
Isis	United Kingdom	The brig was damaged by fire in the River Thames.
Matthew and Ann	United Kingdom	The brig was driven ashore south of Cleethorpes, Lincolnshire. She was on a voyage from Rotterdam, South Holland, Netherlands to Sunderland, County Durham. She was refloated on 9 December and taken into Grimsby, Lincolnshire.
Mountaineer	United Kingdom	The schooner ran aground on the South Bull, in the Irish Sea off the coast of County Dublin. She was on a voyage from Ardrossan, Ayrshire to Drogheda, County Louth.
Nimrod	United Kingdom	The ship sank with the loss of two of her crew. She was on a voyage from Terra Nova to London.
North of Scotland	United Kingdom	The barque was driven ashore 12 nautical miles (22 km) north of Libava, Courland Governorate. Her crew were rescued. She was on a voyage from Gävle, Sweden to London.
Nouveau Caboteur	France	The ship was driven ashore in the Bay of Zurriola, Spain. Her six crew were rescued.
Prince Saxe-Coburg	United Kingdom	The brig was driven ashore near Cleethorpes, Lincolnshire with the loss of four of her crew.
Sally	United Kingdom	The brig was driven ashore and wrecked at Pakefield, Suffolk. Her crew were rescued by the Pakefield Lifeboat. She was on a voyage from Hartlepool, County Durham to Ostend, West Flanders, Belgium.
Via	United Kingdom	The schooner was driven ashore between Broadstairs and the North Foreland, Kent and was scuttled. Her crew survived. She was on a voyage from London to São Miguel Island, Azores.
Unnamed	Prussia	The schooner was driven ashore at Cleethorpes.
Unnamed	United States	The ship ran aground on the Dinmore Bank, in the Irish Sea off the coast of Anglesey, United Kingdom. Her 22 crew were rescued by the Beaumaris Lifeboat Pennion ( Royal National Lifeboat Institution).

== 8 December ==
List of shipwrecks: 8 December 1867
Ship	State	Description
Aeron	France	The ship collided with another vessel and sank. Her crew were rescued. She was on a voyage from London, United Kingdom to Saint-Nazaire, Loire-Inférieure.
Caledonia	United Kingdom	The brig was driven ashore and wrecked at Cley-next-the-Sea, Norfolk with the loss of all hands.
Joseph	United Kingdom	The mud barge was run into by the steam collier Kenilworth (United Kingdom) and sank in the River Thames with the loss of all three crew.
Nimrod	United Kingdom	The ship foundered 10 nautical miles (19 km) north of Cap La Hougue, Manche. with the loss of two of her eight crew. She was on a voyage from Sicily, Italy to London.
Pearl	United Kingdom	The barque capsized in the Kattegat with the loss of a crew member. She was subsequently taken into Gothenburg, Sweden in a derelict condition.
Richard Cobden	United Kingdom	The fishing smack foundered in the North Sea. Her crew were rescued by the smack George and Elizabeth (United Kingdom).
Roe	United Kingdom	The barque was wrecked at Winterton-on-Sea, Norfolk with the loss of all hands.
Trois Jean Baptiste	France	The ship foundered in the Mediterranean Sea 110 nautical miles (200 km) off Zakynthos, Greece. Her eight crew were rescued by the barque Italia (Italy). Trois Jean Baptiste was on a voyage from Oran, Algeria to Agrigento, Sicily, Italy.
Unnamed	United Kingdom	The ship ran aground on the Doom Bar. Her three crew were rescued by the Padstow Lifeboat Albert Edward ( Royal National Lifeboat Institution).

== 9 December ==
List of shipwrecks: 9 December 1867
Ship	State	Description
Balmoral	United Kingdom	The steamship was driven ashore at Tranmere, Cheshire. She was on a voyage from Liverpool, Lancashire to Ghent, East Flanders, Belgium.
Catherine	United Kingdom	The ship ran aground at Bridlington, Yorkshire. She was on a voyage from Ängelholm, Sweden to Newcastle upon Tyne, Northumberland.
Evening Star	United Kingdom	The ship was driven ashore at Saint John, New Brunswick, Canada. She was on a voyage from Saint John to London. She was later refloated and taken into St John.
Greyhound	United Kingdom	The schooner was wrecked near the Shaystone, of the south coast of Devon. She was on a voyage from an Irish port to Exeter, Devon.
Isabella Maria	United Kingdom	The schooner collided with HMS Viper (Royal Navy) and sank in the River Mersey. She was on a voyage from Garston, Lancashire to Dundalk, County Louth.
Minnie	United Kingdom	The ship was wrecked 10 nautical miles (19 km) east of Ystad, Sweden. She was on a voyage from Riga, Russia to Hull, Yorkshire.
Ocean	Sweden	The derelict barque was towed into Ramsgate, Kent, United Kingdom.
Orion	United Kingdom	The ship departed from Cardiff, Glamorgan for Malta. No further trace, presumed foundered with the loss of all hands.
Polar Star	Rostock	The barque was abandoned in the North Sea off St. Abb's Head, Berwickshire, United Kingdom. Her crew were rescued by the schooner Kristine (Denmark).
Yarra	United Kingdom	The barque foundered in the Atlantic Ocean. Her crew were rescued. She was on a voyage from the West Indies to Bristol, Gloucestershire.
Zipora	Sweden	The schooner was driven ashore on "Lissor". She was on a voyage from Norrköping to an English port. She was refloated and taken into Varburg in a leaky condition.

== 10 December ==
List of shipwrecks: 10 December 1867
Ship	State	Description
Emily	United Kingdom	The barque was driven ashore at Winterton-on-Sea, Norfolk in a capsized condition.
Ferris	United Kingdom	The brig was wrecked on the Haisborough Sands, in the North Sea off the coast of Norfolk. Her crew survived. She was on a voyage from Whitby, Yorkshire to Havre de Grâce, Seine-Inférieure, France.
Ocean Wave	United Kingdom	The ship was driven ashore and wrecked near Blackpool, Lancashire. She was on a voyage from Liverpool to Preston, Lancashire.
Samuel Warren	United Kingdom	The schooner was driven ashore at Lowestoft, Suffolk. She was refloated with the assistance of a tug and taken into Lowestoft.
Terrible	United Kingdom	The brig was wrecked on the Haisborough Sands, in the North Sea off the coast of Norfolk. Her crew were rescued. She was on a voyage from Whitby, Yorkshire to Havre de Grâce, Seine-Inférieure, France.

== 11 December ==
List of shipwrecks: 11 December 1867
Ship	State	Description
Beautiful Star	United Kingdom	The ship was abandoned on the Grand Banks of Newfoundland. Her crew were rescued by Rhine (United States). Beautiful Star was on a voyage from Laguna, Mexico to Liverpool, Lancashire.
Cossipore	United Kingdom	The barque ran aground on the Haisborough Sands, in the North Sea off the coast of Norfolk. She was on a voyage from Riga, Russia to Liverpool, Lancashire. She was refloated and assisted into Lowestoft, Suffolk in a leaky condition.
Fairfax	United Kingdom	The steamship ran aground on the Newcombe Sands, in the North Sea off the coast of Suffolk. She was on a voyage from the Black Sea to Newcastle upon Tyne, Northumberland. She was refloated the next day and resumed her voyage.
Hillechina	Netherlands	The koff was abandoned in the North Sea 20 nautical miles (37 km) east south east of Texel, North Holland. Her five crew were rescued by Alerte (Hamburg). Hillechina was on a voyage from London, United Kingdom to Amsterdam, North Holland.
Jane Simpson	United Kingdom	The schooner was driven ashore near "Goerde", Netherlands. Her crew were rescued.
Renown	United Kingdom	The schooner was driven ashore at Ramsgate, Kent. She was on a voyage from Great Yarmouth, Norfolk to Livorno, Italy.
Return	United Kingdom	The schooner struck the Brest Rock, off the coast of Ayrshire and sank. She was on a voyage from Belfast, County Antrim to Ayr.
Waters	United Kingdom	The brig was wrecked on the Haisborough Sands, in the North Sea off the coast of Norfolk. Her crew were rescued.

== 12 December ==
List of shipwrecks: 12 December 1867
Ship	State	Description
Edith	United Kingdom	The schooner struck an anchor in the River South Esk and was damaged. She was on a voyage from Montrose, Forfarshire to Sunderland, County Durham.
Ellen	United Kingdom	The ship foundered in the North Sea off the Outer Dowsing Lightship ( Trinity House). Her crew were rescued.
Jane Sophia	United Kingdom	The schooner ran aground at Aberdovey, Merionethshire. She was on a voyage from Newport, Monmouthshire to Aberdovey. She was refloated with assistance from the Aberdovey Lifeboat and assisted into Aberdove in a severely leaky condition.
Newarp Lightship	Trinity House	The lightship was run into by another vessel and was severely damaged.
Traendine	Norway	The barque was wrecked on the Haisborough Sands, in the North Sea off the coast of Norfolk, United Kingdom. Her crew were rescued. She was refloated and taken into Great Yarmouth, Norfolk in a waterlogged condition.
Vine	United Kingdom	The ship was crushed by ice and sank in the Elbe 12 nautical miles (22 km) downstream of Hamburg. Her crew survived. She was on a voyage from Hamburg to Sunderland, County Durham.
William	United Kingdom	The ship was driven ashore at Breaksea Point, Glamorgan. She was on a voyage from Bideford, Devon to Newport. She was refloated the next day and taken into Aberthaw, Glamorgan.
Wolf	United Kingdom	The steam lighter was abandoned in the River Clyde and sank. She was refloated on 25 April 1868.

== 13 December ==
List of shipwrecks: 13 December 1867
Ship	State	Description
Ford	United Kingdom	The brig was wrecked on the Deurloo Sand, in the North Sea off the Dutch coast. Her crew were rescued. She was on a voyage from Sunderland, County Durham to Ostend, West Flanders, Belgium.
Gudenan	Norway	The galiot was wrecked at Thisted, Denmark. Her crew were rescued She was on a voyage from Randers to Newcastle upon Tyne, Northumberland, United Kingdom.
Hebe	United Kingdom	The smack was abandoned in the North Sea off Great Yarmouth, Norfolk. Her crew were rescued.
James Brook	United Kingdom	The ship was crushed by ice and sank in the Elbe 14 nautical miles (26 km) downstream of Hamburg. Her crew survived. She was on a voyage from Hamburg to Hartlepool, County Durham.
Williams	United Kingdom	The brig ran aground on Smith's Knowl, in the North Sea off the coast of Norfolk and sank. Her crew were rescued by a smack. She was on a voyage from South Shields, County Durham to the Nieuw Diep.
Woodstock	United Kingdom	The ship was wrecked at Gaspé, Quebec, Canada with the loss of eight of her eighteen crew. She was on a voyage from Quebec City to London.

== 14 December ==
List of shipwrecks: 14 December 1867
Ship	State	Description
Ada	United Kingdom	The ship foundered east of Bornholm, Denmark. Her crew were rescued. She was on a voyage from Riga, Russia to Newry, County Antrim.
Bolina	United Kingdom	The barque was wrecked in the Bay of Zea. Her crew were rescued. She was on a voyage from Cardiff, Glamorgan to Piraeus, Greece.
Bywater	United Kingdom	The ship ran aground. She was on a voyage from West Hartlepool, County Durham to Dieppe, Seine-Inférieure, France. She was refloated and taken into Harwich, Essex in a severely leaky condition.
Ocean Queen	United Kingdom	The ship ran aground on the Longsand, in the North Sea off the coast of Essex. She was on a voyage from Ipswich, Suffolk to Dublin. She was refloated and taken into Harwich in a leaky condition.
Queen	Newfoundland Colony	The brigantine was wrecked near Twillingate. All on board survived the shipwreck, but subsequently perished. She was on a voyage from Saint John's to Silt Cove.
Regina	United Kingdom	The barque was wrecked at St. Mary's, Colony of Newfoundland. She was on a voyage from the Clyde to Boston, Massachusetts, United States.
Shallett	United Kingdom	The ship departed from Colombo, Ceylon for London. No further trace, presumed foundered with the loss of all hands.

== 15 December ==
List of shipwrecks: 15 December 1867
Ship	State	Description
Hannah	United Kingdom	The ship was wrecked on the Banjaard Sand, in the North Sea off the Dutch coast. She was on a voyage from London to Rotterdam, South Holland, Netherlands.
H. L. Richardson	United States	The ship was damaged by fire at Bombay, India.

== 16 December ==
List of shipwrecks: 16 December 1867
Ship	State	Description
Coquette	United Kingdom	The ship ran aground on the Nidingen Reef, in the Baltic Sea. She floated off and drifted into the Kattegat, where her crew were taken off. She was on a voyage from Riga, Russia to Aberdeen.
Devonshire	United Kingdom	The barque ran aground on the Ouze Edge Sand, in the Thames Estuary.
Eliza A. Kenny	United Kingdom	The ship was driven ashore and severely damaged at Penarth, Glamorgan. She was on a voyage from Cardiff, Glamorgan to Montevideo, Uruguay. She was refloated and towed into Cardiff.
Etna Morgana	Sweden	The ship ran aground on the Nidingen Reef. She was on a voyage from Söderhamn to Grimsby, Lincolnshire, United Kingdom.
Hannah	United Kingdom	The schooner ran aground and was wrecked off the coast of Zeeland, Netherlands. Her crew were rescued. She was on a voyage from London to Rotterdam, South Holland, Netherlands.
Marie Amelie	France	The barque was wrecked on the Punta Mala Reef, off Gibara, Cuba. Her crew were rescued. She was on a voyage from Liverpool, Lancashire, United Kingdom to Havana, Cuba.
Mimswell	United Kingdom	The ship was driven ashore at Malmö, Sweden. Her crew were rescued. She was on a voyage from Kronstadt, Russia to Grimsby.
Strathleven	United Kingdom	The barque ran aground on The Heughs, off the coast of Wigtownshire. Fifteen crew were rescued by the Port Logan Lifeboat. She was on a voyage from Demerara, British Guiana to Glasgow, Renfrewshire. Strathleven broke up on 24 December.

== 17 December ==
List of shipwrecks: 17 December 1867
Ship	State	Description
Cuba	Denmark	The derelict barque was towed into London, United Kingdom in a waterlogged condition.
Gerent	United Kingdom	The ship was driven ashore at North Sunderland, County Durham. She was on a voyage from Middlesbrough, Yorkshire to Leven, Fife. She was refloated and taken into North Sunderland.
Isabelle Mathilde	France	The ship was driven ashore at Cape Breton. She was on a voyage from Bordeaux, Gironde to an English port.
Jolar	United Kingdom	The ship foundered in the Indian Ocean off Mauritius. Her crew were rescued by Moonbeam (United Kingdom). Jolar was on a voyage from London to Bombay, India.
Liberta	Denmark	The ship was driven ashore at "Varra".
Mary	United Kingdom	The ship struck rocks off Boulmer, Northumberland and sank. She was on a voyage from Middlesbrough to Arbroath, Forfarshire.
William Gowland	United Kingdom	The brig collided with Volunteer (United Kingdom and sank in the River Thames at Greenhithe, Kent. She was refloated and beached at Limehouse, Middlesex.

== 18 December ==
List of shipwrecks: 18 December 1867
Ship	State	Description
Consul	United Kingdom	The ship was damaged by fire at Tybee Island, Georgia, United States. She was towed into Savanna, Georgia on 20 December.
Edward and James	United Kingdom	The dandy collided with the schooner Zephyr (United Kingdom) and was abandoned in the North Sea 7 nautical miles (13 km) south east of Staple Island, Northumberland. Her crew were rescued by Zephyr. Edward and James was on a voyage from Invergordon, Moray to Sunderland, County Durham.
Frank Lovett	United Kingdom	The ship was driven ashore at Ballyferris Point, County Antrim. She was on a voyage from Quebec City, Canada to Warrenpoint, County Antrim. She was refloated and taken in tow for Warrenpoint.
Mary Schabbro	Flag unknown	The brig was wrecked on Rømø, Denmark
Moses Waring	United States	The schooner was abandoned in the Atlantic Ocean. Her crew were rescued by the barque Minnie Gordon (United Kingdom). Moses Waring was on a voyage from Brunswick, Georgia to New York.
Sir George Seymour	United Kingdom	The ship was carrying a cargo of coal from Liverpool to Bombay when the cargo suffered spontaneous combustion at 25°S 25°W. Her crew abandoned her; Leda (United Kingdom), which was on her way to Calcutta, rescued 15 crew members.

== 19 December ==
List of shipwrecks: 19 December 1867
Ship	State	Description
Inverness	United Kingdom	The schooner ran aground at Montrose, Forfarshire. She was on a voyage from Montrose to Sunderland, County Durham. She was refloated.
Jessie Brown	United Kingdom	The steamship was driven ashore at Larne, County Antrim. She was on a voyage from Glasgow, Renfrewshire to Londonderry. She was refloated.
Polarstern	Flag unknown	The derelict barque was driven ashore at Lowestoft, Suffolk, United Kingdom.
Secret	United Kingdom	The steamship was driven ashore at Aldeburgh, Suffolk. She was on a voyage from Amsterdam, North Holland, Netherlands to London. She was refloated.

== 20 December ==
List of shipwrecks: 20 December 1867
Ship	State	Description
Agenoria	United Kingdom	The brig ran aground on the West Knock, in the Thames Estuary. She was on a voyage from Guernsey, Channel Islands to London.
Catherine Hughes	United Kingdom	The schooner was driven ashore and wrecked at Malin Head, County Donegal. Her crew were rescued. She was on a voyage from Ballina, County Mayo to Glasgow, Renfrewshire.
Expert	United Kingdom	The barque was wrecked on Marettimo, Italy, Her crew were rescued. She was on a voyage from Newcastle upon Tyne, Northumberland to Constantinople, Ottoman Empire.
H. J. Knight	United Kingdom	The ship struck a sunken wreck off Portland Bill, Dorset and was damaged. She was on a voyage from Newcastle upon Tyne, Northumberland to Porto, Portugal. She put into Exmouth, Devon in a leaking condition.
Mapere	(United Kingdom of Great Britain and Ireland) New Zealand	The 30-ton schooner capsized and was lost near Tairua during a squall, possibly as a result of her ballast shifting. All hands were saved.
Maria	United Kingdom	The ship was wrecked at Wyk auf Föhr, Prussia. She was on a voyage from Varde, Denmark to London.
Rushing Water, and Startled Fawn	United Kingdom	The barque Rushing Water collided with Startled Fawn in the English Channel off Dungeness, Kent. Both vessels foundered. Their crews survived. Rushing Water was on a voyage from Calcutta, India to London. Startled Fawn was on a voyage from Sunderland, County Durham to Madras, India.
Skylark	United Kingdom	The smack collided with a steamship and sank off the Great Orme Head, Caernarfonshire. Her crew were rescued. She was on a voyage from Dublin to Barrow-in-Furness, Lancashire.
Lewis	United Kingdom	The smack was run down and sunk in the Clyde by the steamship Meteor (United Kingdom) with the loss of two of her three crew.
Unnamed	United Kingdom	The barque was driven ashore near Cape Sāo Roque, Brazil.

== 21 December ==
List of shipwrecks: 21 December 1867
Ship	State	Description
Anna Maria	United Kingdom	The ship was wrecked near Berwick upon Tweed, Northumberland. She was on a voyage from Sunderland, County Durham to Dundee, Forfarshire.
Colonel Stell	United States	The sidewheel paddle steamer was lost.
Favourite	United Kingdom	The sloop sank. She was on a voyage from Isle Martin, Ross-shire to Stornoway, Isle of Lewis, Outer Hebrides.
Johanna	Stralsund	The brig was driven ashore and wrecked at Beadnell, Northumberland. Her crew were rescued. She was on a voyage from Caen, Calvados to Granton, Lothian, United Kingdom.
Johns	United Kingdom	The brig was driven ashore and wrecked at Whitburn, County Durham. Her crew were rescued. She was on a voyage from Hamburg to Hartlepool, County Durham. She was refloated on 24 December and taken into Sunderland, County Durham.
Portland	United Kingdom	The schooner was driven ashore at Sizewell, Suffolk.
Prince Leopold	United Kingdom	The brig was driven ashore east of the Hook Lighthouse, County Wexford. She was on a voyage from Cardiff, Glamorgan to Wexford. She had become a wreck by 31 December.
Swansea	United Kingdom	The steamship collided with the steamship Magnetic (United Kingdom) and sank at the mouth of the River Mersey. Her crew were rescued by Magnetic. Swansea was on a voyage from Liverpool, Lancashire to Swansea, Glamorgan.
Von Itzein	Prussia	The barque was wrecked at Thisted, Denmark. Her crew were rescued. She was on a voyage from Sunderland to Swinemünde.

== 22 December ==
List of shipwrecks: 22 December 1867
Ship	State	Description
Bonne Mere	United Kingdom	The ship ran aground on the Barber Sand, in the North Sea off the cost of Norfolk. She was refloated and resumed her voyage.
Boulogne	United Kingdom	The steamship was driven ashore at Breaksea Point, Glamorgan. She was on a voyage from Dublin to Cardiff, Glamorgan. She was refloated and taken into Penarth, Glamorgan.
Ellen Foster	United States	The medium clipper was wrecked in Puget Sound. Her crew were rescued. She was on a voyage from Callao, Peru to the Puget Sound.
Forth	United Kingdom	The steamship ran aground on the Maplin Sand, in the North Sea off the coast of Essex. She was on a voyage from Porto, Portugal to London.
Tornado	United Kingdom	The barque was driven ashoreand wrecked at Cairnbulg Head, Aberdeenshire. She was on a voyage from Inverness to Sunderland, County Durham.
Unnamed	United Kingdom	The schooner ran aground on the Haisborough Sands, in the North Sea off the coast of Norfolk and was abandoned by her crew. She was refloated with the intention of taking her into Great Yarmouth, Norfolk.

== 23 December ==
List of shipwrecks: 23 December 1867
Ship	State	Description
Carl	Greifswald	The ship sank at Kronstadt, Russian Empire. She was on a voyage from Hartlepool, County Durham, United Kingdom to Griefswald.
Fairy Queen	United Kingdom	The barque was driven ashore and wrecked in the Saltee Islands, County Wexford. Her crew were rescued. She was on a voyage from Africa to Liverpool, Lancashire.
Favourite	United Kingdom	The sloop sank at Tolsta, Isle of Lewis, Outer Hebrides. Her crew were rescued.
Helen	United Kingdom	The ship was sighted off Havana, Cuba whilst on a voyage from St. Anne's Bay, Jamaica to London. No further trace, presumed foundered with the loss of all hands.
Hermanus	Netherlands	The ship collided with Jeltina (Netherlands) off the Dutch coast and was abandoned. Her crew were rescued. She was on a voyage from Stralsund to London, United Kingdom.
Margaret	United Kingdom	The schooner ran aground on the Plough Rock and was damaged. She was on a voyage from Sunderland, County Durham to Dundee, Forfarshire. She put into Berwick upon Tweed, Northumberland.
Minerva	Netherlands	The brig ran aground on the Long Sand, in the North Sea off the coast of Essex, United Kingdom. She was on a voyage from Rotterdam, South Holland, Netherlands to Havana, Cuba.

== 24 December ==
List of shipwrecks: 24 December 1867
Ship	State	Description
Panther	United Kingdom	The ship was driven ashore at Cape Prospect, Nova Scotia, Canada. She was on a voyage from Baltimore, Maryland, United States to Saint John's, Newfoundland Colony. She was later refloated and taken into Halifax, Nova Scotia.
Raleigh	United States	The steamship caught fire and sank 16 nautical miles (30 km) off Charleston, South Carolina with loss of life. Thirty-one of the 55 people on board were rescued; some of them by the tug Christiania and the brig Tangent (both United States). The rest were reported missing, with at least half of them presumed to have drowned. Raleigh was on a voyage from New York to New Orleans, Louisiana.
Union	United Kingdom	The brig ran aground on the Caister Shoal, in the North Sea off the coast of Norfolk. She was refloated and taken into Great Yarmouth, Norfolk in a leaky condition.
Walter Stanhope	United Kingdom	The steamship was driven ashore at "Schuthoek".
Welcome	United Kingdom	The ship departed from Cuxhaven for Hull, Yorkshire. No further trace, presumed foundered with the loss of all hands.

== 27 December ==
List of shipwrecks: 27 December 1867
Ship	State	Description
Arab	United Kingdom	The schooner was destroyed by fire in the River Spey. She was on a voyage from Perth to Middlesbrough, North Riding of Yorkshire.
Dagmar	United Kingdom	The ship sighted in the Atlantic Ocean whilst on a voyage from Cardiff, Glamorgan to Bombay, India. No further trace, presumed foundered with the loss of all hands.
Jeune Pauline	France	The ship was driven ashore on the Île d'Yeu, Vendée. Her crew were rescued. She was on a voyage from "Lisbaurne" to Dunkirk, Nord.
Lady Gordon	United Kingdom	The ship was abandoned at sea. She was on a voyage from Maryport, Cumberland to Havre de Grâce, Seine-Inférieure, France.
Newbiggin	United Kingdom	The ship was driven ashore at "St. Stefan's. She was on a voyage from Taganrog, Russia to a British port.

== 28 December ==
List of shipwrecks: 28 December 1867
Ship	State	Description
Baron Hambro	United Kingdom	The steamship ran aground near Hellevoetsluis, Zeeland, Netherlands.
Deerslayer	United Kingdom	The barque was wrecked at Carrizal Bajo, Chile.
Emanuel	United Kingdom	The ship strucke a sunken wreck and was damaged. She was on a voyage from Newcastle upon Tyne, Northumberland to Flensburg, Prussia. She put into Fredrikshavn, Denmark in a leaky condition.
Flecha	Belgium	The steamship ran aground on the Sinkerplaat, in the North Sea. She was on a voyage from London, United Kingdom to Ghent, East Flanders.

== 29 December ==
List of shipwrecks: 29 December 1867
Ship	State	Description
George	United Kingdom	The brigantine collided with the steamship Anglia (United Kingdom) and sank in the North Sea off the coast of Norfolk with the loss of five of her six crew. The survivor was rescued by Anglia. George was on a voyage from Middlesbrough, Yorkshire to Cardiff, Glamorgan.
Latona	United Kingdom	The Thames barge sank at Limehouse, Middlesex. She was on a voyage from the Pool of London to Limehouse.
Mathilde	United Kingdom	The schooner was driven ashore and wrecked at Höganäs, Sweden. Her crew were rescued. She was on a voyage from Newcastle upon Tyne, Northumberland to Rostock.
Raven	United Kingdom	The ship was wrecked on Haisborough Sands, in the North Sea off the coast of Norfolk. Her crew were rescued. She was on a voyage from Blyth, Northumberland to Dover, Kent.
War Cloud	United Kingdom	The ship was driven ashore at Havana, Cuba. She was on a voyage from Liverpool, Lancashire to Havana. She subsequently became a wreck.

== 30 December ==
List of shipwrecks: 30 December 1867
Ship	State	Description
Artisan	United Kingdom	The brig ran aground on the Nore.
Columbus	Norway	The ship caught fire in the Indian Ocean and was abandoned by her crew. They were rescued four days later by Alumina (United Kingdom). Columbus was on a voyage from Cardiff, Glamorgan, United Kingdom to Rangoon, Burma.
Emma	United Kingdom	The schooner sprang a leak and foundered in Skerries Sound. Her crew were rescued. She was on a voyage from Carnlough, County Antrim to Ayr.
Humboldt	Prussia	The barque was driven ashore at Swinemünde. She was on a voyage from Danzig to Bristol, Gloucestershire, United Kingdom.
Lavinia	(United Kingdom of Great Britain and Ireland) Guernsey	The schooner ran aground on the Jenkin Sand, in the Thames Estuary.
Palmer	United Kingdom	The ship sank off Easdale, Argyllshire. She was on a voyage from Jamaica to Liverpool, Lancashire. She was refloated on 23 September 1868.

== 31 December ==
List of shipwrecks: 31 December 1867
Ship	State	Description
Brothers	United Kingdom	The ship foundered. She was on a voyage from Cartagena, Spain to Antwerp, Belgium.
Corsock	United Kingdom	The ship was damaged by fire at Penarth, Glamorgan.
Judy	United Kingdom	The ship was driven ashore and wrecked at Portland Bill, Dorset. Her crew were rescued. She was on a voyage from South Shields, County Durham to Torquay, Devon.
Mary Bell	United Kingdom	The ship was driven ashore and wrecked on the Karamania coast of the Ottoman Empire. Her crew were rescued.
Rhutinas	Russia	The barque ran aground on the Galloper Sand. She was on a voyage from South Shields to Aden. She was refloated and put into Cowes, Isle of Wight, United Kingdom in a leaky condition.

== Unknown date ==
List of shipwrecks: Unknown date in December 1867
Ship	State	Description
Amelia	France	The ship foundered before 26 December with the loss of five of her crew. Survivors were rescued by a Greek ship. She was on a voyage from Marseille, Bouches-du-Rhône to Sierra Leone.
Bella Donna	United Kingdom	The ship sprang a leak in the South China Sea and was abandoned. Her crew were rescued by Omar Pasha (United Kingdom).
Caelle	France	The ship was wrecked near Pont-l'Abbé, Finistère. She was on a voyage from Ardrossan, Ayrshire, United Kingdom to Bordeaux, Gironde.
Chemises	France	The ship foundered in the Mediterranean Sea off Malta. She was on a voyage from Taganrog, Russia to Marseille, Bouches-du-Rhône.
Der Engelbracht	Flag unknown	The ship was wrecked at Algeciras, Spain. She was on a voyage from Carloforte, Sardinia, Italy to Antwerp, Belgium.
Derwentwater	United Kingdom	The brig capsized off Skagen, Denmark. Her crew were rescued. She was on a voyage from Saint Petersburg, Russia to London. Derwentwater was taken into Lysekil Sweden in a derelict condition in January 1868.
Eagle	United Kingdom	The ship was wrecked near Abrevrach, Finistère, France. She was on a voyage from Constantinople, Ottoman Empire to Amsterdam, North Holland, Netherlands.
Elizabeth Barter	United Kingdom	The ship was lost whilst on a voyage from Galaţi, Ottoman Empire to Amsterdam.
Elizabeth Kimball	United States	The clipper was driven ashore at Black Point, California. She was refloated.
Frederick Huth	United Kingdom	The ship was wrecked at the mouth of the Elbe. Her crew were rescued by the steamship Sentinal (United Kingdom).
George	United Kingdom	The brig was driven ashore at Mundesley, Norfolk. Her crew were rescued by the Mundesley Lifeboat Grocers ( Royal National Lifeboat Institution).
Gold	United Kingdom	The ship foundered off Mauritius in a typhoon. Her crew were rescued.
Good Intent	Flag unknown	The brigantine, carrying coal, sank after hitting the Crim Rocks, in the Western Rocks, Isles of Scilly.
Grendevone	United Kingdom	The ship was wrecked. She was on a voyage from Brăila, Ottoman Empire to a British port.
Herman and Oscar	United Kingdom	The ship was driven ashore on Bird Island. She was on a voyage from Liverpool, Lancashire to Galveston, Texas. She was refloated and completed her voyage, arriving at Galveston on 26 December.
Jantje Goosens	Netherlands	The ship foundered in the North Sea.
Loochristie	United Kingdom	The ship ran aground on the Stroombank, in the North Sea. She was on a voyage from Liverpool to Ghent, East Flanders, Belgium. She was later refloated.
Lucy	United Kingdom	The brig was wrecked on the Haaks Bank in the North Sea on 12 or 13 December with the loss of all five crew. Wreckage washed ashore on Ameland, Friesland, Netherlands.
Marie	Greifswald	The brig was wrecked on the coast of Glamorgan, United Kingdom. Her eleven crew were rescued by the Penarth Lifeboat.
Miguellonais	France	The ship foundered. She was on a voyage from Saint Domingo to Havre de Grâce, Seine-Inférieure.
Nilla Nonna	United Kingdom	The ship foundered in the South China Sea before 9 December. She was on a voyage from Swansea, Glamorgan to Shanghai, China.
Norwood	United Kingdom	The ship was abandoned off Cape Clear Island, County Cork. Her crew were rescued by Rosina (United Kingdom).
Novelty	United Kingdom	The schooner was driven ashore on São Miguel Island, Azores.
Palermo	United States	The barque was driven ashore near Aveiro, Portugal.
Queen	United Kingdom	The ship was driven ashore at Abrevach. She was on a voyage from Galaţi, Ottoman Empire to Plymouth, Devon.
Restless	United Kingdom	The schooner was driven ashore at Mundesley. Her crew were rescued by the Mundesley Lifeboat Grocers ( Royal National Lifeboat Institution).
Roland	French Navy	The corvette ran aground on Chios, Greece before 4 December. She was refloated with assistance from SMS Blitz and SMS Hertha (both Prussian Navy).
Rudolph	Prussia	The schooner foundered with the loss of all but her captain. She was on a voyage from Stettin to Memel.
San Juan	United Kingdom)	The schooner sank in the English Channel off Belle Île, Morbihan, France. Her crew were rescued. She was on a voyage from the Black Sea to Falmouth, Cornwall, United Kingdom.
Sicilia	Flag unknown	The barque was abandoned in the Atlantic Ocean.
Thetis	Sweden	The barque was wrecked at Hunstanton, Norfolk. Her sixteen crew were rescued by the Hunstanton Lifeboat Licensed Victuallers ( Royal National Lifeboat Institution).
Twilk	Sweden	The barque was driven ashore and wrecked at Thisted, Denmark with the loss of all hands. She was on a voyage from South Shields, County Durham, United Kingdom to Gothenburg.
Union	United Kingdom	The full-rigged ship was presumed to have foundered in early December with the loss of all 25 crew. She was on a voyage from a port in Mexico to Queenstown, County Cork.
Unionist	United Kingdom	The ship was wrecked at Minatitlán, Mexico.
Victory	United Kingdom	The ship foundered off Malta. Shew as on a voyage from Taganrog to South Shields.
Unknown	United Kingdom	The ship was driven ashore near Abrevach.
