= Southmoor Nature Reserve =

Nature reserve in England

Coordinates: 50.841°N 0.994°W

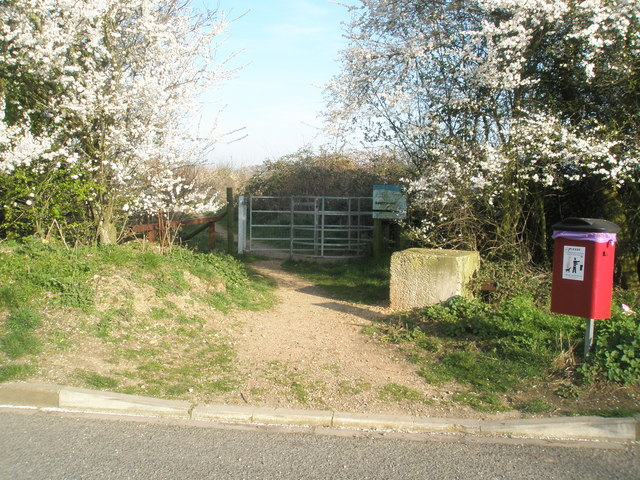
- Interactive map of Southmoor Nature Reserve
- Type: Nature reserve
- Location: Havant, Hampshire
- OS grid: SU709051
- Area: 11 hectares (27 acres)
- Manager: Hampshire and Isle of Wight Wildlife Trust

Southmoor Nature Reserve is a 11-hectare (27-acre) nature reserve in Havant in Hampshire. It is managed by the Hampshire and Isle of Wight Wildlife Trust. It is part of Langstone Harbour, which is a Site of Special Scientific Interest and a Nature Conservation Review site, Grade I. It is also part of Solent Maritime Special Area of Conservation and of Chichester and Langstone Harbours Ramsar site and Special Protection Area.

This reserve on the north coast of Langstone Harbour has grazing marshes and scrub. It is an important habitat for birds and skylarks breed here. Other birds include brent geese, greenfinches and goldfinches.
