= The Kench, Hayling Island =

Nature reserve in Hampshire, England

Coordinates: 50°47′37″N 1°01′07″W

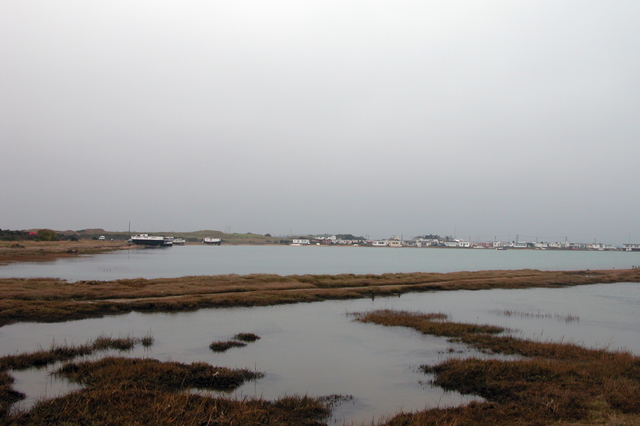
- Interactive map of The Kench, Hayling Island
- Type: Local Nature Reserve
- Location: Hayling Island, Hampshire
- OS grid: SZ 692 997
- Area: 6.0 hectares (15 acres)
- Manager: Hampshire Countryside Service

The Kench, Hayling Island is a 6-hectare (15-acre) Local Nature Reserve on Hayling Island in Hampshire. It is owned by Hampshire County Council and managed by Hampshire Countryside Service. It is part of Chichester and Langstone Harbours Ramsar site and Special Protection Area, Solent Maritime Special Area of Conservation and Langstone Harbour Site of Special Scientific Interest.

This site on the south shore of Langstone Harbour is an area of saltmarsh and intertidal mud. Birds use the mud as a feeding area at low tide and roost on a shingle ridge during high tide.
