= Farlington Marshes =

Nature reserve in Hampshire, England

Coordinates: 50.83459°N 1.03099°W

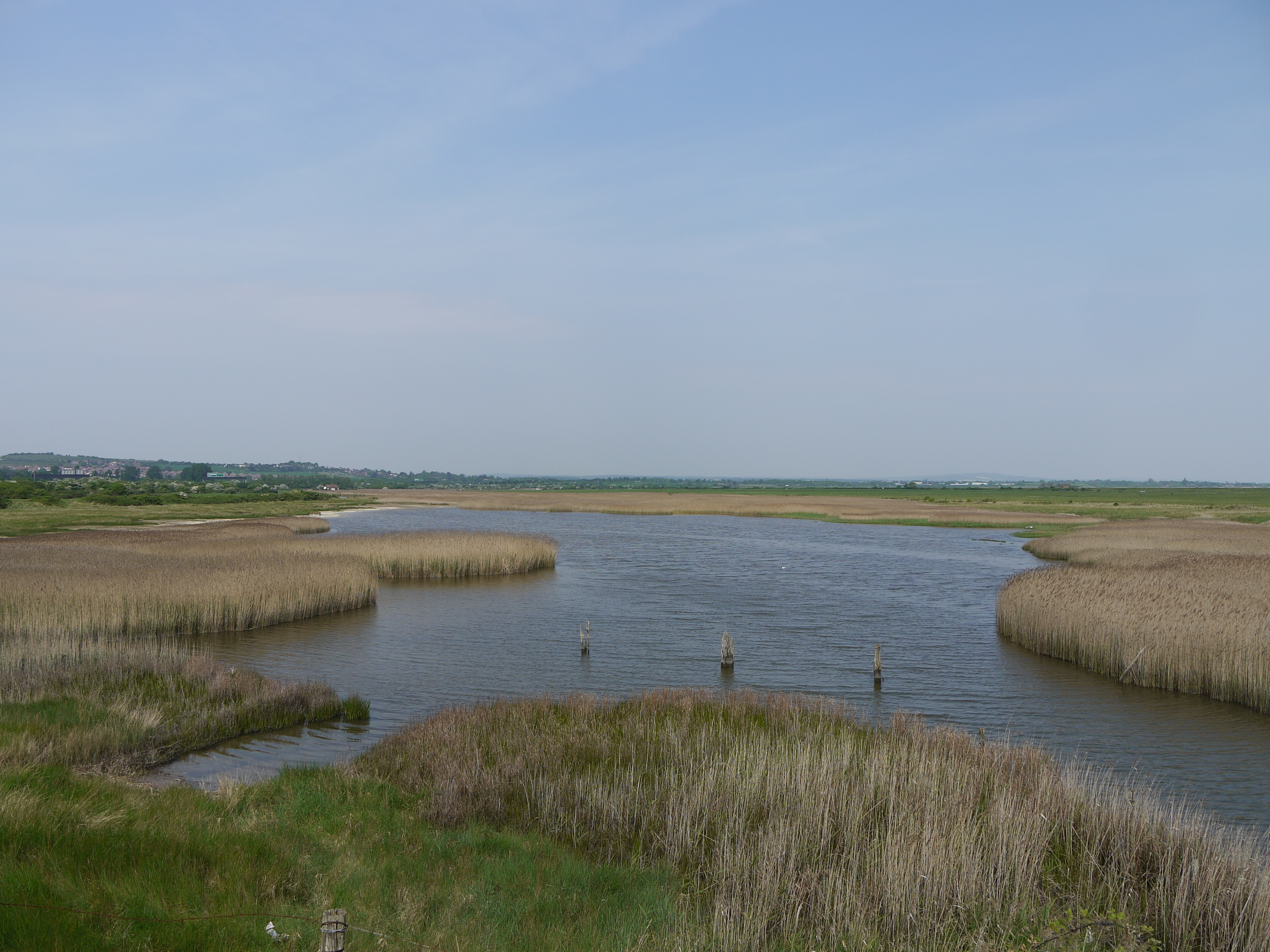
- Interactive map of Farlington Marshes
- Type: Local Nature Reserve
- Location: Portsmouth, Hampshire
- OS grid: SU 685 043
- Area: 119.7 hectares (296 acres)
- Manager: Hampshire and Isle of Wight Wildlife Trust

Farlington Marshes is a 119.7-hectare (296-acre) Local Nature Reserve near Portsmouth in Hampshire. It is owned by Portsmouth City Council and managed by Hampshire and Isle of Wight Wildlife Trust. It is part of Langstone Harbour, which is a Site of Special Scientific Interest and a Nature Conservation Review site, Grade I. It is also part of Solent Maritime Special Area of Conservation and of Chichester and Langstone Harbours Ramsar site and Special Protection Area.

The marshes occupy an area land that was reclaimed from Langstone Harbour in 1771 and includes a larger part of what was formerly Binner's Island (the remainder of the island is now referred to as North Binness Island). The reserve covers about 120 hectares and features both freshwater marsh and brackish marsh. It is a feeding ground for overwintering Brent geese. During World War 2 it was used as a starfish site acting as a decoy for Portsea Island. The control blockhouses remain on the marshes.
