= North Binness Island =

Island in Langstone Harbour

Coordinates: 50.837246°N 1.01793°W

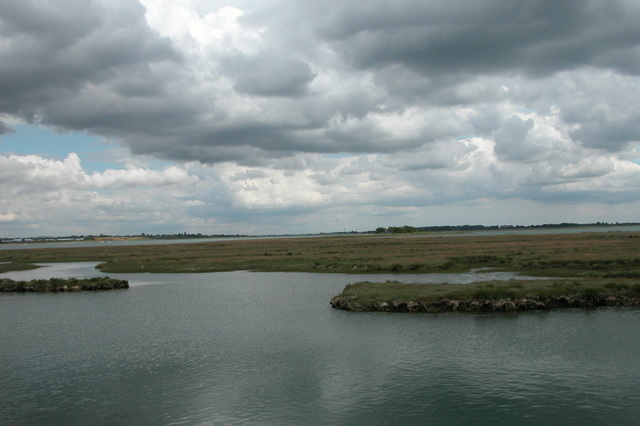
North Binness Island at high tide in July 2005

North Binness Island is a small, uninhabited island in Langstone Harbour. It is 900 metres (980 yd) long and up to 250 metres (270 yd) wide but only rises to 2.5 metres (8 ft) above Ordnance Datum. The island was originally (along with a large part of Farlington Marshes) part of Binner's Island. The island has been uninhabited in recent times, but there is evidence of historical occupation. A 100-metre (110 yd) long earthwork on the island has been suggested to date from the 18th century. There is also archaeological evidence that suggests the island was occupied during the Bronze Age and the Roman period. Finds from the Bronze Age include evidence of a salt works. It has also produced finds dating back to the Mesolithic period, before Langstone Harbour formed and the land became an island.

The island was formerly home to a pond which is now filled with mud. Plants on the island consist of salt-water grasses and a few trees.

In 1978 the island, along with the other islands in Langstone harbour, was acquired by the Royal Society for the Protection of Birds who turned it into a bird sanctuary. Since that time unauthorised landings have been forbidden.
