= Long Island (Hampshire) =

Island in Langstone Harbour in Hampshire, England

Coordinates: 50.8323°N 1.0055°W

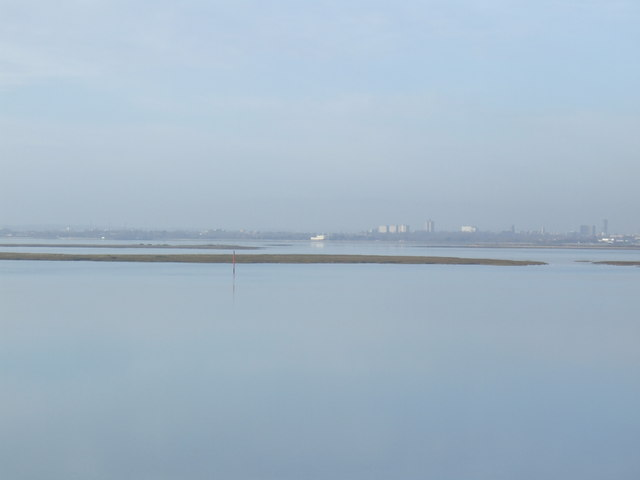
Long Island at high tide

Long Island is an island in Langstone Harbour in Hampshire, England. It is 750 metres (820 yd) long and up to 250 metres (270 yd) wide. Three Bronze Age pots have been found on the island as has Mesolithic and late neolithic flint-work. Bronze Age pottery along with smaller amounts of Romano-British pottery have also been found on the island.

In 1978, the island, along with the other islands in Langstone harbour were acquired by the Royal Society for the Protection of Birds who turned it into a bird sanctuary. Since that time unauthorised landings have been forbidden.
