= South Binness Island =

Island in Hampshire, United Kingdom

Coordinates: 50.823°N 1.009°W

South Binness Island is an island in Langstone Harbour. It is 600 metres (660 yd) long and up to 240 metres (260 yd) wide but only rises to 2 metres (7 ft) above Ordnance Datum. Archaeological finds include Bronze Age pottery and an unfinished Plano-convex knife.

In 1978 the island along with the other islands in Langstone harbour was acquired by the Royal Society for the Protection of Birds who turned it into a bird sanctuary. Since that time unauthorised landings have been forbidden.

The Island is a nesting site for black-headed gulls and the little tern. In 2008 the island had 4,886 nesting pairs of black-headed gulls and 11 nesting pairs of little terns. None of the little terns managed to raise any young that year something thought to be in part due to the number of black-headed gulls. In 2013 500 tonnes of aggregate was added to a beach on the island in order to raise its height. The hope was that the higher beach would offer little terns more nesting sites high enough to avoid the risk of them being washed away by the tide.
