= West Hayling =

Nature reserve in Hampshire, England

Coordinates: 50.826°N 0.989°W

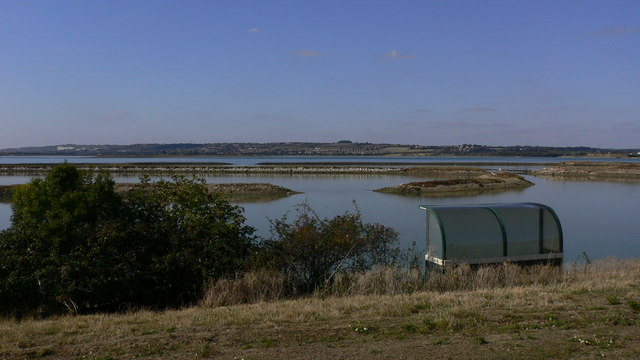
- Interactive map of West Hayling
- Type: Local Nature Reserve
- Location: Hayling Island, Hampshire
- OS grid: SU 713 034
- Area: 76.2 hectares (188 acres)
- Manager: Havant Borough Council and the Royal Society for the Protection of Birds

West Hayling is a 76.2-hectare (188-acre) Local Nature Reserve on Hayling Island in Hampshire. It is owned by Havant Borough Council and managed by the council and the Royal Society for the Protection of Birds. It is part of Langstone Harbour, which is a Site of Special Scientific Interest. It is also part of Solent Maritime Special Area of Conservation and of Chichester and Langstone Harbours Ramsar site and Special Protection Area.

This site has large areas of intertidal mudflats and lagoons with vast numbers of marine invertebrates, which provide food for tens of thousands of wintering and breeding birds.
