= Langstone Harbour =

Site of Special Scientific Interest in Hampshire

Coordinates: 50°49′05″N 01°00′30″W

- Site of Special Scientific Interest
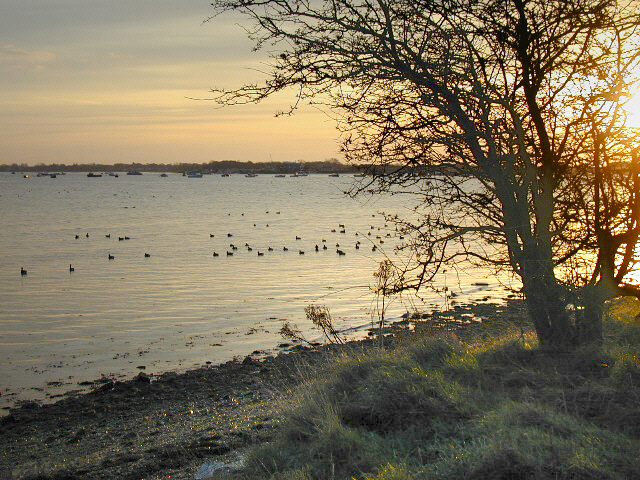
- Location of Langstone Harbour.
- Area of search: Hampshire
- Grid reference: SU 695 025
- Interest: Biological
- Area: 2,085.4 hectares (5,153 acres)
- Notification date: 1985
- Location map: Magic Map

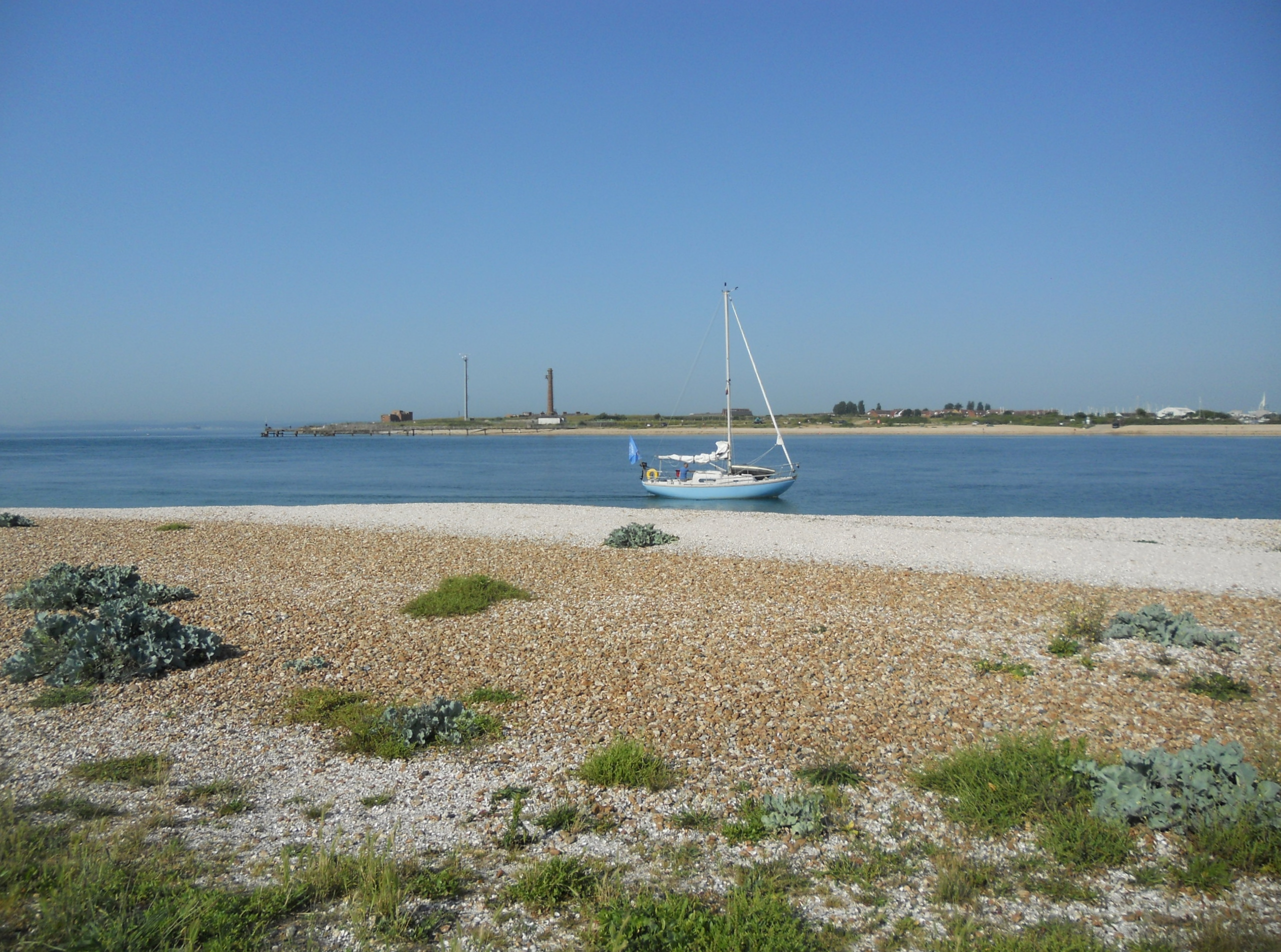
Entrance to Langstone Harbour

Langstone Harbour is a 2,085.4-hectare (5,153-acre) biological Site of Special Scientific Interest in Hampshire. It is an inlet of the English Channel in Hampshire, sandwiched between Portsea Island to the south and west, Hayling Island to the south and east, and Langstone to the north. It is part of the Ramsar site of Langstone and Chichester Harbour Special Protection Area and Nature Conservation Review site. Parts are Special Areas of Conservation, or Local Nature Reserves, and some areas by the Hampshire and Isle of Wight Wildlife Trust.

Historically, the harbour has been used for salt and sand production, as well as fishing and latterly leisure boating. A ferry across the mouth of the harbour has been in operation for more than 200 years.

== Geography ==
Langstone Harbour is an inlet of the English Channel in Hampshire, sandwiched between Portsea Island to the south and west, Hayling Island to the south and east, and Langstone to the north. It is part of the Ramsar site of Langstone and Chichester Harbour, Special Protection Area and Nature Conservation Review site, Grade I. Parts of it are in Solent Maritime and Solent and Isle of Wight Lagoons Special Areas of Conservation. Three areas are Local Nature Reserves, Farlington Marshes West Hayling and The Kench, Hayling Island. Two areas are nature reserves managed by the Hampshire and Isle of Wight Wildlife Trust, Farlington Marshes and Southmoor Nature Reserve

West of Portsmouth is Portsmouth Harbour and the three linked harbours are important recreational and conservation areas as well as supporting commercial fishing and shipping. It is administered by the Langstone Harbour Board. The eastern boundary with Chichester Harbour is defined by a historic causeway known as the Wade Way, which was originally the only crossing between Hayling Island and the mainland. It is now impassable, having been cut in two by a deep channel for the Portsmouth and Arundel Canal in the 1820s (for further information see Langstone).

=== Islands ===
Langstone Harbour contains a number of islands: Baker's Island (SU694035), North Binness Island (SU692046), South Binness Island (SU698031) and Long Island (SU701041). These are subject to erosion and during the 1990s a seven-year archaeology project took place before their history was lost to the seas.

There are two smaller islands: Round Nap Island, which is connected to South Binness Island by a tidal causeway; and Oyster Island, which contains the remains of an old hut, thought to have been built in 1819 to guard the oyster beds.

== History ==
Langstone Harbour was originally a river valley of one of the tributaries flowing into the then River Solent. With the end of the last ice age sea levels rose until sometime between 4000 and 3500BC the harbour took on the form it would have until the 18th century.

For much of its history the harbour has been an area of salt production. The Domesday Book records three salthouses around the harbour and by the early 17th century a saltern at Copnor was well established. Here a large shallow area of the harbour meant that even without further improvement salt could be extracted from the area after each tide. The Copnor saltern ceased production in 1800 but salt production continued elsewhere in the harbour until 1933.

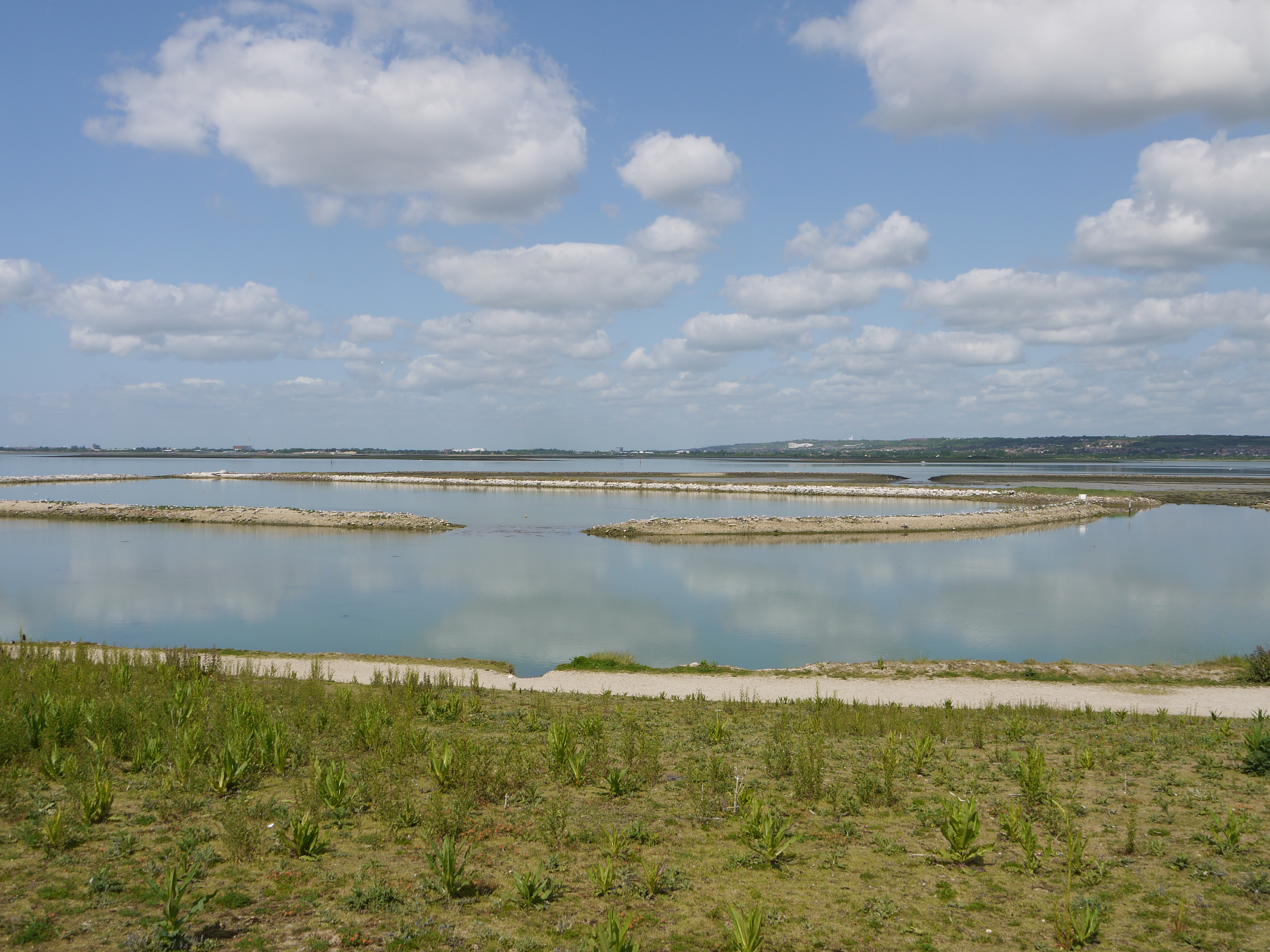
The artificial lagoon built on the remains of the old oyster beds

In 1771 Farlington Marshes were reclaimed from the north of the harbour.

Oyster farming began in the harbour around 1820 with winkle and clam cultivation probably starting around much the same time. Production ceased in the 1950s. An attempt at oyster farming in the 1980s soon failed. In 1997 work began to turn the remains into an artificial lagoon. The lagoon which has a small island at the centre has, as planned, become a breeding ground for birds, particularly little terns. In 2025 work took place to raise the level of the island within the lagoon.

During the Second World War the harbour was used as Starfish decoy site to misdirect German bombers.

The 2,085.4-hectare (5,153-acre) harbour was designated a biological Site of Special Scientific Interest in 1985.

=== Ferry ===
A ferry has operated between Portsmouth and Hayling Island across Langstone Harbour for more than 200 years; in 2022-23 it carried more than 47,000 passengers.

== Wildlife ==
The harbour is home to an extensive range of marine and bird life. Fifty species of fish have been found in the harbour. The harbour's bird life is even richer, the harbour hosting a wide range of species some of which are represented by over 10,000 individuals. This is in a large part due to the Royal Society for the Protection of Birds acquiring islands and a number of tidal areas in 1978 and turning them into bird sanctuaries. As a result of the number of birds the harbour as become a popular spot for bird watchers.

Seals occasionally appear in the harbour in winter. American hard-shelled clams have been found in the harbour spreading from an initial release site on the lower River Test. The harbour is also home to a population of Sand smelt.

On 31 July 2008 a 26-foot (8-metre), 7-tonne northern bottlenose whale was beached on a mudflat in Langstone Harbour. A rescue operation was carried out to try to save the whale off the south coast of England and managed to free the whale from mudflats using a special lifting pontoon but it remained in shallow water. A decision was made to give the whale a lethal injection as a blood test revealed that it was suffering from kidney failure. If the whale swam into deeper water it could take up to two days to die naturally from renal failure. The whale ended up about 3,000 miles (4,800 km) off course due to its illness.

== Water quality ==
The quality of water in the harbour was called into question when samples taken in 2022 were found to contain traces of numerous chemical compounds including prescribed medicines. The harbour has outflow from a water treatment plant.

== Economy ==
In most years since 2011, the harbour made a loss. About a third of its income comes from dredged sand, which is reliant upon a single dredger. In 2023, a government grant of £233,000 would be spent on upgrading facilities for local fishing and leisure boating.

== Wrecks ==
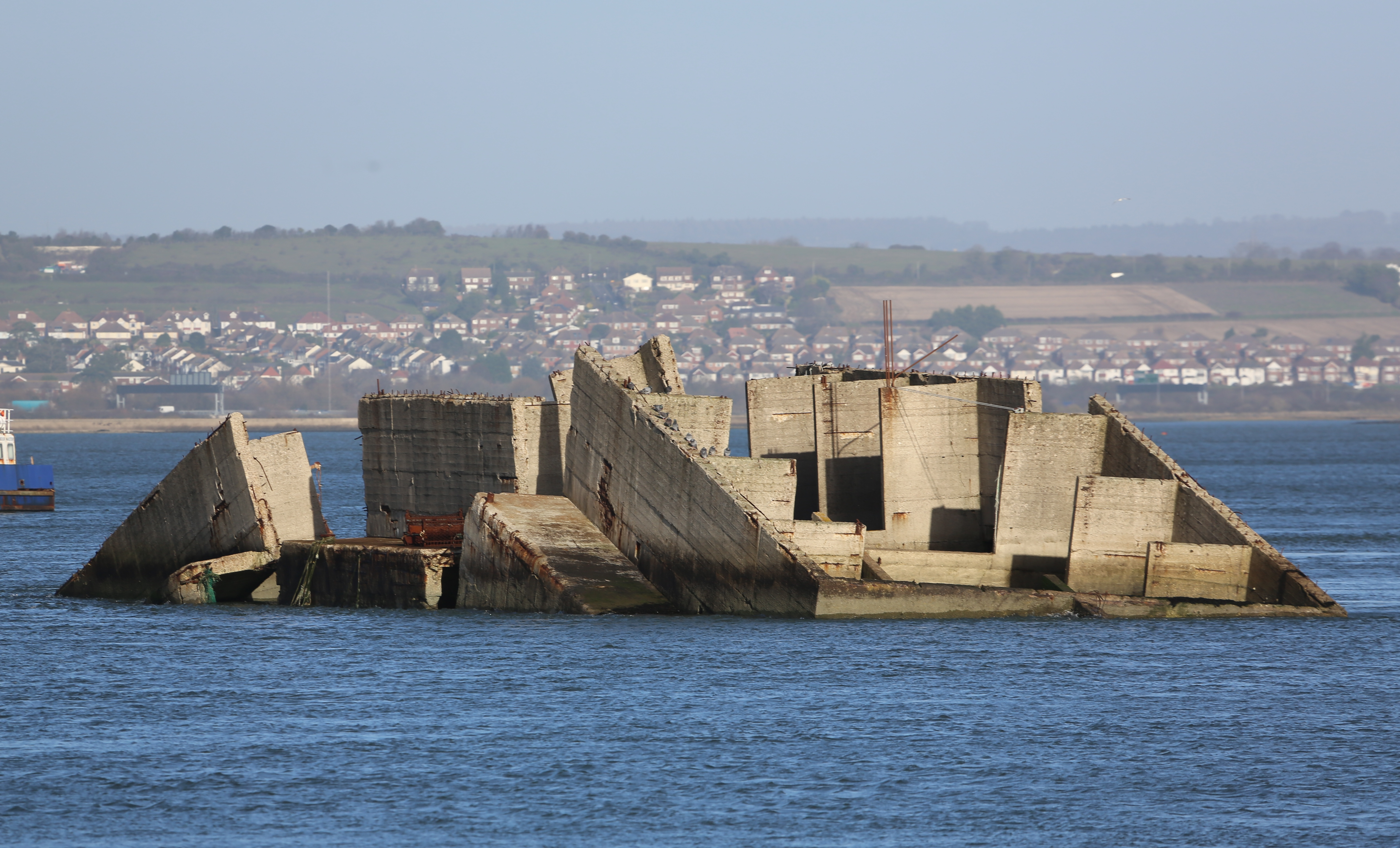
The Phoenix breakwater wreck

There are several boat wrecks in the harbour. One of these is a tug dating from 8 May 1941. The tug named the Irishman was sunk by a magnetic mine and now rests partially submerged at low tide. A slightly older wreck dating from 1926 is a Bucket dredger named the Withern. Of unrecorded age is the wreck of the Excelsior, an 80-foot-long barge. The harbour also contains a wrecked landing craft that rests with its bows almost permanently above the surface.

Close to the entrance of the harbour, there is a wrecked Phoenix breakwater type C. It was originally constructed to form part of a World War 2 Mulberry Harbour.

Various artefacts have been found from the prison hulks that were kept in the harbour during the Napoleonic Wars.
