= Baker's Island =

Island in Langstone Harbour, Hampshire, England

Coordinates: 50.8274°N 1.0145°W

The island viewed from the top of Portsdown Hill

Baker's Island is an island in Langstone Harbour, Hampshire, England. It is 400 m (1,300 ft) long and up to 300 m (980 ft) wide but only rises to a little over 2 m (7 ft) above Ordnance Datum. Mesolithic and Neolithic flintwork has been found on the island along with Bronze Age and Romano-British pottery. There are a number of structures on the island including the remains of a flint walled building and five 5 by 1.5 m (16.4 by 4.9 ft) brick shelters believed to be part of a World War Two starfish decoy site. In 1978 the island along with the other islands in Langstone Harbour was acquired by the Royal Society for the Protection of Birds who turned it into a bird sanctuary. Since that time unauthorised landings have been forbidden.
