= Miguel =

Miguel is a given name and surname, the Portuguese and Spanish form of the Hebrew name Michael. It may refer to:

== People ==
- Miguel (surname)

=== Arts, entertainment, and media ===
==== Actors ====
- Miguel Bosé (born 1956), Spanish pop new wave musician and actor
- Miguel Córcega (1929–2008), Mexican actor and director
- Miguel Ferrer (1955–2017), American actor
- Miguel Galván (1957–2008), Mexican actor
- Miguel Ángel Landa (born 1936), Venezuelan actor, stand-up comedian, and television personality
- Miguel Ríos (born 1944), Spanish singer and actor
- Miguel Sandoval (born 1951), American film and television actor
- Miguel Ángel Silvestre (born 1982), Spanish actor

==== Musicians ====
- Miguel (singer) (born 1985), Miguel Jontel Pimentel, American recording artist
- Miguel Bosé (born 1956), Spanish pop new wave musician and actor
- Miguel Cancel (born 1968), former American singer
- Miguel Ríos (born 1944), Spanish singer and actor

==== Writers ====
- Miguel Calderón (born 1971), artist and writer
- Miguel de Cervantes (1547–1616), Spanish author
- Miguel Delibes (1920–2010), Spanish novelist
- Miguel Mihura (1905–1977), Spanish absurdist playwright
- Miguel Morayta (1907–2013), Spanish film director and screenwriter

==== Other occupations in the arts and media ====
- Miguel Calderón (born 1971), artist and writer
- Miguel Córcega (1929–2008), Mexican actor and director
- Miguel Gómez (photographer) (born 1974), Colombian / American photographer
- Miguel Ángel Landa (born 1936), Venezuelan actor, stand-up comedian, and television personality
- Miguel Morayta (1907–2013), Spanish film director and screenwriter
- Miguel Ocampo (1922–2015), Argentine painter and diplomat

=== Politics ===
- Miguel Boyer (1939–2014), Spanish politician
- Miguel Brugueras (1939–2006), Cuban politician and diplomat
- Miguel Díaz-Canel (born 1960), First Secretary of the Communist Party of Cuba since 2021
- Miguel Hidalgo y Costilla (1753–1811), Mexican priest and revolutionary rebel leader
- Miguel Lombardi (born 1964), Brazilian politician
- Miguel Martinez (born 1978), Dominican-American New York City Council member, convicted of conspiracy, sentenced to five years in prison
- Miguel López Perito, Paraguayan politician
- Miguel Malvar (1865–1911), Filipino revolutionary and president of the Philippines
- Miguel Maura (1887–1971), Spanish politician
- Miguel Portas (1958–2012), Portuguese politician
- Miguel Santa Lucía Ojopi Sosa (born 1967), Bolivian businessman and politician
- Juan Miguel "Migz" Fernandez Zubiri (born 1969), Filipino politician

=== Portuguese royalty ===
- Miguel of Portugal (1802–1866), King of Portugal
- Miguel, Duke of Braganza (1853–1927), Portuguese pretender, son of King Miguel I
- Prince Miguel, Duke of Viseu (1878–1923), Portuguese prince, older son of Miguel II
- Miguel da Paz (1498–1500), older son of King Manuel I of Portugal
- Infante Miguel de Bragança (1699–1724), natural son of King Pedro II of Portugal
- Miguel, Prince of Beira

=== Sports ===
==== Baseball ====
- Miguel Andújar (born 1995), Dominican Republic professional baseball player
- Miguel Cabrera (born 1983), Venezuelan professional baseball player
- Miguel González (pitcher) (born 1984), Mexican professional baseball player
- Miguel Montero (born 1983), Venezuelan-American former professional baseball player
- Miguel Sanó (born 1993), Dominican Republic professional baseball player
- Miguel Tejada (born 1974), Dominican Republic former professional baseball player
- Miguel Yajure (born 1998), Venezuelan professional baseball player

==== Cycling ====
- Miguel Induráin (born 1964), Spanish cyclist
- Miguel Ángel Niño (born 1968), Colombian road cyclist
- Miguel Ángel Sanabria (1967–2006), Colombian road cyclist
- Miguel Ubeto (born 1976), Venezuelan road cyclist

==== Football (soccer) ====
- Miguel Comminges (born 1982), Guadeloupean footballer
- Miguel Molina (footballer) (born 1993), Spanish football coach
- Miguel Monteiro (born 1980), Portuguese footballer, known as "Miguel"
- Miguel Montes (footballer, born 1980) (born 1980), Salvadoran footballer
- Miguel Ponce (born 1971), Chilean footballer
- Miguel Sanabria (born 1964), Paraguayan footballer
- Miguel Veloso (born 1986), Portuguese footballer

==== Other sports ====
- Nigel Miguel (born 1963), Belizean/American actor, film producer, film commissioner, former basketball player
- Miguel Canto (1948–2026), Mexican boxing champion
- Miguel Cotto (born 1980), Puerto Rican boxer
- Miguel Duhamel (born 1968), Canadian motorcycle racer
- Miguel Maia (born 1971), Portuguese beach volleyball player
- Miguel Queiroz (basketball) (born 1991), Portuguese basketballer

=== Other people ===
- Miguel Vicente de Abreu (1827–1883), Goan historian
- Miguel Benzo Perea (born 1951), Spanish journalist and diplomat
- Miguel Casiri (1710–1791), Spanish academic and orientalist
- Miguel Dongil y Sánchez (born 1987), Spanish historian
- Miguel de Icaza (born 1972), Mexican software developer and GNOME founder
- Wanigamuni Miguel Mendes Wimalarathna (1823–1890), Sri Lankan Sinhala Buddhist orator
- Miguel Patricio (born 1966/1967), Portuguese businessman
- Miguel Rodríguez Orejuela (born 1943), cofounder of the Cali cartel
- Miguel Sánchez (priest) (1594–1674), novohispanic priest, writer and theologician
- Miguel de Unamuno (1864–1936), Spanish philosopher
- Miguel Ángel Félix Gallardo (born 1946), Mexican drug lord

== Fictional entities ==
- Miguel, a character in the animated series Beyblade G Revolution
- Miguel, a bullfighter in the fighting game Human Killing Machine
- Miguel, a protagonist in the DreamWorks animated film The Road to El Dorado
- Miguel, a character in the TV series The Walking Dead
- Miguel Lopez-Fitzgerald, a regular character on the soap opera Passions
- Miguel O'Hara, the secret identity of Spider-Man 2099
- Miguel Cassidy, the youngest Cassidy child from Dino Ranch
- Miguel Prado, a character played by Jimmy Smits during the third season of the TV series Dexter
- Miguel Rivas, a character in the television series This Is Us
- Miguel Caballero Rojo, a character from the Tekken video game series
- Miguel Diaz from Cobra Kai
- Miguel Santos, Maya's brother and co-titular protagonist in the PBS animated series Maya & Miguel
- Don Miguel, a notorious 19th-century whale mentioned in Moby-Dick
- Miguel Rivera, the protagonist in the Pixar animated film Coco
- Miguel, a blue down-to-earth, active and energetic Anubis chihuahua from Rainbow Butterfly Unicorn Kitty

== Places ==
- Pedro Miguel (Horta), a parish in the municipality of Horta and the island of Faial in the Azores Islands
- São Miguel (disambiguation), various locations in Azores, Portugal, Brazil and Cape Verde

== Other uses ==
- Miguel Street, a semi-autobiographical novel by V. S. Naipaul, published in 1959
- Miguel (album), a 1957 album by Dalida
- Miguel (TV series), an Israeli drama television series

== See also ==
- Michel (disambiguation)
- San Miguel (disambiguation)
- Miguel Pérez (disambiguation)
