= Miguel Pérez =

Miguel Pérez may refer to:

== Arts and entertainment ==
- Miguel Perez (American actor) (born 1957), American television actor
- Miguel Pérez Alvarado (born 1979), Spanish poet
- Miguel Pérez (Mexican actor) (born 1993), Mexican television actor

== Sports ==
=== Association football (soccer) ===
- Miguel Pérez (footballer, born 1945), Ecuadorian footballer
- Miguel Pérez (footballer, born 1947), Spanish footballer
- Miguel Pérez (footballer, born 1980), Spanish footballer
- Michu (Miguel Pérez Cuesta, born 1986), Spanish footballer
- Miguel Perez (soccer, born 2005), American soccer player

=== Other sports ===
- Miguel Pérez (cyclist) (born 1934), Mexican cyclist
- Miguel Pérez (wrestler) (1937–2005), Puerto Rican wrestler
- Miguel Ángel Pérez Tello (born 1957), Spanish Paralympic cyclist and skier
- Miguel Pérez Jr. (born 1966), Puerto Rican wrestler
- Miguel Pérez (water polo) (born 1967), Spanish water polo player
- Miguel Pérez (baseball) (born 1983), Venezuelan baseball player

== Others ==
- Miguel Pérez de Almazán (died 1514), Spanish hidalgo
- Miguel Pérez Cevallos (died 1681), Spanish bishop
- Miguel Pérez Carreño (1904-1966), Venezuelan physician
- Miguel Pérez Villar (1945–2022), Spanish businessman and politician

== See also ==
- José Miguel Pérez (disambiguation)
