= Bruguera =

Bruguera (Catalan pronunciation: [bɾuˈɣeɾə]) is a Catalan surname. It may refer to:

- Editorial Bruguera, a Spanish publishing company
- Josep Llimona i Bruguera (1864–1934), Catalan sculptor
- Maria Pilar Bruguera Sábat (1906–1994), Spanish nun and medical doctor
- Miguel Brugueras (1939–2006), Cuban politician and diplomat
- Sergi Bruguera (born 1971), Spanish tennis player
- Tania Bruguera (born 1968), Cuban artist

== See also ==
- Brugnera, a comune in the province of Pordenone, Italy
- Bruguiera, a plant genus in the family Rhizophoraceae
