= Yoshua Okón =

Mexican artist

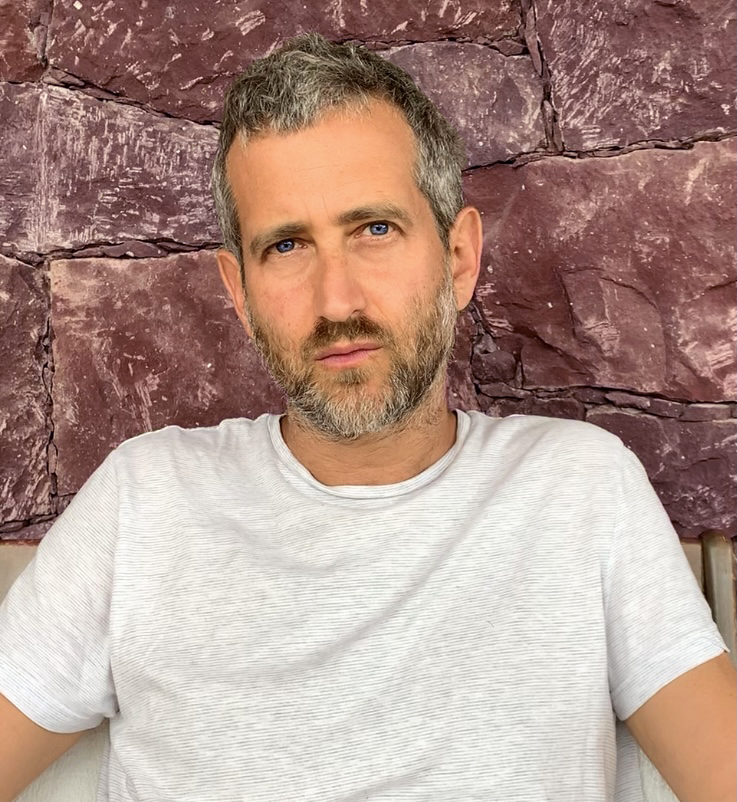
- Born: 1970 (age 55–56); Mexico City
- Education: Concordia University, University of California, Los Angeles
- Occupations: Video artist, installation artist
- Awards: Fulbright Program (2000–2002)
- Website: www.yoshuaokon.com

Yoshua Okón (Mexico City, 1970) is a Mexican artist whose work is part of major art collections throughout the world. He is co-founder of La Panadería, an art space that operated between 1994 and 2002, and of SOMA, a contemporary art school. Mexican art critic Cuauhtémoc Medina points out that Okón burst onto the Mexican art scene as a child prodigy. At age twenty-seven he produced works that promptly gained iconic value such as “A propósito” (1997), a sculpture made with 120 stolen car stereos obtained on the black market accompanied by a video in which Okón and Miguel Calderón steal a car stereo, and “Chocorrol” (1997). a visual registry of copulation between a xoloiztcuintle dog and a French poodle. Okón’s work blends staged situations, documentation and improvisation, and questions habitual perceptions of reality and truth, selfhood and morality.

== Education ==
Okón studied a BFA at Concordia University in Montreal. He later attended UCLA on a Fulbright scholarship where he received an MFA.

== Work ==
Although video has been predominant in Yoshua Okón’s practice, his work has also explored sculpture, drawing, painting and installation. As artist Paul MacCarthy has described, the Mexican artist’s practice cannot be classified into notions such as “video art” or “expanded cinema”, because the works have a physical presence that links them directly to sculpture and installation, “with the purpose of the viewer making some kind of association. So, it means that the work involves video, and the video is then placed into some type of situation.”

According to art historian Helena Chávez MacGregor, Okón’s work situates us within the realm of the absurd as a critical and political strategy. His work experiments and redeploys the structured ambivalence of today’s world in order to turn the work of art into a tool for sabotaging common sense. Chávez MacGregor also mentions that it is important to place Okón’s work in a context of market deregulation, where neoliberal policies and the narrative of globalization allowed artists of his generation to no longer be governed by the national or by an old leftist tradition (co-opted in Mexico by the Institutional Revolutionary Party). This is relevant because it sets the parameters to understand more clearly the political nature of his production, which deliberately moves away from a militant agenda, to concentrate on fissuring, breaking and unsettling the rules of the status quo.

In later years, Okón has taken a different approach with his work. “The irony that served as a form of rebellion in the nineties later became a sophisticated means of unveiling. In his early works, forms of tension –whether racial, class-based, or political– operated as mirrors reflecting viewers’ social prejudices back at them. In more recent works, the intervention lies in puncturing these reflective surfaces in order to connect different processes, draw constellations of political and affective territories, and show how the most intimate aspect of our being is part of a complex domination machine.” “My own involvement and that of the audience are fundamental. From the hyper-local, my work tends to be a critique of the structural violence of dominant mainstream culture. We all inhabit capitalism; I’m not interested in doing moralistic or didactic work. I prefer to get into the mud; my works speak from that place, from a place where we are necessarily and inevitably part of the representation that is being presented.” Joining a tradition of highly directed situations that fuse social reality with carefully calculated artifice, participants in Okón’s works represent themselves as players in an interconnected and interdependent constellation in which we all participate: “I am interested in exploring the extent to which historical, economic and political forces define us all, the extent to which we are determined by our systems”, says Okón himself about his work. The artist recalls that his work tends to be a critique through laughter. The use of humor, although harsh and dark, is aimed at reflection, so his critical position can be considered satirical, but not cynical. Okón accepts that misused humor can trivialize the discussion, but if one manages to transcend its superficiality it can be a profound, critical and productive tool. “The moment you laugh you are inside, you are engaged and questioning who you are, and it is harder to dismiss what is being presented... you are already laughing at yourself. Black uncomfortable humor can be self-reflexive. In Walter Benjamin’s words: “there's no better trigger for thinking than laughter”.

John C. Welchman comments on the political scope of Okón’s work, as he focuses on issues of conflict and violence: “Ranging in one dimension from street disputes to out and out war and in another from domestic to institutional locations, questions of conflict and violence have long been central to the work of Yoshua Okón. One might say that the artist has organized his engagement with the social and political economies of conflict as kind of operating system for the edgy compound of irony, assumption, voyeurism and critique that underwrites his working method.”

According to Andrew Berardini, Okón’s work, “rather than making us feel good about his social collaboration, the artist and his collaborators turns around and delivers our preconceived notions back to us as a very dark kind of comedy, where the jokes and pantomimes made by the community show them playing with their own negative stereotypes”.

== La Panadería ==
In collaboration with Miguel Calderón, Okón founded La Panadería (1994-2022), a meeting and gathering place for artists that would eventually become one of the most renowned independent spaces that defined the art scene of the 90’s in Mexico and cemented the artistic canon today.

Okón recalls: “In April 1994, at the age of 23 and after three years of art studies in Montreal, I returned to Mexico City. Upon arrival, I settled in an old three-story building in the then decaying Condesa neighborhood. The building had once housed a bakery that my parents had bought a year earlier. Both the neighborhood and the building turned out to be the most suitable place to carry out the project that, together with Miguel Calderón, we had planned during the last three summers in Mexico –inspired in part by independent spaces in Canada (Système Parallèle), in San Francisco (ATA) and in Mexico City itself, La Quiñonera and Temístocles.”

While La Panadería quickly gained visibility for its innovative exhibitions, the space also operated as an artist’s residence, film club, concert hall, performance space for artist presentations and memorable parties.

In essence, Okón explains, La Panadería was founded as an unconventional space for artists that was not limited to exhibiting work, but had the primary idea of “using space (and art) as a tool to transform our way of life.”

La Panadería ran uninterruptedly for nine years and hundreds of national and foreign artists passed through it, artists who would eventually become part of the global art canon. Writer Guillermo Fadanelli efficiently summarizes its legacy: “La Panadería, as a physical nucleus that has expanded in all directions, had an uncommon freedom as foundation when it came to proposing exhibitions and carrying them out.”

== SOMA ==
In 2009, Yoshua Okón convened a group of 19 artists to found a unique platform. Soma is a non-profit association that seeks to provoke reflection and discussion, plural and horizontal, of the different events that define art and culture on a national and international scale. A space to collectively investigate, outside the academy and the market, what art can be and how it can function in different contexts. It operates from three core programs, which are either free or operate with scholarships that go from 90% to 100%: Soma Educational Program (PES), Miércoles de Soma and Soma Summer.

Motivated by the same interests that in the 90’s drove the creation of independent spaces such as La Panadería and Temístocles 44, Soma’s mission is to create the conditions for creative collaboration among peers, horizontal learning and the critical exchange of ideas and knowledge among different artistic and cultural agents. To provide tools to ensure that, regardless of social origin, economic context, gender, discipline or age, those who are dedicated to culture and art can articulate and debate their positions, discourses and actions within the artistic field. According to Okón, “Soma was created and exists because there is a lack of platforms for interaction in the artistic community. I believe that in the last ten years (2000-2010) the art scene has tended, increasingly, towards individualistic practices in which most artists catered for the demands of the market".

== Selected artworks ==
Bocanegra, 2007

Yoshua Okón collaborated with a group of the Third Reich Mexican amateurs, an odd amalgam of World War II history buffs, insignia fetishists, and weekend hobbyists. The title “Bocanegra” refers to the street in Mexico City where the group holds weekly meetings, named for the Francisco González Bocanegra, librettist of the Mexican National Anthem which begins with the verse, “Mexicanos, al grito de guerra” [“Mexicans, at the cry of war”]. Working as a kind of participant observer, Okón escalated his firsthand observations of the group into a semicollaborative action as members agreed to participate in a series of orchestrated situations, which were recorded on video.

Canned Laughter, 2009

The starting point for Canned Laughter was an invitation in which several artists were asked to create work in response to their experience in Ciudad Juárez. The piece considers this city within its role in the global context. All aspects of a corporate image are developed in order to achieve a detailed construction of a fake maquiladora that produces canned laughter for Hollywood comedies. Dozens of former maquiladora workers were hired both as part of the research process and as actors (maquiladoras are inaccessible places so it is difficult to know what goes on inside). Canned Laughter alludes both to the processes of mechanization and slavery in the age of globalization and to the impossibility of transmitting and reproducing emotions through electronic media.

Art critic Cuauhtémoc Medina points out that it has been Yoshua Okón’s most direct allegory of neoliberal production. “In his work, he assimilates the idea of the maquiladora into an international production of diversified laughter, but ultimately what he does is suggest that this export, this trade, has to do with canning a kind of welfare element. Something that socialist realism sought -to compel a kind of happiness and applause generated by authoritarianism- suddenly becomes the exportable product you are alluding to. But, at the same time, this piece raises the question of where humor takes place.”

Oracle, 2015

In 2014, in the town of Oracle, Arizona, a huge protest was held against the entry of children from Central America into the United States. Okón spoke with the leaders who organized the protest, members of the Arizona Border Defenders, a militia made up of former military and police officers who agreed to create fictional scenes based on their ultra-nationalist ideology and a reenactment of the protest. The title also refers to Oracle Corporation, a company known for its strong ties to the CIA and a perfect example of the current geopolitical paradigm where state structures are increasingly at the service of private corporate interests. Oracle questions the relevance of nationalism in this transnational era, an ideology that has taken root to such a degree that it spreads across the political spectrum, becoming invisible.

The Toilet, 2017

In collaboration with Santiago Sierra, The Toilet is a luxury functional toilet in the shape of the Soumaya Museum in Mexico City. This piece appropriates that building as a symbol of corporate power.

The artist points out that attention must be paid to the subject of businessmen who accumulate such incredibly disproportionate fortunes, as lack of quality of life is the source of problems such as violence, organized crime, and mass migration. According to the newspaper El Economista, Carlos Slim has more money than the rest of all Mexicans combined, and these great riches have as a background an enormous exploitation of both humans and the environment.

== Exhibitions and collections ==
Okón has had solo exhibitions at Hammer Museum, MUAC, Museo Amparo, Viafarini, Galerie Mor Charpentier, ASU Art Museum, Blaffer Museum, Ghebaly Gallery, and Colby Museum, among others.

His work has been collected by museums such as the Tate Modern, Hammer Museum, LACMA, Fundación ARCO, National Gallery of Victoria, Colección Jumex, and Museo Universitario de Arte Contemporáneo. He has participated in the biennials of Istanbul, Manifesta, and Havana, among others.
