= NTCP8 =

NTCP8 may refer to:

- A SMS language abbreviation for "anticipate"
- NTCP8 also is a loci, an element of a gene (allele)
