= La Panadería =

Former art gallery

- Established: 1994
- Dissolved: 2002
- Location: 159 Ámsterdam Avenue, Colonia Condesa, Mexico City, Mexico
- Coordinates: 19.4103064°N 99.1719729°W
- Type: Contemporary art gallery
- Founders: Yoshua Okón, Miguel Calderón

La Panadería (in English: The Bakery) was a contemporary art gallery located in Mexico City founded in 1994 by artists Yoshua Okón and Miguel Calderón. It represented a singular role in the artistic creation of Mexico in the late nineties due to hosting and promoting expressions traditionally relegated from institutional circuits. La Panadería became a reference point for the creative community in the city due to its alternative vocation.

Established in an old bakery, it hosted early work from artists such as Carlos Amorales, Gabriel Orozco, and SEMEFO project. In addition to the exhibition space for artistic expression in different disciplines, La Panadería had a residency program for foreign artists. Until 2002 the gallery was located at 159 Ámsterdam Avenue in Colonia Condesa.
