= SMS language =

Abbreviated slang used in text messaging

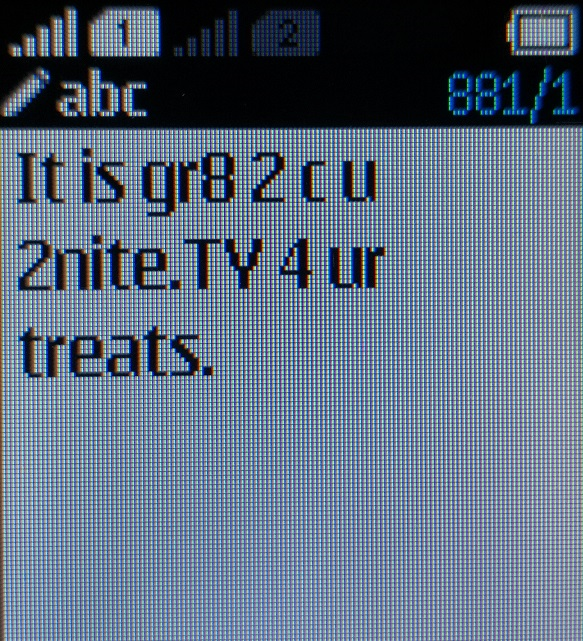
SMS language displayed on a mobile phone screen

Short Message Service (SMS) language or textese (Note: also known as txt-speak, txtese, chatspeak, txt, txtspk, txtk, txto, texting language, txt lingo, SMSish, txtslang, txt talk, text shorthand) is the abbreviated language and slang commonly used in the late 1990s and early 2000s with mobile phone text messaging, and occasionally through Internet-based communication such as email and instant messaging. Many call the words used in texting "textisms" or "Internet slang."

Features of early mobile phone messaging encouraged users to use abbreviations. 2G technology made text entry difficult, requiring multiple key presses on a small keypad to generate each letter, and messages were generally limited to 160 bytes (or 1280 bits). Additionally, SMS language made text messages quicker to type, while also avoiding additional charges from mobile network providers for lengthy messages exceeding 160 characters.

== History ==
SMS language is similar to telegraphs' language where charges were by the word. It seeks to use the fewest letters to produce ultra-concise words and sentiments in dealing with the space, time, and cost constraints of text messaging. It follows from how early SMS permitted only 160 characters and that carriers began charging a small fee for each message sent (and sometimes received). Together with the difficulty and inefficiency in creating messages, it led the desire for a more economical language for the new medium.

SMS language also shares some of these characteristics with Internet slang and Telex speak, as it evolved alongside the use of shorthand in Internet chat rooms. Likewise, such a change sought to accommodate the small number of characters allowed per message, and to increase convenience for the time-consuming and often small keyboards on mobile phones. Similar elliptical styles of writing can be traced to the days of telegraphese 120 years back, when telegraph operators were reported to use abbreviations similar to modern text when chatting amongst themselves in between the sending of official messages. Faramerz Dabhoiwala wrote in The Guardian in 2016: "modern usages that horrify linguistic purists in fact have deep historical roots. 'OMG' was used by a septuagenarian naval hero, admiral of the fleet John Fisher, 1st Baron Fisher in a letter to Winston Churchill, in 1917".

In general, SMS language thus permits the sender to type less and communicate more quickly than one could without such shortcuts. One example is the use of "tmr" instead of "tomorrow". Nevertheless, there are no standard rules for the creation and use of SMS languages. Any word may be shortened (for example, "text" to "txt"). Words can also be combined with numbers to make them shorter (for example, "later" to "l8r"), using the numeral "8" for its homophonic quality.

=== SMS language as a multilingual entity ===
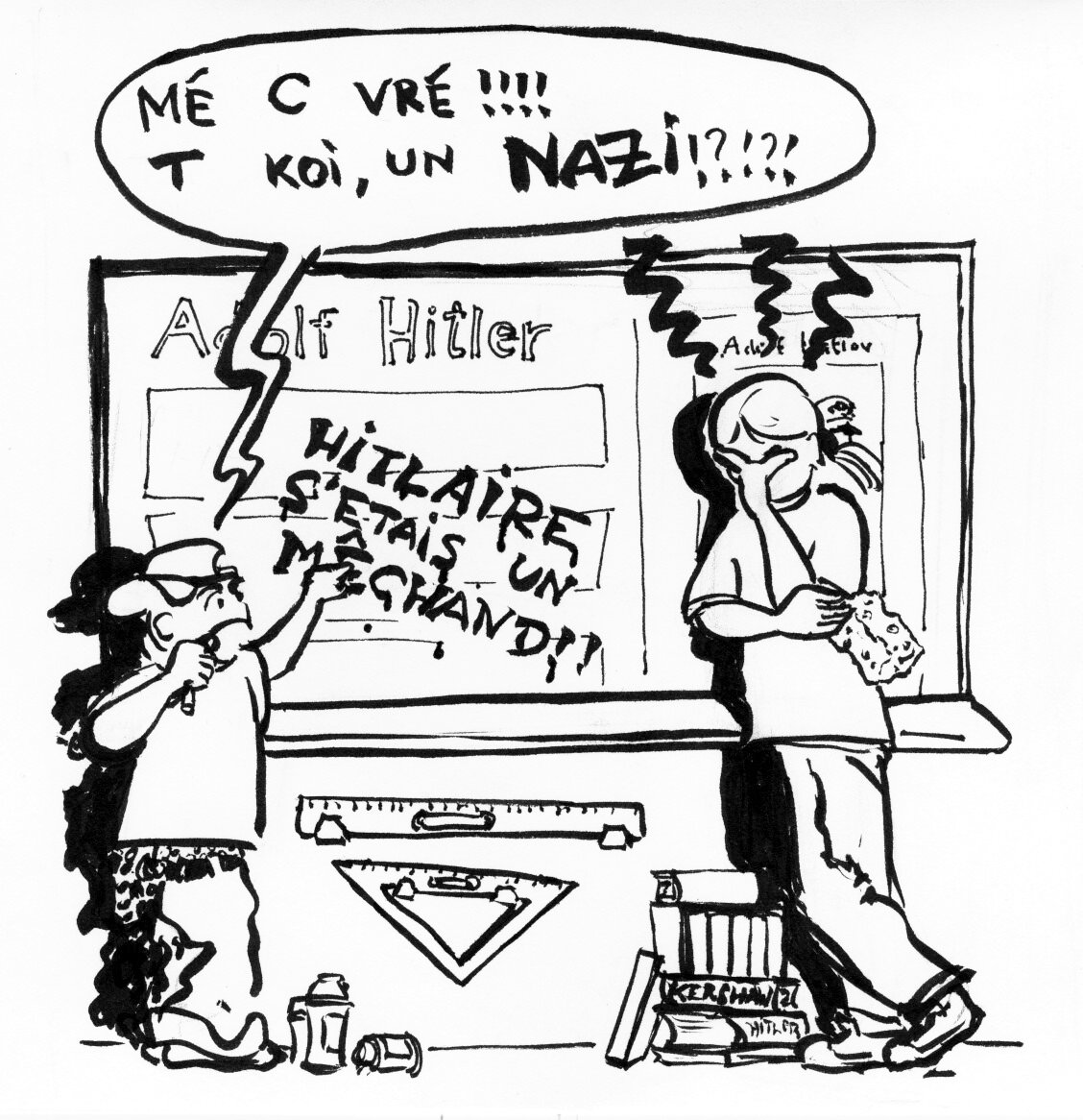
French comic featuring SMS language. The child's speech (in full French spelling, "Mais c'est vrai ! T'es quoi, un nazi ?", translated as "But it's true! What are you, a Nazi?") is written in French SMS abbreviations.

Some may view SMS language to be a dialect of the English language, that is a dialect strongly if not completely derivative of the English language. This may not be so. Such generalization may have risen from the fact that mobile phones had only been able to support a limited number of default languages in the early stages of its conception and distribution.

A mobile operating system (OS) such as Symbian and language packs enable the linguistic localization of products that are equipped with such interfaces, where the final Symbian release (Symbian Belle) supported the scripts and orthographies of over 48 languages and dialects, though such provisions are by no means fully comprehensive as to the languages used by users all over the world.

Nevertheless, various factors contribute as additional constraints to the use of non-English languages and scripts in SMS. This motivates the anglicization of such languages, especially those using non-Latin orthographies (i.e. not using Latin alphabets) following for instance, the even more limited message lengths involved when using for example, Cyrillic or Greek letters. On the other side, researcher Gillian Perrett observes the de-anglicization of the English language following its use and incorporation into non-English linguistic contexts.

As such, on top of the measures taken to minimize space, time and cost constraints in SMS language, further constraints upon the varied nature and characteristics of languages worldwide add to the distinct properties and style of SMS language(s).

== Linguistic properties and style ==
The primary motivation for the creation and use of SMS language was to convey a comprehensible message using the fewest characters possible. This was for two reasons: first of all, telecommunication companies limited the number of characters per SMS and charged the user per SMS sent. To keep costs down, users had to find a way of being concise while still communicating the desired message. Secondly, typing on a phone is normally slower than with a keyboard, and capitalization is even slower. As a result, punctuation, grammar, and capitalization are largely ignored.

The advent of touchscreen phones with large screens, swipe-based input methods and increasingly advanced autocomplete and spelling suggestion functionality, as well as the increasing popularity of free-to-use instant messaging systems like WhatsApp over pay-per-message SMS has decreased the need to use SMS language.

Observations and classifications as to the linguistic and stylistic properties of SMS language have been made and proposed by Crispin Thurlow, López Rúa, and David Crystal. Although they are by no means exhaustive, some of these properties involve the use of:

- Initializations (acronyms and abbreviations composed of initials)
- Reductions and shortenings, and omission of parts of speech
  - Pragmatics and context in interpretation of ambiguous shortenings
- Reactive tokens
- Pictograms and logograms (rebus abbreviation)
- Paralinguistic and prosodic features
  - Capitalization
  - Emoticons
- Variations in spelling
- Punctuation, or lack thereof

=== Initializations (acronyms and abbreviations composed of initials) ===
There are many examples of words or phrases that share the same abbreviations (e.g., lol could mean laugh out loud, lots of love, or little old lady, and cryn could mean crayon or cryin(g)).

=== Reductions and shortenings, and omission of parts of speech ===
For words that have no common abbreviation, users most commonly remove the vowels from a word, and the reader is required to interpret a string of consonants by re-adding the vowels (e.g., dictionary becomes dctnry and keyboard becomes kybrd). Omission of words, especially function words (e.g., determiners like "a" and "the") are also employed as part of the effort to overcome time and space constraints.

The advent of predictive text input and smartphones featuring full QWERTY keyboards may contribute to a reduction in the use of shortenings in SMS language.

==== Pragmatics and context in interpretation of ambiguous shortenings ====
Recipients may have to interpret the abbreviated words depending on the context in which they are being used. For instance, should someone use ttyl, lol they may mean talk to you later, lots of love as opposed to talk to you later, laugh out loud. In another instance, if someone were to use omg, lol they may mean oh my god, laugh out loud as opposed to oh my god, lots of love.

Therefore, context is crucial when interpreting textese, and it is precisely this shortfall that critics cite as a reason not to use it (although the English language in general, like many other languages, has many words that have different meanings in different contexts).

SMS language does not always obey or follow standard grammar, and additionally the words used are not usually found in standard dictionaries or recognized by language academies.

A 2024 study found that using abbreviations in texting makes the sender seem less sincere, and leads to fewer replies.

=== Reactive tokens ===
The feature of "reactive tokens" that is ubiquitous in Internet Relay Chat (IRC), is also commonly found in SMS language. Reactive tokens include phrases or words like "yeah I know", which signifies a reaction to a previous message. In SMS language, however, the difference is that many words are shortened unlike in spoken speech.

=== Pictograms and logograms (rebus abbreviation) ===
Some tokens of the SMS language can be likened to a rebus, using pictures and single letters or numbers to represent whole words (e.g., "i <3 u", which uses the pictogram of a heart for love, and the letter u replaces you).

The dialect has a few hieroglyphs (codes comprehensible to initiates) and a range of face symbols.

=== Paralinguistic and prosodic features ===
Prosodic features in SMS language aim to provide added semantic and syntactic information and context from which recipients can use to deduce a more contextually relevant and accurate interpretation. These may aim to convey the textual equivalent of verbal prosodic features such as facial expression and tone of voice. Indeed, even though SMS language exists in the format of written text, it closely resembles normal speech in that it does not have a complicated structure and that its meaning is greatly contextualised.

==== Capitalization ====
In the case of capitalization in SMS language, there are three scenarios:

- No capitalization
- Capitalization of only the first word
- Full capitalization as appropriate that conforms to all grammatical rules

Most SMS messages have done away with capitalization. Use of capitalizations on the first word of a message may in fact, not be intentional, and may likely be due to the default capitalization setting of devices. Capitalization too may encode prosodic elements, where copious use may signify the textual equivalent of raised voice to indicate heightened emotion.

==== Emoji, asterisk emoting, and emoticons ====
Just as body language and facial expressions can alter how speech is perceived, emoji and emoticons can alter the meaning of a text message, the difference being that the real tone of the SMS sender is less easily discerned merely by the emoticon. Using a smiling face can be perceived as being sarcastic rather than happy, thus the reader has to decide which it is by looking at the whole message.

Use of punctuation and capitalization to form emoticons distracts from the more traditional function of such features and symbols. Nevertheless, uses do differ across individuals and cultures. For example, overpunctuation may simply be used to communicate paralinguistic aspects of communication without the need to create an emotion from it like so: "Hello!!!!".

=== Punctuation, or lack thereof ===
While vowels and punctuation of words in SMS language are generally omitted, David Crystal observes that apostrophes occur unusually frequently. He cites an American study of 544 messages, where the occurrence of apostrophes in SMS language is approximately 35 percent. This is unexpected, seeing that it is a hassle to input an apostrophe in a text message with the multiple steps involved. The use of apostrophes cannot be attributed to users attempting to disambiguate words that might otherwise be misunderstood without it.

There are few cases in English where leaving out the apostrophe causes misunderstanding of the message. For example, "we're" without the apostrophe could be misread as "were". Even so, these are mostly understood correctly despite being ambiguous, as readers can rely on other cues such as part of sentence and context where the word appears to decide what the word should be. For many other words like "Im" and "Shes", there is no ambiguity. Since users don't need to use apostrophes to ensure that their message is understood accurately, this phenomenon may in part be attributed to texters wanting to maintain clarity so that the message can be more easily understood in a shorter amount of time. The widespread mobile phone auto-correct feature contributes to the frequency of the apostrophe in SMS messages, since, even without user awareness, it will insert an apostrophe in many common words, such as "I'm", "I'll", and "I'd".

=== Variations in spelling ===
Users may also use spellings that reflect their illocutionary force and intention rather than using the standard spelling. For example, the use of "haha" to signify "standard" laughter, and "muahaha" to encode perhaps more raucous or evil sound of laughter.

In this, regional variations in spelling can also be observed. As such, SMS language, with its intergroup variations, also serves as an identity marker.

== Conventional examples and vocabulary ==
=== SMS dictionaries ===
SMS language has yet to be accepted as a conventional and stable form, either as a dialect or as a language. As a result, (as much as it is also a consequence), notable lexicographical efforts and publications (e.g., dictionaries) dealing specifically with SMS language have yet to emerge. Some experts have suggested that the usage of "ungrammatical" text message slang has enabled SMS to become a part of "normal language" for many children.

Many informal attempts at documenting SMS have been done. For example, service provider Vodacom provides its clients with an SMS dictionary as a supplement to their cell phone purchase. Vodacom provides lists of abbreviations and acronyms with their meanings in its web site.

Many other efforts have been made to provide SMS dictionaries on the Internet. Usually an alphabetical list of "words" used in SMS language is provided, along with their intended meanings. Text messages can also be "translated" to standard language on certain web sites as well, although the "translations" are not always universally accepted.

=== Whole word or phrase abbreviation ===
Many people are likely to use these abbreviations in lower case letters. Many of the abbreviations were used previously on the Internet, bulletin boards or minicom.

List of abbreviations
Words in full	Abbreviations or SMS language
Am I Right	AIR or Amirite
As Far As I Know	AFAIK
As Soon As Possible	ASAP
At	@
At The Moment	ATM
...as fuck	AF
Away From Keyboard	AFK
Baby	BB
Babygirl	BBG
Be Back Later	BBL
Be Right Back	BRB
Because	B/C or BCS or BC
Best Friend; Boyfriend	BF
Best Friend Forever; Boyfriend Forever	BFF
Between	B/W
Broken Heart	</3
By The Way	BTW
Bye For Now	BFN
Chicks	CHX
Don't worry	DW
For fuck's sake	FFS
For Real	FR
For The Win	FTW
For Your Information	FYI
Fuck You Mean	FYM
Get The Fuck Out	GTFO
Girlfriend	GF
Good Game	GG (often sarcastic)
Good night/Good morning	GN/GM
Haha	hh
Have A Nice Day	HAND
How I feel when	HIFW
Homegirl	hg
I don't care	IDC
I Don't Know	IDK
I Hate You	IH8U
I have no idea	IHNI
I Know, Right?	IKR
I Love You	ILU or ILY
I Miss You	IMY
I swear to god	ISTG
In Real Life	IRL
If I Remember Correctly	IIRC
In My Humble/Honest Opinion	IMHO
In My Opinion	IMO
Not	!=
Just Kidding	JK
Just so you know	JSYK
Keep It Simple, Stupid	KISS
Later (often as a valediction)	l8r
Laugh(ing) My Ass Off	LMAO
Laugh(ing) Out Loud	LOL
Love	<3
Loving The Weather Today	LTWT or LWT or LW
Message	MSG
Nevermind/No Worries Mate	NVM
No problem	NP
Not a Number	NaN
Oh My Gosh/God/Goodness	OMG
On god	ONG
On my way	OMW
On The Way	OTW
Original Poster, Overpowered	OP
Please	PLZ or PLS
Read the fucking manual	RTFM
Rolling on the Floor Laughing	ROFL or ROTFL
Sealed With a Kiss	SWAK
See You	CU or CYA
See You Later	CUL8R
Shaking My Head (disapproval/frustration)	SMH
Shut The Fuck Up	STFU
Significant Other	SO
So What's Your Problem?	SWYP
Stop What You're Doing	SWYD
Such A Laugh	SAL
Talk To You Later	TTYL
Tears in My Eyes	TIME
Thanks	THNX or THX or TKS
Thanks, Thank you	THNX, THANKU, THANQ, TKS, TY
To Be Announced	TBA
Too Long; Didn't Read	TL;DR, TLDR or TL DR
Too Much Information	TMI
You Only Live Once	YOLO
You're on Your Own	YOYO
What Are You Doing	WYD
What Do You Mean	WDYM
What The Fuck	WTF
What The Hell	WTH
Whatever	Whatevs or W/E or WE
Where Are You At	WYA
Works For Me	WFM

=== A single letter or digit can replace a word, syllable, or phoneme ===
Entire sounds within words would often be replaced by a letter or digit that would produce a similar sound when read by itself:

Word/Syllable/Phoneme	Letter/Digit	Example usage
be	b	Be or not to be becomes b||!=2b
see or sea	c	See you later becomes CU l8r
okay	k^{‡} (or kk^{†})	In example sentence Do you want an ice cream? the k may be used as a smuggish and/or disrespecting response
enjoy or end	n	enjoy becomes njoy and end becomes nd
oh	o	oh my god becomes omg
are	R	In a sentence HRU? meaning How are you? the R becomes are
you	U	In a sentence ?RU doing meaning What are you doing the U becomes you
why	Y	In a sentence Y R U like this? meaning Why are you like this? the Y becomes Why
won or one	1^{§}	anyone becomes any1 or ne1 and no one becomes no1
to, too or two	2^{§}	today becomes 2day and tune becomes 2ne
for or four	4^{§}	forget becomes 4get and afford becomes a4d
ate	8^{§}	great becomes gr8 and hate becomes h8
What? or Huh or Question	?	In a sentence ?4U meaning Questions for you the ? becomes Question
Doubt	X	Originated from L.A. Noire meme
Expresses shock	!	Used as a reaction to a message

^‡ k is sometimes considered passive aggressive
^† kk can also signal the end of a conversation
^§ using numbers phonetically is often intended to be sarcastic
The exclamation mark symbol ! is scalable depending on the amount of shock, the most common use is !!!

Combinations can shorten single or multiple words:

Words	SMS
your	ur
you are	u r
wonderful	1drfl^{§}
before	b4^{§}
easy	ez
someone	sum1^{§}
see you	cu or cya
for you	4u^{§}
tomorrow	2mro^{§}, 2mo^{§}, tmr, or tmrw

== Overall observations and criticisms ==
=== Frequency of use ===
In one American study, researchers found that less than 20% of messages used SMS language. Looking at his own texting history, the study's author, linguist David Crystal, said that just 10% of his messages used SMS language.

=== Positive ===
==== Effect on verbal language use and literacy ====
According to research done by Dr. Nenagh Kemp of the University of Tasmania, the evolution of textese is inherently coupled to a strong grasp of grammar and phonetics.

David Crystal has countered the claims that SMS has a deleterious effect on language with numerous scholarly studies. The findings are summarized in his book Txtng: the Gr8 Db8. In his book, Crystal argues that:

- In a typical text message, words are not abbreviated as frequently as widely thought
- Abbreviating has been in use for a long time, and thus is not a novel phenomenon only found in SMS language. Furthermore, some words such as "sonar" and "laser" that are accepted as standard words in the dictionary are originally acronyms.
- Both children and adults use SMS language, so if adults do not display the errors seen in children's written work, they cannot be attributed to SMS language alone.
- Use of abbreviations in written work and examinations is not particularly prevalent among students.
- A prerequisite to using SMS language is the knowledge of spelling, so use of SMS language does not necessarily imply low literacy.

He further observes that this is by no means a cause for bad spelling, where in fact, texting may lead to an improvement in the literacy of the user.

There are others who feel that the claims of SMS language being detrimental to English language proficiency are overrated. A study of the written work of 100 students by Freudenberg found that the actual amount of use of SMS language found in the written work was not very significant. Some features of SMS language such as the use of emoticons was not observed in any of the written work by the students. Of all the errors found, quite a substantial amount cannot be attributed to use of SMS language. These included errors that appeared before the advent of SMS language.

There are also views that SMS language has little or no effect on grammar. Proponents of this view feel that SMS language is merely another language, and since learning a new language does not affect students' proficiency in English grammar, it cannot be said that SMS language can affect their grammar. With proper instruction, students should be able to distinguish between slang, SMS language and standard English and use them in their appropriate contexts.

==== Efficiency ====
According to a study, though SMS language is faster to write, more time is needed to read it compared to conventional English.

=== Negative ===
==== Effect on verbal language use and communication ====
Although various other research supports the use of SMS language, the popular notion that text messaging is damaging to the linguistic development of young people persists and many view it as a corruption of the standard form of language.

Welsh journalist and television reporter John Humphrys has criticized SMS language as "wrecking our language". The author cites ambiguity as one problem posed, illustrating with examples such as "lol", which may either be interpreted to mean "laughing out loud", "lots of love", and "little old lady" depending on the context in which it is being used. Ambiguous words and statements have always been present within languages. In English for example, the word "duck" can have more than one meaning. It could be referring to either the bird or the action, and such words are usually disambiguated by looking at the context in which it was written.

The proliferation of SMS language has been criticized for causing the deterioration of English language proficiency and its rich heritage. Opponents of SMS language feel that it undermines the properties of the English language that have lasted throughout its long history. Furthermore, words within the SMS language that are very similar to their English-language counterparts can be confused by young users as the actual English spelling and can therefore increase the prevalence of spelling mistakes.

==== Use in schoolwork ====
Use of SMS language in schools tended to be seen as negative. There have been media reports of children using SMS language in school essays. The New Zealand Qualifications Authority denied press reports that they had authorized the use of text abbreviations in exam answers, a spokesperson said "there had been no change to guidelines and there was no specific policy about text language."

A study performed by Cingel and Sundar (2012) investigated the relationship between the use of SMS language and grammar in adolescents. By using a self-report survey where the 228 middle school participants would answer questions regarding their texting behaviors, as well as a ten minute in-class grammar assessment, the study gathered information on how the amount of time a student spent online affected their writing. Cingel and Sundar hypothesized that the more text messages a student received and sent, the more grammar 'adaptations' their writing would contain. The results reflected a negative relationship between text messaging and adolescent grammar skills. They concluded that the more time youth spend on technology, the more they become acquainted with "techspeak" or "textese," and thus allow their approach to grammar and academic writing to change.

== SMS language and identity ==
According to Sean Ó Cadhain, abbreviations and acronyms elicits a sense of group identity as users must be familiar with the lingo of their group to be able to comprehend the SMS language used within the group. The ability to use and understand these language short forms that are unique to each group indicates that an individual is part of the group, forging a group identity that excludes outsiders. SMS language is thus thought to be the "secret code of the youth" by some. The fact that sometimes, shortened forms are used for reasons other than space constraints can be seen as interlocutors trying to establish solidarity with each other.

=== Differences between male and female use of SMS language ===
According to Norwegian researcher Richard Ling, there are differences in the SMS language of females and males. The lexical, morphological and syntactic choices of male and female SMS users suggested to Ling that women are more "adroit" (Note: Use of "adroit" in the adjectival sense as opposed to psychological term. "[Women's] messages are longer, have a more complex structure and retain more of the traditional conventions associated with other written forms than men... This competence is also extended to telephonic communication... The material here seems to suggest that women are also more adroit "texters".) and more "literary" texters. Richard Ling observes:

- Women's messages tend to be "longer"
- Women used more "complex structure" and grammar
- Men's messages tend to comprise "one-sentence", "one-clause" or "one-thought" constructions (the latter is markedly observable among male users within the ages 16 to 19)
- More greetings and words of parting were observed in women's messages
- Women had messages with emotional and practical (e.g., arranging a meeting) content unlike men, who mostly used SMS language for practical content only.
- Women and the younger users (across gender) tend to use more shortened forms and emoticons than men.
- While women observed conventional rules more than men, the difference is marginal. This involves the use of correct spelling, punctuation, capitalization, etc.

== Use in advertisements ==
Circa 2005, advertisements have been increasingly influenced by SMS language. The longer the message in the advertisement, the less the impression it will leave. Hence, short messages that are more catchy, cost and space-saving are more commonly used. The visual effect elicited by SMS language also lends a feeling of novelty that helps to make the advertisement more memorable. For example, an advertisement of a book uses the SMS language: EAT RIGHT 4 YOUR TYPE.

Companies focusing on the teen market have the tendency to make use of SMS language in their advertising to capture the attention of their target audience. Since teenagers tend to be the ones using SMS language, they are able to relate to advertisements that use SMS language. Unilever's advertisement for their novel range of deodorant for teenage girls uses the phrase "OMG! Moments." David Lang, president of the team who created the advertisement commented that they desired to bring across the impression that they identify with youth culture and discourse.

Many other companies like McDonald's have also attempted to pursue the teenage market by using SMS language abbreviations in their commercials. McDonald's in Korea has an online video commercial which concludes with: "r u ready?".

== See also ==
- Internet slang
- Cyberculture
- Leetspeak
- LOL
- Sexting
- Newspeak (Fictional "impoverished" language featured in George Orwell's Nineteen Eighty-Four)
- Cupertino effect (Erroneous replacement of words by spellcheckers)
- Jejemon
- English language spelling reform
- Tironian notes, scribal abbreviations and ligatures (Roman and medieval abbreviations used to save space in manuscripts and epigraphs)
