= The Show Must Go Online =

- Also known as: TSMGO
- Genre: Comedy, Tragedy, History
- Created by: Robert Myles
- Written by: William Shakespeare, Christopher Marlowe, Ian Doescher, John Lyly, George Wilkins, John Fletcher
- Country of origin: United Kingdom
- Original language: English
- No. of seasons: 6
- No. of episodes: 42

Production
- Producer: Sarah Peachey
- Camera setup: Zoom

Original release
- Network: YouTube
- Release: 19 March – 18 November 2020

The Show Must Go Online is a British web series created by Robert Myles. The first episode premiered on 19 March 2020 on YouTube, in direct response to the effects of the COVID-19 pandemic on the theatre industry. The first series consisted of an online, weekly reading of a different First Folio play by William Shakespeare, in the order they were believed to have been written.

The Show Must Go Online has utilised actors from all over the world, including Jeffrey Weissman, Ben Crystal, Mark Holden, Elizabeth Dennehy, Wendy Morgan, Seeta Indrani and Miguel Perez. The series received two OnComm Awards and an ONEOFF award. Its First Folio season ran until 18 November 2020 with subsequent shows performed bimonthly. The series concluded with The Two Noble Kinsmen in September 2021.

== Background ==
=== Original First Folio series ===
March 2020 saw the UK enter into a nationwide lockdown in response to the coronavirus pandemic. British theatre closures were announced on 16 March. Robert Myles, an actor and Shakespeare aficionado who found himself out of work, created The Show Must Go Online in less than a week, in response to the widespread cancellation of jobs and contracts faced by theatrical industry professionals. Inspiration was also taken from the fact that William Shakespeare wrote many of his poems and plays when theatres were shut as a result of the plague. King Lear was one such play written during that time.

With actors and creatives in a state of lockdown when the series began, Zoom was used for both the rehearsals and the performance. The show was then live streamed through YouTube.

The cast included notable professionals and also a number of amateur actors. Notable actors who were cast in the series, included British television actors such as Wendy Morgan and Seeta Indrani. Michael Bertenshaw, an actor with the Royal Shakespeare Company, was also in several episodes. Ben Crystal, an actor noted for both his performances in Shakespeare's plays, and also his series of books on Shakespeare, played the titular role in Timon of Athens performing latter sections of the play in original pronunciation. The series also featured many American screen actors, including Jeffrey Weissman, Elizabeth Dennehy and Miguel Perez. As a whole, actors used in the series came from 6 of the 7 continents of the world. Each show in the series had an introduction by different guest speakers. Ben Crystal and Simon Russell Beale both introduced live performances for The Show Must Go Online.

The original series of Shakespeare plays ran until 18 November 2020. The series followed the First Folio, and as such, neither Pericles or The Two Noble Kinsmen were included in the run.

=== Subsequent work ===
Following the conclusion of the original First Folio series, The Show Must Go Online announced a livestreamed production of William Shakespeare’s A Christmas Carol, by Ian Doescher on 19 December 2020. Moving away from the free-to-watch format of the original series, this show marked the beginning of a shift to ticketed performances. Wendy Morgan returned to the series to play the lead role of Ebenezer Scrooge.

This was followed by performances of Shakespeare and George Wilkins' Pericles, and John Lyly's Gallathea in 2021, with the latter production consisting of an international majority LGBTQIA+ cast. There was also a series of performances of work by Christopher Marlowe throughout the summer. The series concluded with a performance of The Two Noble Kinsmen on 8 September 2021, before The Show Must Go Online entered a 'chrysalis' period.

== Reception ==
The series was the recipient of two OnComm Awards, while the series was in progress. When The Show Must Go Online reached its conclusion, it was awarded a "ONEOFF" award by The Offies, in recognition of the achievements of the series during the lockdown. The Show Must Go Online was also nominated for "Digital Project of the Year" in The Stage Awards of 2022, but ultimately lost out to the Royal National Theatre's production of Romeo & Juliet.

The critical response was positive, and during the COVID-19 pandemic lockdown, it was praised as being the only way of experiencing 'genuinely live theatre'. In a March 2020 article for MyTheatreMates and Mind the Blog, Debbie Gilpin described the first production of The Show Must Go Online as a 'roaring success'. Reviews continued to be positive as the series progressed, with praise being given to the diversity of the casting and the success with how the plays have translated live on YouTube.

Writing for the Folger Shakespeare Library, Austin Tichenor wrote in September 2020 that The Show Must Go Online was particularly popular with people who are excluded from the traditional theatre-going experience because of health conditions. He also praised the fact that the performances remain permanently on YouTube, 'as a resource for future students and Shakespeare newcomers alike'.
