= Txtng: the Gr8 Db8 =

Book by David Crystal

Txtng: The Gr8 Db8 is a 2008 book about text messaging, by linguist David Crystal.

The title is a logogram which stands for Texting: The Great Debate. In his book, Crystal examines the use of text messaging and its effect on language and literacy. Based on research and experimental results, he disagrees with the popular view that the use of abbreviations and slang, such as those in SMS language, will lead to low literacy and bad spelling among children.

== Main points ==
Crystal put forward the following points in his book:

- Typically, less than 10% of the words are abbreviated in text messages.
- Abbreviating is not a new language; instead, it has been present for many decades.
- Children and adults both use SMS language, the latter being more likely to do so.
- Students do not habitually use abbreviations in their homework or examinations.
- Sending text messages is not a cause of bad spelling because people need to know how to spell before they can send a text message.
- Sending text messages improves people's literacy, as it provides more opportunity for people to engage with their language through reading and writing. The last point seems to be especially useful for school-age children.
