= David Crystal =

British linguist and writer (born 1941)

David Crystal OBE FBA FLSW FCIL
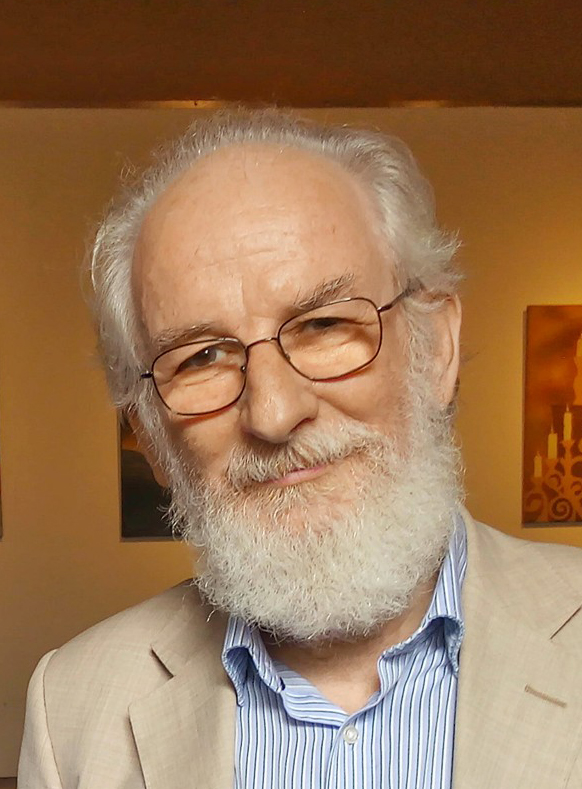
- Crystal in 2017
- Born: 6 July 1941 (age 85); Lisburn, Northern Ireland
- Education: University College London
- Spouse: Hilary Crystal
- Children: Ben Crystal
- Scientific career
- Fields: Linguistics
- Website: davidcrystal.com

David Crystal (born 6 July 1941) is a British linguist who studies the English language.

Crystal studied English at University College London and has lectured at Bangor University and the University of Reading. He was awarded an OBE in 1995 and a Fellowship of the British Academy in 2000. Crystal was awarded an Honorary Doctorate by Lancaster University in 2013. Crystal is a proponent of Internet linguistics and has also been involved in Shakespeare productions, providing guidance on original pronunciation.

== Family ==
Crystal was born in Lisburn, Northern Ireland, on 6 July 1941 after his mother had been evacuated there during The Blitz. Before he reached the age of one, his parents separated. He remained estranged from and ignorant of his father for most of his childhood, but later learnt (through work contacts and a half-brother) of the life and career of Samuel Crystal in London, and of his half-Jewish heritage. He grew up with his mother in Holyhead, North Wales, and Liverpool, England, where he attended St Mary's College from 1951. Crystal is a practising Roman Catholic.

He currently lives in Holyhead with his wife, Hilary, a former speech therapist and now children's author. He has four grown-up children. His son Ben Crystal is also an author, and has co-authored four books with his father.

== Career ==
Crystal studied English at University College London between 1959 and 1962, and was a researcher under Randolph Quirk between 1962 and 1963, working on the Survey of English Usage. Since then he has lectured at Bangor University and the University of Reading and is an honorary professor of linguistics at Bangor. Retired from full-time academia, he works as a writer, editor and consultant, and contributes to television and radio broadcasts. His association with the BBC ranges from, formerly, a BBC Radio 4 series on language issues to, more recently, podcasts on the BBC World Service website for people learning English.

Crystal was appointed OBE in 1995 and became a Fellow of the British Academy in 2000. He is also a Founding Fellow of the Learned Society of Wales and is a Fellow of the Chartered Institute of Linguists. His many academic interests include English language learning and teaching, clinical linguistics, forensic linguistics, language death, "ludic linguistics" (Crystal's neologism for the study of language play), style, English genre, Shakespeare, indexing, and lexicography. He is the Patron of the International Association of Teachers of English as a Foreign Language (IATEFL), honorary president of the Chartered Institute of Editing and Proofreading (CIEP), and Patron of the UK National Literacy Association. He is a consultant for Babel – The Language Magazine, for which he has also written articles.

== Work ==
Crystal has authored, co-authored, and edited more than 120 books on a wide variety of subjects, specialising among other things in editing reference works, including (as author) the Cambridge Encyclopedia of Language (1987, 1997, 2010) and the Cambridge Encyclopedia of the English Language (1995, 2003, 2019), and (as editor) the Cambridge Biographical Dictionary, the Cambridge Factfinder, the Cambridge Encyclopedia, and the New Penguin Encyclopedia (2003).

Crystal has also written plays and poetry. He has published several books for the general reader about linguistics and the English language, which use varied graphics and short essays to communicate technical material in an accessible manner. In his article "What is Standard English", Crystal hypothesises that, globally, English will both split and converge, with local variants becoming less mutually comprehensible and therefore necessitating the rise of what he terms World Standard Spoken English (see also International English).

In his 2004 book The Stories of English, a general history of the English language, he describes the value he sees in linguistic diversity and the according of respect to varieties of English generally considered "non-standard". In 2009 Routledge published his autobiographical memoir Just a Phrase I'm Going Through: My Life in Language, which was released simultaneously with a DVD of three of his lectures. His book Spell It Out: The Curious, Enthralling and Extraordinary Story of English Spelling (2013) explains why some English words are difficult to spell. His companion book, Making a Point: The Pernickety Story of English Punctuation came out in 2015 from Profile Books (UK) and St. Martin's Press (US).

Crystal is a proponent of a new field of study, Internet linguistics, and has published Language and the Internet (2001) on the subject. Crystal's book Txtng: The Gr8 Db8 (2008) focused on text language and its impact on society. He was one of the book series editors of The Language Library.

From 2001 to 2006, Crystal served as the Chairman of Crystal Reference Systems Limited, a provider of reference content and Internet search and advertising technology. The company's iSense and Sitescreen products are based upon the patented Global Data Model, a complex semantic network that Crystal devised in the early 1980s and was adapted for use on the Internet in the mid 1990s. These include semantic targeting technology (marketed as iSense by ad pepper media) and brand protection technology (marketed as SiteScreen by Emediate ApS). The iSense technology is the subject of patents in the United Kingdom and the United States. After the company's acquisition by Ad Pepper Media N.V., he remained on the board as its R&D director until 2009.

Crystal was influential in a campaign to save Holyhead's convent from demolition, leading to the creation of the Ucheldre Centre.

== Involvement in Shakespeare productions ==
As an expert on the evolution of the English language, he was involved in the production of Shakespeare at Shakespeare's Globe in 2004 and 2005 in the "Original Pronunciation" of the period in which he was writing, coaching the actors on the appropriate pronunciation for the period, and has since been the consultant for several other Shakespeare plays performed in OP, including A Midsummer Night's Dream, Hamlet, Macbeth, Pericles, The Merchant of Venice, and Henry V.

== Bibliography ==
=== Books ===
- Crystal, David and Quirk, Randolph (1964). Systems of Prosodic and Paralinguistic Features in English. The Hague: Mouton.
- Crystal, David (1965). Linguistics, Language and Religion. London: Burns & Oates.
- Crystal, David (1968). What is Linguistics?. London: Edward Arnold.
- Crystal, David and Davy, Derek (1969). Investigating English Style. London: Longman.
- Crystal, David and Boulton, W.F. (eds.) (1969). The English Language: Essays by Linguists and Men of Letters, Vol. 2 1858-1964. Cambridge: Cambridge University Press.
- Crystal, David (1969). Prosodic Systems and Intonation in English. Cambridge: Cambridge University Press.
- Crystal, David (1971). Linguistics. Harmondsworth: Penguin.
- Crystal, David and Davy, Derek (1975). Advanced Conversational English. London: Longman.
- Crystal, David (1975). The English Tone of Voice: Essays in Intonation, Prosody and Paralanguage. London: Edward Arnold.
- Crystal, David, Fletcher, Paul and Garman, Michael (1976). The Grammatical Analysis of Language Disability: A Procedure for Assessment and Remediation. London: Edward Arnold.
- Crystal, David (1976). Child Language, Learning and Linguistics. London: Edward Arnold.
- Crystal, David (1979). Working with LARSP. London: Edward Arnold.
- Crystal, David (ed.) (1980). Eric Partridge in His Own Words. London: Deutsch.
- Crystal, David (1980). Introduction to Language Pathology. London: Edward Arnold.
- Crystal, David (1981). Clinical Linguistics. Vienna & New York: Springer.
- Crystal, David (1981). Directions in Applied Linguistics. Academic Press.
- Crystal, David (ed.) (1982). Linguistic Controversies. London: Edward Arnold.
- Crystal, David (1982). Profiling Linguistic Disability. London: Edward Arnold.
- Crystal, David (1984). Who Cares About English Usage?. Harmondsworth: Penguin.
- Crystal, David (1984). Linguistic Encounters with Language Handicap. Oxford: Blackwell.
- Crystal, David (1986). Listen to Your Child: A Parent's Guide to Children's Language. Harmondsworth: Penguin.
- Crystal, David (1988). The English Language. Harmondsworth: Penguin.
- Crystal, David (1991). Making Sense of English Usage. Edinburgh: Chambers
- Crystal, David (1991). Language A to Z with David Crystal: Key Stage 3: Pupil's Book 1. London: Longman.
- Crystal, David (1991). Language A to Z with David Crystal: Key Stage 4: Pupil's Book 2. London: Longman.
- Crystal, David (1991). Language A to Z with David Crystal: Teacher's Book for Stages 3 and 4. London: Longman.
- Crystal, David (1992). Introducing Linguistics. Harmondsworth: Penguin.
- Crystal, David (ed.) (1992). Nineties Knowledge. Edinburgh: Chambers.
- Crystal, David (1997). English as a Global Language. Cambridge: Cambridge University Press.
- Crystal, David (1998). Language Play. Harmondsworth: Penguin.
- Crystal, David and Crystal, Hilary (2000). Words On Words: Quotations About Language and Languages. Harmondsworth: Penguin.
- Crystal, David (2000). Language Death. Cambridge University Press.
- Crystal, David (2001). Language and the Internet. Cambridge University Press.
- Crystal, David (2004). The Language Revolution. Cambridge: Polity Press
- Crystal, David (2004). The Stories of English. London: Penguin / New York: Overlook Press.
- Crystal, David and Crystal, Ben (2005). The Shakespeare Miscellany. London: Penguin.
- Crystal, David (2005). Pronouncing Shakespeare: The Globe Experiment. Cambridge: Cambridge University Press.
- Crystal, David (2006). Words Words Words. Oxford: Oxford University Press.
- Crystal, David (2006). By Hook or by Crook; A Journey in Search of English. London: HarperCollins. (Published in the US in 2009 as Walking English: A Journey in Search of Language)
- Crystal, David (2006). As They Say in Zanzibar: Proverbial Wisdom from Around the World. London: HarperCollins.
- Crystal, David (2006). The Fight for English. Oxford: Oxford University Press.
- Crystal, David (2006). How Language Works: How Babies Babble, Words Change Meaning, and Languages Live or Die. London: Penguin.
- Crystal, David (2008). Txtng: The Gr8 Db8. Oxford: Oxford University Press.
- Crystal, David (2008). Think on my Words: Exploring Shakespeare's Language. Cambridge: Cambridge University Press.
- Crystal, David (2009). Just a Phrase I'm Going Through: My Life in Language. London and New York: Routledge.
- Crystal, David (2009). John Bradburne on Love. Holyhead: Holy Island Press
- Crystal, David (2010). A Little Book of Language. New Haven and London: Yale University Press.
- Crystal, David (2010). Begat: The King James Bible and the English Language. Oxford: Oxford University Press.
- Facchinetti, Roberta, Crystal, Crystal and Seidlhofer, Barbara (eds.) (2010). From International to Local English – And Back Again. Bern: Peter Lang.
- Crystal, David (2010). Evolving English: One Language, Many Voices. An Illustrated History of the English Language. London: British Library.
- Crystal, David (2011). Internet Linguistics: A Student Guide. London: Routledge.
- Ball, Martin J, Crystal, David and Fletcher, Paul (eds.) (2011). Assessing Grammar: The Languages of LARSP. Bristol: Multilingual Matters.
- Crystal, David (2011). The Story of English in 100 Words. London: Profile Books.
- Crystal, David (2012). Spell It Out: The Singular Story of English Spelling. London: Profile Books.
- Crystal, David and Crystal, Hilary (2013). Wordsmiths and Warriors: The English-Language Tourist's Guide to Britain. Oxford: Oxford University Press.
- Crystal, David (2014). Words in Time and Place: Exploring Language Through the Historical Thesaurus of the Oxford English Dictionary. Oxford: Oxford University Press.
- Crystal, David and Crystal, Ben (2014). You Say Potato: A Book About Accents. London: Macmillan.
- Crystal, David (2015). The Disappearing Dictionary: A Treasury of Lost English Dialect Words. London: Macmillan.
- Crystal, David (2015). Making a Point: The Pernickety Story of English Punctuation. London: Profile Books.
- Ball, Martin J, Crystal, David and Fletcher, Paul (eds.) (2016). Profiling Grammar: More Languages of LARSP. Bristol: Multilingual Matters.
- Crystal, David (2016). The Unbelievable Hamlet Discovery. Holyhead: Crystal Books.
- Crystal, David (2016). The Gift of the Gab: How Eloquence Works. New Haven and London: Yale University Press.
- Crystal, David (2017). Making Sense: The Glamorous Story of English Grammar. London: Profile Books.
- Crystal, David (2017). The Story of Be: A Verb's-Eye View of the English Language. Oxford: Oxford University Press.
- Crystal, David (2017). A Life Made of Words: the Poetry and Thought of John Bradburne. Holyhead: Crystal Books.
- Crystal, David (2017). We Are Not Amused: Victorian Views on Pronunciation as Told in the Pages of Punch. Oxford: Bodleian Library Publishing.
- Crystal, David (2018). Sounds Appealing: The Passionate Story of English Pronunciation. London: Profile Books.
- Ball, Martin J, Fletcher, Paul and Crystal, David, eds. (2019). Grammatical Profiles: Further Languages of LARSP. Bristol: Multilingual Matters.
- Crystal, David (2020). Let's Talk: How English Conversation Works. Oxford: Oxford University Press.
- Crystal, David (2020). That’s the Ticket for Soup!: Victorian Views on Vocabulary as Told in the Pages of Punch. Oxford: Bodleian Library.
- Crystal, David (2021). Tales of the Linguistically Unexpected. Holyhead: Crystal Books [self-published].
- Crystal, Ben and Crystal, David (compilers) (2023). Everyday Shakespeare: Lines for Life. London: Chambers.
- Crystal, David (2023). A Date with Language. Oxford: Bodleian Library.

=== Reference works ===
- Crystal, David (1980). A First Dictionary of Linguistics and Phonetics. London: Deutsch (Subsequent editions published by Blackwells as A Dictionary of Linguistics and Phonetics)
- Crystal, David (1987). The Cambridge Encyclopedia of Language. Cambridge: Cambridge University Press.
- Crystal, David (1988). Rediscover Grammar. London: Longman.
- Crystal, David (ed.) (1992). The Cambridge Concise Encyclopedia. Cambridge: Cambridge University Press.
- Crystal, David (1992). An Encyclopedic Dictionary of Language and Languages. Oxford: Blackwell. (Subsequently, published by Penguin, with the 2nd ed. titled The Penguin Dictionary of Language)
- Crystal, David (ed.) (1993). The Cambridge Paperback Encyclopedia. Cambridge: Cambridge University Press.
- Crystal, David (ed.) (1993). The Cambridge Factfinder. Cambridge: Cambridge University Press.
- Crystal, David (ed.) (1994). The Cambridge Biographical Encyclopedia. Cambridge: Cambridge University Press.
- Crystal, David (1995). The Cambridge Encyclopedia of the English Language. Cambridge: Cambridge University Press. ISBN 9780521401791.
- Crystal, David (1996). Discover Grammar. London: Longman.
- Crystal, David (1996). The Cambridge Biographical Dictionary. Cambridge: Cambridge University Press.
- Crystal, David (ed.) (2002). The New Penguin Encyclopedia. London: Penguin.
- Crystal, David and Crystal, Ben (2002). Shakespeare's Words: A Glossary and Language Companion. London: Penguin.
- Crystal, David (ed.) (2003). The Penguin Concise Encyclopedia. London: Penguin.
- Crystal, David (ed.) (2003). The New Penguin Factfinder. London: Penguin.
- Crystal, David (2004). Making Sense of Grammar. London: Pearson Longman.
- Crystal, David (2004). A Glossary of Netspeak and Textspeak. Edinburgh: Edinburgh University Press
- Crystal, David (2004). The Penguin Book of Facts. London: Penguin.
- David Crystal, ed. (2004). The Penguin Encyclopedia (2nd ed.). Penguin Books. ISBN 0-140-51543-7 – via Internet Archive.
- Crystal, David (2005). Penguin Pocket Spelling Dictionary. London: Penguin Reference.
- Crystal, David (2005). Dr Johnson's Dictionary: an Anthology. London: Penguin Classics.
- Crystal, David (ed.) (2005). The Penguin Concise Encyclopedia. London: Penguin Reference.
- Crystal, David (ed.) (2005). Pocket Quotations. London: Penguin Reference.
- Crystal, David (ed.) (2005). Pocket Facts. London: Penguin Reference.
- Crystal, David (ed.) (2006). Penguin Pocket On This Day. London: Penguin Reference.
- Crystal, David (ed.) (2006). Penguin Pocket Kings and Queens. London: Penguin Reference.
- Crystal, David (ed.) (2006). Penguin Pocket Famous People. London: Penguin Reference.
- Fowler, H.W., Crystal, David (ed.) (2009). Fowler's Dictionary of Modern English Usage. Oxford: Oxford University Press. (Reprint of 1926 1st ed.)
- Crystal, David and Crystal, Ben (2015). Oxford Illustrated Shakespeare Dictionary. Oxford: Oxford University Press.
- Crystal, David (2016). The Oxford Dictionary of Original Shakespearean Pronunciation. Oxford: Oxford University Press.

=== Critical studies and reviews ===
- Morrisby, Edwin (October 1995). "A gallimaufry of Englishes". Books. Quadrant. 39 (10): 84–86. Review of The Cambridge encyclopedia of the English language.
