= Shakespeare in Original Pronunciation =

Style of Shakespeare performance

Shakespeare in Original Pronunciation, or simply Original Pronunciation (OP), is a movement dedicated to the examination and subsequent performance of Shakespeare's works in a loose reconstruction of Shakespeare's own Early Modern English phonology (accent), as devised by linguist David Crystal. While scholars disagree on many specifics of Shakespeare's own accent, Crystal's Original Pronunciation is more adapted to theatrical performance onstage and the expectations of a modern audience.

== History of the movement ==
=== Background ===
Shakespeare lived during a time of great linguistic change for the English language. Early Modern English, the English of Shakespeare's day, was undergoing the Great Vowel Shift, which changed the pronunciation of all of English's long vowels as well as several other sounds. Many words of Early Modern English were pronounced differently from today's standard pronunciations in both modern British and American English.

The second half of the 19th century brought about "the first systematic reconstructions of Shakespearean phonology". In the 20th century, eminent English phoneticians such as Daniel Jones and A. C. Gimson provided such reconstructions in the form of phonetic transcriptions, and debates ensued about many of the details.

In 2004, David Crystal coined the term "Original Pronunciation" to describe his own reconstruction to be used for a production of Romeo and Juliet at Shakespeare's Globe that year. This motivated his further publications of OP transcriptions and the expansion of his OP project within the following decade. The beginning of the Globe's foray into Original Pronunciation showed that older actors initially had more difficulty in embracing it.

=== Motivations ===
In 2012, David Crystal stated that he wished to promote performances of "Shakespeare as hopefully he would have heard it.... It sounds raw and from the heart, which is very different from the way I think Shakespeare has been performed for the last half century or so".

Crystal largely aims to emphasise wordplay, puns, and rhymes that he believes have been lost to the modern ear and to create an accent that does not sound like any one region of the British Isles, while remaining comprehensible to modern listeners.

Ben Crystal, a Shakespearean actor and David Crystal's son, describes the way Shakespeare in Original Pronunciation affects his body and vocal register:

It drops your center.... With OP, it comes down towards your stomach and your groin. It changes the way you move. I go from speaking in a very, in a much sort of higher quality of my voice, and I get down more into the gravelly part of my resonance. It has tremendous ramifications, from male to female, old to young, anybody that I've seen use OP, the effect's the same.

The actor Colin Hurley found that the joy of OP is that it relocates the emotion of the text from the head to somewhere 'between the legs', and that the eradication of RP makes the whole experience relatively 'classless'.

Giles Block, the Master of Play for the Globe's 2005 production of Troilus and Cressida in OP, said that the play became 'emotionally richer' and 'less of a museum piece'.

David Crystal has found that audience members often connect to OP performances by finding familiar elements of their own regional speech in OP.

=== History of productions ===
In 2004, Shakespeare's Globe in London produced three performances of Romeo and Juliet in Original Pronunciation. Spearheaded by linguist David Crystal and play director, Tim Carroll, this was the beginning of contemporary interest in Shakespeare in original pronunciation. Crystal describes the rehearsal and production process in the book Pronouncing Shakespeare (CUP 2005).

In 2005, the Globe went on to produce six performances of Troilus and Cressida in original pronunciation. Since then, there have been many further productions of Shakespeare in original pronunciation, including A Midsummer Night's Dream in 2010 by the University of Kansas and Twelfth Night in 2012 by the American Theatre of Actors.

In April 2013, Bangor University's ROSTRA performed As You Like It in original pronunciation under the supervision of David Crystal.

Ben Crystal played the title in Hamlet in OP, for the University of Reno, Nevada, in 2011. He curated the British Library's CD Shakespeare's Original Pronunciation (2011), and directed staged readings of Macbeth (2014) and Henry V (2015) at the Wanamaker Playhouse, Shakespeare's Globe.

In 2015, Ben Crystal produced Pericles: Recomposed for Daniel Harding’s Interplay Festival at the Swedish Radio Symphony Orchestra’s Berwaldhallen in Stockholm, and revived the production for the 2016 Savannah Music Festival. Pericles: Recomposed was spoken in OP, raised in 3 days, underscored by Max Richter’s Four Seasons: Recomposed, and played live by the violinist Daniel Hope, with the Trondheim Soloists in Sweden, and L’Arte Del Monde in Savannah.

Ben Crystal produced an adaptation of A Midsummer Night's Dream called 'The Dreame Project' for The Shakespeare Ensemble in 2018, and toured Japan in 2019 with Macbeth, Romeo and Juliet, and Hamlet in OP.

== Pronunciation examples ==
Shakespeare scholars agree that his accent would have been rhotic, pronouncing all "r" sounds, like modern American or Irish accents. Crystal's OP adheres to this, a feature that has been lost in most 21st-century British accents.

=== Puns ===
An example of a Shakespearean pun Crystal identifies as no longer working in Modern English comes from the prologue of Romeo and Juliet, Act 1, lines 5-6:

From forth the fatal loins of these two foes
A pair of star-crossed lovers take their life

In Modern English, the word "lines" does not carry the possible double meaning of the Early Modern English, in which some dialects pronounced lines and loins the same, as something like [ləɪnz]. Thus, Modern English audiences miss the pun.

Another example is the pronunciation of "hour", as in As You Like It:

And so from hour to hour we ripe and ripe.
And then from hour to hour we rot and rot.
And thereby hangs a tale.

In Early Modern English, "hour" could potentially be pronounced [oːɹ], homophonous to "whore"; H-dropping was regularly observed. The change in pronunciation of both words in Modern English means that a sexual joke is possibly missed by a modern audience.

=== Rhymes ===
An example of a Shakespearean rhyme that no longer works in Modern English comes from A Midsummer Night's Dream, Act 3, Scene II, lines 104-106:

Flower of this purple dye,
Hit with Cupid's archery,
Sink in apple of his eye.

In Modern English pronunciation, the rhyme does not work in all lines, but in Original Pronunciation, all three lines rhyme, ending with [-əɪ].

== Criticism ==
Theatre professor Laura Lodewyck, on the audience-focused goals of OP, expresses that "there are limits to the OP enterprise. Some texts, for instance, may be better suited to OP performance than others". By way of example, she cites comedic or rustically-set Shakespeare plays, which may carry less audience expectation around fixed or high-brow linguistic styles. She also notes that, as a leading expert in English linguistics, Crystal has reasons to be biased toward promoting these theatrical productions.

Others have outlined reasons why Shakespeare's accent can never be perfectly reconstructed. Studies on Shakespearean pronunciation predating Crystal have warned that Early Modern English would be somewhat unintelligible to modern listeners, and reconstructions biased by factors such as modern staging intentions or closeness to modern accents are likely to be fairly inaccurate or not fully evidence-based. Controversy even persists over whether Shakespeare himself intended the various puns and wordplay allegedly identified by modern OP scholars.

Shakespeare professor Ema Vyroubalová expresses concerns over Crystal's version of Elizabethan pronunciation becoming viewed as a monolith. Referring to his 2016 OP dictionary, she comments:

Despite David Crystal’s caution that, just as there is no single “standard” pronunciation of English today, there is no single OP; the very form of the dictionary, with its presentation of one OP pronunciation together with its modern equivalent for every word, tends to reify the idea of a single OP.

Since Elizabethan English is known to have encompassed many "wide-ranging accents", she instead advocates for "recreating a spectrum" of period-appropriate pronunciations for the stage, which could more authentically incorporate the regional, ethnic, and other variations of the time.

This is in fact what Crystal does, as each OP production has had a cast of actors with different ethnic or regional backgrounds, and they all used their own accents along with the Early Modern English sound system (phonology). The Oxford Dictionary of Original Shakespearean Pronunciation transcriptions are also phonemic, not phonetic, which allows for a degree of accent variation.

== Audience reactions ==
In a New Yorker review of the 2005 production of Troilus and Cressida, critic John Lahr states:

"Soaring Shakespearean lines, such as 'Her hand / In whose comparison all whites are ink,' evaporate like a cough in the theatre... the waves of words produce a mesmerizing static, sort of like listening to poetry underwater."

Paul Meier, dialect coach and director, states:

“Having coached and/or directed several Shakespeare productions in the Original Pronunciation, I can allay the fears of any company contemplating an OP project but nervous about audiences’ reactions.

Audiences love it! Perhaps they attended in some trepidation, but at talk-backs, report to me how delighted they are to discover the vernacular, down-to-earthness of the dialect, and the swift modern feel of an OP performance done right.

And when I point out that Shakespeare’s OP is far more accessible than many dialects of today, they realize how groundless their trepidation was. They especially appreciate how OP magically restores lost rhymes and wordplay that no longer works in today’s English.”
