= The Stories of English =

- Author: David Crystal
- Language: English
- Genre: English studies
- Publisher: Overlook TP (UK)
- Publication date: 2004
- Publication place: United Kingdom
- Media type: Print (Hardback & Paperback)
- ISBN: 978-1-58567-719-1
- OCLC: 61691094
- Dewey Decimal: 427 22
- LC Class: PE1074.7 .C79 2005

The Stories of English is a 2004 book by British linguist David Crystal; it traces the history of the English language from the invasion of Great Britain by the Angles and Saxons in the 5th Century to the modern splintering of the language into its modern British, American, Indian, Australian, and other dialects.

One primary focus of the book is a history of British English, from its Old English beginnings to Middle English, Early Modern English, and Modern English. Crystal also argues eloquently for the inclusion of dialects and "non-standard" varieties of English. Even for the Old English period, he shows how the available evidence can be used to determine what dialectal variation existed.

Finally, Crystal condemns what he sees as the over-abundance of linguistic prescription in the study of English, especially that which existed from the 18th Century to the 20th. He speaks approvingly of the recent shift of focus in English language education away from prescriptivism.
