= Wendy Morgan (actress) =

British actress

Wendy Morgan (born 1958) is an English actress. She won the award of "Best Newcomer — Actress" at the Evening Standard British Film Awards in 1980.

== Theatre appearances ==
Morgan appeared at the National Theatre as Tamar in Peter Shaffer's Yonadab and in the title role in Martine by Jean-Jacques Bernard, for which she received Olivier and Evening Standard Award nominations. Other NT productions featuring Morgan have included A Streetcar Named Desire, Bacchai, Carrington, You Can't Take It With You, As I Lay Dying, The Pied Piper, Coriolanus, and Animal Farm.

Morgan's other work in theatre includes: The Invisible Woman/Like Mother, Marilyn and Ella, Pack Up Your Troubles, The Winslow Boy, The Merchant of Venice, A Christmas Carol, My Mother Said I Never Should, Road to Nirvana, Romeo and Juliet, The Woman Who Cooked Her Husband, Oh, What a Lovely War!, Othello, As You Like It, Stars in the Morning, The Passing Out Parade and Crimes of the Heart. In London's West End she appeared in Piaf.

Morgan appeared again at the Royal National Theatre in Phèdre as Panope in 2009 and in Henry IV, Part 1 and Part 2 at the Theatre Royal, Bath as Lady Mortimer/Doll Tearsheet in 2011.

Morgan also played Puck in Jenny Hall's Zoom production of A Midsummer Night's Dream on 31 March 2021.

== Television appearances ==
- 1978: Play for Today: Soldiers Talking Cleanly, as Brigitta
- 1980: Armchair Thriller: High Tide, as Celia (4 episodes)
- 1981: BBC2 Playhouse: Skylark, as Phyllida
- 1981: Andrina as Andrina
- 1982: Othello, as Bianca
- 1982: Dick Turpin, the Godmother (season four), as Tabitha (1 episode)
- 1983: Pictures, as Ruby Sears (episode 1.1)
- 1984: The Jewel in the Crown, as Susan Layton (11 episodes)
- 1991: The Play on One, as Liz (1 episode)
- 1991: The Ruth Rendell Mysteries: Means of Evil, as Hannah Kingman (2 episodes)
- 1991: Casualty: Allegiance, as Elaine
- 1992: Love Hurts: Crawling from the Wreckage, as Miriam (1 episode)
- 1993: Full Stretch, as Tanya Levick (1 episode)
- 1994: The Fame Factor: The Battersea Bardot, as Carol White
- 1994: The Bill: Hey Diddle Diddle, as Barbara Towner
- 1995: Casualty: Learning Curve, as Tracey Myhill
- 1995: Blood and Water, (an installment of the TV series Ghosts), as Barbara Pritchard
- 1995: Shine on Harvey Moon, as Helen (8 episodes)
- 1995: Class Act, as Sarah (1 episode)
- 2003: M.I.T.: Murder Investigation Team: Models and Millionaires, as Jenny Sutcliffe (1 episode)
- 2003: The Bill: 175
- 2004: Amnesia, as Anne Sellers
- 2004: Fingersmith, as Mrs. Cream
- 2005: The Commander: Blackdog, as Deirdre Warner
- 2007: Casualty: Life’s Too Short, as Carol Goldsmith
- 2007: Midsomer Murders: Death in a Chocolate Box, as Maria Godbold (Lady Holm)
- 2008: Wire in the Blood: Unnatural Vices, Part 1, as Bella Peters (1 episode)
- 2010: Casualty: Loves Me, Loves Me Not, as Denise
- 2013: Truckers, as Roz
- 2020: The Show Must Go Online, as Richard Plantagenet Duke of York, Queen Margaret, Earl of Kent & Ensemble (4 episodes), and Ebenezer Scrooge in Ian Doescher's William Shakespeare's A Christmas Carol

== Film appearances ==
- 1979: Yanks, as Mollie
- 1979: Birth of the Beatles, as Cynthia Lennon
- 1980: High Tide, as Celia
- 1980: The Mirror Crack'd, as Cherry
- 1987: 84 Charing Cross Road, as Megan Wells
- 2017: Edie, as Nancy
