= Museo Universitario Arte Contemporáneo =

Contemporary art museum

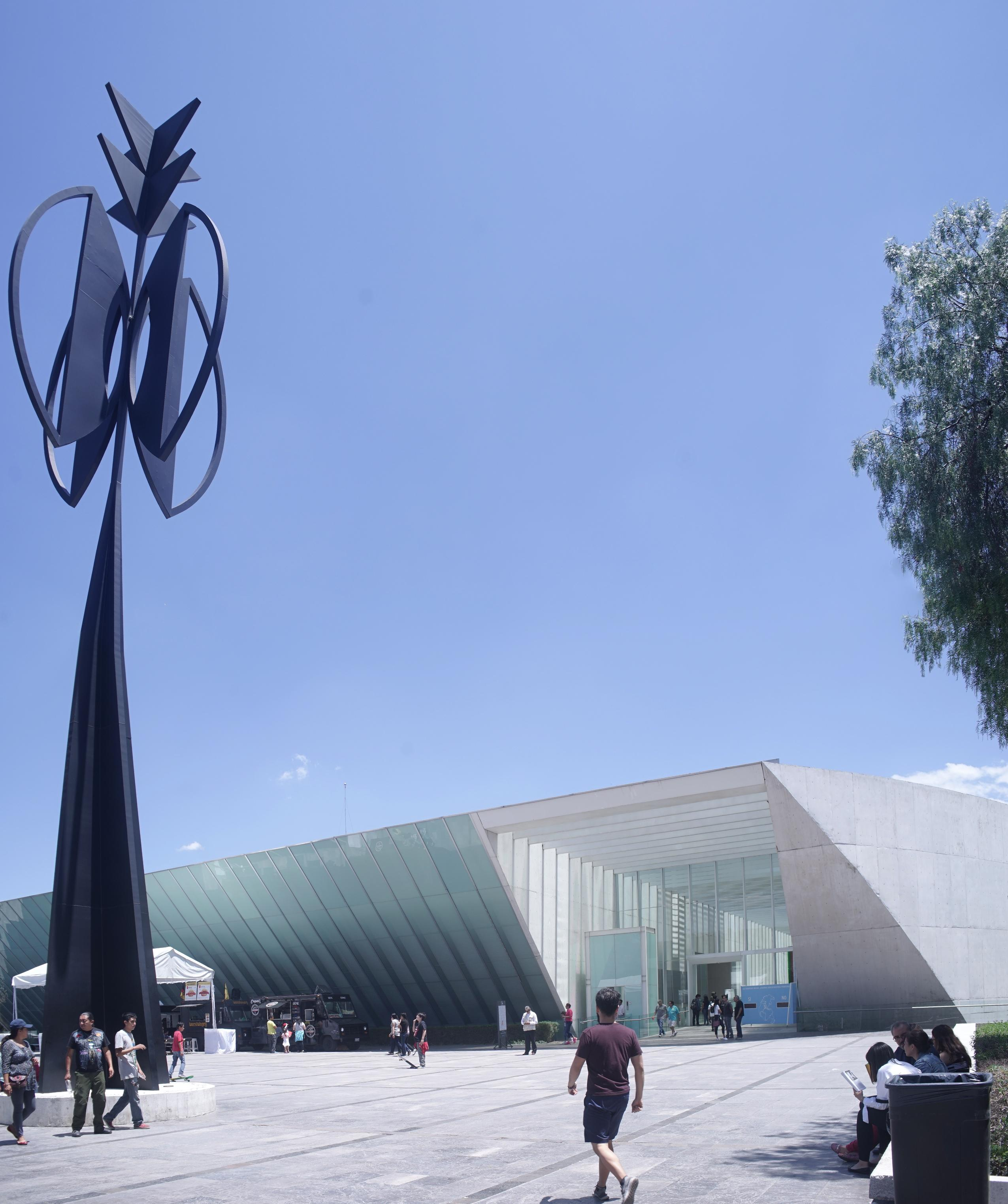

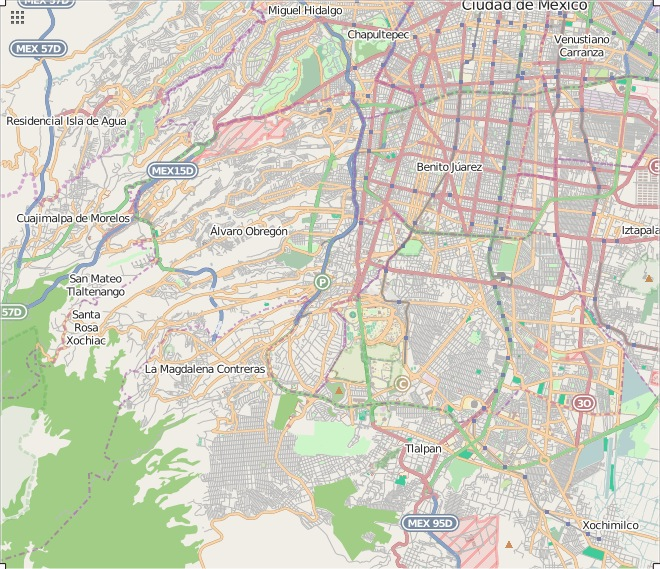
- location in southwestern Mexico City
- Established: November 2008
- Location: Avenida de los Insurgentes Sur 3000, Mexico City
- Coordinates: 19.314391°N 99.18538°W
- Visitors: 1,066,511 (2016)

The Museo Universitario Arte Contemporáneo ("University Museum of Contemporary Art"), also known as MUAC, is a large contemporary art museum located within the main campus of the National Autonomous University of Mexico (UNAM). It opened in November 2008 and it is the first Mexican public museum exclusively focused to the arts created in the XXI century.

In 2013 Mexican curator Cuauhtémoc Medina was appointed curator in chief. In 2015 adjunct curators Amanda de la Garza and Alejandra Labastida were included in the 25 women curators on the rise list.

== Architecture ==
The building was designed by Teodoro González de León, who also designed the Museo Rufino Tamayo, the COLMEX building and co-designed the National Auditorium (Auditorio Nacional) with Abraham Zabludovsky. The MUAC is part of the University Cultural Center (Centro Cultural Universitario) a massive arquitectural complex encompassing different auditoriums, galleries, libraries and research facilities. The building is characterized by its minimalist inclined glass façade that contrasts with the surrounding architecture, most of it designed in the 1970s. The spacious halls with high ceilings are suitable for exhibiting a wide range of art media.

The esplanade in front of the museum features the large-scale sculpture La espiga by Mexican artist Rufino Tamayo. Made with carbon steel and rising over 18 meters tall.

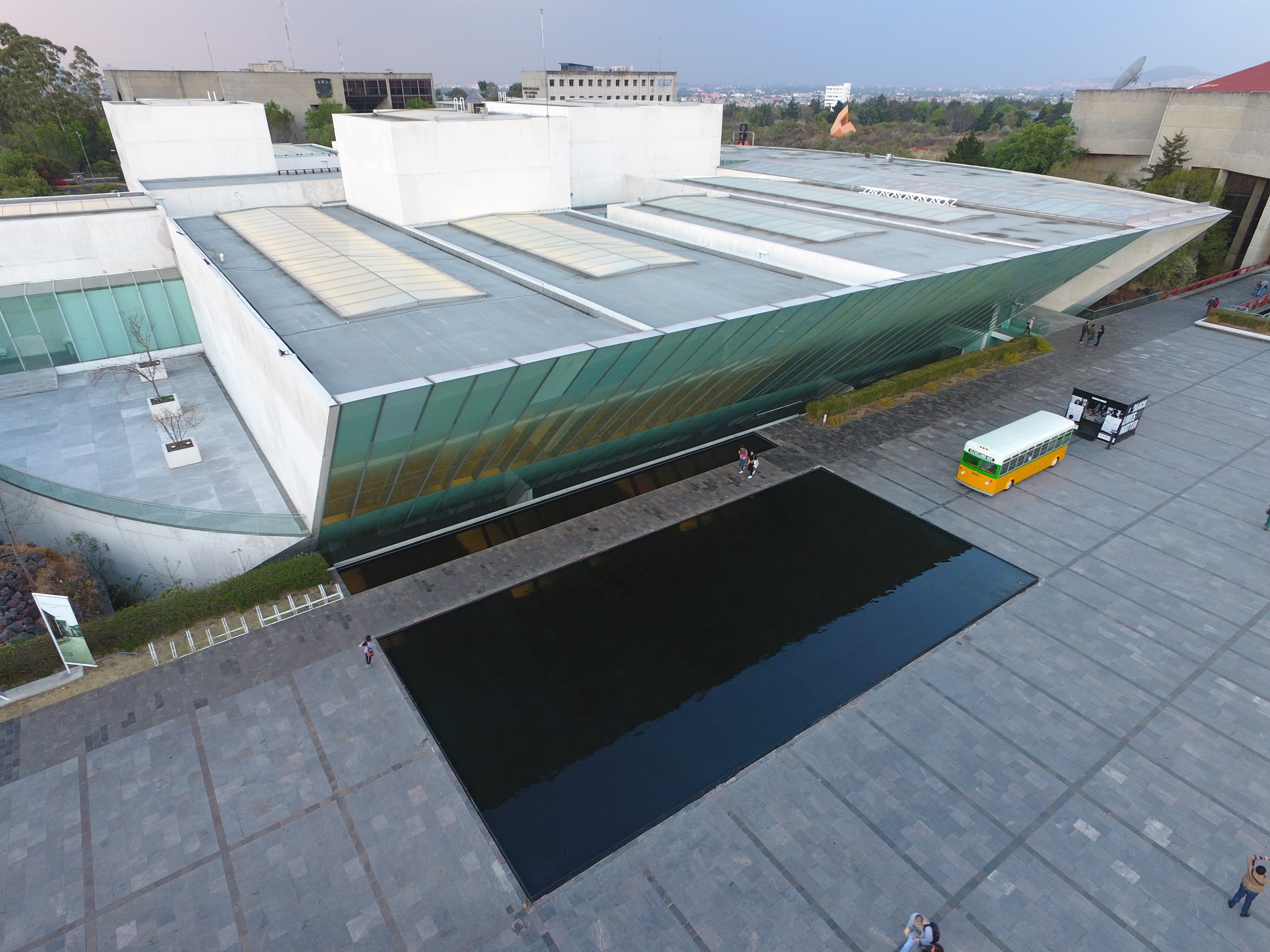
Aerial view of the front.

== Collection ==
One of the main objectives of the museum was to bring together a collection that could function as the main point of reference for Mexican art created after 1968. However some of the collection artworks date back to 1952, a symbolic date since that is the year in which Ciudad Universitaria (the main campus of UNAM) was inaugurated. The 1968 student movement and other influential political fights such as the 1994 Zapatista uprising are considered as important conceptual frameworks that give shape to the assortment of this artistic and documentary repertoire.

The collection brings together works from more than 300 artists, including names such as: Francis Alÿs, Carlos Amorales, Julieta Aranda, Tania Candiani, Abraham Cruzvillegas, Minerva Cuevas, Jose Dávila, Julio Galán, Mario García Torres, Alberto Gironella, Mathias Goeritz, the SEMEFO Project, Graciela Iturbide, Daniel Lezama, Sarah Minter, Yoshua Okón, Gabriel Orozco, Fernando Palma Rodríguez, Pedro Reyes, David Alfaro Siqueiros, Pablo Vargas Lugo, among many others.

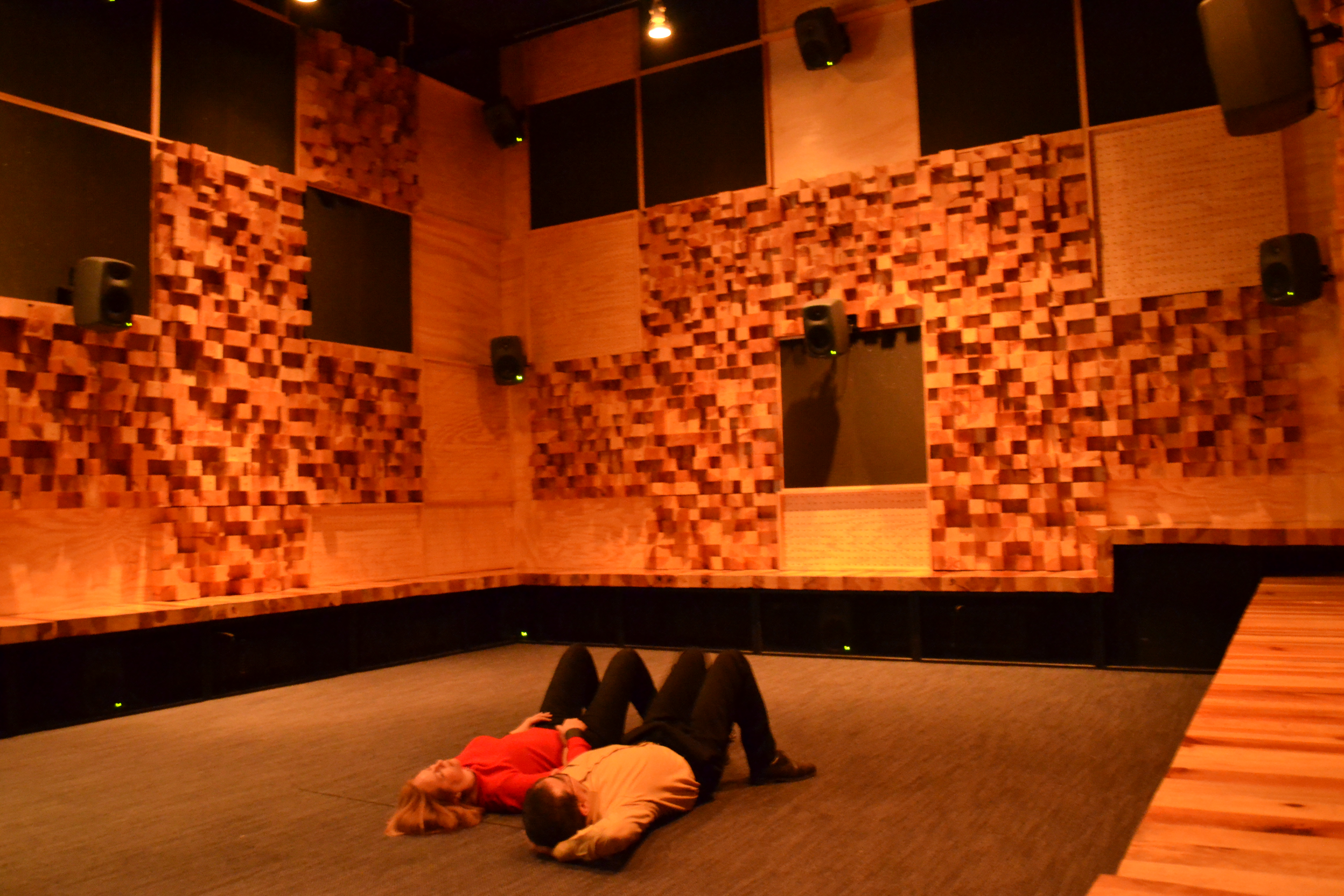
MUAC Sound Camera
