= Ben Crystal =

British actor, writer and producer (born 1977)

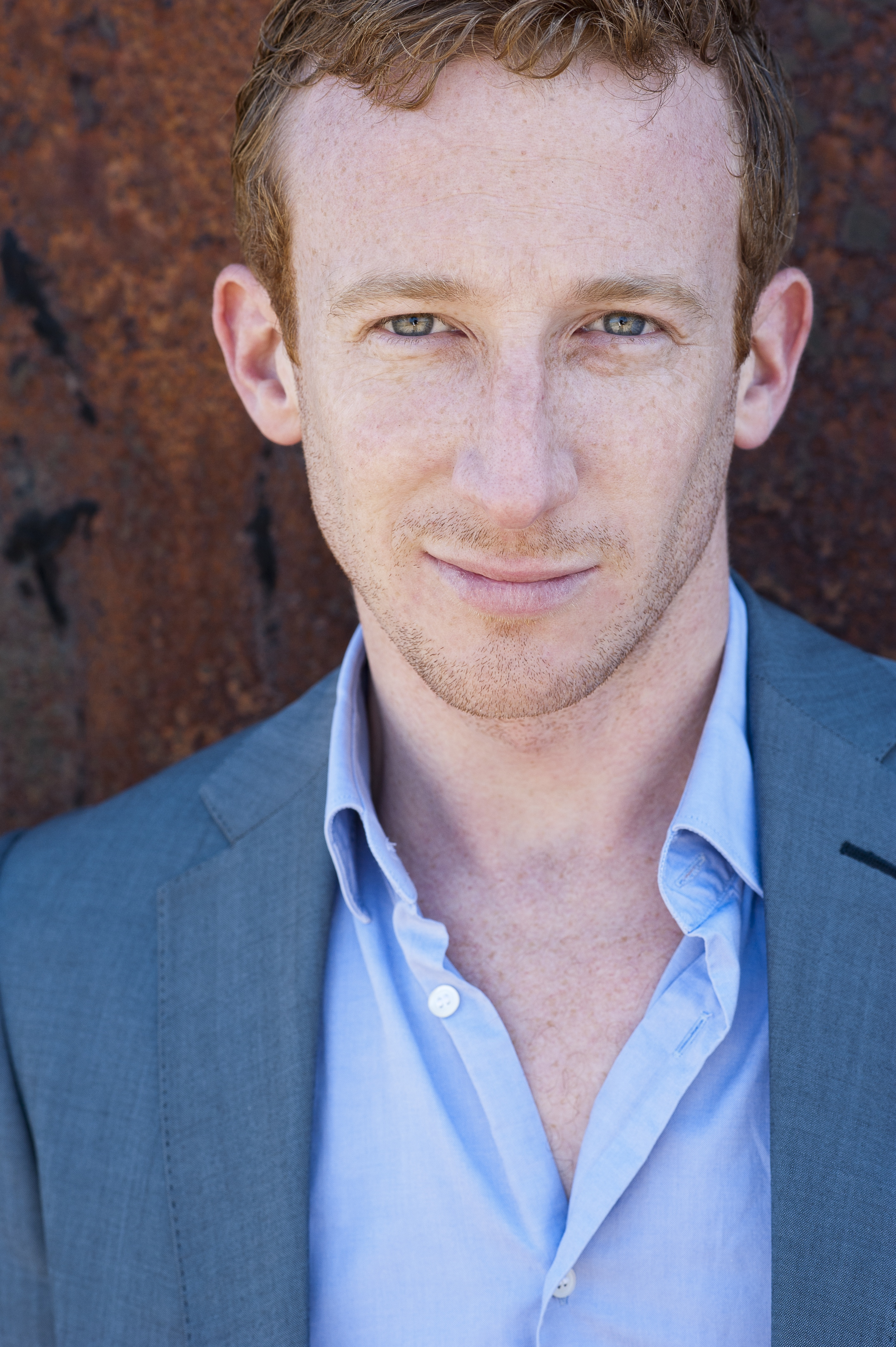
- Crystal in 2013
- Born: 1977 (age 48–49); Ascot, England
- Occupations: Actor, author, producer
- Parent(s): David Crystal; Hilary Crystal
- Website: bencrystal.com

Ben Crystal (born 1977) is an English actor, author, and producer, best known for his work on performing and promoting William Shakespeare and adapting original practices.

== Background and career ==
Crystal was born in Ascot, Berkshire, the son of linguist David Crystal, and grew up in Wokingham and Holyhead, North Wales. He studied English and linguistics at Lancaster University between 1995 and 1998, before training as an actor.

== Acting and curation ==
His acting career included an appearance in the 2006 summer season at Shakespeare's Globe Theatre, playing a role in Titus Andronicus.

He has curated Shakespeare explorations for Shakespeare's Globe, the Savannah Music Festival, and the Swedish Radio Symphony Orchestra.

He created the Passion in Practice Shakespeare Ensemble in 2010 and curated it through 2016.

In 2013, as curator, producer and creative director of CDs released by the British Library, he produced recordings of Shakespeare's speeches and sonnets in the original pronunciation. In 2016, he curated the British Library's Shakespeare Birthday celebrations.

In 2014 (Passion in Practice) were awarded one of the inaugural Owle Schreame Awards for innovation in historical theatre for their work on Original Shakespearean Pronunciation in performance.

He has been the curator of the Shakespeare Ensemble since 2018. In the summer of 2018 he invited artists to North Wales to raise an adaptation of A Midsummer Night's Dream in five days. The Dreame Project was free for all and used 16th-century lute music, five-metre tall Bunraku puppets and a deck of clowns. The audience and Ensemble shared a locally foraged organic meal at the end of the project.

In their 2019 tour of Japan, they raised three plays in seven days. Using modern reworking of Elizabethan rehearsal practices they reimagined the pieces with every pass, and welcomed resonances from modern Kabuki practices.

In 2020 the Shakespeare Ensemble explored collaboration at distance and interrogated the digital arts with their 2020 experimental virtual theatrical promenade, What You Will. It was lauded as "the next iteration of digital theatre" as the promenade theatre style allowed the viewer to decide their narrative route. 2020 also saw Ben Crystal take an involvement in the online series The Show Must Go Online, providing the introduction to The Two Gentlemen of Verona, and playing the titular role in Timon of Athens.

== Original pronunciation ==
He has worked with his father David Crystal as advisors on the production of plays in the original pronunciation at the Globe Theatre and they explored original pronunciation in the newly finished Sam Wanamaker Playhouse, Shakespeare's Globe over 2014–2016.

Following on from his father's work, he has frequently explored original pronunciation.

Crystal recorded the opening speech from Richard III for the British Library's Evolving English exhibition in 2010–11.

He has also acted in other productions in the original pronunciation with other companies, for example playing the title roles in Hamlet, and Richard II, and produced works through ensembles he has started or is involved in.

In 2014, he produced an Original Pronunciation production of Macbeth at the Sam Wanamaker Playhouse. He continued with this project at the Wanamaker with Henry V in 2015 and Dr. Faustus in 2016. In 2015, his company the Crystal Ensemble performed Pericles at Daniel Harding's Interplay Festival in the Swedish Radio Symphony Orchestra's Berwaldhallen in Stockholm, with Crystal in the lead role. They performed again at the Savannah Music Festival.

== Writing and talks ==
Crystal's book Shakespeare on Toast: Getting a Taste for the Bard, was shortlisted for the 2010 Educational Writers Award. Since its publication, he has given workshops and talks on Shakespeare work.

Crystal has also co-written several books with his father. They started writing Shakespeare's Words: A Glossary and Language Companion after finding that A Shakespeare glossary by Charles Talbut Onions has a number of omissions. Other works include The Oxford Illustrated Dictionary of Shakespeare, the latter being shortlisted for the Educational Writer of the Year Award in 2016.

In 2014, to celebrate the 450th birthday of Shakespeare, the British Council and the English-Speaking Union welcomed Crystal to give a talk, "Speaking the Bright and Beautiful English of Shakespeare", which he offered again at York in 2019.

In 2017, Crystal gave a TED talk, "Original Practice – Shakespeare's Craft".

In 2024, Crystal and his father were the featured guests on the Folger Shakespeare Library podcast, Shakespeare Unlimited discussing their work on Shakespearean quotations.

== Publications ==
- Shakespeare's Words: A Glossary and Language Companion (2002) with David Crystal
- The Shakespeare Miscellany (2005) with David Crystal
- Shakespeare on Toast (2008) – shortlisted for the 2010 Educational Writer of the Year Award
- Sorry, I'm British! (2010) with Adam Russ and Ed McLachlan
- Springboard Shakespeare: King Lear (2013)
- Springboard Shakespeare: Macbeth (2013)
- Springboard Shakespeare: Hamlet (2013)
- Springboard Shakespeare: A Midsummer Night's Dream (2013)
- You Said Potato (2014) with David Crystal
- The Oxford Illustrated Dictionary of Shakespeare (2016) with David Crystal — shortlisted for the Educational Writer of the Year Award, 2016
- Everyday Shakespeare: Lines for Life (2023) with David Crystal
