= Miguel Pérez Alvarado =

Spanish poet (born 1979)

Miguel Pérez Alvarado (born 1979 in Las Palmas, Gran Canaria, Spain) is a Spanish poet.

== Education and career ==
Between 1997 and 2003, he studied journalism and political science in Madrid. He currently writes from Canary Islands.

His writing, whatever the genre, intends to strain thinking and language poetic nature to its mutual indistinctibility.

Following his first book in 2001 (Teoría de la Luz) he has published several poem books and essays and has edited diverse authors works. Besides, an anthology of his writings and works have been published in diverse papers such as Caliban, 2C-La Opinión de Tenerife, Cuadernos del Matemático, ABC-Cultural, Piedra y Cielo Digital, La Revue des Belles-Lettres, Revista Fogal, Cultura la Provincia y la Revista de la Academia Canaria de la Lengua.

== Award ==
In 2000, he was awarded the Tomás Morales Poetry Prize for his book Teoría de la luz - amor mas vivo, establishing him as one of the promising young talents of Canarian poetry.

== Notes ==
- The prize is awarded biennially by to Casa-Museo Tomás Morales in Gran Canaria to commemorate the 19th-Century Canarian poet Tomás Morales .
