= Miguel Perez (American actor) =

American actor

- Portrait of Perez
- Born: Arnoldo Cruz Perez; September 7, 1957 (age 68); San Jose, California, U.S.
- Education: Andrew Hill High School; National Shakespeare Conservatory
- Occupation: Actor
- Years active: 1989–present
- Spouses: Kaye Freeman (m. 2018) Lisa Spigai (m. 1987; div. 2011)
- Children: 1

Arnoldo Cruz "Miguel" Perez (born September 7, 1957) is an American actor. He has appeared in many television series, films, and stage productions.

== Career ==
Perez has appeared in such television shows as: The Wonder Years, Beverly Hills, 90210, Chicago Hope, Frasier (Carlos 'The Barracuda' Del Gato) 24 (Ranger Mike Kramer), and CSI: Crime Scene Investigation. However his most reputed role was Luis in an episode of Seinfeld ("The Cheever Letters"). In the episode, he played a Cuban man who dealt Cuban Cigars to Cosmo Kramer in return for his jacket. He became friends with Luis and his gang and they even became golf partners in Westchester County.

== Filmography ==
=== Film ===
Year	Title	Role	Notes
1990	A Shock to the System	Transit Cop	
1994	Clear and Present Danger	DEA Agent #1	
1996	Up Close and Personal	WMIA Floor Manager	
1997	8 Heads in a Duffel Bag	Customs Inspector	
1999	Magnolia	Avi Solomon	
2001	Blow	Alessandro	
2001	A.I. Artificial Intelligence	Robot Repairman	
2001	Ocean's Eleven	Explosives Cop	
2002	Hourly Rates	Marvin	
2004	Million Dollar Baby	Restaurant Owner	
2005	Venus on the Halfshell	Sam Zelinski	
2005	Angels with Angles	Delgado	
2006	Soul's Midnight	Ramos	
2013	The Face of Love	Bartender	
2017	The Case for Christ	Fr. Jose Maria Marquez	
2017	Negative	Tony	
2017	The Ascent	Henry Cardenas	
2017	12 Round Gun	Trinidad	
2018	Unbroken: Path to Redemption	Father Cardarelli	
2021	Xico's Journey	Señor Caradura	

=== Television ===
Year	Title	Role	Notes
1992	Seinfeld	Luis	Episode: "The Cheever Letters"
1993	Wonder Years	Band Leader	Episode: "Independence Day"
1997	Frasier	Carlos Del Gato	Episode: "Voyage of the Damned"
2002	24	Mike Kramer	Episode: "Day 2: 8:00pm-9:00pm
2020	The Show Must Go Online	Petruchio, Catesby, Ghost of Hamlet's Father & Apemantus	Various episodes
