= Miguel (surname) =

Miguel is a surname of Spanish and Portuguese origin.

== Notable people with last name Miguel ==
- Amanda Miguel (born 1956), Argentine singer
- Ana Victoria (born 1983), American singer
- Ángel Miguel (1929-2009), Spanish golfer
- Aurelio Miguel (born 1964), Brazilian judoka and politician
- Barbara Miguel (born 2004), Filipino actress
- Edward Miguel (born 1974), American economist
- Florian Miguel (born 1996), French soccer player
- Girlyn Miguel (born 1948), Vincentian politician
- Jose Miguel (born 1969), Argentine goalkeeper and soccer player
- Lorenzo Miguel (1927–2002), Argentine labor activist
- Marta Pérez Miguel (born 1994), Spanish athlete
- Mónica Miguel (1936–2020), Mexican actress
- Muriel Miguel (born 1937), Native American theatre director and choreographer
- Nigel Miguel (born 1963), Belizean actor, film commissioner and basketball player
- Tomas Rochez (born 1964), Honduran soccer player

== See also ==
- Michael (surname)
