= Tania Bruguera =

Cuban artist and activist (born 1968)

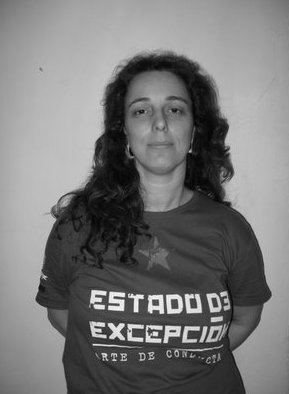
- Havana, 2009
- Born: Tania Brugueras; 1968 (age 57–58); Havana, Cuba
- Education: Instituto Superior de Arte; School of the Art Institute of Chicago
- Known for: Artist and activist
- Notable work: Displacement (1989-99), Untitled (Havana, 2000), Tatlin's Whisper #5 (2008)
- Movement: Performance Art, installation and video
- Father: Miguel Brugueras
- Awards: Guggenheim Fellowship (1998); Prince Claus Prize (2000); Velázquez Award for Plastic Arts
- Website: www.taniabruguera.com

Tania Bruguera (born 1968 in Havana, Cuba) is a Cuban artist and activist who focuses on installation and performance art. She lives in Cambridge, Massachusetts where she works as head of media and performance at Harvard University. Bruguera has participated in numerous international exhibitions. her work is in the permanent collections of many institutions, including the Museum of Modern Art and Bronx Museum of the Arts and the Museo Nacional de Bellas Artes de La Habana.

Bruguera's work pivots around issues of power and control, and several of her works interrogate and re-present events in Cuban history. As a result of her artistic actions and activism, Bruguera has been arrested and jailed several times by the Cuban authorities.

== Biography ==
She was born Tania Brugueras, the daughter of diplomat and politician Miguel Brugueras, but at the age of 18 changed her name to Bruguera, "her first act of political rebellion".

With her father being a diplomat and minister in the Fidel Castro government, Tania moved three times throughout her childhood. Her father's career took the family to Paris (1973–1974), Lebanon (1974–1977), and Panama (1977–1979). In 1979, two years after her third move, Bruguera decided to return to Cuba.

Bruguera studied at the Instituto Superior de Arte in Havana and then earned an M.F.A. in performance from the School of the Art Institute of Chicago. She is the founder and director of Catédra Arte de Conducta (behavior art school), the first performance studies program in Latin America, which is hosted by Instituto Superior de Arte in Havana. From 2003 through 2010, she was an assistant professor at the Department of Visual Arts of the University of Chicago, United States and is an invited professor at the Università Iuav di Venezia in Venice, Italy.

In 2021, Bruguera departed Cuba in exchange for the Cuban government freeing activists imprisoned in that year after she got a job offer from Harvard University.

== Work ==
In 1985–96, after the death of Ana Mendieta, Bruguera created a series of performances titled Tribute to Ana Mendieta, a site-specific piece in which Bruguera recreates objects and performances created by Mendieta.

Bruguera's 1997 work The Burden of Guilt (El peso de la culpa) was the artist's take on a story of mass suicide of a group of indigenous Cubans who have consumed large amounts of soil in order to show their resistance to the Spanish occupation. Bruguera interpreted their act of eating dirt as "a weapon of resistance." In her performance, Bruguera stood, naked, with a lamb carcass hanging from her neck, creating both a physical and symbolic burden. For 45 minutes, she consumed soil mixed with water and salt, representing tears. As Edward Rubin described it, "the harrowing piece was first performed in Havana, where the audience was duly reminded that freedom, liberty, and self-determination are not abstract ideals, but achievements that deeply inscribe their meaning on our physical being."

In 1998–1999 Bruguera created a behavior art piece titled "Destierro"(Displacement). This piece of work resembles the power figure ‘Nikis Nkonde’ and is supposed to draw attention to the empty promises the Cuban government made to its people during the revolution. With this piece of art Tania calls upon the Cuban people to take an active stance and demand that the Cuban government finally fulfill their promises.

In 2002 Bruguera founded the Cátedra Arte de Conducta (Behavior Art School) in Havana to provide a space for the training of alternative art studies in contemporary Cuban society. The focus of the Cátedra was to educate young Cuban artists on diverse styles of art, and to show how art could be used as a tool for the transformation of ideology. Additionally, the Cátedra itself can be understood as an artwork in the manner of institutional critique, social practice, or parasitism, with Bruguera re-formulating the institutional frameworks of the Cuban national art school, the Havana Bienal, and the money- and influence-fueled international art circuit to unintended purposes. "Using her position within this social milieu, Bruguera advanced the careers of her [Cátedra] students by exhibiting their artworks as her own participation in the Havana Bienal."

Bruguera's performance in Havana at the Havana Biennial of Tatlin's Whisper #6 2009 generated great controversy. During the performance Bruguera put up a microphone and told people in attendance they could say whatever they wanted for one minute. Performers wearing military fatigues placed a white bird upon each speaker's shoulders, referencing the famed incident when a dove rested on Fidel Castro's shoulder during his speech declaring revolutionary victory in January 1959. Various of the attendees use the opportunity to ask for “freedom” and “democracy”. One of these was the renowned dissident blogger Yoani Sánchez. The Cuban government denounced this in a statement saying that it considered “this to be an anti-cultural event of shameful opportunism that offends Cuban artists and foreigners who came to offer their work and solidarity."

In 2011, Bruguera began working on Immigrant Movement International, a multi-part artwork expected to continue through 2015. Bruguera began in 2011 by spending a year living in a small apartment in Corona, Queens, with five immigrants and their children. She was interested in experiencing some problems immigrants without residency papers encountered trying to survive on low pay and without health insurance. The project, funded by the Queens Museum of Art and a nonprofit arts group called Creative Time, also involved opening a storefront in New York where Bruguera wanted to hold arts workshops for immigrants, but found that most of the people who came to the store were interested in learning English or help finding employment or legal aid.

In 2012, she presented Surplus Value, a participatory work as part of the larger project of Immigrant Movement International at Tate Modern. In order to enter Surplus Value, museum visitors waited in a long line, and they were required to pass a polygraph test about their visa applications. The exhibition space contained four reproductions of signs from Nazi labor camps.

In 2013, she initiated the project The Museum of Arte Útil in collaboration with Queens Museum of Art in New York and the Van Abbemuseum in Eindhoven (NL). Arte Útil in Spanish roughly translates as useful art, but also suggests art as a device or tool. Arte Útil imagines, creates and implements socially beneficial outcomes. The Museum of Arte Útil evolved in the Asociación de Arte Útil, a new, international membership organisation that seeks to promote and implement Arte Útil. Alistair Hudson, director of the Middlesbrough Institute of Modern Art (MIMA) is co-director with Bruguera of the Asociación.

In 2017, Bruguera proposed herself as a candidate in the 2018 Cuban Presidential Election in a video called #YoMePropongo en Cuba. In this project, she challenges the audience to imagine what they would do to create a better future Cuba, if they were elected president. To date, Bruguera has received 70 video responses from everyday Cubans expressing their desires to reform the corrupt government, include affordable housing, and improve their weak economy.

In 2018, she was the recipient of a commission for the Tate Modern's Turbine Hall. For the installation, Bruguera covered part of the floor with heat-sensitive black paint; when visitors sat or lay upon it, part of a vast portrait of a Syrian refugee beneath was revealed. Curator Catherine Wood explained, "It is a call to action, because there's no way that you can see this picture unless you join together with many, many other people."

In 2021, the Pérez Art Museum Miami acquired Bruguera's work El peso de la culpa (The Burden of Guilt) as part of the institution's new acquisitions initiative.

Bruguera has participated in numerous international exhibitions, including Documenta 11 (2002), Documenta fifteen (2022), the Bienal Iberoamericana in Lima, Peru (2002), the Istanbul Biennial (2003), the Shanghai Biennale (2004), and the Gwangju Biennale in Gwangju, Korea (2008). Her work is also in the permanent collections of many institutions around the world, including the Museum of Modern Art and Bronx Museum of the Arts in New York and the Museo Nacional de Bellas Artes de La Habana.

In 2015 she founded the Hannah Arendt (INSTAR) Institute of Artivism, an organization to promote, civic education, freedom of expression through art and activism. The institute also founded the Instar Film Festival, which promotes independent cinema.

She has appeared in Miguel Coyula’s films Blue Heart in 2021 and Chronicles of the Absurd in 2024.

=== Activism ===
Bruguera was arrested and released three times in the time frame of December 2014 through January 2015 for having organized a public performance in La Havana's Plaza de la Revolución. She was detained with several other Cuban artists, activists, bloggers and journalists who participated in the 'Yo Tambien Exijo' campaign. The campaign arose after Raúl Castro and Barack Obama’s declarations on December 17, 2014 about the restoration of diplomatic ties, potentially bringing an end to five decades of hostility. The first arrests were made on Tuesday, December 30, after Bruguera announced a public performance with the intention of leaving an open microphone available to Cubans to allow them to freely express their thoughts. The performance, titled Tatlin’s wisper #6 – Havana Version, was already staged in 2009 during the 10th Havana Biennial. During Tatlin's Whisper #5 (2008), participants at Tate Modern's Turbine Hall, where the performance happened, were confronted by mounted police officers, who confronted them down as though compromised with a beginning riot.

The event attracted widespread media coverage both in favor and against her action and a public letter in support of Tania addressed to Raúl Castro was written and signed by over a thousand people across the globe. The letter stated: "We firmly believe her detention, and the withdrawal of her Cuban passport, are inappropriate responses to a work of art that simply sought to open space for public discussion." Eventually she was released and the Cuban government returned Tania Bruguera's passport on July 10, 2015, six months after confiscating it.

In December 2015, Bruguera announced that she may still return to Cuba. She said that during the time of her detention she only agreed to leave under two conditions: that dissidents who were arrested after attending her aborted performance in Revolution Square be released; and that the Cuban government give her a signed and stamped letter guaranteeing that she could return to Cuba.

On March 3, 2016, she launched a Kickstarter campaign to raise funds for INSTAR (Institute of Artivism Hannah Arendt). The Institute focuses on creating bridges of trust, peaceful and considered responses in times of hardship, and to create a place where people with different political views can come together to build a better country. Patrons of the Kickstarter campaign were offered to have a message of their choice delivered to the Cuban government during Bruguera’s next interrogation.

In October 2017, Tania Bruguera announced that she would be running for "President of Cuba", when the current President Raul Castro (brother of Fidel Castro) steps down. Bruguera has stated that the satirical performance is an act to expose the fact of Cuba being a one party state that is not elected by the people. She is hoping to enact change with bringing to light this reality, removing the culture of fear.

Bruguera was arrested in December 2018 in advance of a planned protest against a Cuban law (Decree 349) that would require artists to apply for government licenses. On December 6, 2018, Bruguera was released from jail after three days along with a dozen other artists and activists for organizing sit-in protests against Decree 349. However, her sister informed 'The Art Newspaper' that the Cuban authorities were keeping her under house arrest and they were building a penal case against the artist. Bruguera filed a lawsuit against the Cuban government for defamation after the publication of information that sought to "damag[e] [the artist] and [her] family, psychologically, socially, and professionally," was published in state-run media publications Granma newspaper, Razones de Cuba, and La Jiribilla.

In October 2020, Bruguera denounced feeling extreme physical discomfort due to a high-pitched sound that she heard in her own home in Havana. The sound and symptoms that she described are similar to those known as the Havana syndrome.
