= Miguel Pérez Carreño =

Miguel Pérez Carreño (1904–1966) was a Venezuelan physician, researcher, scientist, university professor and writer. He was born in Valencia, Carabobo (Venezuela) on September 28, 1904 and died in Caracas on June 22, 1966). He was the son of Venezuelan Government physician, doctor and lawyer Luis Pérez-Carreño and Doña Encarnación Espinal. He was part of a distinguished family, consisting of figures such as Simón Rodríguez and Teresa Carreño. He taught several generations of surgeons. The hospital belonging to the Venezuelan Institute of Social Security, located in El Pescozón to the west of Caracas, bears his name.

== Education ==
For elementary school Pérez-Carreño attended the Bouquet school and high school at the Federal College of Valencia. He graduated with a bachelor's degree from the Central University of Venezuela with his thesis called Calor animal (Animal heat). In 1920 he re-entered the university to study medicine and before graduating he worked as a clinical monitor. He earned a Ph.D. in Medical Sciences in October 1926 with the presentation of the thesis Autoseroterapia de los derrames (Auto-serum therapy of effusions) and then devoted himself largely as a teacher. Between 1933 and 1934 he completed his academic training at hospitals in New York City, Paris and Vienna.

== Career ==
Perez-Carreño cultivated a practical, investigative and academic approach to medicine. He considered diagnosis an art that had to be accomplished not only through clinical history, but through long, sustained, conversation with the patient about their health problems and living conditions. According to Dr. Elias Rodriguez Azpurua, Perez-Carreño possessed the innate qualities of a teacher, among which stood out: his facility with words, his practicality to focus on issues and clinical cases in a comprehensible manner, using appropriate and pleasant language and making associations between clinical experiences and operative anecdotes experienced by him.

Beginning in 1936, he conducted research and descriptions on colorectal pericolonic appendicular syndrome caused by parasites, and eight years later presented a paper on this topic at the National Academy of Medicine, the importance of which focused on developing a surgical treatment for the disease.

He worked on the study, analysis and evaluation of definitive treatment for surgical diseases. In Venezuela he did a series of interventions including pasacro nerve resection in the treatment of pelvic neuralgia, resection of the rectum with contra natura permanent anum, (1932), ovarian homografts (1936), the new technique of lymphatic blockade in infectious processes, carried out with electrosurgery linked with sulfonamide therapy (1938), the radical cure of rectal prolapse with fascia lata (aponeurosis of the thigh) ligation of the femoral artery by gangrene and embolectomy by phlebitis. He also contributed to improving the treatment of Banti syndrome (abnormal growth of the spleen) and portal hypertension (usually caused by liver cirrhosis).

Active in the Caracas Polyclinic, the José María Vargas Hospital and the University Hospital, Perez-Carreño was head of descriptive practical anatomy procedures, Head of surgical medicine, Chief of Clinical Surgery and Dean of the Faculty of Medicine, among other duties. He spent part of his last years on cancer research.

Miguel Perez-Carreno died in Caracas on June 22, 1966.

== Works and accomplishments ==
- Perez-Carreño published over 100 scientific research and a five volume work: Patología y Clínica Quirúrgica. (Pathology and Clinical Surgery).
- He directed over 20 degree works at the UCV.
- He founded the Venezuelan Society of Surgery and the Department of Research and Experimental Surgery of the Clinical Chair and Therapeutics at the Faculty of Medicine of the UCV.
- He established surgical services at the J.M. de los Rios Hospital.
