= Carlos Amorales =

Mexican artist

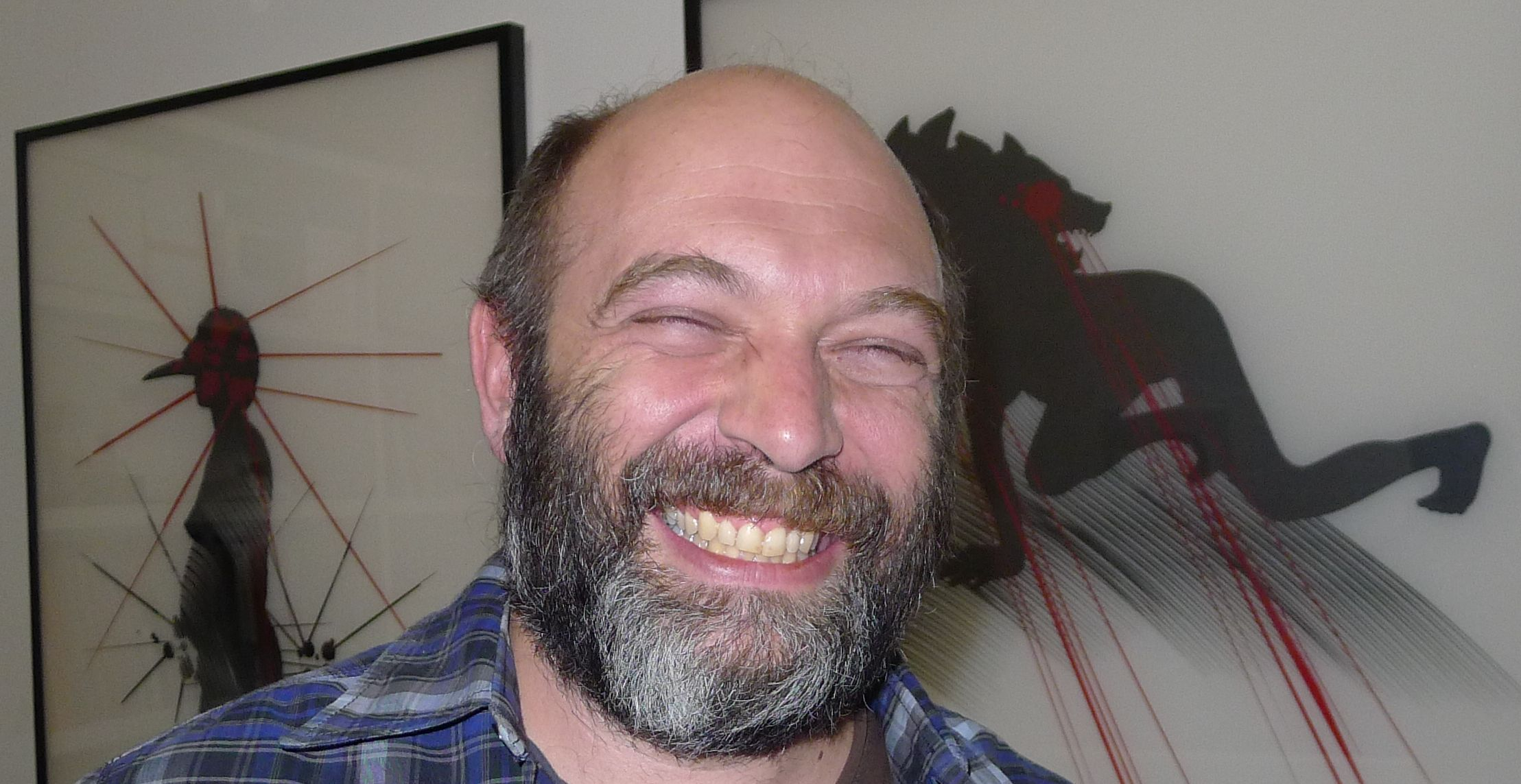
- Carlos Amorales 2011 in his studio in Mexico City
- Born: 1970; Mexico City
- Known for: Performance art, Animation, Painting, Drawing, Sculpture

Carlos Amorales (Mexico City, 1970) is a multidisciplinary artist who studied at the Gerrit Rietveld Academy and the Rijksakademie in Amsterdam. The most extensive researches in his work encompass Los Amorales (1996-2001), Liquid Archive (1999–2010), Nuevos Ricos (2004–2009), and a typographic exploration in junction with cinema (2013–present).

== Biography ==
Carlos Amorales (Mexico City, 1970) lives and works in Mexico. He is a multidisciplinary artist who studied at the Gerrit Rietveld Academy and the Rijksakademie in Amsterdam. He has participated in residencies with Atelier Calder, Saché, France (2012); Mac/Val, Val-de-Marne, France (2011); and the Smithsonian Artists Research Fellowship, Washington, D.C. (2010).

== Career ==
Amorales works in a variety of media, including video, animation, painting, drawing, sculpture, and performance. Much of his work explores the limits of language and translation systems to venture into the field of cultural experimentation. He uses graphic production as a tool to develop linguistic structures and alternative working models that allow new forms of interpretation and foster collectivity. In his projects, Amorales examines identity-construction processes, proposes a constant re-signification of forms present in his work, and provokes a clash between art and pop culture.

Since 1998 Amorales has been building his "Liquid Archive", a digital database of his drawings in the form of vector graphics which he uses to produce visual compositions in various media. The graphics, birds, spiders, trees, and kneeling figures in blacks, reds, and grays reappear throughout his work and provide his signature style. In 2007, Amorales lent his "Liquid Archive" to the Dutch graphic-design duo Mevis & Van Deursen (Armand Mevis and Linda van Deursen) who collaborated with Amorales to produce the book "Carlos Amorales: Liquid Archive, Why Fear The Future".

His early works also featured masked Mexican wrestlers inspired by the Lucha libre fighters performing in wrestling rings throughout the world. In 2003, the wrestling performance Amorales v. Amorales was staged at the Tate Modern in London, the Pompidou Center in Paris and the San Francisco Museum of Modern Art. His animation piece, Useless Wonder (2006) was shown at the Miami Basel art fair. Amorales has had solo exhibitions at the MALBA in Buenos Aires, at the Milton Keynes Gallery in Milton Keynes, UK, at the Yvon Lambert Gallery in Paris, at the MUAC in Mexico City, and at the Philadelphia Museum of Art.

In 2008 his exhibition Discarded Spider toured at the Contemporary Arts Center, Cincinnati. For this show, Amorales also staged a performance with the Cincinnati Ballet.

In 2015 his work "Triangle Constellation" was installed in the Calderwood courtyard of the Harvard University Art Museums.

His sculpture "Dark Mirror" is included in the collections of Pérez Art Museum Miami, Florida.

He has had numerous solo exhibitions: "Black Cloud", (The Power Plant, Toronto, 2015); "El Esplendor Geométrico" [The Geometric Splendor], (Kurimanzutto, México, 2015); "Germinal" (Museo Tamayo, México, 2013); "Nuevos Ricos" (Kunsthalle Fridericianum, Kassel, 2010); "Four Animations, Five Drawings and a Plague" ( Philadelphia Museum of Art, 2008); and "Discarded Spider" (Cincinnati Art Center, 2008), to mention a few.

== Exhibitions ==
Amorales has exhibited in many solo and group exhibitions, including:

=== Select solo exhibitions ===
- Germinal, Museo Rufino Tamayo, Mexico City (2013)
- Four Animations, Five Drawings, and a Plague, Philadelphia Museum of Art (2008)

=== Select group exhibitions ===
- 50th Venice Biennale, Dutch Pavilion (2003)
- PERFORMA07, New York (2007)
- Martian Museum of Terrestrial Art, Barbican Centre (2008)
- Manifesta 9 (2012)
- Sharjah Biennial 11 (2013)
- Liverpool Biennial (2014)
- What We Have Overlooked, Framed Framed (2016)

== Public collections ==
The artist's work is featured in many public collections, including:

- Cisneros Foundation, New York
- La Colección Jumex, Mexico City
- Guggenheim Museum, New York
- Irish Museum of Modern Art, Dublin
- Margulies Collection, Miami
- Minneapolis Institute of Art
- Museo Rufino Tamayo, Mexico City
- Museo Universitario Arte Contemporáneo, Mexico City
- Museum of Modern Art, New York
- Museum Boijmans van Beuningen, Rotterdam
- Pérez Art Museum Miami
- Philadelphia Museum of Art
- Walker Art Center, Minneapolis

== Art market ==
Amorales is represented by kurimanzutto in Mexico City.
