= Miguel Ojopi =

Bolivian politician (born 1967)

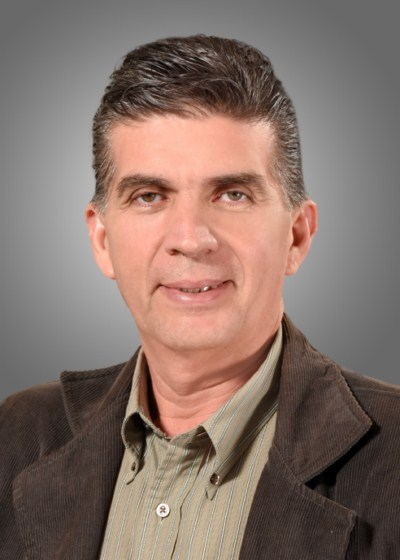
- Official portrait, 2017

Member of the Chamber of Deputies from Pando
- In office 18 January 2015 – 3 November 2020
- Substitute: Yeimy Peña
- Preceded by: Galo Silvestre
- Succeeded by: Sergio Maniguary
- Constituency: Party list

Constituent of the Constituent Assembly from Pando
- In office 6 August 2006 – 14 December 2007
- Constituency: Party list

Personal details
- Born: Miguel Santa Lucía Ojopi Sosa; 14 December 1967 (age 58) Cobija, Pando, Bolivia
- Party: Revolutionary Nationalist Movement
- Education: Technical University of Beni
- Occupation: Businessman; politician

Miguel Santa Lucía Ojopi Sosa (born 14 December 1967), often referred to as Yaco, is a Bolivian businessman and politician who served as a party-list member of the Chamber of Deputies from Pando from 2015 to 2020. A member of the Revolutionary Nationalist Movement, Ojopi entered politics as the party's departmental leader for Pando. In 2006, he was elected to serve as a party-list member of the Constituent Assembly for Pando from 2006 to 2007. After unsuccessfully contesting the Cobija mayoralty in 2010, Ojopi was elected to represent Pando in the Chamber of Deputies. As with other Revolutionary Nationalist Movement deputies elected as part of the Democratic Unity alliance, Ojopi split with the coalition shortly after assuming office, composing part of a quaternary opposition caucus in the lower chamber for the duration of his term.

== Early life and career ==
Miguel Ojopi was born on 14 December 1967 in Cobija, Pando. He is a member of the Baure tribe, a small grouping of indigenous peoples native to the eastern Beni Department. Despite his primarily Amerindian roots, Ojopi considers himself, first and foremost, ethnically mestizo, maintaining that he and his parents had "modernized" themselves by adopting urban lifestyles and hence no longer pertained to antiquated tribal cultures. (Note: Such assertions, according to sociologists Cecilia Quiroga and Moira Zuazo, were common among many affluent sectors of the lowland departments, reflecting their readiness to "escape the stigma of being Indian in a racist society" through the "mask of mestizaje", opening avenues for greater social mobility and career opportunity.) Ojopi attended the Technical University of Beni in Trinidad, during which time he became active in student leadership. Upon his return to Cobija, he dedicated himself to commerce, specializing in the almond industry, one of the lowland region's primary agribusiness sectors.

== Early political career ==
Ojopi entered the political field as a member of the Revolutionary Nationalist Movement (MNR), serving as the party's departmental leader for Pando. In contrast to other parties like Solidarity Civic Unity—with which Ojopi's brother, José Carlos, unsuccessfully contested Pando's circumscription 68 in 1997—the MNR had enjoyed a commanding electoral presence in the Pando Department since the country's transition to democracy. This dominance, however, was drastically reduced following the collapse of Gonzalo Sánchez de Lozada's government in 2003, which left the party permanently debilitated nationwide. It was in this context, and hot off the trail of a poor general election result the year prior, that the MNR contested the 2006 Constituent Assembly elections, with Ojopi topping its electoral list in the Pando Department. The party exited the race in a distant fourth place, a margin that, while small, still permitted it one constituent in the incoming assembly.

As a constituent, Ojopi pushed for the codification of departmental autonomy for Pando and the other eight departments, a primary policy priority articulated by most conservative currents opposed to the ruling Movement for Socialism (MAS-IPSP). Additionally, Ojopi was one of several opposition constituents who vocalized their rejection of the Constituent Assembly as a stage for "folkloric" representation. For figures like Ojopi, the assembly was "serious business", where slogans of constitutional representation for indigenous peoples, the peasantry, and "those carrying feathers, ponchos, and arrows" had no place. Even after the passage of the 2009 Constitution, Ojopi continued to qualify legislation such as that that required all public officials to speak two State recognized languages as "absurd": "Spanish is the language in which we all understand each other ... everyone speaks Spanish ... I cannot understand ... those who speak Aymara and Quechua ... if I speak Cavineño, who is going to understand me?".

Upon the conclusion of his term in the Constituent Assembly, Ojopi continued to operate in Pando politics. In 2010, he sought the Cobija mayoralty as part of an alliance between the MNR and Popular Consensus (CP). Although CP saw a wide array of victories in nine of Pando's fifteen municipalities, Ojopi narrowly failed to win the capital, being defeated by Ana Lucía Reis, a former MNR partisan who had switched allegiances to the MAS.

== Chamber of Deputies ==
=== Election ===
Four years after his 2010 mayoral loss, Ojopi returned to the national scene, seeking a seat in the Chamber of Deputies on behalf of Democratic Unity (UD). The alliance was made up of the National Unity Front, the Social Democratic Movement, and regional factions of the MNR that, since 2003, had maintained a still-competitive partisan base in the lowland departments. He topped the alliance's party list in the department, winning the seat.

=== Tenure ===
No less than fifteen days after assuming office, Ojopi and the entire group of MNR deputies elected as part of UD broke away from the alliance, establishing their own quaternary caucus within the Chamber of Deputies. Spearheaded by Erik Morón, this caucus operated independently of the other opposition parties for the duration of its term, including presenting its own candidates for committees and commissions. With the support of the MAS, nearly all of its members were elected to leadership roles in parliamentary committees, including Ojopi, who headed the Community Economics Committee. The emergence of the MNR as a separate parliamentary bloc further fractured the already weak opposition, relegating many other deputies to minor roles in legislative administration. Although the MNR ran its own slate of candidates for the 2019 general election, Ojopi was not nominated for a second term. In fact, in the final stretch of the campaign, Ojopi aligned himself with a faction of the MNR in Pando that broke away from the party's presidential candidate Virginio Lema and endorsed the candidacy of Carlos Mesa, whom they viewed as better positioned to defeat the MAS.

==== Commission assignments ====
- Plural Economy, Production, and Industry Commission
  - Community Economics and Social Cooperatives Committee (Secretary; 2015–2016)
  - Agriculture and Animal Husbandry Committee (2019–2020)
- Planning, Economic Policy, and Finance Commission
  - Financial, Monetary, and Insurance Policy Committee (Secretary; 2016–2017, 2018–2019)
- Rural Native Indigenous Peoples and Nations, Cultures, and Interculturality Commission
  - Coca Leaf Committee (2017–2018)

== Electoral history ==
Electoral history of Miguel Ojopi
Year	Office	Party	Alliance	Votes			Result	Ref.
Year	Office	Party	Alliance	Total	%	P.	Result	Ref.
2006	Constituent	Revolutionary Nationalist Movement	None	993	5.56%	4th (Note: Presented on an electoral list. The data shown represents the share of the vote the entire party/alliance received in that constituency.)	Won	
2010	Mayor	Revolutionary Nationalist Movement	Popular Consensus	8,563	42.81%	2nd	Lost	
2014	Deputy	Revolutionary Nationalist Movement	Democratic Unity	19,097	40.95%	2nd	Won	
Source: Plurinational Electoral Organ | Electoral Atlas

Bolivian Constituent Assembly
Seat established	Constituent of the Constituent Assembly from Pando; 2006–2007	Seat dissolved
Chamber of Deputies of Bolivia
Preceded by Galo Silvestre	Member of the Chamber of Deputies from Pando; 2015–2020	Succeeded by Sergio Maniguary
