= Miguel Pérez (water polo) =

Spanish water polo player (born 1967)

Personal information
- Nationality: Spanish
- Born: 22 May 1967 (age 57); Barcelona, Spain

Sport
- Sport: Water polo

Miguel Pérez (born 22 May 1967) is a Spanish water polo player. He competed in the men's tournament at the 1988 Summer Olympics.
