= Nenagh Kemp =

Australian psychologist

Nenagh M. Kemp is a psychologist with the University of Tasmania. She is a specialist in the acquisition, development and use of spoken and written language. She is the associate editor for the Journal of Research in Reading and for Reading and Writing. She is a member of the editorial board of Scientific Studies of Reading.

She has carried out research into the effect of text messaging on literacy about which she jointly wrote a book that was published in 2014.

== Selected publications ==
=== Books ===
- Text Messaging and Literacy - The Evidence. Routledge, Abingdon, 2014. (With C. & B. Plester) ISBN 978-0-415-68716-4

=== Articles ===
- Kemp N, "Texting versus txtng: reading and writing text messages, and links with other linguistic skills", Writing Systems Research, 2, (1) pp. 53–71. ISSN 1758-6801 (2010)
- Kemp N.M., Bryant P., "Do beez buzz? Rule-based and frequency-based knowledge in learning to spell plural -s", Child Development, 74, (1) pp. 63–74. ISSN 0009-3920 (2003) [Refereed Article]
