= Miguel Calderón =

Mexican artist (born 1971)

- Born: 1 June 1971 (age 55); Mexico City, Mexico
- Education: BFA, San Francisco Art Institute (1994)
- Known for: Painting, photography, video, film, installation

Miguel Calderón (born June 1, 1971 in Mexico City) is a Mexican artist. He has worked in paint, photography, video, film and installation.

== Early life and education ==
Calderón received his BFA at the San Francisco Art Institute in 1994.

== Career ==
In the 1990s, along with other artists, he founded the independent art space, La Panadería, in the Condesa neighborhood in Mexico City. Calderón has also worked in collaboration with different publishers and has a varied collection of artists books. Some of his work also appeared in the film The Royal Tenenbaums after director Wes Anderson saw Calderón's work.

== Exhibitions ==
He has solo exhibitions at the Tamayo Contemporary Art Museum in Mexico City, the Andrea Rosen Gallery in New York City, the Museum of Natural History in Mexico City, the San Francisco Art Institute's Diego Rivera Gallery, and the 2004 São Paulo Biennale. In 2021, he had a mid-career survey exhibition at the Museo de Arte Contemporáneo de Monterrey (MARCO), which was also presented in 2022 at Museo Tamayo.

His work has been displayed at, among other places, the Guggenheim Museum's Air: Projections of Mexico exhibit, the Prometer no empobrece: arte contemporáneo mexicano show at the Museo Nacional Centro de Arte Reina Sofia in Madrid, the P.S. 1 Contemporary Art Center in New York City, the 2005 Sharjah Biennale, the 2005 Yokohama Triennale, the 2006 Busan Biennale, and had a film commissioned for the 2006 Frieze Art Fair in London. In 2007, Calderon exhibited with several other Latin American Artists at the San Francisco Museum of Modern Art.

== Critical reception ==
Miguel Calderón has been considered to have "a knack for pushing crass stereotypes and clichés to absurd and provocative extremes." An article in Sculpture magazine called him "something of an international phenom," and the San Francisco Museum of Modern Art referred to him, "[t]he enfant terrible of contemporary art in Mexico." His gallery, kurimanzutto, claims that Calderón "highlights the macabre complexity of man's position in the universe, deftly weaving together mockery, foolishness, social critique and sincerity of emotion."
