= Miguel Brugueras =

Cuban politician and diplomat (1939–2006)

Deputy Minister of Foreign Affairs and Tourism, Cuba
- In office ?

Ambassador of Cuba to Argentina
- In office ?

Ambassador of Cuba to Panama
- In office 1977-1979

Ambassador of Cuba to Lebanon
- In office 1974-1977

Personal details
- Born: Miguel Brugueras del Valle; 1939 Rio de Janeiro, Brazil
- Died: 2006 (aged 66–67)
- Children: 2, including Tania

Miguel Brugueras del Valle (1939–2006) was a Cuban-Brazilian politician and diplomat, and a "devout fidelista".

== Biography ==
During the dictatorship of Batista he was an activist. In 1959, he became a diplomat.

He was born in Rio de Janeiro, Brazil, where both he and his wife were from. His brother, Cyro de Freitas Valle, was a Brazilian diplomat, and they later became estranged due to political differences.

Brugueras was a diplomat in Paris (1973–1974), then Ambassador to Lebanon (1974–1977), Panama (1977–1979) and Argentina, and later Deputy Minister of Foreign Affairs and Tourism. He directed the Cuban news agency Prensa Latina.

In 1979, Brugueras and his wife divorced due to political differences, and she and their two daughters returned to Cuba.

His daughter Tania Bruguera is an artist.
