= Art21 =

Non-profit organization in the USA

- Founded: 1997; 29 years ago
- Founder: Susan Sollins
- Type: Nonprofit organization
- Headquarters: New York City, United States
- Region served: Worldwide
- Products: Documentary films
- Services: Film production, public programs, educational resources
- Website: art21.org

Art21 is a US-based nonprofit organization founded in 1997 that produces documentary films about contemporary artists from across the globe. It produces three film series: Art in the Twenty-First Century, which originally aired on PBS, Extended Play, and New York Close Up. The main office is located in New York City. All Art21 films are available to stream for free online.

As stated on the company's website, the mission of Art21 is "to educate and expand access to contemporary art through the production of documentary films, resources, and public programs."

== Film Series ==
Art in the 21st Century is a series about contemporary artists that premiered in 2001. Originally airing on PBS, Art in the Twenty-First Century is the only series on United States television to focus exclusively on contemporary visual art and artists. "For making 'art' more knowable and familiar, yet more individualized, more distinctive, and more personal," Art21's Art in the Twenty-First Century received a Peabody Award in 2007.

Extended Play (formerly known as Exclusive) is a digital series that premiered in 2008. The series "provides unmediated, behind-the-scenes access to today’s leading artists."

New York Close Up is a digital series that launched in 2011. The series "focuses on artists in the first decade of their professional careers, discussing their work and lives in New York City".

== Education ==
Art21 provides free materials and programs to educators and students. Programs include Art21 Educators, a year-long intensive professional development program, and free teacher workshops offered throughout the year.

== Art in the Twenty-First Century ==
Each season is separated into thematic episodes, showcasing artists whose bodies of work fit that niche.

Season 1 (2001):

- Place – Introduction by artist Laurie Anderson. Featured artists are Richard Serra, Sally Mann, Margaret Kilgallen, Barry McGee, and Pepon Osorio.
- Spirituality – Introduction by Beryl Korot and S. Epatha Merkerson. Featured artists are Ann Hamilton, John Feodorov, Shahzia Sikander, and James Turrell.
- Identity – Introduction by comedian Steve Martin, and artist, William Wegman. Featured artists are Bruce Nauman, Kerry James Marshall, Maya Lin, and Louise Bourgeois.
- Consumption – Introduction by artist Barbara Kruger, and former professional tennis player John McEnroe. Featured artists are Michael Ray Charles, Matthew Barney, Andrea Zittel, and Mel Chin.

Season 2 (2003):

- Stories (directed by Charles Atlas) – Introduction by filmmaker John Waters . Featured artists are Kara Walker, Kiki Smith, Do-Ho Suh, and Trenton Doyle Hancock.
- Loss and Desire (directed by Charles Atlas) – Introduction by four-time Oscar-nominated actress Jane Anderson. Featured artists are Collier Schorr, Gabriel Orozco, and Janine Antoni.
- Humor (directed by Charles Atlas) – Introduction by comedian Margaret Cho. Featured artists are Eleanor Antin, Raymond Pettibon, Elizabeth Murray, and Walton Ford.
- Time (directed by Charles Atlas) – Introduction by dancer/choreographer Merce Cunningham. Featured artists are Martin Puryear, Paul Pfeiffer, Vija Celmins, and Tim Hawkinson.

Season 3 (2005):

- Power – Introduction by actor David Alan Grier. Featured artists are Cai Guo-Qiang, Laylah Ali, Krzysztof Wodiczko, Ida Applebroog, and Teresa Hubbard / Alexander Birchler.
- Memory – Introduction by actress Isabella Rossellini. Featured artists are Susan Rothenberg, Mike Kelley, Hiroshi Sugimoto, Josiah McElheny, and Teresa Hubbard / Alexander Birchler.
- Play – Introduction by basketball player Grant Hill. Featured artists are Jessica Stockholder, Oliver Herring, Arturo Herrera, Ellen Gallagher, and Teresa Hubbard / Alexander Birchler.
- Structures – Introduction by actor Sam Waterston. Featured artists are Matthew Ritchie, Fred Wilson, Richard Tuttle, Roni Horn, and Teresa Hubbard / Alexander Birchler.

Season 4 (2007):

- Romance – Featured artists are Laurie Simmons, Lari Pittman, Judy Pfaff, and Pierre Huyghe.
- Protest – Featured artists are Nancy Spero, An-My Lê, Alfredo Jaar, and Jenny Holzer.
- Ecology – Featured artists are Ursula von Rydingsvard, Iñigo Manglano-Ovalle, Robert Adams, and Mark Dion.
- Paradox – Featured artists are Mark Bradford, Catherine Sullivan, Robert Ryman, and Jennifer Allora and Guillermo Calzadilla.

Season 5 (2009):

- Compassion – Featured artists are William Kentridge, Doris Salcedo and Carrie Mae Weems.
- Fantasy – Featured artists are Cao Fei, Mary Heilmann, Jeff Koons, and Florian Maier-Aichen.
- Transformation – Featured artists are Paul McCarthy, Cindy Sherman, and Yinka Shonibare MBE.
- Systems – Featured artists are Julie Mehretu, John Baldessari, Kimsooja, and Allan McCollum.

Season 6 (2012):

- Change – Featured artists are Ai Weiwei, Catherine Opie, and El Anatsui.
- Boundaries – Featured artists are assume vivid astro focus, David Altmejd, Lynda Benglis, and Tabaimo.
- History – Featured artists are Glenn Ligon, Marina Abramović, and Mary Reid Kelley.
- Balance – Featured artists are Rackstraw Downes, Robert Mangold, and Sarah Sze.

Season 7 (2014):

- Investigation – Featured artists are Thomas Hirschhorn, Graciela Iturbide, and Leonardo Drew.
- Secrets – Featured artists are Elliott Hundley, Arlene Shechet, and Trevor Paglen.
- Legacy – Featured artists are Tania Bruguera, Abraham Cruzvillegas, and Wolfgang Laib.
- Fiction – Featured artists are Katharina Grosse, Joan Jonas, and Omer Fast.

Season 8 (2016):

- In May 2016 the schedule for an eighth season was announced. Air dates were to start in September of that year. Actress Claire Danes hosts each episode of the eighth season, each focusing on one of the four North American cities: Chicago, Los Angeles, Mexico City, and Vancouver.
- Chicago – Featured artists are Nick Cave (performance artist), Theaster Gates, Barbara Kasten, and Chris Ware.
- Mexico City – Featured artists are Natalia Almada, Minerva Cuevas, Damián Ortega, and Pedro Reyes.
- Los Angeles – Featured artists are Ed Arceneaux, Liz Larner, Tala Madani, and Diana Thater.
- Vancouver – Featured artists are Stan Douglas, Brian Jungen, Liz Magor, and Jeff Wall.

Season 9 (2018):

- Johannesburg – Featured artists are Robin Rhode, David Goldblatt, Zanele Muholi, and Nicholas Hlobo.
- Berlin – Featured artists are Olafur Eliasson, Nathalie Djurberg and Hans Berg, Susan Philipsz, and Hiwa K.
- San Francisco Bay Area – Featured artists are Stephanie Syjuco, Katy Grannan, Lynn Hershman Leeson, and Creative Growth Art Center.

Season 10 (2020):

- London – Featured artists are John Akomfrah, Phyllida Barlow, Anish Kapoor, and Christian Marclay.
- Beijing – Featured artists are Guan Xiao, Liu Xiaodong, Song Dong & Yin Xiuzhen, and Xu Bing.
- The Borderlands – Featured artists are Tanya Aguiñiga, Rafael Lozano-Hemmer, Richard Misrach, and Postcommodity.

Season 11 (2023):

- Everyday Icons – Featured artists are Amy Sherald, Daniel Lind-Ramos, Rose B. Simpson, and Alex Da Corte.
- Bodies of Knowledge – Featured artists are Tauba Auerbach, Guerrilla Girls, Hank Willis Thomas, and Anicka Yi.
- Friends & Strangers – Featured artists are Linda Goode Bryant, Miranda July, Christine Sun Kim, and Cannupa Hanska Luger.

Season 12 (2025):

- Between Worlds – Featured artists are Sophie Calle, Lubaina Himid, Tuan Andrew Nguyen, and Dyani White Hawk.
- Realms of the Real – Featured artists are Njideka Akunyili Crosby, Ragnar Kjartansson, Candice Lin, and Tomás Saraceno.
- Human Nature – Featured artists are Lenka Clayton, Josh Kline, Delcy Morelos, and Sin Wai Kin.

== Sources ==
- Official website
