= Ettore Spalletti =

Italian artist (1940–2019)

Ettore Spalletti (26 January 1940 – 11 October 2019) was an Italian artist. He exhibited at Documenta in 1982 and 1992 and represented Italy at the Venice Biennale in 1997. Spalletti was mostly known for his light blue monochrome paintings that he created on different surfaces and for his creative use of light. Spalletti lived and worked for all his life in his birthplace Cappelle sul Tavo in Abruzzo. He is considered part of the Arte Povera movement.

== Early life ==
Born on January 26, 1940, in Cappelle sul Tavo in the province of Pescara, he moved to Rome to study set design at the Accademia di Belle Arti di Roma.

== Career ==
Spalletti was recognized for his glowing, powdery surfaces and a restrained palette of blues, pinks, grays, and whites with gold leaf. His practice integrated painting and sculpture, achieving a balance among color, form, and architectural elements. Spalletti developed his works through a deliberate, meditative process, applying pigment in successive daily layers and sanding the surface to produce a soft, radiant finish. Instead of employing color as mere decoration, Spalletti utilized it to evoke atmosphere, temporal shifts, weather conditions, and emotional resonance. He was influenced by painters such as Masaccio and Piero della Francesca, as well as by the distinctive colors characteristic of the Abruzzo region, and the Apennine Mountains. His work is often compared to that of Jannis Kounellis, Anne Truitt, Mark Rothko, and Ellsworth Kelly. His early works date back to the 1960s, and over the decades he went on to exhibit his works at the most prestigious Italian and international venues. In 1996, he created permanent installations of particular emotional intensity for the Raymond Poincaré University Hospital in Garches, which were placed in the hospital morgue. Reading poetry was central to Ettore’s practice. He often read works by Sandro Penna, Giuseppe Ungaretti, Emily Dickinson, and others. For the Treccani, he designed the cover and endpapers of a limited edition of the encyclopedia in blue with gold embellishments. In Pescara, he designed La Fontana (The Fountain) in the square in front of the courthouse (Piazza Ettore Troilo, completed in 2004).

=== Awards ===
In 2017, he was awarded an honorary degree in Architecture from the D'Annunzio University of Chieti–Pescara of Pescara.

== Legacy ==
Artists, curators, and filmmakers influenced by Spalletti include Pappi Corsicato, Delcy Morelos, Amadour, and Hans Ulrich Obrist.

== Death ==
He died at the age of 79 in Spoltore, also in the province of Pescara and close to his hometown, on October 11, 2019, from complications related to pneumonia .

== Selected exhibitions ==
His works have been exhibited at Documenta in Kassel (1982, 1992), at the Venice Biennale (1982, 1993, 1995, 1997) where he presented a total of eight works, and in solo exhibitions in Paris at the Musée d'Art Moderne de Paris (1991), in New York (Osmosis, Solomon R. Guggenheim Museum, 1993, with Haim Steinbach), in Antwerp at the Museum van Hedendaagse Kunst Antwerpen (1995), in Strasbourg at (Salle des fêtes, Strasbourg Museum of Modern and Contemporary Art (1998, 1999), Naples at the Museo Nazionale di Capodimonte (1999), Leeds at the Henry Moore Foundation (2005). In 2014, the most comprehensive retrospective of the artist's work, entitled Un giorno così bianco, così bianco (Such a White Day, Such a White Day), was staged in a museum circuit formed by the MAXXI in Rome, the Turin Civic Gallery of Modern and Contemporary Art in Turin, and the Museo d'Arte Contemporanea Donnaregina in Naples. Also worth mentioning is the exhibition Giorgio Morandi. Ettore Spalletti. Dialogo di luce (Giorgio Morandi. Ettore Spalletti. Dialogue of Light) at the Galleria d'Arte Maggiore g.a.m. in Bologna.

- 1982: Documenta VII
- 1991: Musée d'Art Moderne de la Ville de Paris
- 1992: Documenta 9
- 1993: Solomon R. Guggenheim Museum (with Haim Steinbach)
- 1997: 47th Venice Biennale, he made collaborative works with Maurizio Cattelan and Joseph Kosuth
- 2009: Museum Kurhaus Kleve
- 2014: Jointed exhibition at MAXXI, Rome; Museo d'arte contemporanea Donnaregina, Naples; and Galleria civica d'arte moderna e contemporanea, Bergamo.
