= Francis McKee =

Irish writer and curator

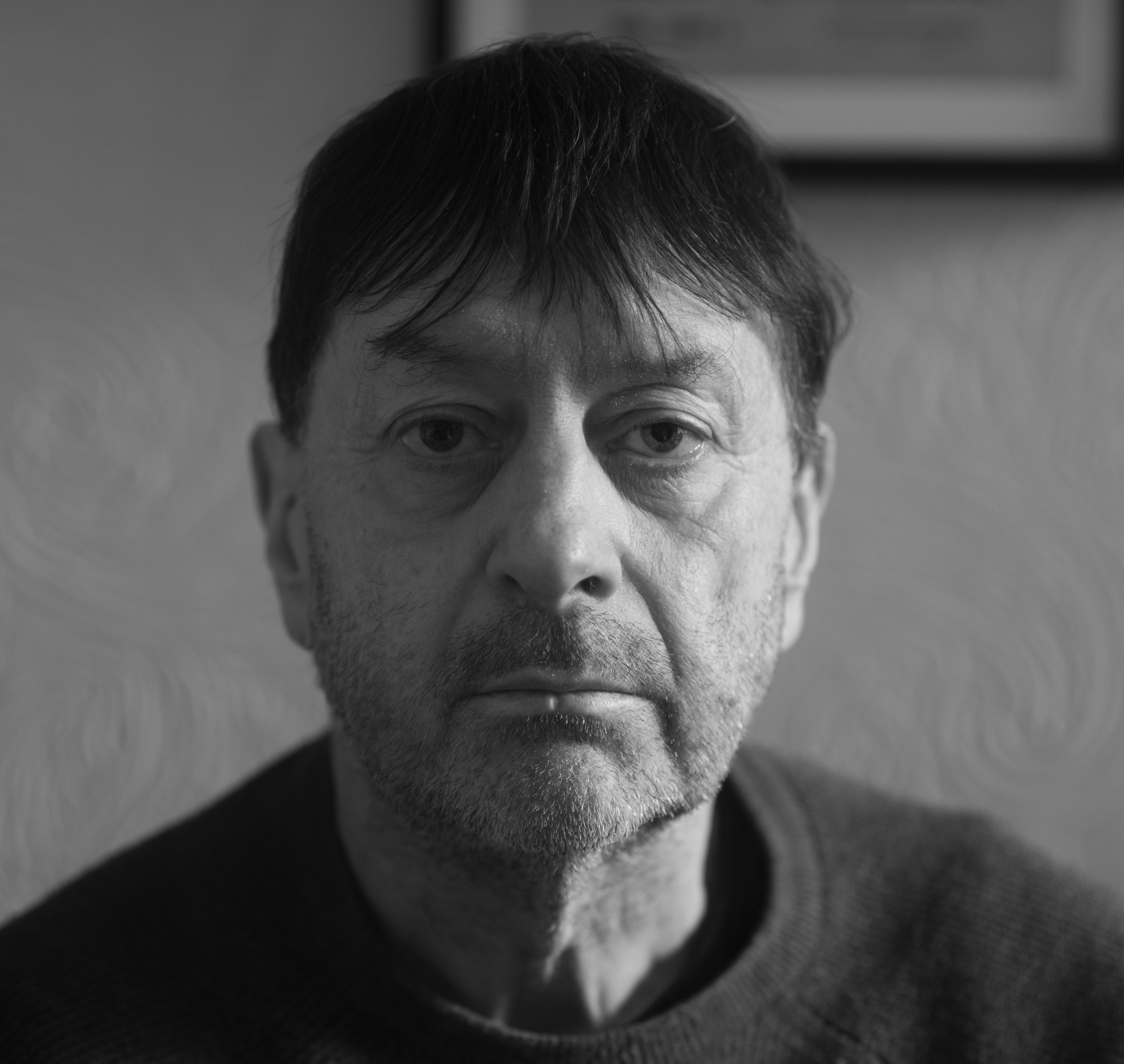
Francis McKee

Francis McKee (born 1960) is an Irish writer and curator working in Glasgow.

From 2005 to 2008 he was director of Glasgow International, and from 2006-2023 he was the director of the Centre for Contemporary Arts, Glasgow. He is a lecturer and research fellow at Glasgow School of Art, formerly working on the development of open source ideologies and now researching for a survey of Irish traditional music recordings.

He co-curated Zenomap, the Scottish participation at the Venice Biennale, with Kay Pallister in 2003.

Francis McKee has written extensively on the work of artists linked to Glasgow such as Christine Borland, Ross Sinclair, Douglas Gordon, Simon Starling and other international artists including Minerva Cuevas, Matthew Barney, Pipilotti Rist, Willie Doherty, Joao Penalva, Abraham Cruzvillegas, Beatriz Santiago Muñoz and co-published books on the Icelandic Love Corporation and Salla Tykkä in collaboration with NIFCA (Nordic Institute for Contemporary Art).

Francis McKee worked previously as a historian of medicine for the Wellcome Trust.

== Bibliography ==
- Dark Tales: Translations of Tales by Ester Krumbachova, translated by Francis McKee, Glasgow. (2019)
- Francis McKee, Even The Dead Rise Up (Book Works, 2017)
- Francis McKee, How to Know What is Really Happening, Edition in English and Edition in Arabic, (Sternberg, 2016)
- McKee, Francis (2018) 'The Rainbow Wrasse', In: The Constituent Museum: Constellations of Knowledge, Politics and Mediation, (Valiz with L'internationale, Amsterdam, pp. 14–26.
- Francis McKee, 'Universal Copernican Mumbles', in Beatriz Santiago Muñoz: A Universe of Fragile Mirrors, Miami: Pérez Art Museum 2016, pp. 197–205.
- Francis McKee, 'Starfish Prime', in After Berkeley: Objetif Exhibitions 2010-2012, Sternberg Press, Berlin, 2012.
- Francis McKee, “Minerva Cuevas: Anarchy in the Hive,” Afterall: A Journal of Art, Context and Enquiry 27 (2011): 54.
- Francis McKee, Selected Writings 1996-2007, Šiuolaikinio Meno Centras [ŠMC] & Contemporary Art Centre [CAC]. Vilnius, Lithuania. (2007)
- Philip by Mark Aerial Waller, Heman Chong, Cosmin Costinas, Rosemary Heather, Francis McKee, David Reinfurt, Steve Rushton and Leif Magne Tangen. Project Press. Dublin, (2007)
- Willie Doherty by Francis McKee, Yilmaz Dziewior, Matthias Muhling, and Willie Doherty (2007)
- Matthew Barney: Drawing Restraint 9 Matthew Barney, Hans-Ulrich Obrist and Francis McKee, (2006)
- Douglas Gordon's Vanity Of Allegory by Alison Gingeras, Francis Mckee, Douglas Gordon, and Nancy Spector (2005)
- Anna Gaskell: Half Life by Niall MacKenzie, Francis McKee, Matthew Drutt, and Anna Gaskell (2003)
- Show A Leg a catalogue by Francis McKee for Pipilotti Rist's exhibition of the same name at Tramway, Glasgow (2002)
- The Icelandic Love Corporation Edited by Francis McKee and Rebecca Gordon Nesbitt (2002)
- Salla Tykkä Edited by Rebecca Gordon Nesbitt and Francis McKee
- Neal Beggs by Francis McKee, Duncan McLaren, Kevin Kelly, and Dave Hewitt (2001)
- Kathy Prendergast: The End and the Beginning by Kathy Prendergast, Francis McKee. Irish Museum of Modern Art (2000)
- Luminous by Francis McKee (2000)
- Mariele Neudecker by Maite Lores, Francis McKee, Eszther Barbarczy, and Clare Stent (1999)
- Douglas Gordon: Kidnapping by Jan Debbaut, Francis McKee, Douglas Gordon, and Marente Bloemheuvel (1998)
- The House in the Woods Centre for Contemporary Art. (1998)
- Deep Blue by Francis McKee (1997)
- Institute of Cultural Anxiety: Works from the Collection by Jeremy Millar and Francis McKee (1996)
- The Paracelsian Kitchen by Francis McKee in Paracelsus: The Man and His Reputation, His Ideas and Their Transformation, ed. by Ole Peter Grell, Brill 1998.
- 'An anatomy of power: the early works of Bernard Mandeville. PhD Thesis, 1991, University of Glasgow.
