= Abraham Cruzvillegas =

Mexican visual artist

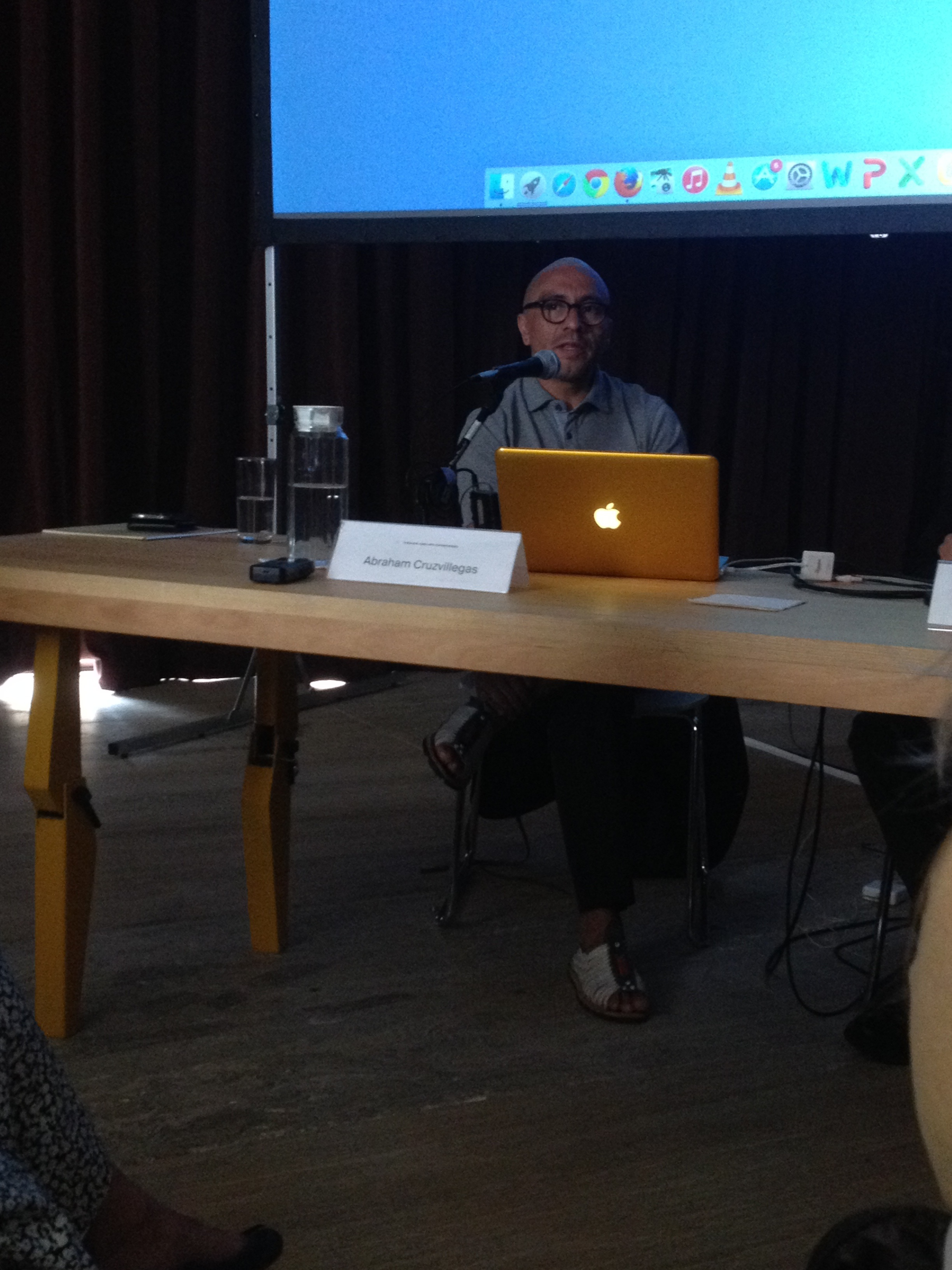
- Born: Abraham Cruzvillegas; 1968 (age 57–58); Mexico City, Mexico
- Known for: Sculpture, Video art, Installation, Painting

Abraham Cruzvillegas (born 1968) is a Mexican visual artist. He is best known for his work with found objects, and particularly his ongoing "autoconstrucción" project.

== Biography ==
Cruzvillegas grew up in Ajusco, a district in the south of Mexico City. He studied Philosophy and Art at the National Autonomous University of Mexico (UNAM). He later became a professor and went on to teach Art History and Theory at UNAM.

As a sculptor and writer, Cruzvillegas began as a central participant in a new wave of conceptual art in Mexico City during the 1980s and 90s. Along with Gabriel Orozco, Damian Ortega, Dr Lakra, and Minerva Cuevas, Cruzvillegas was considered part of a new movement in Latin American art (which has been compared to the YBA boom in Britain in the 1980s. or the Modernist movement of the 1920s). Orozco has been proposed as one of the "dominant influence(s)" on his work.

Together with Lakra, Orozco and Gabriel Kuri he participated in "Friday Workshops" ("Taller de los Viernes") in the 1980s, a weekly meeting in which the artists met and collaborated. As Cruzvillegas explained in the exhibition catalogue for 'Escultura Social: A New Generation of Art from Mexico City (2007): "We learned together to discuss, criticise, and transform our work individually, with no programmes, marks, exams, diplomas or reprisals. We did not intend to become known, prepare for a show, go against the grain, make our presence felt as a group, or even make work … this was my education". This then developed into the artist-run space "Temistocles 44" in the 1990s, founded by Eduardo Abaroa and Cruzvillegas. He lives and works in Paris where he teaches sculpture at Ecole des Beaux-Arts since 2018.

His work is held in a number of collections, including Tate Modern, LACMA and MoMA.

== Works and exhibitions ==
=== autoconstrucción ===
From 2007 onwards, Cruzvillegas has produced a series of works exploring what he calls autoconstrucción, or self-construction. As described by Chris Sharp in Art Review,

"autoconstrucción has been able to manifest in [...] many guises, places and modes: from small autonomous sculptures to large sculptural-cum-architectural installations; from mobile musical collaborations to an hourlong film, even a play. Autoconstrucción is multiplicity incarnate. Indeed, the term could be said to designate more of a spirit and an ethic than, say, a theory-driven aesthetic."

Autoconstrucción is in part inspired by his hometown of Ajusco, a neighbourhood that was mostly built by collective effort, use of accessible materials at hand, and improvisation. Christina Catherine Martinez stated in the Los Angeles Times in 2022, "Play is the substrate of autoconstrucción and its driving force, even as Cruzvillegas alternately breaks up and buttresses the idea with a catholic range of historical and artistic touchpoints, interests and memories."

Cruzvillegas himself stated in Art:21, "Sometimes, I just play with the materials, finding combinations, taking whatever is at hand [...] things, they speak, [and] I try to find a balance among them". Autoconstrucción, writes art historian Robin Greeley, is "a sculptural practice of dynamic contingency derived from the ad hoc building procedures common in squatter settlements on the outskirts of megacities. [...] Cruzvillegas works with found materials in a process of inventive appropriation."

From 2012, this project was accompanied by works around the theme of "autodestrucción", Cruzvillegas explained that through the autodestrucción works he "wanted to show how "Internationalism" or "Style" is something that is to be appropriated, customized, modified, adapted and even destroyed, according to specific, local, individual, subjective needs." From May to June 2018, kurimanzutto new york hosted an Autocontusión installation. It included new pieces, such as a mural inspired by Manhattan.

=== Empty Lot ===
In 2015, Cruzvillegas produced the Tate Modern Turbine Hall commission; his work, 'Empty Lot' was on display between 13 October 2015 and 3 April 2016. The work consists of 240 wooden triangular plots bordered with wooden frames, filled with 23 tonnes of soil collected from different parks and gardens across London (including Hackney Marshes, Peckham Rye, the Horniman Museum and Buckingham Palace). The entire work is raised on two large stepped, triangular scaffolded platforms, overlooked by growing light, and interspersed with smaller sculptural works. In an interview with The Independent he stated,

"the history of mankind is based on movement, transformation, hope [but] owning a piece of land that is yours and for your family is the main hope of everybody – having a shelter, having a piece of land. This idea of hope is one that I’m dealing with in this work for the Turbine Hall."

In her review for the Financial Times, Rachel Spence compared the work's "tidy blank triangles" to El Lissitzky and the work generally to Walter De Maria's New York Earth Room stating,

"The result is a work of art which works on more levels than the Shard: as process, as performance, as politics and as spectacle. Cruzvillegas says he hopes it will be somewhere "that something can grow out of nothing". Like a green-fingered Beckett, his less-is-more philosophy makes him a seer for our times."

Writing for The Daily Telegraph, Mark Hudson noted the influence of "Buckminster Fuller's geodesic domes and the grid-structured gardens of the Aztecs" and stated, "As a piece of gigantic sculpture, Empty Lot is one of the more dynamic and exciting of the Turbine Hall commissions. It feels suspended like a geometric island, perfectly poised in the immense space." Jonathan Jones, writing in The Guardian, called it "lazy and complacent, as if unbothered by the challenge, uninterested in winning an audience", an artwork with "no aesthetic power and precious little to think about", selecting it as his "worst" installation in the Turbine Hall series.

=== The Water Trilogy ===
This series of installations were shown in Galerie Chantal Crousel in Paris (2017), the Hermès Foundation in Tokyo (2017), and the Museum Boijmans Van Beuningen in Rotterdam (2017 - 2018).

He stated, "I had invitations to make projects in those cities. Then, I found a common thread with a link to a subjective circumstance happening at the time in the neighborhood where I was born and grew up in Mexico City — water scarcity [...] For me, constructing dams, expanding land overseas, or just creating political figures from left and right banks became material for a free, autonomous art project, using traditional music from the Huasteca region in Mexico. Three new lyrics were written as a starting point, addressing environmental, political, social, historical, economic, and aesthetic issues."

=== Other works and exhibitions ===
His works have been shown throughout America, Europe and Mexico. Elements of the Autoconstrucción project were shown (amongst others) at Tate Modern in March 2012, in the Museum of Modern Art in Oxford in 2011, at the Walker Art Center in 2013, and at the Haus der Kunst, Munich in 2014. His work is held in a number of collections, including Tate Modern, London and MoMA, New York. Cruzvillegas has shown his work in single and group exhibitions in a number of galleries across Europe, South America and the United States. In 1994, his work was shown in the Fifth Havana Biennial; in 2002 in the XXV São Paulo Biennial; in 2003 in the Fiftieth Venice Biennale; in 2005 in the 1st Torino Triennale; in 2008 in the Bienal de Cali, in Colombia; in the Tenth Havana Biennial, and the Seventh Bienal do Mercosul in Portoalegre. His work has been shown at the New Museum, New York City, at Tate Modern in London and at Aishti Foundation as part of the Trick Brain Exhibition in Lebanon. Cruzvillegas participated in ROUNDTABLE: The 9th Gwangju Biennale, which took place September to November 2012 in Gwangju, Korea.

In August 2012, it was announced that Cruzvillegas had won the Fifth Annual Yanghyun Prize In 2014, he was the subject of a joint exhibition at both the Colección Júmex and the Amparo Museum.

In April 2018, Cruzvillegas created a site-specific installation at the Kitchen, New York made out of debris collected in the streets of Chelsea, housing a series of performances combining theatre, dance and aerial acrobatics. The work incorporated instruments from different regions of Mexico like ocarinas, the jaw bones of donkeys and seashells.

In 2020–2021, Cruzvillegas curated a garden featuring more than 1,000 plants of 27 different species for a work called "Agua Dulce" at Collins Park outside of The Bass in Miami Beach; as part of the work, performers mimicked the song of birds and hum of insects.

In 2022, Cruzvillegas exhibited works entitled 'Tres Sonetas' at Regen Projects in Los Angeles, which "gravitate[d] around the rhythm and the structure of a poem by Concha Urquiza" of the same name.

In 2023, he gave the Rouse Visiting Artist Lecture at Harvard University Graduate School of Design, entitled: "Centring: A Definitely Unfinished and Temporary Structure for Art Making".

The exhibition Every Sound Is a Shape of Time on view at the Pérez Art Museum Miami in 2024, exhibited the works of seventeen artists in the museum's collection, including a piece by Abraham Cruzvillegas. The show gathered an intergenerational and international group working on a myriad artistic languages.

== Reception and influences ==
For the 2002 São Paulo Biennial, Cruzvillegas wrote: "However art makes itself evident, it shall remain, above all, raw source material in all its natural, unstable, physical, chaotic and crystalline states: solid, liquid, colloidal and gaseous. It is the joy of energy." Reviewing Cruzvillegas' 2003 show for The New York Times, Holland Cotter wrote, "In all Mr. Cruzvillegas's work, little is stated but much is said".

In a monograph on Cruzvillegas' work in Frieze magazine in 2006, Tom Morton discusses an untitled work from 1993 which recalls Marcel Duchamp's 1913 Bicycle Wheel, though the spokes have been replaced "by a circular panel on which his father, now an academic, once painted a bouquet of red carnations". Tom Morton relates, "by bringing the work of these two men together Cruzvillegas not only expands the notion of 'influence' so that it might include the micro-stuff of specific domestic context alongside the macro-stuff of art history, but also casts into doubt the purity of the ready-made – which is to say, its inconsequentiality, its mute object-hood."

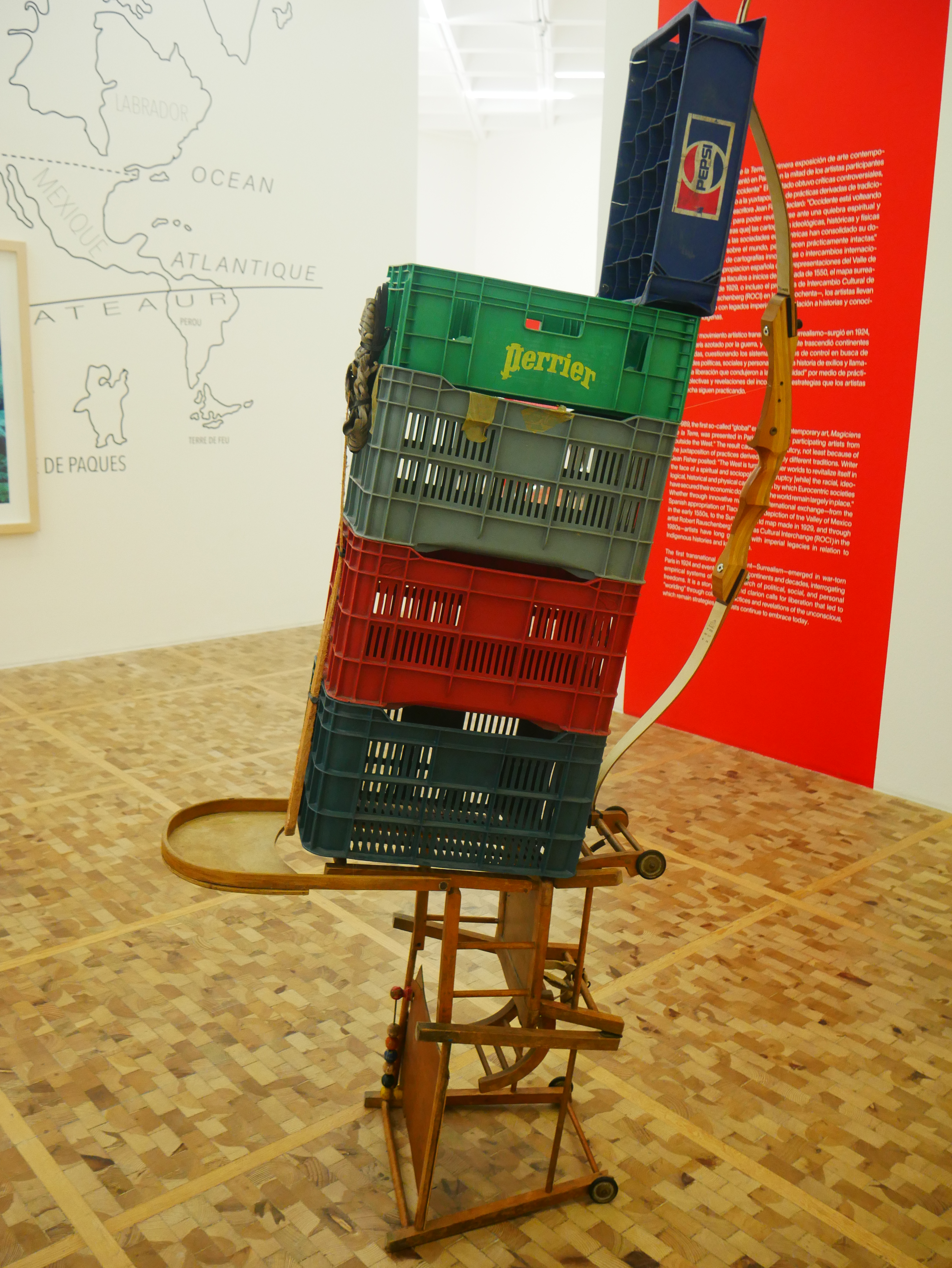
Instalación de Abraham Cruzvillegas en el Museo Tamayo 01

Chris Sharp, in the January 2013 issue of Art Review, states: "his works are often united by an identifiable formal sensibility, whose predominantly found-object or poor-material aesthetic influence is as indebted to Robert Rauschenberg, David Hammons and Jimmie Durham as it is to Gabriel Orozco. The difference between them and Cruzvillegas, however, is the highly personal, specific and inherently protean programme to which his cultural and material universe adheres."

Niamh Coglan, in Aesthetica Magazine in February 2013, notes: "Works such as Aeropuerto Alterno (2002), A.C. Mobile (2008) or Sin Título / Untitled (1999), which directly references Duchamp's Bicycle Wheel (1913), exhibit a strong Duchampian element, not just for their aesthetic form but for appropriative elements", and goes on to state "Cruzvillegas does with material what Marcel Broodthaers and René Magritte did with words and linguistics".

Gareth Harris, in The Art Newspaper in January 2014, declared: "With his vast range of dynamic assemblage sculptures meticulously built from found objects, the Mexican artist Abraham Cruzvillegas has been dubbed the 21st-century equivalent of Marcel Duchamp."

In 2014, Cruzvillegas was profiled (with Tania Bruguera and Wolfgang Laib) in the third episode ("Legacy") of the seventh season of the PBS contemporary art programme Art:21 - Art in the 21st Century.

Cruzvillegas has said of Gustav Metzger "[his] position as an activist and artist has been a big inspiration for me".

In an interview with the Los Angeles Times, Cruzvillegas' work was compared "to the bronzes of Catalan sculptor Julio Gonzalez, who combined forms both organic and abstract, to the entropic cage forms of British artist Anthony Caro, and to the arrangements of wires, covered in hair, by U.S. artist David Hammons", to which Cruzvillegas replied, "these guys are super important to me as artists [...] I use that language."

== Residencies ==
- 2005 Residency at Atelier Calder, Saché, France
- 2006 Altadis Contemporary Art Prize, France-Spain
- 2006-2007 Residency at Brownstone Foundation, Paris
- 2007 Residency at Civitella Ranieri Foundation, Umbria, Italy
- 2008 Artist Research Fellowship, Smithsonian Institution, Washington DC
- 2008 Residency at Cove Park/CCA, Glasgow, Scotland
- 2009 Residency at the Wattis Institute/CCA, San Francisco
- 2010-2011 DAAD Artists in Berlin Residency Program

== Personal life ==
Cruzvillegas is married to Alejandra Carrillo, a lawyer specialising in migratory issues who has worked for the UN High Commissioner for Refugees in Mexico.

== Bibliography ==
A list of recent publications include:

- Textos sobre la obra de Abraham Cruzvillegas, Jaime Soler Frost, ed. (Secretaría de Cultura, México, 2016)
- The Logic of Disorder: The Art and Writings of Abraham Cruzvillegas, Robin Adele Greeley, ed., (Harvard University Press, 2016)
- "El corazón de las tinieblas" (Heart of Darkness), Joseph Conrad, illustrated by Cruzvillegas (Sexto Piso, 2014)
- "Abraham Cruzvillegas: The Autoconstruccion Suites", Patricia Falguieres (Walker Art Center, 2013)
- "100 Notes - 100 Thoughts Documenta 13", Abraham Cruzvillegas (Hatje Cantz, 2012)
- "Autoconstruccion: The Book", Clara Kim, Jimmie Durham, Mark Godfrey, Ryan Inouye and Abraham Cruzvillegas (Redcat, 2009)
- "Abraham Cruzvillegas: Autoconstruccion", Francis McKee and Abraham Cruzvillegas (CCA, 2008)
- Robin Adele Greeley, "The Logic of Disorder: The Sculptural Materialism of Abraham Cruzvillegas," October 151 (Winter 2015): 78–107
- "Los Dos Amigos", Abraham Cruzvillegas and Dr Lakra (Turner/UNAM, 2007)
- Abraham Cruzvillegas. Challenge of Failure and Confusion of Possibility, Sunjung Kim, ed., (Seoul: Samuso/Huynsil Publishing Co., 2016)
- Abraham Cruzvillegas: Autodestrucción4: Demolición (London: Thomas Dane Gallery, 2014)
