= Kurimanzutto =

Art gallery in Mexico City

Coordinates: 19.4114°N 99.1876°W

Kurimanzutto is an art gallery located in Mexico City and New York City specializing in contemporary art that represents 33 international artists. It was founded in 1999 by Mónica Manzutto and José Kuri as a gallery without a fixed space. In 2006 it occupied a warehouse in the Colonia Condesa which served as a project space and workshop. In 2008 it opened its main gallery space in Mexico City in the San Miguel Chapultepec neighborhood and in 2018 it opened a project space in New York City.

== History ==
Kurimanzutto was conceived by Gabriel Orozco, José Kuri and Mónica Manzutto in 1999 and was initially founded as a nomadic enterprise.

Economía de Mercado, the first exhibition by Kurimanzutto was held at the Mercado de Medellín market place in Mexico City at a rented fruit stall on August 21, 1999. The works had been made by a group of artists including Abraham Cruzvillegas, Damián Ortega, Daniel Guzmán, Eduardo Abaroa, Fernando Ortega, Gabriel Kuri, Gabriel Orozco, Minerva Cuevas, Sofía Táboas and Rirkrit Tiravanija; with materials found in the market and were sold for prices similar to those of general produce. The exhibition only lasted one day.

From 2000 to 2003 Kurimanzutto produced more that twelve different projects in distinct locations. In 2002, Jonathan Hernández chose the International Airport in Mexico City to show Traveling without moving. Minerva Cuevas presented Dodgem at a local popular fair, the project consisted in a bumper car installation in which all the cars were decorated with a petrol brand company's logo. Other places where exhibitions were held were parking lots, trailer containers, restaurants and Mónica and José's apartment. Los Manantiales restaurant in Xochimilco hosted Elephant Juice (Sexo entre amigos), in 2003, a proposal by Damián Ortega which consisted in a labyrinth made of tubular structures divided for each participating artist to intervene. The space was designed by the architect Mauricio Rocha and it contained drawings, photographs, painting, installations, videos, sculptures and even a pole dancer performance act.

In 2003, Gabriel Orozco was invited as guest curator for the 50th Venice Biennale. The artist invited Damián Ortega, Daniel Guzmán, Abraham Cruzvillegas, Fernando Ortega, Jean-Luc Moulène and Jimmie Durham, to complete a series of conditions for the creation of the works that would be exhibited: they would not be able to present photographs, videos or drawings, they couldn't hang thinks on the walls nor use pedestals or vitrines. The creative exercise under these conditions was titled Everyday Altered.

In 2025, Kurimanzutto invited Soundwalk Collective and Patti Smith to present their work Correspondences at their New York Gallery, the first gallery presentation of this collective body of work.

== Locations ==
In 2008 an ancient lumberyard was transformed into the gallery's main exhibition space in Mexico City. The building dating from the 1950s was refurbished and redesigned by the architect Alberto Kalach. The Gallery is located at Gobernador Rafael Rebollar 94 in the San Miguel Chapultepec neighborhood of Mexico City.

In 2018, Kurimanzutto opened a project space at 22 East 65th Street, on Manhattan’s Upper East Side. In 2024, Kurimanzutto joined forces with galleries Bortolami, James Cohan Gallery, Kaufmann Repetto, Anton Kern and Andrew Kreps to buy the 78,000-square-foot Ockawamick School and its surrounding 22 acres in Claverack, New York.

== Artists ==
Kurimanzutto represents several living artists, including:

- Minerva Cuevas
- Dr Lakra
- Sarah Lucas
- Oscar Murillo (since 2022)
- Gabriel Orozco
- Roman Ondak
- Adrián Villar Rojas
- Danh Vo
- Haegue Yang

== Reception ==
In 2001 Flash Art Magazine considered Kurimanzutto between the 100 most influential galleries in the world.

In 2018 Art Review magazine mentions the gallery as one of the most important in Mexico and their founders are positioned in the 34th position of the 100 most influential figures in the contemporary art world.
