= Manuel Rocha Iturbide =

Mexican composer and sound artist

Manuel Rocha Iturbide (born 1963 in Mexico City) is a Mexican composer and sound artist.

== Biography ==
Manuel Rocha Iturbide was born in 1963 in Mexico City. He started his musical studies when he was 13 years old.

In 1983, after studying musical pedagogy in Lyon, France for one year, he decided to start a career as composer at the Escuela Nacional de Musica of the University of Mexico. The extremely academic and traditional studies of that institution led him to explore different creative ways beyond instrumental music, so he practiced photography at "Taller de los Lunes", a workshop organized by Mexican digital photography pioneer Pedro Meyer.

In 1989 he realized his first sound sculpture at the milestone exhibition "14 artists around Joseph Beuyce" in Mexico City, with important Mexican artists from his generation such as Gabriel Orozco.

In 1989, Rocha Iturbide traveled to Mills College in the US, to pursue an MFA in electronic music. There, he composed "Frost Clear", a piece for amplified refrigerator, double bass and electronic sounds which he has played through the years at different important festivals such as the San Francisco Electronic Music Festival in 2006.

In 1991, Rocha Iturbide traveled to France where he studied and worked as a researcher at IRCAM, and where he pursued his doctoral thesis on granular synthesis and quantum mechanics in relation to sound from 1992 to 1999. In these years, he worked with Curtis Roads and Barry Truax, two of the most important pioneers on granular synthesis computer music techniques.

In 1999 the president of the jury of his doctoral thesis defense was Jean Claude Risset. The name of his thesis was "The granular synthesis techniques". The influence of this research can be seen in different electroacoustic music works of this composer: "Transiciones de Fase" for brass quintet and electronic sounds (1994), "Moin Mor" for electronic sounds (1995), and "SL-9" for electronic sounds (1994).

At his return to Mexico after seven years abroad, Rocha Iturbide devoted himself to sound art, being one of its pioneers and biggest promoters. His first important work at that stage was "Ping-Roll", an aluminum ping pong table with speakers underneath, where over 60 ping pong balls reacted to the continuous and discontinuous sounds produced by sine waves and bouncing sounds, jumping and then rolling. This sound sculpture was exhibited at the Sidney Biennale in 1998.

In 2000, during his stay in Japan, thanks to the Japan Foundation Scholarship, his work was exhibited at the SURGE gallery and at the Kyoto Art Center, also with electronic music, photography and video.

In the year 2002 in Venezuela an exhibition of sculptures and sound installations in Fine Arts of Caracas was held, as well as an individual exhibition in the AVATAR art space in Quebec. Canada. He taught courses in Art History and Aesthetics (1987–88), computer music at the University of Paris VIII (1995–96), interactive art at the Multimedia Center at the CNA (1997-1998) and sound art at the Esmeralda.

Iturbide's work has been devoted to sound art and electroacoustic music, and he has had important commissions in both fields. In 2006 he received a commission from the Arditti Quartet, the composition "Tetraktis" for string quartet and 4 digital tracks, and in 2010 a commission from the Japanese piano player Aki Takahashi for piano and electronic sounds ("Ashimakase").

Rocha Iturbide has also been the curator of the international sound art festival in Mexico. As a researcher, he has written articles about the history of electroacoustic music and sound art in Mexico, and about the aesthetics of sound art expressions, such as sound installations and sound sculptures.

== Selected electroacoustic compositions ==
- Avidya for tape. 1989.
- Atl for tape. 1990.
- Semi No Koe for flute and tape. 2001.
- Cantos Rituales for tape. 2003.
- S-36-A for 19 digital tracks. 2004. Commission from the "Oasis sonoro" project.
- Purusha-Prakrti for tape. 2005. Commission from the IMEB electroacoustic music institute in Bourges, France.
- Light and Dust for oboe and tape. 2006.
- Tetraktys for string quartet and 4 digital tracks. 2007. Commission from the Arditti String Quartet.
- Ashimakase for piano and electronic sounds. 2010. Commission from Japanese pianist Aki Takahashi.

== Selected sound art works ==
- (+ * -) = - sound sculpture. 1989.
- Ligne d'abandon conceptual sound piece in collaboration with Gabriel Orozco. 1994.
- Mechanisms for the absolution of waste sound installation. 1997.
- Rebicyling sound Installation. 2000.
- El eco esta en todas partes Sound installation. 2003. Commission for the art collection JUMEX.
- I play the drums with frequency sound installation. 2007.
- Sónca Tal sound sculpture. 2010.

== Selected exhibitions ==
Iturbide has had solo exhibitions in ARCO 99 in Madrid, Spain; Surge Gallery in Tokyo, Japan; and Avatar in Quebec, Canada, in 2002.

His work has appeared in collective exhibitions in Chantal Crousel Gallery (Paris, France, 1994); Lines of Loss in Artists Space (New York, 1997); Sydney International Biennial (Australia, 1998); Project Rooms of the ARCO Fair (1999); Nothing in Roseeum (Malmo, Switzerland, 2001); AVATAR (Quebec, Canada, 2002); Puddles Artists-Initiative links (Tokyo Japan, 2003); Jumex Collection (Mexico City, 2003 and 2006); Museum of Fine Arts in Caracas (Venezuela, 2003); Koldo de Mixtelena (San Sebastian, Spain, 2007); International Forum of Cultures (Monterrey, 2007); Eco Museum (Mexico City, 2008); McBean Gallery (San Francisco, California, 2010); Xng Dong Chaeng Space for Contemporary Art (Pekin, China, 2011); MUAC (Mexico City, 2012); Le Laboratoire Gallery (Mexico City, 2012 and 2014, with respective curatorships of Ariadna Ramonetti and Michel Blancsubé); Prada Foundation (Venice, 2014); and Zona MACO 2013 (Prize 1800 José Cuervo), 2014 and 2015.

- Audio-Elf. Score Cologne Festival, 11 June – 9 July 2006.
- Corte de Pelo
- La instalación sonora
- Off beat Japan. Zone Zero, Japan, August 2001 – April 2002.
- Rebicycling. Gallery Surge, Tokyo, 21 November – 2 December 2000.
- Sound Oasis Project in Mexico City

== Awards ==
He was awarded the FONCA Young Creators scholarship in 1993-94, in 1996 and 1997. He was awarded two prizes at the Luigi Russolo International Competition in Italy and two honorable mentions at the International Music Competition

Electroacústica de Bourges, as well as the first prize of the festival of the year 2006, also obtained the BANFF scholarship in 1998, and a special mention in the FEMSA Biennial in the city of Monterrey.
