= Lothar Baumgarten =

German artist (1944–2018)

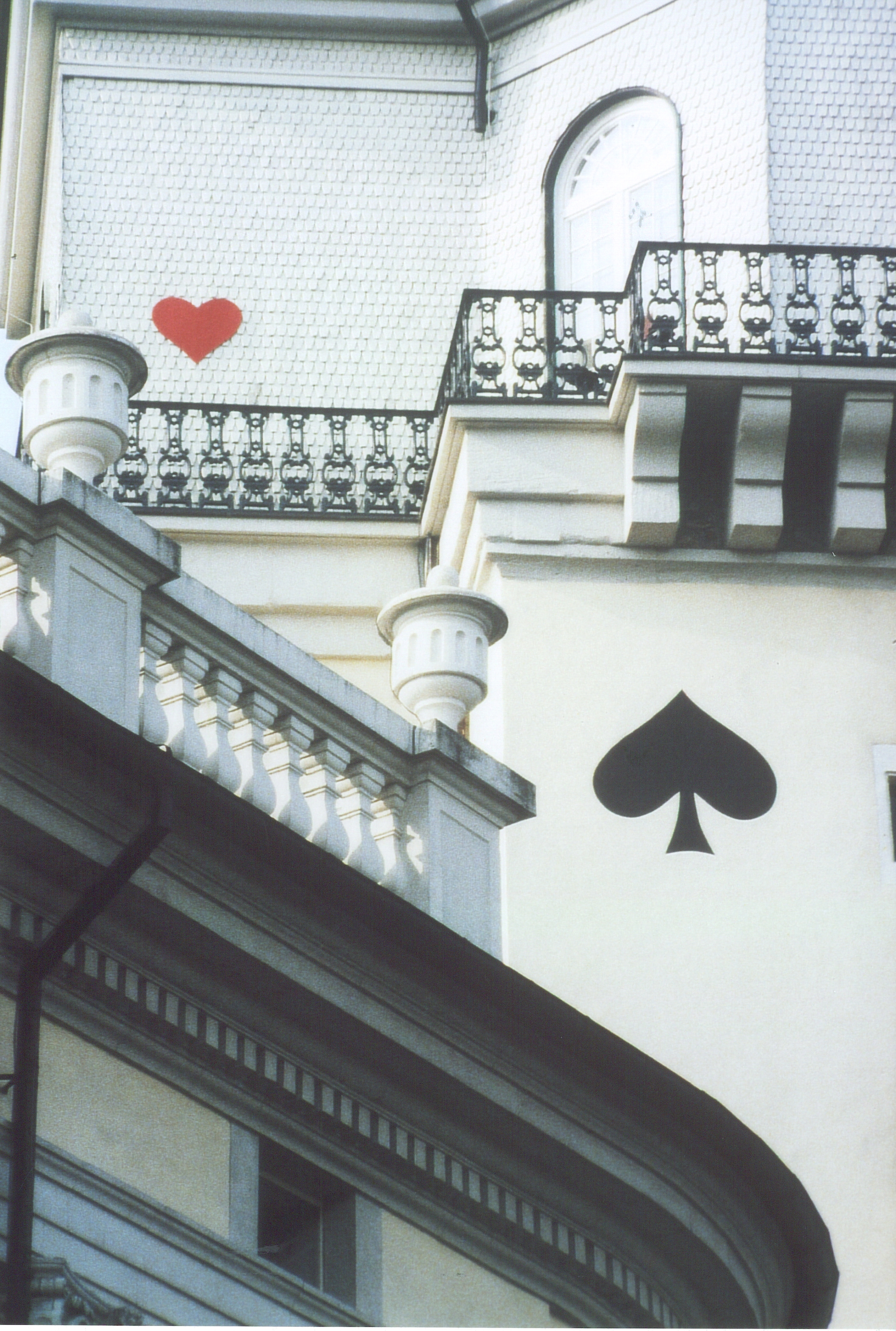
Lothar Baumgarten, detail of Entenschlaf, Documenta IX 1992. Kassel, Germany

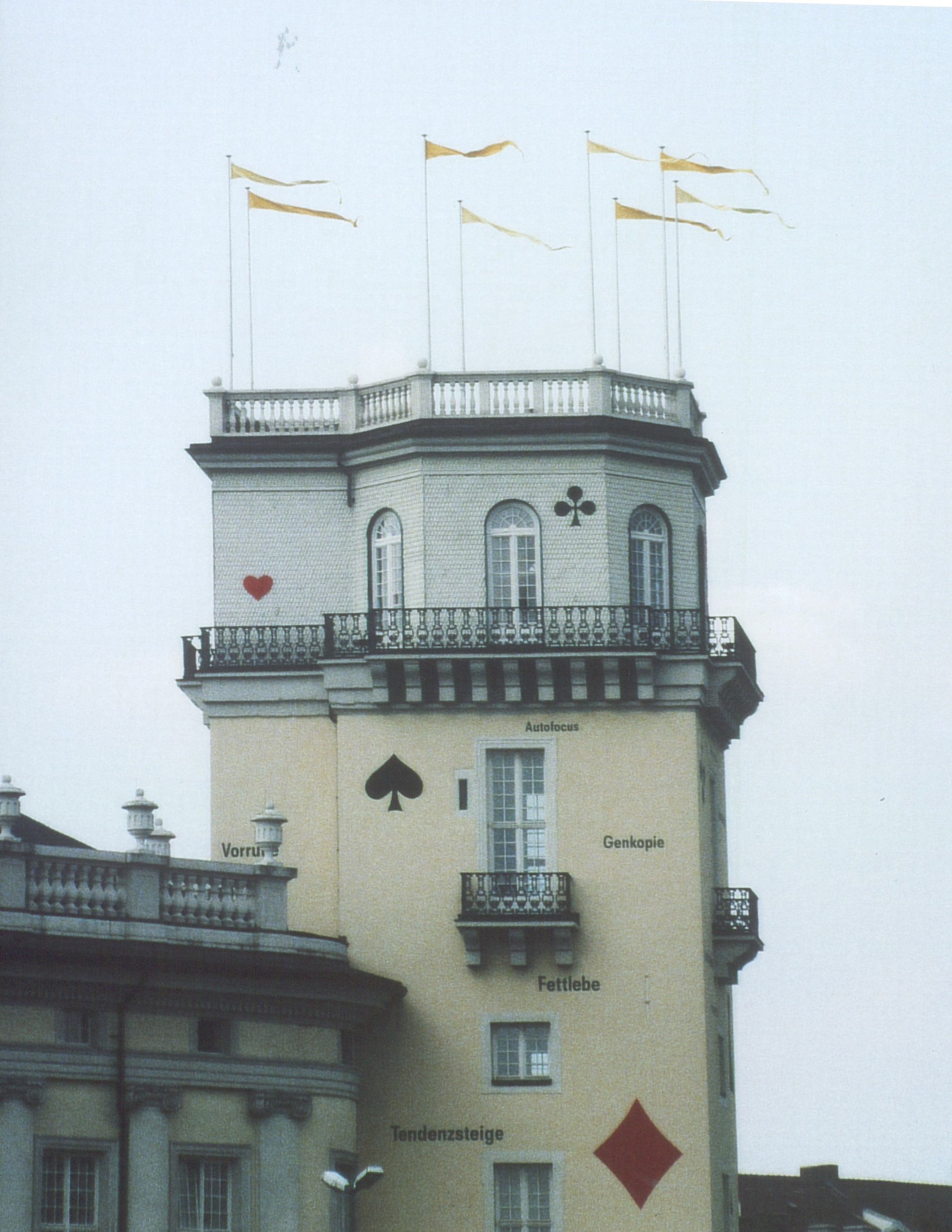
Lothar Baumgarten, Entenschlaf, Documenta IX 1992. Kassel, Germany

Lothar Baumgarten (5 October 1944 – 2 December 2018) was a German conceptual artist, based in New York and Berlin. His work includes installation and also film.

== Early life and education ==
Born 1944 in Rheinsberg, Germany, Baumgarten attended the Staatliche Akademie der bildenden Künste, Karlsruhe (1968), and the Kunstakademie Düsseldorf (1969–71), where he studied for a year under Joseph Beuys.

== Work ==
Baumgarten's body of work included ephemeral sculptures, photographic work, slide projection pieces, 16 mm film works, recordings, drawings, prints, books, short stories, as well as site-specific works and wall drawings and architecture related interventions.

Between 1968 and 1970, Baumgarten undertook a systematic photographic study of how several European ethnographic museums frame the viewer's perception through the manner in which their objects are displayed. The eighty Ektachromes that comprise Baumgarten's slide projection Unsettled Objects (1968–69) show artifacts at the Pitt Rivers Museum in Oxford, displayed much as they were when it was opened to the public in 1874.

Between 1977 and 1986 Baumgarten visited Brazil and Venezuela. During an eighteen-month period between 1978 and 1980, the artist lived among the Yãnomãmi people of Kashorawë-their and Nyapetawë-their in the upper Orinoco region. There were about 85 people in this particular community, which at that time had had relatively little contact with the outside world. Baumgarten's visits resulted in works such as Terra Incognita (1969–84), a three-dimensional diagram of the frontier between the two countries. Made between 1973 and 1977, The Origin of the Night: Amazon Cosmos is a 98-minutes film on the Brazilian rain forest and the creation stories of the Tupi Indians; Baumgarten took the film's story from Claude Lévi-Strauss's book From Honey to Ashes. A later work, El Dorado – Gran Sabana (1977–85), juxtaposes photographs of the rich landscape of the La Gran Sabana region, the site of the legendary El Dorado, which Baumgarten took in 1977 with the names of heavy metals and minerals mined in the area during the 1980s; the names of indigenous animals being exterminated by the mining process are linked with the metals and minerals. River-Crossing, Kashorawetheri (1978), a suite of 15 black-and-white photographs, follows a group of Yãnomãmi on an arduous journey through a forest and across a waterway. Fragmento Brasil (1977-2005), a synchronized multi-projection piece without sound, is made up of paired sequences of 648 images from three sources: details from Albert Eckhout's mid-17th-century paintings of Brazilian birds set in idealized landscapes of European provenance; the abstract drawings of Yãnomãmi people from Venezuela and Brazil, 1978–80; and in conjunction, black & white landscape photographs of the Rio Caroni, Rio Uraricoera and Rio Branco regions in Venezuela and Brazil taken by the artist on a five-month walk in 1977. When he represented Germany at the 1984 Venice Biennale, his work Señores Naturales consisted of the names of Amazonian peoples engraved on a marble floor and filled with resin. At documenta X in Kassel (1997), Baumgarten exhibited the archives of his stay with the Yãnomãmi.

In Accès aux quais (tableaux parisiens) (1985–6), Baumgarten displayed a Metro line map, the names of the stations altered to refer to French colonial activity. In 1976 and 1989, he spent six months traveling the United States by rail and residing on several Indian reservations. A ceiling piece made for the Carnegie Museum of Art in 1988 featured hand-painted letters from the Cherokee alphabet. For Carbon (1989), an installation composed chiefly of bars of color and typographically crisp words, he mapped two overlapping histories around the gallery walls: The network of railroads integral to the settling of the American West and the homes of the indigenous tribes who were displaced, imprisoned or eradicated. What remains are their names, which live on in the network of the railroads: Cheyenne and Northern Railway, Apache Railway, Keokuk Junction Railway or Monongahela Railway. Other names continue to exist only as geographic designations: Potomac River, Coconino County, and Chemehuevi Mountains. The Museum of Contemporary Art, Los Angeles commissioned Baumgarten to create a work that incorporated the photo documentation of his trip; however, the intended piece was never realized. Instead, the photographs were later published along with eleven short stories in an artists' book titled "Carbon." For his 1993 six-week solo exhibition at the Guggenheim Baumgarten printed the names of indigenous North American peoples on the inner curves of the rotunda.

In 1994, Baumgarten landscaped the modern medium-sized woodland garden full of weeds and wild flowers for the Fondation Cartier pour l'Art Contemporain designed by Jean Nouvel. The garden's name, Theatrum Botanicum, refers to the inventories of medicinal plants and herbs kept by medieval monks. In the late 1990s, he was commissioned with an installation at the Bundespräsidialamt. In 2002, he received a commission for Seven Rings for Contemplation, a permanent public artwork for Denning's Point State Park in Beacon, New York. For Concordance (2003-2006), a series of c-prints, Baumgarten conducted an extensive survey of the setting and botany of the Serralves Park in Porto.

Since 1994 Baumgarten has been Professor at the Universität der Künste Berlin, Germany. In 2011, he was a fellow at Villa Massimo, Rome.

Baumgarten died on December 2, 2018.

== Exhibitions ==
Since his first solo show at Galerie Konrad Fischer in Düsseldorf in 1972, Baumgarten has exhibited widely at a global scale. Important solo shows include the Carnegie Museum of Art, Pittsburgh (1987); as well as Centre Georges Pompidou, Paris (1987); The National Museum of Modern Art in Kyoto and Tokyo (1996); the Hamburger Kunsthalle, Hamburg (2001); the Kunsthaus Bregenz, Bregenz, Austria; and the Museo Nacional Centro de Arte Reina Sofía, Madrid (2016). In 1984, he and A.R. Penck represented Germany at the Venice Biennale. He has also participated in documenta V (1972), VII (1982), IX (1992), and X (1997); the 1991 and 1988 Carnegie International; Skulptur Projekte Münster, 1987; and the 49th, 41st and 38th Venice Biennale (2001, 1984 and 1978).

Baumgarten is represented by Galerie Thomas Zander, Cologne, and Marian Goodman Gallery, New York/Paris.

== Collections ==
Baumgarten's works are held in numerous museum collections, including the Tate; Dallas Museum of Art, Dallas; Metropolitan Museum of Art, New York; Migros Museum, Zurich; MIT List Visual Arts Center, Cambridge, Massachusetts; Museo Nacional Centro de Arte Reina Sofía, Madrid; Museu d'Art Contemporani de Barcelona; Museum Abteiberg, Mönchengladbach; Museum Folkwang, Essen; Museum für Moderne Kunst, Frankfurt am Main; Museum of Modern Art, New York; Hamburger Bahnhof, Berlin; National Gallery of Art, Washington, D.C.; National Museum of Modern Art, Kyoto; Stedelijk Museum, Amsterdam; Van Abbemuseum, Eindhoven; De Pont museum, Tilburg and Vancouver Art Gallery.

== Recognition ==
Baumgarten's numerous awards have included the MFI Prize, Essen (2003); the Lichtwark Prize of the City of Hamburg, Germany (1997); The Golden Lion, First Prize of the 41st Venice Biennale (1984); the Prize of the State of Nordrhein-Westfalen (1976); and the Prize of the City of Düsseldorf (1974).

== Literature ==
- Baumgarten, Lothar: Unsettled Objects. Edition of Guggenheim Magazine published in conjunction with the exhibition AMERICA Invention. New York: Solomon R. Guggenheim Museum, 1993. (Contains photographic documentation of the Pitt Rivers' collection and essays on ethnographic collecting)
- Baumgarten, Lothar: Eklipse. With a text by Thomas Wagner. Düsseldorf: Richter Verlag, 1997, ISBN 3-928762-80-X
- Baumgarten, Lothar: See Other Side / Imago Mundi (Unsigned). Kleve: Freundeskreis Museum Kurhaus und Koekkoek-Haus, 2005, ISBN 3-934935-29-X
- Kersting, Hannelore (ed.): Kunst der Gegenwart. 1960 bis 2007. Städtisches Museum Abteiberg Mönchengladbach, 2007, ISBN 978-3-924039-55-4
