= Marian Goodman =

American contemporary art gallerist (1928–2026)

- Born: Marian Ruth Geller; June 15, 1928; New York City, U.S.
- Died: January 22, 2026 (aged 97); Los Angeles, California, U.S.
- Education: Little Red School House; Emerson College; Columbia University
- Occupations: Art dealer; gallerist
- Known for: Founder and owner of Marian Goodman Gallery
- Spouse: William Goodman
- Children: Michael Goodman and Amy Goodman Kiefer
- Parent(s): Maurice P. Geller and Stella (Freulicht) Geller
- Awards: Leo Award (2016)

Marian Goodman (born Marian Ruth Geller; June 15, 1928 – January 22, 2026) was an American contemporary art gallerist. She was the founder and owner of the Marian Goodman Gallery, a contemporary art gallery that opened in Manhattan, New York, in 1977. Considered one of the most influential gallerists in contemporary art, Goodman is known for introducing European artists such as Gerhard Richter, Joseph Beuys, and Marcel Broodthaers to the United States.

Goodman gained prominence in the art world in the 1970s and 1980s, a time when few women worked in this sector. Her gallery has represented a number of artists including Steve McQueen, Thomas Struth, Pierre Huyghe, Thomas Schütte, Lothar Baumgarten, Tony Cragg, Richard Deacon, Tacita Dean, Christian Boltanski, Annette Messager, Chantal Akerman, Niele Toroni, Gabriel Orozco, Maurizio Cattelan, Giuseppe Penone, Giovanni Anselmo, Jeff Wall, Rineke Dijkstra, and William Kentridge.

== Early beginnings ==
Born Marian Ruth Geller in New York City on June 15, 1928, Goodman grew up on the Upper West Side and attended the Little Red School House and Emerson College. In 1956, Goodman was one of a group of mothers who successfully battled Robert Moses when he tried to expand the parking lot at Tavern on the Green, forcing him to build a playground instead.

Her father, Maurice P. Geller, a first-generation Hungarian-American accountant, collected art, particularly that of Milton Avery. Goodman became an art dealer as a new divorcée who needed to support herself and two children. In 1962, she organized a book of cheap prints of New York paintings to raise funds for the Walden School, where her children were students. In 1963, Goodman attended graduate school in art history at Columbia University. She was the only woman in her class.

Goodman and partners opened Multiples, dealing in artists’ editions, in 1965. Multiples published prints, multiples, and books by American artists, such as Richard Artschwager, John Baldessari, Dan Graham, Sol LeWitt, Roy Lichtenstein, Claes Oldenburg, Robert Smithson, and Andy Warhol. In 1970, the year Multiples exhibited for the first time at Art Basel, Goodman published Artists and Photographs, a 19-piece portfolio exploring the way artists such as Ed Ruscha, Christo, and Bruce Nauman were incorporating photography into their work.

From 1968 to 1975, Multiples worked with European artists, introducing early editions by Joseph Beuys, Marcel Broodthaers, Blinky Palermo, and Gerhard Richter to American audiences. Multiples also operated a space on La Cienega Boulevard on the Westside of Los Angeles for two years in the 1970s.

== Marian Goodman Gallery ==
Goodman's failure to secure Broodthaers an outlet in New York was the impetus behind her decision to open her own gallery featuring his work as the initial exhibition. Goodman opened the Marian Goodman Gallery on 38 East 57th Street in 1977. (Unfortunately, Broodthaers died before the opening). In 1984, she moved the gallery to its present quarters, at 24 West Fifty-seventh Street. She later discovered Lothar Baumgarten when she hired him to hang the gallery's display at a Düsseldorf art fair.

Marian Goodman Gallery opened its first space in Paris in 1995. In 1999, a permanent exhibition space was opened inside the Hôtel de Montmor, a 17th-century hotel particulier in the Marais district.

In 2014, the gallery opened an outpost in London, located in an 1,000 m^{2} (11,000 sq ft) space over two floors inside a former factory warehouse at Golden Square; the architect David Adjaye renovated the space. At the end of 2020, Goodman announced the London space would close due to the impacts of Brexit and COVID-19 and be replaced by a new initiative, Marian Goodman Projects, that has been conducting exhibits at other locations throughout the city since 2021.

In 2018, Goodman celebrated her 90th birthday at the palace and gardens of Versailles. In 2021, Goodman appointed Rose Lord, Junette Teng, Emily-Jane Kirwan, Leslie Nolen and Philipp Kaiser as partners in the Marian Goodman Gallery. The gallery also established an advisory committee of five longtime staff members to support the partners. Philipp Kaiser exited in May 2025. Also in 2022, the gallery announced that it would expand to Los Angeles by 2023, taking over a 1,200 m^{2} (13,000 sq ft) warehouse campus from the 1920s in Hollywood, designed by architectural firm Johnston Marklee & Associates and located at 1120 Seward Street.

In 2023, the gallery announced to relocate its New York space to 385 Broadway, occupying two floors of gallery space totalling 2,800 m^{2} (30,000 sq ft). Renovated by the architecture firm StudioMDA, the site include two floors of public exhibition space, one floor of private viewing rooms, a library and an archive in addition to art storage and office space.

=== Artists ===
Goodman has stated that she believes a dealer should be committed to working with an artist for fifteen to twenty years. As of 2023, the gallery mostly represents non-American artists, including:

- Eija-Liisa Ahtila
- Giovanni Anselmo
- Maurizio Cattelan
- James Coleman
- Tony Cragg
- Richard Deacon
- Tacita Dean
- Edith Dekyndt
- Rineke Dijkstra
- Pierre Huyghe
- Amar Kanwar
- Steve McQueen
- Annette Messager
- Delcy Morelos
- Gabriel Orozco
- Giuseppe Penone
- Anri Sala
- Tino Sehgal
- Tavares Strachan
- Thomas Struth
- Niele Toroni
- Adrián Villar Rojas
- Danh Vo

Kentridge, Struth and Orozco, like most of Goodman's artists, joined her relatively early in their careers. One exception is Richter, who had three exhibitions with Sperone Westwater before deciding to show simultaneously there and with Goodman. After several years of this joint arrangement, he dropped the original gallery.

Goodman also represented American artists, including:

- Andrea Fraser (since 2022)
- Julie Mehretu
- Maria Nordman
- Paul Sietsema

In addition to living artists, Marian Goodman Gallery handles the estates of the following:

- Chantal Akerman
- Lothar Baumgarten
- Christian Boltanski
- Dan Graham
- Robert Smithson (since 2020)
- Lawrence Weiner

Marian Goodman Gallery also formerly represented the following artists:

- John Baldessari
- Nan Goldin (2018–2023)
- Cristina Iglesias (until 2025)
- William Kentridge (1999–2024)
- Anselm Kiefer
- Allan McCollum (1980–1984)
- Juan Muñoz (1990–2020)
- Gerhard Richter (1985–2022)
- Hiroshi Sugimoto (until 2024)
- Allen Ruppersberg
- Jeff Wall (until 2016)
- Francesca Woodman

== Reputation ==
In an article in the New Yorker, art critic Peter Schjeldahl said "Goodman may be the most respected contemporary dealer in New York, for her taste, standards, and loyalty to her artists." Schjeldahl quotes Goodman's friend, the theorist and critic Benjamin H. D. Buchloh: "Her judgment is ultimately aesthetic, but she has a broad understanding of what a privileged existence allows and requires one to do. Her gallery has a certain subtle social horizon of responsibility." In Texte zur Kunst, critic Harmon Siegel wrote that she approaches art-dealing with "a sense that critique starts at home, that any art aspiring to confront social problems must also be self-critical, challenging the enterprise of the avant-garde itself." Michael Govan, director of Dia Art Foundation, describes her as one of the most powerful and influential dealers of the 20th century.

Described by Artnet as a "very private dealer", Marian Goodman was ranked 22 in ArtReview's guide to the 100 most powerful figures in contemporary art: Power 100, 2010. She was ranked 5th on the list of America's Most Powerful Art Dealers, according to Forbes magazine.

== Later life ==
In 2012, Goodman received an honorary degree from the CUNY Graduate Center. In 2016 she received the Leo Award, presented by Independent Curators International. Goodman died in Los Angeles on January 22, 2026, at the age of 97.
