= Regen Projects =

- Established: 1989
- Location: Hollywood, Los Angeles, California
- Coordinates: 34.0905°N 118.3377°W
- Type: Contemporary art gallery
- Owner: Shaun Caley Regen
- Website: www.regenprojects.com

Regen Projects is a contemporary art gallery in Los Angeles, California.

== History ==
Regen Projects was founded in 1989 by Stuart Regen and Shaun Caley Regen at 619 North Almont Drive in West Hollywood, California.

Artist Matthew Barney had his first solo gallery show at Regen Projects in 1991. The gallery was also the first to represent photographer Catherine Opie.

Stuart Regen died in 1998 from non-Hodgkin lymphoma.

In 2003, Regen Projects expanded to 633 North Almont Drive, and then in 2007, added another 230 m^{2} (2,500 sq ft) space at 9016 Santa Monica Boulevard, designed by architect Michael Maltzan.

In 2012, the gallery opened a new space in Hollywood at the corner of Santa Monica Boulevard and Highland Avenue, again designed by Maltzan.

== Artists ==
Regen Projects currently represents the following artists:

- Doug Aitken
- Kader Attia
- Matthew Barney
- Kevin Beasley (since 2021)
- Walead Beshty
- John Bock
- Abraham Cruzvillegas
- Lizzie Fitch
- Theaster Gates
- Rachel Harrison
- Alex Hubbard
- Elliott Hundley
- Anish Kapoor
- Toba Khedoori
- Liz Larner
- Glenn Ligon
- Marilyn Minter
- Catherine Opie
- Silke Otto-Knapp
- Raymond Pettibon
- Elizabeth Peyton
- Jack Pierson
- Lari Pittman
- Richard Prince
- Daniel Richter
- Willem de Rooij
- Wolfgang Tillmans
- Ryan Trecartin
- Gillian Wearing
- James Welling
- Sue Williams
- Andrea Zittel

In addition to living artists, Regen Projects also handles the estates of the following:

- Dan Graham
- Lawrence Weiner
