= Cappelle sul Tavo =

- Comune
- Comune di Cappelle sul Tavo
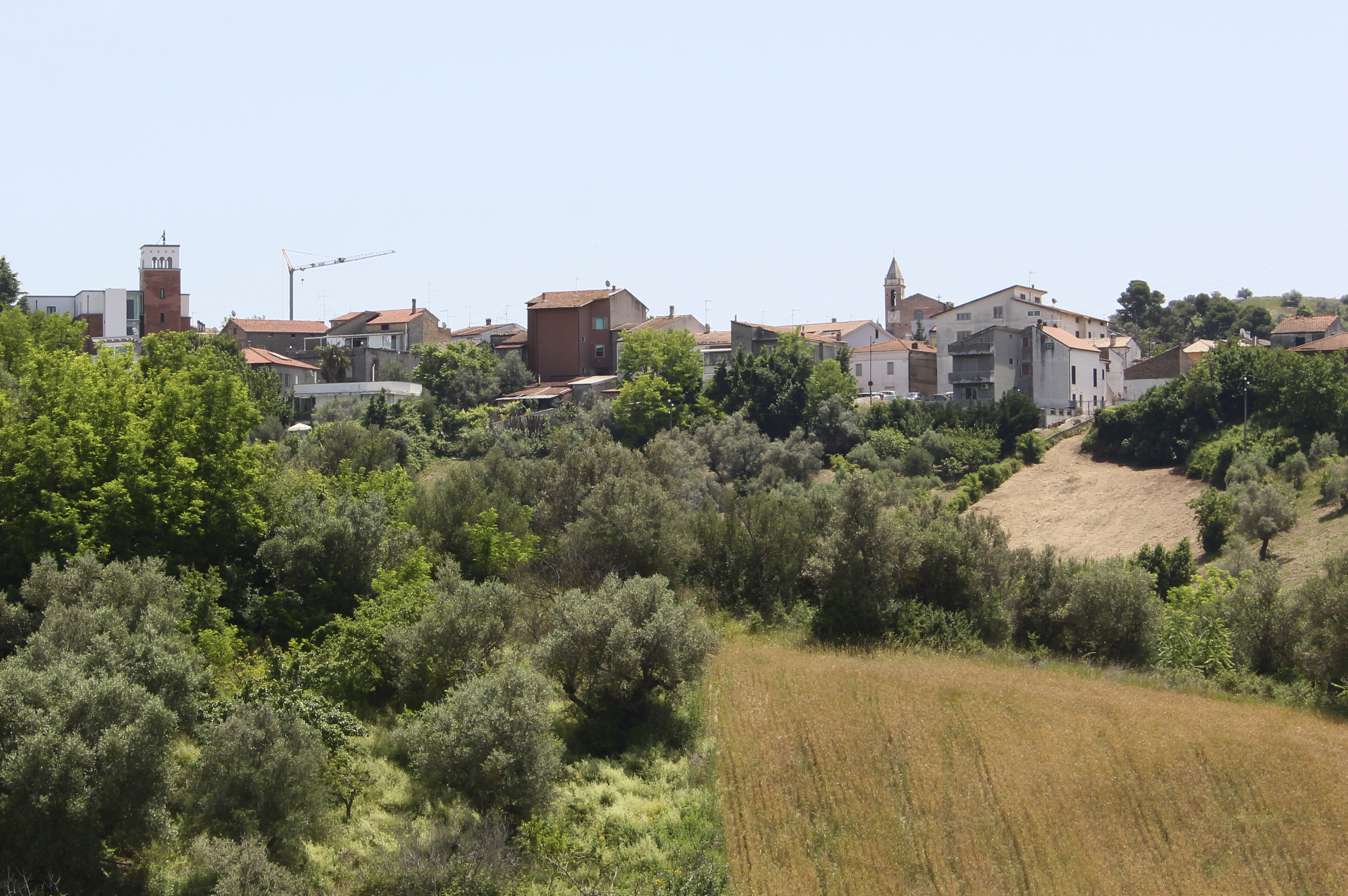
- View of Cappelle sul Tavo

- Coat of arms

- Location within Italy Location within Abruzzo
- Coordinates: 42°28′N 14°06′E
- Country: Italy
- Region: Abruzzo
- Province: Pescara (PE)
- Frazioni: Staffieri

Government
  - Mayor: Lorenzo Ferri (since 2019) (Ind.)

Area
  - Total: 5.46 km^{2} (2.11 sq mi)
- Elevation: 122 m (400 ft)

Population (2024)
  - Total: 4,068
  - Density: 745/km^{2} (1,930/sq mi)
- Time zone: UTC+1 (CET)
  - Summer (DST): UTC+2 (CEST)
- Postal code: 65010
- Dialing code: 085
- Patron saint: San Pasquale

Cappelle sul Tavo (Abruzzese: Li Cappélle) is a comune and town in the Province of Pescara in the Abruzzo region of Italy.

== History ==
Cappelle sul Tavo has been an independent municipality since 1905. Previously, it was part of the municipality of Montesilvano.

The name probably derives from a number of small "cappelle" (chapels) among the woods. The name "Cappelle" also appears in documents of the 11th and 14th centuries and is represented in the emblem of the town, showing two Gothic chapels.

Images of Cappelle sul Tavo

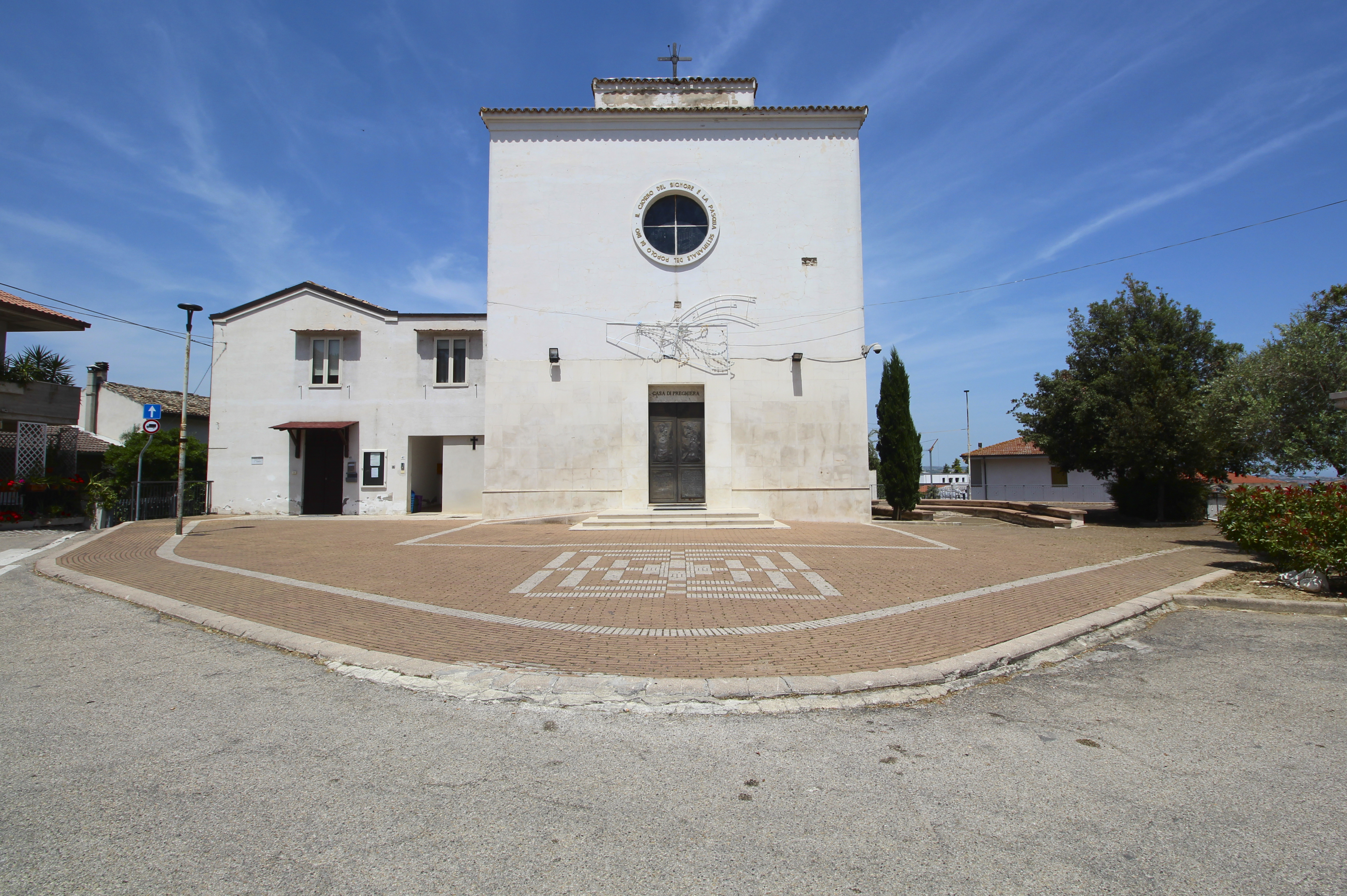
The Church Beata Vergine Maria Lauretana

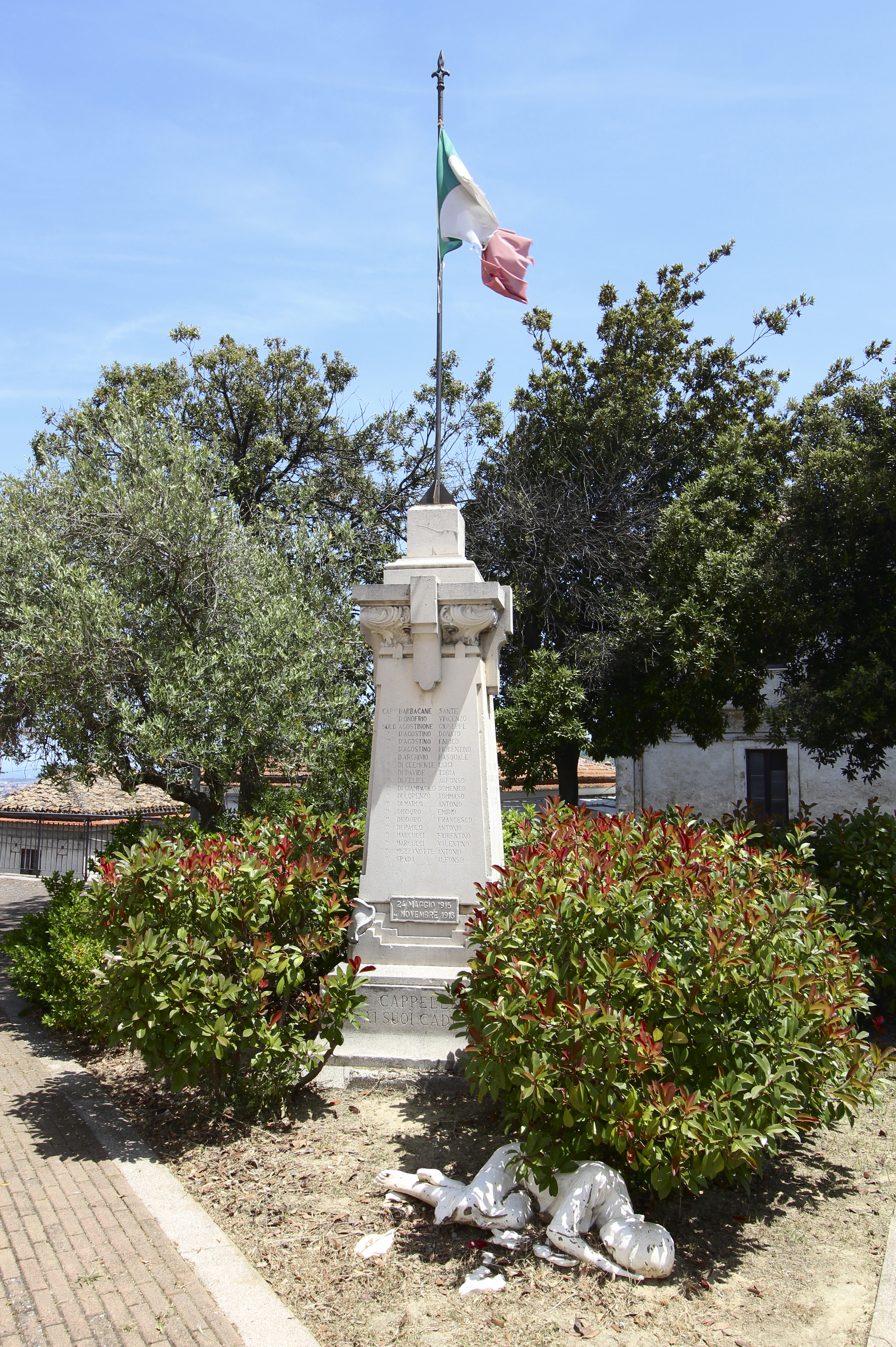
World War I memorial

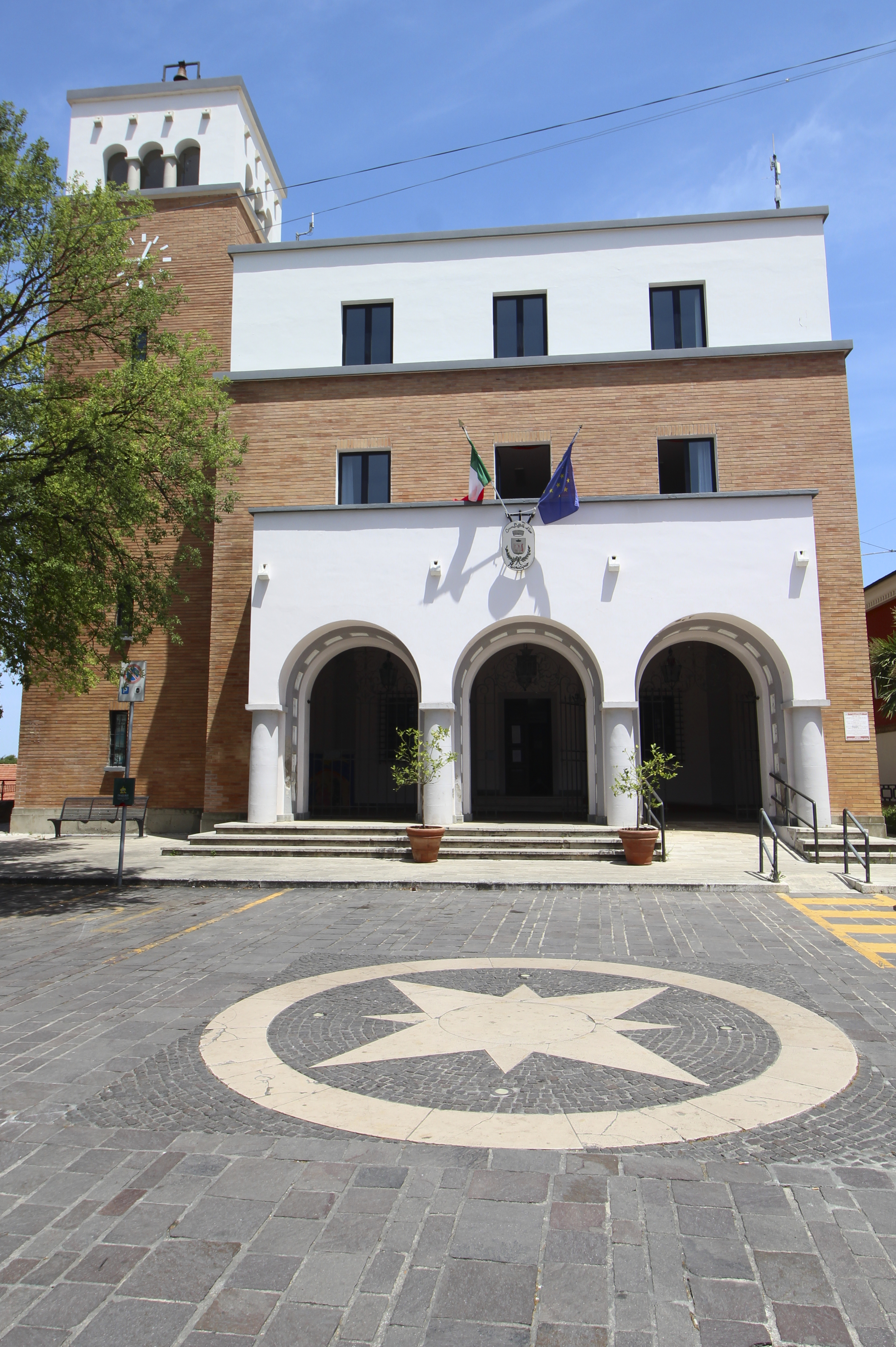
town hall
