= Teresa Hubbard and Alexander Birchler =

American-Swiss artist duo

Teresa Hubbard
- Born: 1965 (age 60–61); Dublin, Ireland
- Education: Skowhegan School of Painting and Sculpture, Yale University, Nova Scotia College of Art and Design
- Known for: Film, video art, photography, sculpture
- Notable work: Flora, 2017
- Movement: Conceptualism, feminism

Alexander Birchler
- Born: 1962 (age 63–64); Baden, Switzerland
- Education: Hochschule für Gestaltung und Kunst, Basel, Aalto University School of Arts, Design and Architecture, Nova Scotia College of Art and Design
- Known for: Film, video art, photography, sculpture
- Notable work: Flora, 2017
- Movement: Conceptualism, feminism

Teresa Hubbard (born 1965, Dublin, Ireland) and Alexander Birchler (born 1962, Baden, Switzerland), often shortened to Hubbard / Birchler, are an American-Swiss artist duo who make short films and photographs about the construction of narrative time and space. Their work invites open-ended reflections on memory, place and cinema, and first gained international attention with their participation in the 48th Venice Biennale curated by Harald Szeemann. Hubbard and Birchler were showcased in the PBS series Art:21.

== Life and career ==
Hubbard was born in Dublin, Ireland in 1965, grew up in Australia and later attended the Skowhegan School of Painting and Sculpture, Maine, as well as the graduate sculpture program at Yale University School of Art, New Haven, Connecticut. Birchler was born in Baden, Switzerland in 1962 and studied at the Hochschule für Gestaltung und Kunst, Basel (Academy of Art and Design Basel) and the University of Art and Design Helsinki, in Helsinki, Finland. They began collaborating as artists-in-residence at the Banff Centre for the Arts. Hubbard and Birchler later both received their MFAs from the Nova Scotia College of Art and Design, Halifax, Canada. In 2007, they were selected by Jeff Wall as Fellows at Akademie Schloss Solitude, Stuttgart.

As life partners, Hubbard and Birchler have lived and worked in Canada, Switzerland, Germany and the United States. Currently they are based in Austin, Texas, where Hubbard holds the William and Bettye Nowlin Professor in Photography in the Department of Art and Art History at The University of Texas at Austin.

Both Hubbard and Birchler are faculty members at EGS, the European Graduate School in Saas-Fee, Switzerland. They have both taught at Bard College at the Milton Avery Graduate School of the Arts, New York.

In 2017 Hubbard / Birchler represented Switzerland at the 57th Venice Biennial in the Swiss Pavilion in the exhibition Women of Venice, curated by Philipp Kaiser.

== Recognition ==
- 2017: Doctor of Fine Arts, honoris causa, Nova Scotia College of Art and Design University, Halifax, Canada

== Collections ==
Hubbard / Birchler's works of art are included in numerous private and public collections, including the Aargauer Kunsthaus, Aarau; Art Gallery of Western Australia Perth, Australia; the Walter H. Bechtler Stiftung, Switzerland; the Blanton Museum of Art at the University of Texas at Austin, Texas; the Centre for Photography, University of Salamanca, Spain; the Centro Galego de Arte Contemporánea, Santiago de Compostela, Spain; the Columbus Museum of Art, Ohio; the Daros Collection, Zürich, Switzerland; the Hirshhorn Museum and Sculpture Garden, Washington D.C.; the Huis Marseille Foundation for Photography, Amsterdam, Netherlands; the International Center of Photography, New York City; the Israel Museum, Jerusalem, Israel; Kunsthaus Zürich, Switzerland; Kunsthalle zu Kiel, Germany; Kunstmuseum St. Gallen, Switzerland; the Linda Pace Foundation, San Antonio, USA; the Museum of Fine Arts, Houston, USA; the Museum of Contemporary Art, MOCA Los Angeles, USA; Kunstmuseum Basel, Switzerland; the Modern Art Museum, Fort Worth, USA; the Museo de Arte Contemporáneo de Castilla y León, Spain; the Museum Sammlung Goetz, Munich, Germany; Neues Museum, Nuremberg, Germany; the Norton Museum of Art, West Palm Beach, USA; the Staedel Museum, Frankfurt, Germany; the Staatsgalerie Stuttgart, Germany; Pinakothek der Moderne, Munich, Germany; the Swiss Federal Office of Culture, Bern, Switzerland; the Thyssen-Bornemisza Contemporary Art Foundation, Vienna, Austria; the Ulrich Museum of Art, Wichita, Kansas, USA; the University of St. Gallen, Switzerland; and the Yokohama Museum of Art, in Yokohama, Japan.

== Publications ==
- Ellegood, Anne, Inka Graeve Ingelmann, Jeffrey Kastner et al. Sound Speed Marker. Exh. cat. Ballroom Marfa. New York: Distributed Art Publishers, 2015. (ISBN 978-1-9389-2282-4)
- Schuppli, Madeline, Andrea Karnes, Iris Dressler, Sara Arrhenius. No Room to Answer: Extended Version. Exh. cat. Aarau: Aargauer Kunsthaus, 2009. (ISBN 978-3-905004-33-5)
- Kaiser, Philipp, Dominic Molon, Maya Naef. House with Pool. Exh. cat., Museum für Gegenwartskunst, Basel. Basel: Christoph Merian, 2004. (ISBN 3856162135)
- Hentschel, Martin, Philipp Kaiser, Konrad Bitterli. Wild Walls. Exh. cat. Bielefeld: Kerber, 2001. (ISBN 3-933040-75-2)
