= Delcy Morelos =

Colombian artist (born 1967)

- Born: 1967 (age 58–59); Tierralta, Colombia

Delcy Morelos (born 1967, Tierralta, Colombia) is a Colombian artist known for sculptures and large installations made with natural materials.

== Life and career ==
She was born in 1967. She began her career in painting. Her recent institutional presentations have included El abrazo at Dia Chelsea in New York in 2023, Interwoven at the Pulitzer Arts Foundation in St. Louis in 2024, and Profundis at Centro Andaluz de Arte Contemporáneo in Seville in 2024. Her exhibition The Womb Space has been shown at the Museo Universitario Arte Contemporáneo. Her 2025 exhibition at Hamburger Bahnhof in Berlin involved a large installation using cinnamon, cloves, tobacco, and honey. In May and June 2026, she is scheduled to present her first British public commission at the Barbican's outdoor Sculpture Court. She is represented by Marian Goodman Gallery. She lives in Bogotá.

== Awards ==
In 2024, Delcy Morelos was awarded the Pérez Prize, at the Pérez Art Museum Miami, Florida. The prize grants an unrestricted $50,000 cash grant to artists in recognition of their life achievements.
