= Minerva Cuevas =

Mexican conceptual artist

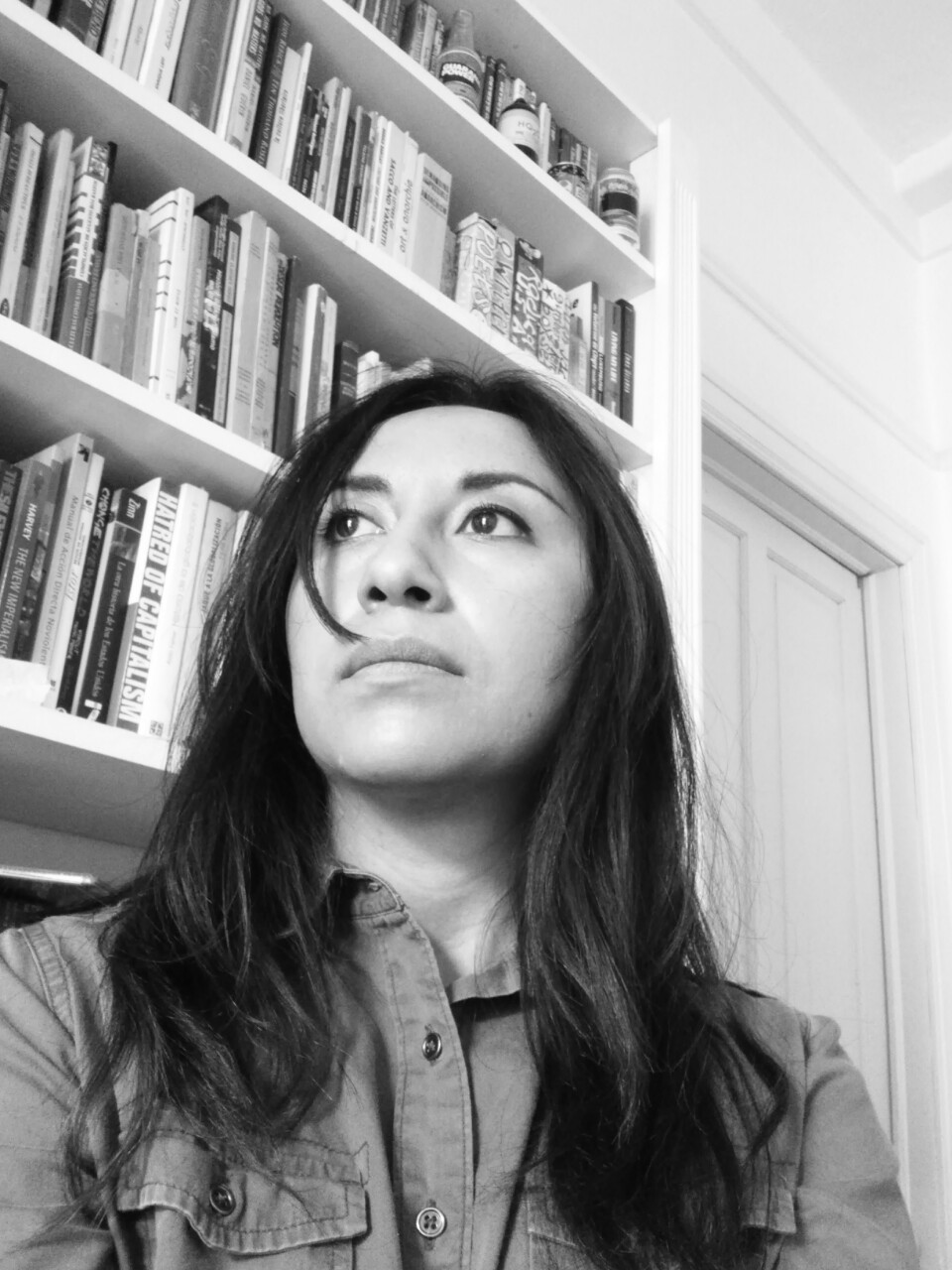
- Born: 1975 (age 49–50); Mexico City
- Known for: conceptual art

Minerva Cuevas (born 1975) is a Mexican conceptual artist known for site-specific interventions guided by social and political research and social change ideals. Her production includes installation, video works and photographic works as well as contextual interventions in specific locations. She lives and works in the neighborhood of el Centro Histórico in Mexico City, often directing her artistic and social efforts towards questioning the capitalist system. She is a member of Irational.org and the founder of the Mejor Vida Corp. (1998) and International Understanding Foundation (2016).

== Early life and education ==
Cuevas studied at the National School of Plastic Arts, UNAM from 1993 to 1997.

Cuevas also worked with the San Francisco Museum of Modern Art San Francisco Museum of Modern Art as part of their Public Knowledge curatorial initiative. She engaged with local San Franciscans about the city's changing ecology as explored through the theme of fire.

She was cited in Rubén Gallo's book New Tendencies of Mexican Art. In this 2004 book, Gallo recognizes how Cuevas’s connection to the streets of Mexico City and the struggles of working people guides her multimedia, often web-based artwork and social activism.

== Notable works ==
=== Mejor Vida Corp ===
In 1998, Cuevas founded a project titled Mejor Vida Corp (MVC or Better Life Corporation). A non-profit organization. MVC provides free products and services, the project distributes “international ID cards, subway tickets, and barcodes for grocery stores”—all examples of what art historian Pamela M. Lee describes as “movement as a movement,” incremental disruptions of neo-liberalist policy through social welfare endeavors. Cuevas is the sole proprietor of the Mejor Vida Corporation, working as the owner, CEO, CFO, public relations officer, fundraiser, and more. The program addresses social and economic issues, in what becomes a complex and sophisticated critique of a traditional institution, the capitalist corporation. Professor of Latin American Studies Scott Baugh analyzes this, concluding that, through the satire and parodying of an official business website, Cuevas embodies the “traditions of the film avant-garde and of the Latina/Latino cultural expression…[which] tend to resist, by definition and pragmatically, the conventionality of the mainstream.”

According to Baugh, the digitized radio transmissions of Cuevas's MVC introduce an accessible voice that bypasses the Eurocentric conventions of corporate media and establishes a new mode of active communication with the Mexican working class.

=== Video and installation ===
As detailed by art critic Jean Fisher, Cuevas's written accompaniment to the performance piece, Drunker (1995), presents substance abuse "as a means to 'obliterate’ the anguish of trauma, where the sufferer is caught between the compulsion to bear witness to the catastrophe and the impossibility of articulating it."

Cuevas’s solo exhibitions engage a variety of artistic forms, culminating in multisensory installations that, while operating in high art institutions, advocate public interventionism. Many of these contain specific visual and auditory allusions that generate social commentary. In particular, Cuevas’s Social Entomology, exhibited at the Van Abbemuseum in 2007, employs projected cellular and animal imagery, overlaid with a metaphorical orchestral soundtrack entitled Insect Concert, to remark on human societal structure and its exploitative relationship with the natural world. Critic Francis McKee explains the technological nature of Social Entomology as Cuevas’s evidence for modern humanity’s commodification of animals and the natural world.

In a text entitled “Corporatocracy, Democracy and Social Change (in Mexico and Beyond),” Cuevas co-authors a discourse on the contemporary dissonance between humanity and the natural world. Her remarks affirm her opposition to the anthropocentric attitude driving industrialization, which has historically occurred at the expense of, not only animals and the natural world, but also indigenous and agrarian peoples. Moreover, initially explored in her Information/Misinformation billboard series, Cuevas's thoughts on the communicative importance of “national rumor” in a modern age find footing in the written record of the Lier En Boog philosophy and art symposium, Ljubljana: Information Strategies, in which she participated in 2002.

== Awards and fellowships ==
Cuevas was awarded the DAAD grant in Berlin (2005), reinvited in 2019 for a solo show at the daadgalerie in Berlín, Germany, was part of the Delfina Studios residency program in London (2001).

== Exhibitions ==
=== Biennials ===
- Liverpool Biennial. 2010
- 6th Berlin Biennale. Germany. 2010
- The History of a decade that has not yet been named. Lyon Biennial. France. 2007
- Três Fronteiras Bienal do Mercosul. Porto Alegre, Brazil. 2007
- How to live together. 27th Bienal de São Paulo Brazil. 2006
- Belonging. Sharjah Biennial. United Arab Emirates. 2005
- On Reason and Emotion. Biennale of Sydney. Australia. 2004
- Poetic Justice. XX Istanbul Biennial. Istanbul. Turkey. 2003
- Information-Misinformation. 24th Biennial of Graphic Arts. Ljubljana, Slovenia. 2001
- Bienal internacional de Fotografía, Centro de la Imagen. DF. MEX, 1999

=== Selected solo shows ===
- In Gods We Trust, kurimanzutto, New York. 2023
- Game Over, Museo Jumex, Mexico City. 2022
- No Room to Play. daadgalerie, Berlin. 2019
- Dissidência. Videobrasil, São Paulo. 2018
- Feast and Famine. kurimanzutto, Ciudad de México. 2015
- Minerva Cuevas. Museo de la Ciudad de México. 2012
- Minerva Cuevas. VanAbbe Museum. Netherlands. 2008
- La Venganza del Elefante, kurimanzutto, Mexico City. 2007
- Phenomena. Kunsthalle Basel. Switzerland. 2007
- Egalité. Le Grand Café-Centre d'art Contemporain. Saint-Nazaire, France. 2007
- Reconstrucción. Casa del Lago. UNAM. Mexico City. 2006
- The Economy of the Imaginary. Luckman Fine Arts Complex. Los Angeles, CA. USA . 2006
- Not Impressed By Civilization. The Banff Centre. Alberta, Canada. 2005
- On Property Reg Vardy Gallery. Sunderland, United Kingdom. 2005
- Schwarzfahrer are my heroes. DAAD Galerie, Berlin, Germany. 2004
- MVC Biotec Vienna Secession. Vienna, Austria. 2001
- Mejor Vida Corp. Museo Rufino Tamayo. Mexico City. 2000

== Collections ==
Cuevas' work is held in many permanent collections including: Tate, London; Centre Georges Pompidou, Paris; Guggenheim, New York; Museo Universitario de Arte Contemporáneo, Mexico City; Museo Jumex, Mexico City; Museum Ludwig, Cologne; and the Van Abbemuseum, Eindhoven, Netherlands.
