= Still Life (disambiguation) =

A still life is a work of art depicting inanimate subject matter.

Still Life, The Still Life, or Still Lives may also refer to:

== Art ==
- Category:Still life paintings
- Still Life (Rufino Tamayo), a 1954 mural by Rufino Tamayo
- Still life photography

== Film and television ==
=== Film ===
- Still Life (1974 film), an Iranian film directed by Sohrab Shahid Saless
- Still Life, a 1999 short film featuring Agnes Bernelle
- Still Life (2006 film), a Chinese film directed by Jia Zhangke
- The Still Life, a 2006 film by Joel A. Miller
- Still Life (2007 film), a Filipino film by Katski Flores
- Still Life (2013 film), a British film directed by Uberto Pasolini
- Still Life (2014 film), an Argentinian thriller film by Gabriel Grieco
- Still Life, fictional entities in the 2026 film Backrooms and the Backrooms web series

=== Television ===
- "Still Life" (CSI), a 2005 episode
- "Still Life" (The Dead Zone), a 2005 episode
- "Still Life" (Medium), a 2005 episode
- "Still Life" (The Twilight Zone), a 1986 episode
- Still Life, an unaired 2003 series starring Jensen Ackles

== Literature ==
- Still Life (Byatt novel), a 1985 novel by A. S. Byatt
- Still Life (Penny novel), a 2005 novel by Louise Penny
- Still Life (Winman novel), a 2021 novel by Sarah Winman
- Still Life, a 2009 novel by Joy Fielding
- The Still Life, a novel by David Chase
- "Still-Life", a short story by Barry N. Malzberg (writing as K.M. O'Donnell), included in the 1972 anthology Again, Dangerous Visions
- "Still Lives", a short story by Ian Potter in the 2002 Doctor Who anthology Short Trips: Zodiac
- Still Life, a panel cartoon by Jerry Robinson
- Still Life (poetry collection), a 2022 poetry collection by Jay Hopler

== Music ==
- Still Lives, a 1993 composition by Nicolas Collins

=== Performers ===
- Still Life (1970s UK band), a progressive rock band, or their self-titled album
- Still Life, original name of band 10,000 Maniacs
- Still Life (US band), an emo/emocore band, or several self-titled singles and split albums

=== Albums ===
- Still Life (American Standards album) or the title song, 2012
- Still Life (Annie Haslam album) or the title song, 1985
- Still Life (Aqualung album), 2003
- Still Life (The Connells album) or the title song, 1998
- Still Life (Dukes album), 2010
- Still Life (Fates Warning album), 1998
- Still Life (Kevin Morby album), 2014
- Still Life (The Listening Pool album) or the title song, 1994
- Still Life (Opeth album), 1999
- Still Life (The Paradise Motel album), 1996
- Still Life (Rolling Stones album), 1982
- Still Life (Van der Graaf Generator album) or the title song, 1976
- Still Life (Talking), by the Pat Metheny Group, 1987
- The Still Life (album), by Alessi's Ark, 2013
- Still Life, by Antischism, 1991
- Still Life, by Kodomo, 2008

=== Songs ===
- "Still Life" (BigBang song), 2022
- "Still Life" (RM song), 2022
- "Still Life", by Covenant from United States of Mind, 2000
- "Still Life", by Dala from Best Day, 2012
- "Still Life", by the Horrors from Skying, 2011
- "Still Life", by Iron Maiden from Piece of Mind, 1983
- "Still Life", by Men at Work from Two Hearts, 1985
- "Still Life", by Nefilim from Zoon, 1996
- "Still Life", by Oneohtrix Point Never from R Plus Seven, 2013
- "Still Life", by Redgum from Frontline, 1984
- "Still Life", by Suede from Dog Man Star, 1994

== Theatre ==
- Still Life (play), a 1936 play by Noël Coward
- Still Life (Byrne play), a 1982 play in the Slab Boys Trilogy by John Byrne
- Still Life, a 2007 play by Emily Mann

== Other uses ==
- Still life (cellular automaton), an unchanging pattern in a cellular automaton
- Still Life (video game), a 2005 video game

== See also ==
- Naturaleza muerta (disambiguation)
