= Museo Rufino Tamayo =

The Museo Rufino Tamayo, dedicated to the Mexican artist of the same name, may refer to:

- Museo Rufino Tamayo, Mexico City
- Museo Rufino Tamayo, Oaxaca
