= List of bands that played at Dagenham Roundhouse =

Between the years 1969 and 1975, many acts performed at the Dagenham Roundhouse venue, which was also known as the Village Blues Club.

Act	Date	Support band(s) and notes
Blodwyn Pig	29 Mar 1969	Killing Floor & Yellow Dog. Opening Night – membership 1s (5p) and entry 7s6d (37.5p)
Led Zeppelin	5 Apr 1969	Reflection & The Further
Terry Reid	12 Apr 1969	Sam Apple Pie
Taste (with Rory Gallagher)	19 Apr 1969	Steamhammer
Spooky Tooth	26 Apr 1969	
Savoy Brown	3 May 1969	
Chicken Shack	10 May 1969	SWAWRB
Fairport Convention	17 May 1969	Cancelled Due To Accident
Eclection	24 May 1969	
The Aynsley Dunbar Retaliation	31 May 1969	
Jethro Tull	7 Jun 1969	The Further
Spooky Tooth	14 Jun 1969	The Groundhogs
Caravan	21 Jun 1969	
Brian Auger and the Trinity	28 Jun 1969	
Family	5 Jul 1969	SWAWRB. (Some sources incorrectly suggest Friday 4 July)
Sam Apple Pie	12 Jul 1969	
Reflection	19 Jul 1969	
Edgar Broughton Band	26 Jul 1969	
Blossom Toes	2 Aug 1969	
Imagination	9 Aug 1969	
Bakerloo	16 Aug 1969	
Liverpool Scene	23 Aug 1969	
Closed for the Isle of Wight Festival	30 Aug 1969	
Sam Apple Pie	6 Sep 1969	
Edgar Broughton Band	13 Sep 1969	
Clouds	20 Sep 1969	King Crimson originally billed?
Renaissance	27 Sep 1969	Key
Savoy Brown	4 Oct 1969	
Circus	11 Oct 1969	
King Crimson	18 Oct 1969	
Howlin' Wolf	25 Oct 1969	Bent Cement
	1 Nov 1969	Family were scheduled, but it is believed that this gig was cancelled as Family played again on Tuesday 18 November
Graham Bond	8 Nov 1969	
Soft Machine	15 Nov 1969	Keith Tippett Group, SWAWRB
Family	18 Nov 1969	
Taste	22 Nov 1969	
Edgar Broughton Band	29 Nov 1969	
Principal Edwards Magic Theatre	6 Dec 1969	
Liverpool Scene	13 Dec 1969	
Deep Purple	20 Dec 1969	
Closed for Christmas	27 Dec 1969	
Stone the Crows	3 Jan 1970	
Tyrannosaurus Rex	10 Jan 1970	SWAWRB
Hard Meat	17 Jan 1970	Imagination. (Some sources suggest this was headlined by Colosseum)
Steamhammer	24 Jan 1970	Wildmouth
Pentangle	31 Jan 1970	
Edgar Broughton Band	7 Feb 1970	Morning
Heavy Jelly	14 Feb 1970	Key
Gracious!	21 Feb 1970	Morning
Family	28 Feb 1970	Stackridge
Sam Apple Pie	7 Mar 1970	Mr. Charlie
Fairport Convention	14 Mar 1970	Surly Bird
Blodwyn Pig	21 Mar 1970	Valhalla
Deep Purple	28 Mar 1970	Rat
Taste (with Rory Gallagher)	4 Apr 1970	Sour Milk Sea
Tyrannosaurus Rex	11 Apr 1970	Mandragon
Procol Harum	18 Apr 1970	Rat
Black Widow	25 Apr 1970	Judy Blue Eyes
Humble Pie	2 May 1970	My Cake
Deep Purple	9 May 1970	Ipsissimus
Mott the Hoople	16 May 1970	Killing Floor
Savoy Brown	23 May 1970	SWAWRB
High Tide	30 May 1970	Tupelo
Free	6 Jun 1970	Wet Paint
Taste (with Rory Gallagher)	13 Jun 1970	Gnidrolog
If	20 Jun 1970	Growth
Edgar Broughton Band	27 Jun 1970	Ben
Fairport Convention	4 Jul 1970	Uncle John's Gut
Stone the Crows	11 Jul 1970	Sweet Blindness
Writing On the Wall	18 Jul 1970	Grizelda
Sam Apple Pie	25 Jul 1970	Custers Track
Derek and the Dominos	1 Aug 1970	Supertramp
Quintessence	8 Aug 1970	National Head Band
Black Widow	15 Aug 1970	Principal Edwards
Yes	22 Aug 1970	Nosher Brown
Closed for the Isle of Wight Festival	29 Aug 1970	
Free	5 Sep 1970	Storm
Tyrannosaurus Rex	12 Sep 1970	Bram Stoker
Blodwyn Pig	19 Sep 1970	Howl
Family	26 Sep 1970	Mythica
The Tony Williams Lifetime (Jack Bruce)	3 Oct 1970	Aardvark
Savoy Brown	10 Oct 1970	Tear Gas
Mott the Hoople	17 Oct 1970	Nosher Brown
Hardin & York	24 Oct 1970	Surly Bird. (Some sources suggest Taste headlined but this may be based solely on a poster)
Bram Stoker	31 Oct 1970	Nick Pickett. The Edgar Broughton Band were due to headline but were stuck in Germany due to "passport hassles".
Quintessence	7 Nov 1970	Howl
Fleetwood Mac	14 Nov 1970	Mandrake
Fairport Convention	21 Nov 1970	Old Mick
Tyrannosaurus Rex	28 Nov 1970	Nick Pickett
Stone the Crows	5 Dec 1970	Rocking Chair
Pink Floyd	12 Dec 1970	
Quintessence	19 Dec 1970	Zoe
Family	2 Jan 1971	
Elton John	9 Jan 1971	Siege
Stud	16 Jan 1971	Brewer's Droop
Colosseum	23 Jan 1971	Karakorum
Skid Row	30 Jan 1971	Evolution
The Groundhogs	6 Feb 1971	Agapus (Replaced Camelot)
Gary Wright	13 Feb 1971	Premonition
Bonzo Dog Doo-Dah Band	20 Feb 1971	
Yes	27 Feb 1971	Kripple Vision
Curved Air	6 Mar 1971	Sweet Thunder
Skid Row	13 Mar 1971	Renia
Terry Reid	20 Mar 1971	Black Widow
Quintessence	27 Mar 1971	Elton John was billed, but this was cancelled on medical advice "due to the pressure of sustained work"
Family	3 Apr 1971	Nick Pickett
Mott the Hoople	10 Apr 1971	Collusion
Edgar Broughton Band	17 Apr 1971	Rocksana
Osibisa	24 Apr 1971	9:30 Fly
Fairport Convention	1 May 1971	Help Yourself
East of Eden	8 May 1971	Galloping Eyes
Atomic Rooster	15 May 1971	Zoo
Funkadelic	22 May 1971	National Head Band
Argent	29 May 1971	Patto (Originally Smooth Bitch but they cancelled)
Skid Row	5 Jun 1971	Gypsy and Sweet Thunder (Billed as 'Whitsun Festival')
Climax Chicago Blues Band	12 Jun 1971	Daddy Longlegs
Uriah Heep	19 Jun 1971	UK Tour. Supported by Hot Cottage
Stray	26 Jun 1971	Gnome Sweet Gnome
Wishbone Ash	3 Jul 1971	Razz
Medicine Head	10 Jul 1971	Audience
The Groundhogs	17 Jul 1971	Renia
Rory Gallagher	24 Jul 1971	Gollum
Sam Apple Pie	31 Jul 1971	Nimbo
Black Widow	7 Aug 1971	T2
Fairport Convention	14 Aug 1971	I.E.
The Grease Band	21 Aug 1971	Third World War
Fleetwood Mac	28 Aug 1971	
Climax Chicago Blues Band	4 Sep 1971	Quiver
Uriah Heep	11 Sep 1971	Open Road
Curved Air	18 Sep 1971	Jerusalem
Mott the Hoople	25 Sep 1971	Titanic
Wishbone Ash	2 Oct 1971	Hot Cottage
T2	9 Oct 1971	Jackal. Originally scheduled to be Vinegar Joe
Quintessence	16 Oct 1971	Beggars Opera
The Velvet Underground	19 Oct 1971	Vinegar Joe
Black Widow	23 Oct 1971	Collusion
Audience	30 Oct 1971	Ferry
Nazareth	6 Nov 1971	Guff
Heads Hands & Feet (with Albert Lee)	13 Nov 1971	Morgan. (Slade's site claim they played here that night, but there are no other references to this.)
Patto	20 Nov 1971	Carol Grimes Uncle Dog
Redbone	27 Nov 1971	One Hand Clapping
Sam Apple Pie	4 Dec 1971	
Osibisa	11 Dec 1971	Universe
Uriah Heep	18 Dec 1971	Bullet – The Xmas Party – rescheduled for 29 March 1972 due to power cut
The Groundhogs	1 Jan 1972	Grannie. The Genesis Archive suggests that Genesis played this night, but all the evidence is to the contrary.
Rory Gallagher	8 Jan 1972	Gravy Train
Mott the Hoople	15 Jan 1972	25 Views Of Worthing
The Sutherland Brothers Band	22 Jan 1972	Hawkwind Cancelled
UFO	29 Jan 1972	Byzantium
Stray	5 Feb 1972	
Pink Fairies	12 Feb 1972	Tranquillity. Some sources suggest Slade headlined, possibly because it appears on Don Powell's site, but as Slade were in Scotland both the day before and the day after, it seems unlikely.
Deep Purple	19 Feb 1972	Spontaneous Combustion
Wishbone Ash	26 Feb 1972	Cat Iron
Hawkwind	4 Mar 1972	Ragidy Andy
Slade	11 Mar 1972	Jackal
Heads Hands & Feet	18 Mar 1972	Junkyard Angel
Edgar Broughton	25 Mar 1972	Hawkwind, Steve Peregrin Took, Swastika
Uriah Heep	29 Mar 1972	Rescheduled from 18 December 1971
Status Quo	1 Apr 1972	Cathedral
Quintessence	8 Apr 1972	John St Field
Fairport Convention	15 Apr 1972	Fruupp
Good Habit	22 Apr 1972	Capability Brown
Stray	29 Apr 1972	Jonesy
Barclay James Harvest	6 May 1972	Cancelled
Dr. John	13 May 1972	Holy Roller
Brinsley Schwarz	20 May 1972	Refugee
Argent	27 May 1972	Spreadeagle
Hawkwind	3 Jun 1972	Magic Muscle
Osibisa	10 Jun 1972	Trapeze. Trapeze played first on a stage at the back of the venue. Osibisa then used the main stage at the front of the venue
Climax Chicago Blues Band	17 Jun 1972	Malaka
Status Quo	24 Jun 1972	Malaka
Rory Gallagher	1 Jul 1972	Byzantium
Sam Apple Pie	8 Jul 1972	Renia
Stackridge	15 Jul 1972	Incredible Hog
Atomic Rooster	22 Jul 1972	Slowhand
Vinegar Joe	29 Jul 1972	Biggles
Man	5 Aug 1972	String Driven Thing
Quintessence	12 Aug 1972	Coloured Coat
Uriah Heep	19 Aug 1972	Jake Holmes
Fruupp	26 Aug 1972	Shame. Skid Row had just split up, so their appearance was cancelled. However, Brush Shiels (from Skid Row) appeared as a guest with Fruupp.
Hawkwind	2 Sep 1972	Magic Muscle
Pink Fairies	9 Sep 1972	Jonesy
Electric Light Orchestra	16 Sep 1972	Rat
Roy Wood's Wizzard	23 Sep 1972	Shamelady
Status Quo	30 Sep 1972	Incredible Hog
Argent	7 Oct 1972	Kite
Arthur Browns Kingdom Come	14 Oct 1972	Biggles
East of Eden	21 Oct 1972	Refugee. There is some doubt over this gig.
Stray	28 Oct 1972	Succubus
Fusion Orchestra	4 Nov 1972	Alias
Budgie	11 Nov 1972	Zoe (may have been Cargo)
Snake Eye	18 Nov 1972	Rat
Nazareth	25 Nov 1972	Necromandus
Pink Fairies	2 Dec 1972	Springhill
Osibisa	9 Dec 1972	Mike Maran
Budgie	16 Dec 1972	Shamelady (may have been Cargo)
Stackridge	23 Dec 1972	Pigsty Hill Light Orchestra & Gordon Haskell
Stray	30 Dec 1972	Slowhand
Genesis	6 Jan 1973	Darien Spirit
Nazareth	13 Jan 1973	Fat Grapple
Status Quo	20 Jan 1973	Steel Peach
Focus	27 Jan 1973	Slowhand
Vinegar Joe	3 Feb 1973	Rusty Butler
Home	10 Feb 1973	Refugee
Silverhead	17 Feb 1973	Snow Leopard
Man	24 Feb 1973	Finbow
Fruupp	3 Mar 1973	Springhill
Pink Fairies	10 Mar 1973	Albert
Thin Lizzy	17 Mar 1973	Incredible Hog
Electric Light Orchestra	24 Mar 1973	Ro Ro
Stray	31 Mar 1973	Ro Ro
Stealers Wheel	7 Apr 1973	Innomina Pheris ?
JSD Band	14 Apr 1973	
Ellis	21 Apr 1973	Pussy
Glencoe	28 Apr 1973	Slowhand
Nazareth	5 May 1973	Robin Trower
Silverhead	12 May 1973	Rainbow Railway
Arthur Brown	19 May 1973	Albert
Medicine Head	26 May 1973	Pussy
Pink Fairies	2 Jun 1973	Fang
Marsha Hunt's 22	9 Jun 1973	Rimmington
Stealers Wheel	16 Jun 1973	Regeneration
Greenslade	23 Jun 1973	Refugee ?
Thin Lizzy	30 Jun 1973	Argus
Man	7 Jul 1973	John St. Field
Stray	14 Jul 1973	Guff
Jack the Lad	21 Jul 1973	Springhill
Silverhead	28 Jul 1973	Shamelady
Darryl Ways Wolf	4 Aug 1973	Pussy
Sam Apple Pie	11 Aug 1973	Mantra
Average White Band	18 Aug 1973	James Hogg
Closed for Bank Holiday	25 Aug 1973	
Pink Fairies	1 Sep 1973	All Things New (Was scheduled to be Nazareth)
Chicken Shack	8 Sep 1973	Fusion
Medicine Head	15 Sep 1973	Steel Peach
Edgar Broughton Band	22 Sep 1973	Budlipp Springer
Faust	29 Sep 1973	Henry Cow
Greenslade	6 Oct 1973	Piggy
Man	13 Oct 1973	Deke Leonard's Iceberg, Vyvyan Morris and John St Field.
Stray	20 Oct 1973	Contraband
Skin Alley	27 Oct 1973	Posters / Melody Maker ads are unclear on this night.
Nektar	3 Nov 1973	
Manfred Mann's Earth Band	10 Nov 1973	Regeneration
Silverhead	17 Nov 1973	Vineyard
Glencoe	24 Nov 1973	Bitter Harvest
Geordie	1 Dec 1973	
Sensational Alex Harvey Band	8 Dec 1973	Beckett
Golden Earring	11 Dec 1973	Moonstone
Greenslade	15 Dec 1973	Vineyard
Pink Fairies	22 Dec 1973	Piggy
Cockney Rebel	29 Dec 1973	Fancy
Gypsy	5 Jan 1974	Super Vole
Stray	12 Jan 1974	Vineyard
Fruupp	19 Jan 1974	Magill or Mcgill ??
Barclay James Harvest	26 Jan 1974	Support act: Regeneration. Set included: Summer Soldier; Medicine Man; She Said; One Hundred Thousand Smiles Out; Galadriel; After The Day; Crazy (Over You); Mocking Bird; Dark Now My Sky
Wild Turkey	2 Feb 1974	Mother Sun
Can	9 Feb 1974	
Babe Ruth	12 Feb 1974	
Nektar	16 Feb 1974	
Sensational Alex Harvey Band.	23 Feb 1974	Wooden Lion. There is some doubt over this gig, as it does not appear on the official SAHB list, and SAHB were in Scotland both the day before and the day after.
Snafu	2 Mar 1974	Guff
Cockney Rebel	5 Mar 1974	
Fusion Orchestra	9 Mar 1974	All Things New
Queen	12 Mar 1974	Nutz
Thin Lizzy	16 Mar 1974	Panache
Manfred Mann's Earth Band	23 Mar 1974	Janus
Ronnie Lane's Slim Chance	30 Mar 1974	Rab Noakes
Greenslade	6 Apr 1974	Gravy Train
Stray	13 Apr 1974	Pandemonium
Mantra	20 Apr 1974	Refugee Cancelled
Snafu	27 Apr 1974	Poser
Horslips	4 May 1974	Dizzy
Premiata Forneria Marconi (PFM)	11 May 1974	Paisley
Blodwyn Pig	18 May 1974	Budlipp Springer
The Groundhogs	25 May 1974	Vineyard
Alquin	1 Jun 1974	Regeneration
Barclay James Harvest	8 Jun 1974	Rare Bird. Incorrectly recorded in the source as 6/8. Possibly a US source?
Silverhead	15 Jun 1974	Scum of the Earth
Magma	19 Jun 1974	
Babe Ruth	22 Jun 1974	Mike Storey
Cockney Rebel	26 Jun 1974	Be Bop Deluxe
Nektar	29 Jun 1974	A Band Called O
Sutherland Brothers & Quiver	6 Jul 1974	Slowhand
Snafu	13 Jul 1974	Greep
Strider	20 Jul 1974	Percy
Budgie	27 Jul 1974	Regeneration
Edgar Broughton Band	3 Aug 1974	Cathedral
Stray	10 Aug 1974	Janus
Man	17 Aug 1974	Al Matthews
Sam Apple Pie	24 Aug 1974	National Flag (may have been Helter Skelter)
Greenslade	31 Aug 1974	Million Dollar Band
Heavy Metal Kids	7 Sep 1974	
Nutz	14 Sep 1974	Yellow Bird
Gong	21 Sep 1974	Vandella
Can	28 Sep 1974	U.K. Tour; unissued recording; set list;Gomorrha
Budgie	5 Oct 1974	Earthrise
Osibisa	12 Oct 1974	Clemen Pull
Manfred Mann's Earth Band	19 Oct 1974	Jackie Lynton's Grande
Thin Lizzy	26 Oct 1974	Janus
Fruupp	2 Nov 1974	David McWilliams
JSD Band	9 Nov 1974	Million Dollar Band
Nektar	16 Nov 1974	John St. Field
Ace	23 Nov 1974	Asylum
Stray	30 Nov 1974	Janus
The Groundhogs	7 Dec 1974	Regeneration
Greenslade	14 Dec 1974	Sorrel
Heavy Metal Kids	21 Dec 1974	Asylum
Ace	28 Dec 1974	Earthrise
Nutz	4 Jan 1975	Gasworks
Lindisfarne	11 Jan 1975	Clemen Pull
Snafu	18 Jan 1975	Cruiser
Dog Soldier	25 Jan 1975	Cancelled
Edgar Broughton Band	25 Jan 1975	Still Life
A Band Called O	1 Feb 1975	All Things New
Budgie	8 Feb 1975	Lee Kosmin Band
Sutherland Brothers & Quiver	15 Feb 1975	Clemen Pull
Fruupp	22 Feb 1975	Double Sausage Band
Dr. Feelgood	1 Mar 1975	Slippery Sam.There is some doubt over this gig, as it does not appear on the official Dr Feelgood list, and the Naughty Rhythms Tour, with Chilli Willi & The Red Hot Peppers and Kokomo as support, finished the previous day.
Stray	8 Mar 1975	Regeneration
The Groundhogs	15 Mar 1975	Panache & Good Thinking
Alvin Lee & Company	22 Mar 1975	Janus
Osibisa	29 Mar 1975	Clemen Pull
Nutz	5 Apr 1975	Oasis
Jackie Lynton's Grande	12 Apr 1975	Krakatoa
Rory Gallagher	19 Apr 1975	Roland
Snafu	26 Apr 1975	Badge
Budgie	3 May 1975	Borzoi
Hatfield and the North	10 May 1975	Superchild
Kokomo	17 May 1975	Lee Kosmin Band
Heavy Metal Kids	24 May 1975	Sorrel
Sassafras	31 May 1975	Stonehenge
Barclay James Harvest	5 Jun 1975	Charity show – Barclay James Harvest was billed but did not appear
Thin Lizzy	7 Jun 1975	Good Thinking
Dr. Feelgood	14 Jun 1975	Grandma Moses
A Band Called O	21 Jun 1975	Necromancer
Closed	28 Jun 1975	Curved Air cancelled
Stray	5 Jul 1975	Oasis
Kursaal Flyers	12 Jul 1975	Juggler
Mama Bear	19 Jul 1975	Wally & Pardon Me Sir were originally scheduled
Nutz	26 Jul 1975	Krakatoa
Snafu	2 Aug 1975	Razorbacks
Judas Priest	9 Aug 1975	Benefit
Motörhead	16 Aug 1975	Cock Sparrow
Closed for Bank Holiday	23 Aug 1975	
Chapman Whitney Streetwalkers	30 Aug 1975	Stirling
Gonzalez	6 Sep 1975	Dennis Connolly Band
UFO	13 Sep 1975	Clemen Pull
Babe Ruth	20 Sep 1975	Easy
Pink Fairies	27 Sep 1975	Pardon Me Sir
Be Bop Deluxe	4 Oct 1975	Necromancer
Zzebra	11 Oct 1975	
A Band Called O	18 Oct 1975	Steve Walker Band
Sassafras	25 Oct 1975	Mean Streak
Thin Lizzy	1 Nov 1975	Handbag
Sailor	8 Nov 1975	Easy. The final night at the Village. The poster appeared with the following text on it: "We regret that due to objections from the G.L.C. the club will be closed after this Saturday because of complaints from local residents regarding the noise. We hope the club will be ready to re-open very shortly. Please watch MM for full details of re-opening. If you would like to help with a petition please write to the Roundhouse." The venue eventually reopened nearly 37 years later.
Stray	19 May 2012	Del Bromhams's Blues Devils / Steve Kelly (Reunion I).
The Big Blues Jam (Jon Amor/Pete Gage/Mark Barrett/Dave Doherty & Friends)	11 May 2013	Jon Amor (Reunion II).
The Pink Torpedoes (Pete Gage/Paul Hartshorn/Pete Lowrey/Dave Raeburn)	28 Sep 2013	Steve Kelly (Reunion III).
Stray	31 May 2014	Blues Devils / Del Bromham (Reunion IV)
Son of Man & the All Stars Band	13 Sep 2014	The band featured George Jones (Son of Micky Jones) along with Bob Richards on drums who were both with MAN and they were joined by several members of SASSAFRAS (Reunion V)
Martin Turner plays the music of Wishbone Ash	30 May 2015	Steve Kelly (Reunion VI)
Dr. Feelgood	27 May 2017	Del Bromham. (Reunion X) This marks the return of the Village Blues Club to its original home.
Stray	2 Sep 2017	Ken Pustelnik's Groundhogs. (Reunion XI)
Son of Man with special guest Alan "Tweke" Lewis	22 Sep 2018	The Green Ray and Rostock. (Reunion XII)
Atomic Rooster featuring Pete French and Steve Bolton	30 Mar 2019	Landmarq. (Reunion XIII) 50th Anniversary
Martin Turner plays the music of Wishbone Ash	16 Jan 2021	(Reunion XIIII). Cancelled due to COVID-19.

Much of the information above otherwise unreferenced is collated from published pictures of posters, tickets etc.

In addition to the above, the bands below played but no dates can be confirmed:

Elder Kindred

Walrus (c.1971)

The bands below are rumoured to have played, but no evidence can be found:

Don Cherry

Leo Sayer (possibly 6 July 1974)

10CC
