= Mixografia =

Art gallery and printer in California, US

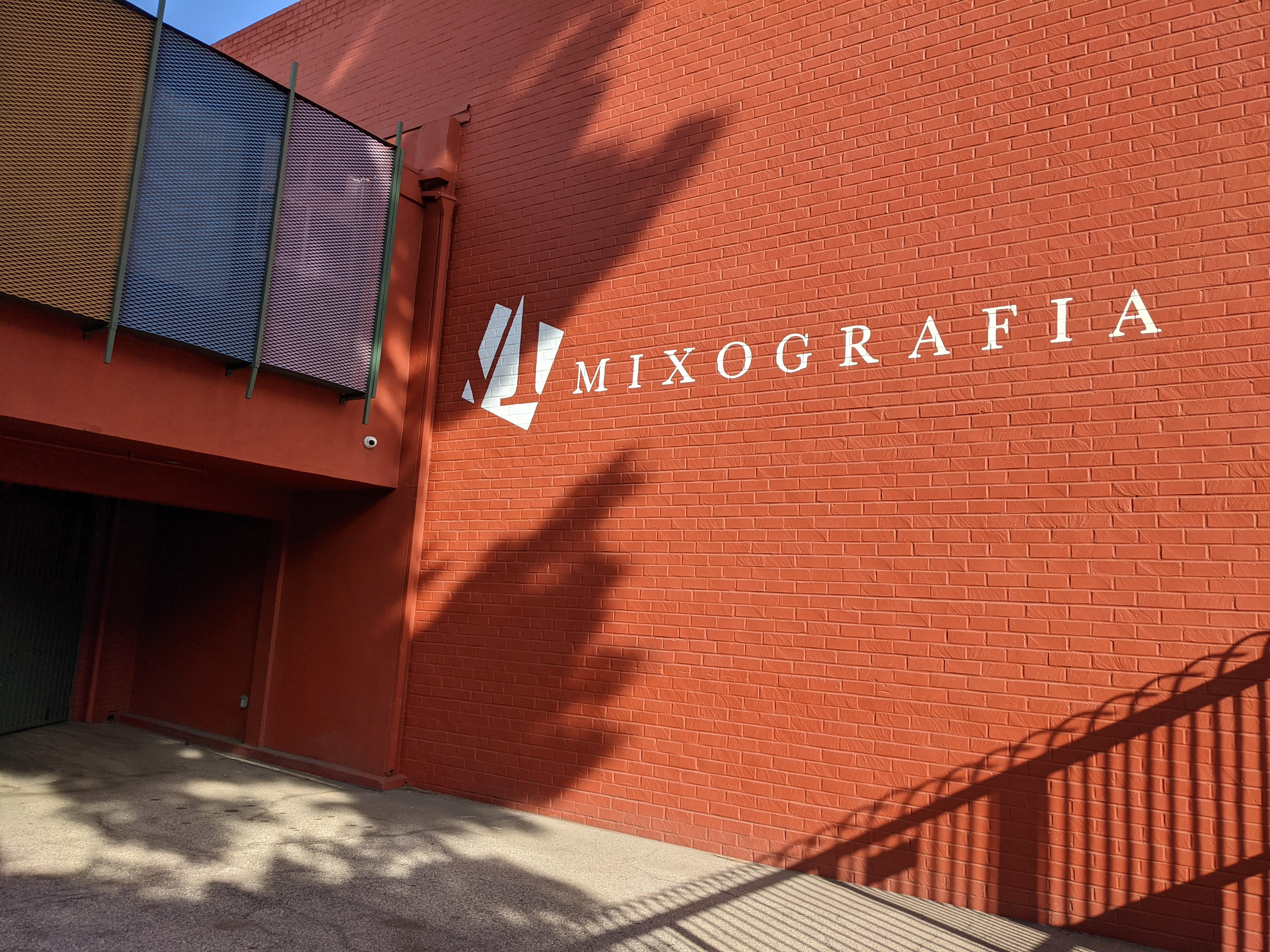
- Former name: Taller de Grafica Mexicana
- Established: 1969
- Type: Print workshop, Art gallery
- Founders: Luis Remba, Lea Remba
- Executive directors: Luis Remba, Lea Remba
- Director: Shaye Remba
- Website: mixografia.com

Mixografia is a publisher of fine art prints and a contemporary art gallery located in the Central-Alameda neighborhood southeast of Downtown Los Angeles. Mixografia also refers to the workshop's printing process of the same name, which involves the production of handmade paper editions that make use of three-dimensional relief and surface texture.

== History ==
=== Taller de Grafica Mexicana ===
Taller de Grafica Mexicana, later referred to as Mixografia, was established by Luis and Lea Remba in Plaza de Santo Domingo, Mexico City in 1968. Luis Remba obtained his knowledge of traditional printing processes working at his father Benito Remba's commercial letterpress and printing business in Mexico City, the Imprenta y Papelieria Santo Domingo. Benito Remba opened his printing business in 1949 after emigrating from Poland to Mexico City in 1924. In 1951, Luis Remba enrolled in the Instituto Politecnico Nacional to pursue a degree in mechanical engineering. In the mid-1960s, Remba inherited the business from his father.

Luis and Lea Remba were avid collectors of Pre-Columbian art objects, antiques, and other Mexican art. They began their endeavors into the production of fine art prints after purchasing the painting Escena Callejera by the painter Pablo O'Higgins. In the interest of restoring the paint surface after decades of wear, they connected with O'Higgins who was also a founding member of the printmaking collective known as Taller de Grafica Popular. O'Higgins had close associations with many prominent artists working in Mexico including, Luis Arenal, Leopoldo Mendez, Sarah Jimenez, Jose Clemente Orozco, and David Alfaro Siqueiros. O'Higgins sought the workshop's services to print an exhibition catalog for a retrospective of his work at the Instituto Nacional de Bellas Artes.

Following this initial collaboration, O'Higgins developed a suite of fine art lithographs with the printshop. At O'Higgins' suggestion upon completing these editions, Taller de Grafica Mexicana transitioned its operations toward the production of fine art prints. As they established their new facilities, the workshop developed roster of collaborative partnerships, publishing printed editions by artists including: Karel Appel, Leonora Carrington, Gunther Gerzso, and Rodolfo Morales.

=== Mixografia in Mexico City ===
In 1973, Taller de Grafica Mexicana approached the artist Rufino Tamayo with a proposition to create a series of lithographs. Tamayo agreed to create an edition with the workshop under certain conditions. Tamayo's primary interest was in achieving similar effects to those he employed in his paintings, noted for their heavy impasto and textured surfaces created through his use of non-traditional materials.

Though Tamayo was already experienced in the use of traditional print media, he sought to integrate textural effects into his printed artworks.

As the workshop advanced its processes to accommodate Tamayo's technical demands, the workshop along with Tamayo conceived of the term Mixografia, both as the workshop's new namesake and also to indicate the mixture of graphic processes used in the creation of the prints.

=== Mixografia in Los Angeles ===
From 1978 to 1981, Luis and Lea Remba operated a small gallery in Los Angeles, primarily to distribute Tamayo's prints to the American art market. In 1983, they connected with Robert H. Gray, dean of the department of fine arts at the University of California Los Angeles, who was developing an exhibition of Mixografia prints at UCLA's Wight Art Gallery.

In conjunction with the exhibition, Gray coordinated with the workshop to collaborate on projects with visiting artists. Luis and Lea Remba's son Shaye Remba opened and managed a second workshop in Los Angeles in order to carry out the production of these projects.

By 1990, the workshop ended its operations in Mexico City, and transitioned Mixografia's business and operations fully to Los Angeles. The workshop sought collaborations with artists whose own studio practices would be compatible with the Mixografia's methods.

Mixografia currently conducts all of its operations from its Central-Alameda workshop space. The workshop continues to publish editions by established and mid-career artists. Recent collaborations include editions by John Baldessari, Jacob Hashimoto, Alex Israel, Analia Saban, and Jonas Wood.

== Technique ==
Working with Rufino Tamayo on a new edition, the workshop developed the precursor to the Mixografia process. This process involved creating a sculptural maquette or collage from various materials, which was then cast in copper for use as a printing plate. For Tamayo's first Mixografia print using this method, an edition from 1974 entitled Monologo, the workshop attempted to create a lithograph using commercially available fine art printing paper manufactured by Arches.

The early experiments indicated that commercial paper had a tendency to tear and warp under pressure, due to the stress created by the textured surface of the printing plate. The workshop formulated a paper making technique that allowed for a degree of pliability due to the cotton pulp's high moisture content after being mixed into a slurry. The physical characteristics of the paper pulp allowed for a level of ink absorption that accommodated Rufino Tamayo's desired aesthetic outcome.

In 1979, Tamayo began developing his edition Dos Personajes Atacados por Perros, which the workshop completed in 1983. To create a print at Tamayo's intended scale, the workshop coordinated with a marble quarry in Mexico to obtain an unblemished stone measuring 60 x 97.5 inches, and prepared it using traditional lithographic techniques for the initial printing layer. The workshop fabricated a hoist apparatus and a custom press bed to accommodate the size of the print. After first making a lithographic impression, master printers then inked a textured cast copper printing plate to embed its inked and textured surface into the handmade paper in a second pass through the press.

Luis Remba, and later his son Shaye Remba, designed and developed numerous iterations of the workshop's printing and papermaking equipment.

The paper mill involves a series of containers and mixing devices that combine the dry cotton pulp with a liquid solution with alkaline buffering agents to create a semiliquid slurry. A master printer pours the solution into a deckle that has been built to the size of the edition, after which much of the water is drawn out to form a pliable yet semi-solid sheet of paper. The paper's high moisture content and loosely bonded fibers allow it to withstand the heavy pressure from the rolling press, in order to hold the form of the printing plate and its textured surface without tearing.

== Artists ==
- Raul Anguiano
- Karel Appel
- Arman
- John Baldessari
- Herbert Bayer
- Arnold Belkin
- Lynda Benglis
- Jonathan Borofsky
- Louise Bourgeois
- Alberto Burri
- Sonya Clark
- Leonora Carrington
- Francisco Corzas
- Olga Costa
- Abraham Cruzvillegas
- Dario Escobar
- Luis Filcer
- Helen Frankenthaler
- Pedro Friedeberg
- Gunther Gerzso
- Mathias Goeritz
- Joe Goode
- Robert Graham
- Peter Halley
- Jacob Hashimoto
- Alex Israel
- Kcho
- Magali Lara
- Donald Lipski
- Jason Martin
- Richard Meier
- Carlos Merida
- Guillermo Meza
- Henry Moore
- Jose Chavez Morado
- Rodolfo Morales
- Carlos Nakatani
- Rodolfo Nieto
- Luis Nishizawa
- Kenneth Noland
- Mimmo Paladino
- Jorge Pardo
- Park Seo-Bo
- Ed Paschke
- Fernando Garcia Ponce
- Fanny Rabel
- Larry Rivers
- Frank Romero
- Ed Ruscha
- Analia Saban
- Juliao Sarmento
- Fritz Scholder
- Sebastián
- George Segal
- Kiki Smith
- Pierre Soulages
- Frank Stella
- Donald Sultan
- Fernando de Szyszlo
- Rufino Tamayo
- William Tillyer
- Francisco Toledo
- Manolo Valdes
- Lawrence Weiner
- Tom Wesselmann
- Rachel Whiteread
- Terry Winters
- Jonas Wood
- Francisco Zúñiga
