= Aviation (disambiguation) =

Aviation refers to activities around mechanical flight.

Aviation may also refer to:

== Music ==
- Aviation (album), a 2014 alt rock album and song by Semi Precious Weapons
- "Aviation" (song), 2016, by The Last Shadow Puppets
- "Aviation", a song on Leo Sayer's 1984 album Have You Ever Been in Love
- Aviation, a 1976 instrumental album by R. Stevie Moore

== Other uses ==
- Aviation (painting), a 1934 painting by Rufino Tamayo
- Aviation (cocktail), an alcoholic drink
- Aviation Week & Space Technology (formerly Aviation), a periodical
- "Aviation", a Series A episode of the television series QI (2003)
