= Day and Night (painting) =

Mural by Rufino Tamayo in Mexico City, Mexico

- Spanish: El día y la noche
- Artist: Rufino Tamayo
- Year: 1954
- Medium: Vinylite on canvas mounted on particleboard
- Dimensions: 1190 cm × 207.4 cm (470 in × 81.7 in)
- Location: Museo Soumaya, Mexico City

Day and Night (Spanish: Día y noche) is a mural by Rufino Tamayo, painted using Vinylite resin on canvas and mounted on particleboard. As well as Still Life, it was originally created for the perfumes and pharmacy section of the Sanborns store on Lafragua Street in Mexico City. Since 2011 it has been displayed in the lobby of the Museo Soumaya.

== Description ==
Tamayo executed the work in 1954, employing the same technique used for the other murals in the Palacio de Bellas Artes (Palace of Fine Arts), The Birth of Our Nationality and Mexico of Today. The mural contains abstract elements associated with the cosmos and with Mesoamerican architecture, with chromatic contrasts of red and black. The work reflects Tamayo’s interest in space during the 1950s, as well as a growing involvement with Mexican history. It bears comparison with other Tamayo works such as Man Contemplating the Firmament and The Astronomer.

During an inaugural visit to the mural, Tamayo told the poet Carlos Pellicer that the original title was to be “Day and Night over the Pyramids of the Sun and the Moon,” to which Pellicer replied that it seemed the poet was Tamayo.

On the occasion of the celebrations of seventy years of artistic production by Tamayo, the mural was taken from its original setting and exhibited in the Palacio de Bellas Artes in Mexico City before travelling to Madrid, Moscow, and Oslo. It was then removed from the Sanborns on Lafragua, on the recommendation of art critic Raquel Tibol. It was restored to its original brilliance and moved to the Museo Soumaya at Plaza Loreto in 1994 and then to Plaza Carso in 2011.

== Bibliography ==
Rufino Tamayo, Maleries og Grafik, Oslo, 1989-1990 (Norwegian).
