= Naturaleza muerta (disambiguation) =

Naturaleza muerta refers to a work of art depicting inanimate subject matter.

Naturaleza muerta can also refer to:

- Naturaleza muerta, a 2003 film starring Hugo Stiglitz
- Naturaleza muerta, also known as Still Life, a 2014 Argentinian thriller film
- Naturaleza muerta con cachimba, a book by José Donoso
- Naturaleza muerta (Rosas), a painting by Frida Kahlo
- Naturaleza muerta, a 1954 painting by Rufino Tamayo
- Naturaleza Muerta, a 1956 painting by Pedro Coronel

== Music ==
- "Naturaleza Muerta", a song by Mecano, featured on their 1991 album Aidalai
- Naturaleza Muerta, a 2008 album by Argentinian hard rock band O'Connor
- Naturaleza muerta, a 2001 album by Spanish electronic pop duo Fangoria
- "Naturaleza muerta", a song by Gustavo Cerati, released on his album Fuerza natural
