= Three Characters =

1970 painting by Rufino Tamayo

Three Characters (Spanish: Tres Personajes, second version) is a painting by Mexican artist Rufino Tamayo, from 1970.

== Description ==
The brightly colored 51-by-38-inch (130 by 97 cm) painting is considered to be significant as an example of Tamayo's mature style. It is an abstract depiction of a man, a woman and an androgynous figure in a rich palette of purple, orange and yellow, with Tamayo's signature rough surface texture, made of sand and ground marble dust mixed into the paint. The artist died in 1991 at the age of 91.

== Theft and recovery ==
Tres Personajes was bought by a Houston man as a gift for his wife in 1977, then stolen from their storage locker in 1987 during a move. In 2003, Elizabeth Gibson found the painting in the trash on a New York City curb. Although she knew little about modern art, Gibson felt the painting "had a strange power" and took it without knowing its origin or market value. She spent four years trying to learn about the work, eventually learning from the PBS website that it had been featured on an episode of Antiques Roadshow. After seeing the Missing Masterpieces segment about Tres Personajes, Gibson contacted the former owner, who arranged to sell the painting at a Sotheby's auction. In November 2007 Gibson received a $15,000 reward plus a portion of the $1,049,000 auction sale price.
