= Two Bathers (Rufino Tamayo) =

Painting by Rufino Tamayo

Two Bathers was realized with the technique of tempera on paper and executed by Mexican painter Rufino Tamayo in 1934. It is on display in Museo Soumaya, in Mexico City.

== Description ==
His oeuvre is a reference to his muse Olga Tamayo. Both figures wear a bun that his wife used to wear frequently.

The skin color demonstrates their Indian heritage. The artist created a new narrative of Mexico and the femininity. The red tree creates a contrasting balance with the weight of the two female figures.

In 2016 the piece was displayed for the "ofrenda" [altar] for the Day of the Dead of Museo Soumaya.
