= Analia Saban =

Argentine artist (born 1980)

- Born: 1980 (age 45–46); Buenos Aires, Argentina
- Website: analiasabanstudio.com

Analia Saban (born 1980) is a contemporary conceptual artist who was born in Buenos Aires, Argentina, but is currently living in Los Angeles, California, United States. Her work takes traditional artistic media such as drawing, painting and sculpture and pushes their limits as a scientific experimentation with art making. Because of her pushing the limits with different forms of art, Saban has taken the line that separated the different art forms and merged them together.

== Biography ==
Analia Saban was born and grew up in Buenos Aires, Argentina. She earned her B.F.A. in Visual Arts from Loyola University New Orleans in the year of 2001 and her M.F.A. in New Genres from UCLA in 2005. She studied under the artist John Baldessari and was a Research Institute Artist in Residency at the Getty Museum, Los Angeles, from 2015 to 2016. She currently resides and works in the city of Los Angeles in the United States. Her artwork is featured in many art museums across the country as well as around the world.

== Solo exhibitions ==
- 2005: Bit by Bit, Kim Light Gallery / LightBox Gallery (Inaugural Exhibition), Los Angeles, CA
- 2007: Wet Paintings in the Womb, Galerie Sprüth Magers Projekte, Munich, Germany
- 2007: When things collapse, Praz-Delavallade, Paris, France
- 2009: Living Color, Praz-Delavallade, Paris, France
- 2009: Light Breaks Out of Prism, Thomas Solomon Gallery, Los Angeles, CA
- 2010: Information Leaks, Josh Lilley Gallery, London
- 2010: Froing and Toing, Light and Wire Gallery, Los Angeles, CA
- 2011: Grayscale, Thomas Solomon Gallery, Los Angeles, CA
- 2011: Dig, Praz-Delavallade, Paris, France
- 2011: Derrames, 11x7 Galeria, Buenos Aires
- 2012: Gag, Tanya Bonakdar Gallery, New York
- 2013: Datum, Josh Lilley Gallery, London
- 2013: Bathroom Sink, etc., Sprüth Magers, Berlin
- 2014: Outburst, Galerie Praz-Delavallade, Paris, France
- 2015: Backyard, Tanya Bonakdar Gallery, New York
- 2015: Interiors, Galerie Sprüth Magers, London
- 2016: Paper or Plastic, Mixografia, Los Angeles, CA
- 2016: Analia Saban, Blaffer Art Museum, University of Houston, Houston, TX
- 2016: Analia Saban Is Broken, Gemini G.E.L., Los Angeles, CA
- 2017: The Warp and Woof of Painting, Galerie Praz-Delavallade, Paris, France
- 2017: Folds and Faults, Galerie Sprüth Magers, Los Angeles, CA
- 2017: Pigmente, Galerie Sprüth Magers, Berlin, Germany
- 2017: Canvas on Paint, Qiao Space, Shanghai
- 2017: Where We Start From, Gemini G.E.L., Los Angeles, CA
- 2018: Punched Card, Tanya Bonakdar Gallery, New York
- 2019: FOCUS: Analia Saban, Modern Art Museum of Fort Worth, Texas
- 2019: Particle Theory Arario Gallery, Seoul, South Korea
- 2019: Analia Saban: Dry Clean Only, Mixografia, Los Angeles
- 2021: Save As, Galerie Sprüth Magers, Berlin, Germany
- 2022: Quantifiable, Galerie Praz-Delavallade, Paris, France

In 2014, Saban participated in a group exhibition at the National Museum of Norway in Oslo.

== Other exhibitions ==
- 2011: Painting Expanded, Tanya Bonakdar Gallery, New York
- 2012: Hammer Biennial: Made in LA, Hammer Museum, Los Angeles
- 2012: Analia Saban: Gag, Tanya Bonakdar Gallery, New York
- 2014: Between the Lines, Tanya Bonakdar Gallery, New York
- 2014: ADAA Art Show, Park Avenue Armory, New York
- 2015: Analia Saban: Backyard, Tanya Bonakdar Gallery, New York
- 2017: Analia Saban, Blaffer Art Museum, University of Houston
- 2018: Analia Saban: Punched Card, Tanya Bonakdar Gallery, New York
- 2019: Analia Saban: Focus, Modern Art Museum of Fort Worth, TX
- 2020: Songs in the Dark, Tanya Bonakdar Gallery, New York
- 2020: The Return of the Real, Tanya Bonakdar Gallery, New York
- 2020: Restless Index, Curated by Kelly Akashi and Cayetano Ferrer, Tanya Bonakdar Gallery, Los Angeles
- 2020: Teaching a Cow How to Draw, The Clark Art Institute, Williamstown, MA
- 2021: Analia Saban: View Count, Tanya Bonakdar Gallery, New York
- 2021: IRL, Tanya Bonakdar Gallery, New York
- 2024: Woven Histories: Textiles and Modern Abstraction, National Gallery of Art, Washington, DC

== Lectures and panel discussions ==
- 2021: Artist's Choice: Analia Saban and Bill Fox in Conversation, June 10, The Clark, MA (virtual event)
- 2021: OnWeaving Final Review Committee, May 7, UPENN, PE (virtual event)
- 2021: Art + Materiality: Analia Saban, Andrea Chung, Alex Olson, moderated by Lindsay Preston Zappas, May 6, Venice Family Clinic, CA (virtual event)
- 2021: OnWeaving Final Review Committee, April 22, SCI-Arc, Los Angeles, CA (virtual event)
- 2021: Analia Saban in Conversation with Jo Applin and Pia Gottschaller, March 5, The Courtauld, London (virtual event)
- 2020: Thesis Reviews, Spring / Fall, SCI-Arc, Los Angeles, CA
- 2019: Artist Lecture, The Modern Art Museum, March 26, Fort Worth, TX
- 2019: Artists on Art Lecture, Study Center for Photography and Works on Paper, LACMA, February 23, Los Angeles, CA
- 2018: Vertical Studio Reviews, Prof. Florencia Pita, Sci-Arc, Spring Semester, Los Angeles, CA
- 2018: UCI Claire Trevor School of the Arts, Visiting Artist, February 8, Irvine, CA
- 2017: CSU Bakersfield, Art Department Visiting Artist, October 25, Bakersfield, CA
- 2017: CSU Long Beach, Art Department Visiting Artist Lecture, October 10, Long Beach, CA
- 2017: Analia Saban and Selene Preciado in Conversation, October 5, Art + Practice, Los Angeles, CA
- 2017: University of Nevada, Las Vegas – Art Department Visiting Artist, September 7, Las Vegas, NV
- 2017: Artists on Artists: Analia Saban on Anna Maria Maiolino, August 13, Museum of Contemporary Art, Los Angeles, CA
- 2017: The Histories and Uses of Materials: Nina Beier, Analia Saban, and Kaari Upson with respondent Ruba Katrib, Curated by Alex Bacon. Helen Frankenthaler Foundation, April 26, New York, NY
- 2017: Urban Ecology and Archeology in Contemporary Art Practice: Mark Hagen, Analia Saban, and Anna Sew Hoy, LACMA, March 20, Los Angeles, CA
- 2016: University of Houston, Graduate Art Department Visiting Artist, November 3, Houston, TX
- 2016: Artists in Conversation: NO MAN'S LAND, National Museum of Women in the Arts, November 11, Washington, DC
- 2016: Gallery Talk: Analia Saban. Blaffer Museum, September 23, 2016, University of Houston, TX
- 2016: LA Print Edition 6: Lecture with Analia Saban. LACMA, March 15, Los Angeles, CA
