= Jacob Hashimoto =

American artist (born 1973)

- Born: 1973 (age 52–53); Greeley, Colorado, U.S.
- Education: School of the Art Institute of Chicago
- Alma mater: Carleton College
- Known for: Modular installations using bamboo-and-paper kites and 3-D "Waterblocks" sculptures
- Style: Landscape-based abstraction, modernism

Jacob Hashimoto (born 1973) is an American artist based in New York City. Using sculpture, painting, and installation, Hashimoto creates complex worlds from a range of modular components: bamboo-and-paper kites, model boats, even astroturf-covered blocks. His accretive, layered compositions reference video games, virtual environments, and cosmology, while also remaining deeply rooted in art-historical traditions notably, landscape-based abstraction, modernism, and handcraft.

== Early life and education ==
Hashimoto was born in Greeley, Colorado. Much of his work materials reflect traditional Japanese culture. Despite his strong ties to the culture, however, he has not been to Japan and does not speak the language. His connection instead comes from his Japanese-American father. His mother, on the other hand, is Irish-American.

Hashimoto grew up in Walla Walla, Washington, where his mother, who had studied art as a college student, had her own studio. Although he enjoyed drawing and creating art in her studio, he did not plan to pursue an art degree in college. During his second year at Carleton College, he took a printmaking class, changed his mind about his career, and decided to send an application to the School of the Art Institute of Chicago. After his acceptance, he returned home to paint and work in the studio of Keiko Hara for a year before returning to school.

It was during his senior year at the School of the Art Institute of Chicago that he began to make the kites that would appear in much of his later work. This initial experience with the kites created a means for him to shift from his position as a college student to a real-world artist.

== Career ==
Hashimoto’s career began with exhibitions designed for galleries and has since shown work internationally in many exhibitions including The Nature of Objects at Studio la Città in Verona, Black Sea at XIV Quadriennale di Roma at Galleria Nazionale d'Arte Moderna in Rome, Made in California NOW at the Mary Boone Gallery in New York and has had The Dark Isn't The Thing To Worry About and In the Cosmic Fugue at the Rhona Hoffman Gallery in Chicago.

After graduating college, Hashimoto began working as a preparator in the Ann Nathan Gallery which allowed him to continue pursuing his personal art at night. On Thanksgiving weekend, he was allowed to set up his first kite exhibit in the gallery in order for the piece to be photographed. After which, Nathan encouraged him to leave it up as a public exhibit. Upon viewing the installation, the chief curator of the Museum of Contemporary Art, Richard Francis, approached Hashimoto with an offer to display works in the cafe at the MoCA. Hashimoto completed the exhibition with the aid of many family members and friends. The massive collection of 15,000 kites was displayed for 18 months.

In 2013 the installation Superabundant Atmosphere was presented at Bildmuseet, Umeå University, Sweden, to run from June 2, 2013 until October 13, 2013.

== Techniques ==
=== Kites ===
Because his pieces are produced from a vast number of kites, Hashimoto enlists the help of various assistants from friends to employed workers. When it comes to the designs these assistants collage each kite, he places little restrictions on their creativity. Hashimoto must then find a way to incorporate each kite into his piece in a way that still speaks to his personal style and artistic values. This method of construction often forces him to solve unexpected formal issues and to explore ideas he would not normally encounter.

As far as idealizing his installations is concerned, Hashimoto relates his methods to those of a painter. He mainly follows his intuition, allowing the paper to respond to the ideas he generates in his head and the emotions he wishes to communicate through his work.

The paper Hashimoto uses for his kites is manufactured in Japan by four or five specific paper mills. Without this paper, it would be difficult to produce the effects he strives to create in his work (such as opacity, transparency, and diverse color) as paper made in the United States does not exhibit the same qualities. When collaging with this paper, he uses a variety of papers such as natural fiber paper, rayon, and Washi paper.

=== Waterblocks ===
Waterblocks is the name Hashimoto has given to his 3-D wave-like sculptures. Using a 3-D computer program, he creates these acrylic glass sculptures by altering, layering, and combining different blocks. The blocks are then arranged on the floor in a grid format, replicating the movement of water that has been frozen in this seemingly fragile form. The way in which he layers and arranges the forms is similar to how he works with his kites and also resembles the manipulation of clay.

== Exhibitions ==
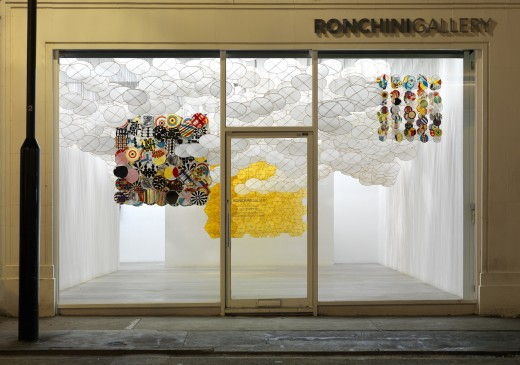
Hashimoto's exhibit in the Ronchini Gallery.

Hashimoto's exhibits display his numerous paper kites and sometimes other mediums as well. The paper kites hang from the ceiling and vary in layers, anywhere from six kites deep to the entire length of the gallery. His collections of hundreds to thousands of kites are made from both colored and white paper. Although Hashimoto claims his work to be abstract and without narrative, he admits that his installations often reference various landscapes. Hashimoto's work has been featured in museums such as MOCA Pacific Design Centre in Los Angeles, MACRO in Roma and Museum of Art in California.

=== Landscapes of Vision ===
This exhibit is a large collection of pieces that all represent nature, some intentionally more abstract than others. One piece, created in 2008, is a wooden tree, Tree III, that holds giant white balls of light in place of leaves. The design is intended to resemble growing technology and children's playground equipment. The original idea was to hang 700 smaller balls of light from the ceiling that would place the viewer in a digital reality. Hashimoto had the goal of making a sculpture that was both digital and physical. But, to better approach the space at Studio La Città, a wooden tree was made. The idea of a tree came from images of trees that were dotted with paper prayers in the branches. A tree that became sacred while representing the influence of the digital world in American society, especially American children, was the position Hashimoto was aiming for.

Another part of this exhibit was a giant two-dimensional piece against the wall, made in 2008, named Diving Deep and Surfacing. This piece is built up with layers and layers of grass that appear artificial. Hashimoto admits that this piece came from inspiration from his previous exhibits. The grass had been applied to his many kite exhibits, but he had never attached the grass to a simple square shape before this exhibit. The ground approaching this piece is covered in a black sculpture. These black acrylic bases, called Gun Metal Blue Waves, also made in 2008, are designed based on ocean waves. Pushing the limits between digital and organic creations, Hashimoto created an organic sculpture from a mass digital creation. The black color is intended to force the viewer to notice the waves, despite the non-naturalistic colors.

A third room in the exhibit held the piece Infinite Expanse of Sky and Superabundant Atmosphere. Both of these works have been exhibited together previously. Infinite Expanse of Sky is a collection of rectangle kites that are blue with white clouds drawn on them. The original sculpture was created in 1998. Superabundant Atmosphere is a collection of white, oval kites. This piece was started originally exhibited in 2005. The slight variations between different exhibit locations include increasing the length and decreasing the width of the experience and placing the two pieces next to each other with the blue kites on the left and the white kites on the right. A bench was added at the front of the room. The seat gives the vantage point that Hashimoto determined is the most ideal for viewing the entirety of the piece. The kites are well above the viewer's head at the entrance of the room, but as the piece extends further back, the kites gradually become lower, until they hit the floor.

Other, more 2-dimensional kite works that were displayed in the Landscapes of Vision exhibit included Hodge Podge, 2008; Grassscape, 2008; Descending Yellow Halo, 2008; Field of Green Blocks, 2008; Water for Elephants, 2008; Superliner, 2007; Velocity of Desire, 2008; Redshroom, 2008; Field of Yellow Blocks, 2009; Odds and Ends, 2008; Far Rockaway, 2009; and The Return, 2009. There were also several rectangle paintings on paper and linen. These included Vapors and Night Skies, 2008; Inverted Night Reflection, 2008; Single Black Cloud, 2008; Some Things You Can't Ignore, 2008; and Cyclone and the Wonder Wheel, 2008. Of the painted pieces, all were done in acrylic. The first four listed are in all painted in greyscale. Cyclone and the Wonder Wheel is the only acrylic piece made with multiple colors.

=== Gas Giant ===
This exhibit is made to be set up in two separate rooms. The first room consists of mostly black and white elements and is designed to lead the viewer into the second room. The second room is the focal point of the exhibit. An entire environment is created with the hanging paper kites. Square pieces with grass glued on collect in one corner. White, oval kites start low and lead the eye towards the ceiling where there is a multitude of shapes forming out of colorful kites. The exhibit was displayed a total of three times starting in 2012 at the Rhona Hoffman Gallery in Chicago. It was then moved to the Fondazione Querini Stampalia and finally the MOCA Pacific Design Center.

== Influences ==
Hashimoto claims that the idea that a piece can fully surround the viewer while maintaining some form of two-dimensionality comes from pieces made by Mark Rothko. Staring at a Rothko piece gave the idea of standing in a literal field of color and Hashimoto wanted to replicate that.

Although Oriental influence appears frequently in his work, Hashimoto claims to be affected by other elements as well. For example, during his time at school, much of his work reflected the styles of Robert Ryman and Agnes Martin and he adopted the strict grid format from both artists.

Inspired by Jessica Stockholder and Ann Hamilton's ability to turn a painting into a sculpture, Hashimoto took the first steps to surrounding and involving the viewer directly.
