= Museo Rufino Tamayo, Mexico City =

Art museum in Mexico City, Mexico

Museo Tamayo Arte Contemporáneo
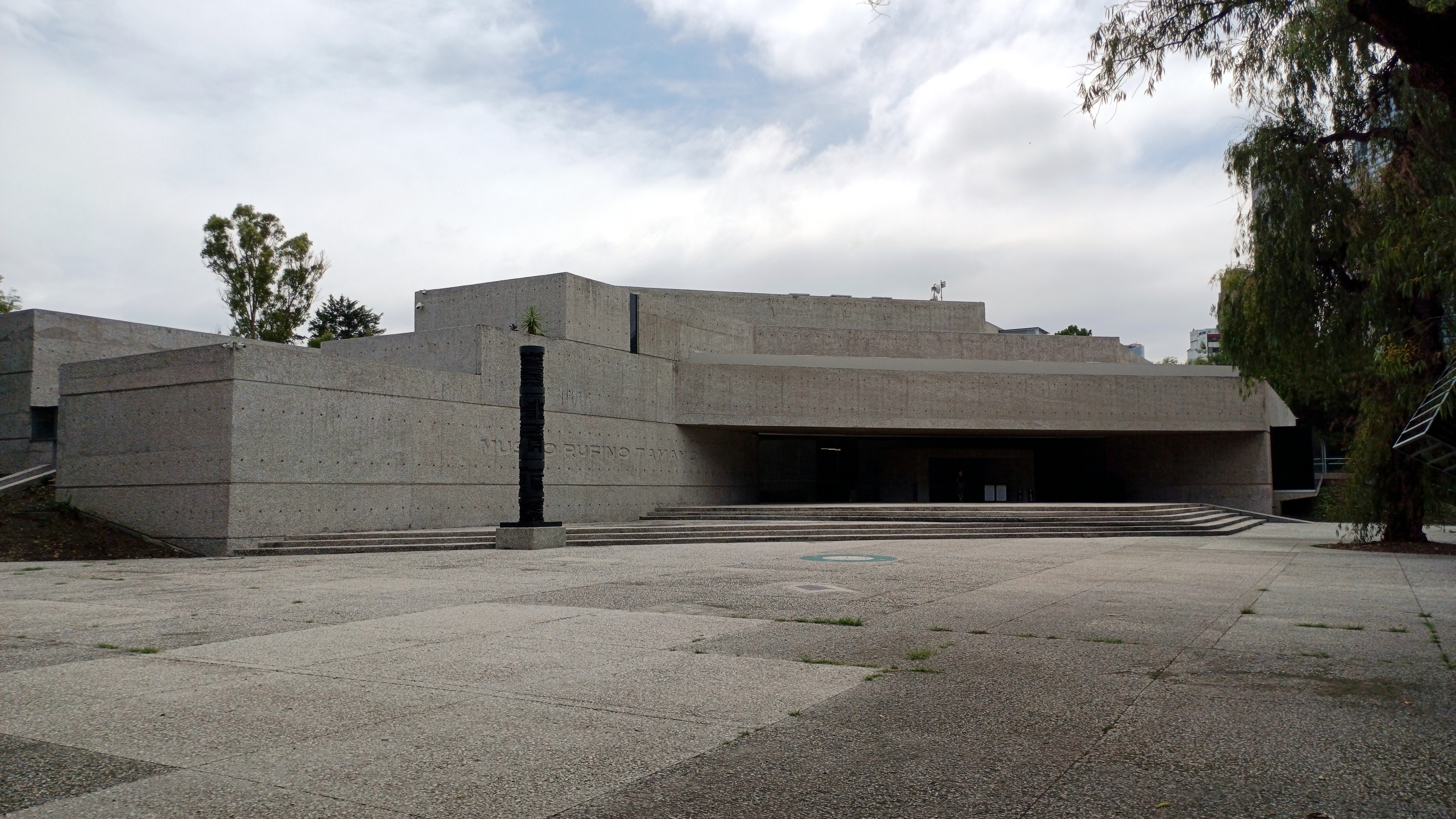
- Entrance to the museum
- Location in Mexico City
- Established: May 29, 1981; 45 years ago
- Location: Paseo de la Reforma 51 Bosque de Chapultepec Mexico, MX 11580
- Coordinates: 19.42572°N 99.181716°W
- Director: Magalí Arriola
- Website: www.museotamayo.org

Museo Rufino Tamayo is a public contemporary art museum located in Mexico City's Chapultepec Park, that produces contemporary art exhibitions, using its collection of modern and contemporary art, as well as artworks from the collection of its founder, the artist Rufino Tamayo.

The museum building was designed by Mexican architects Teodoro González de León and Abraham Zabludovsky. Both received the National Award of Science and Art, in the "Fine Arts" in 1982 for their design.

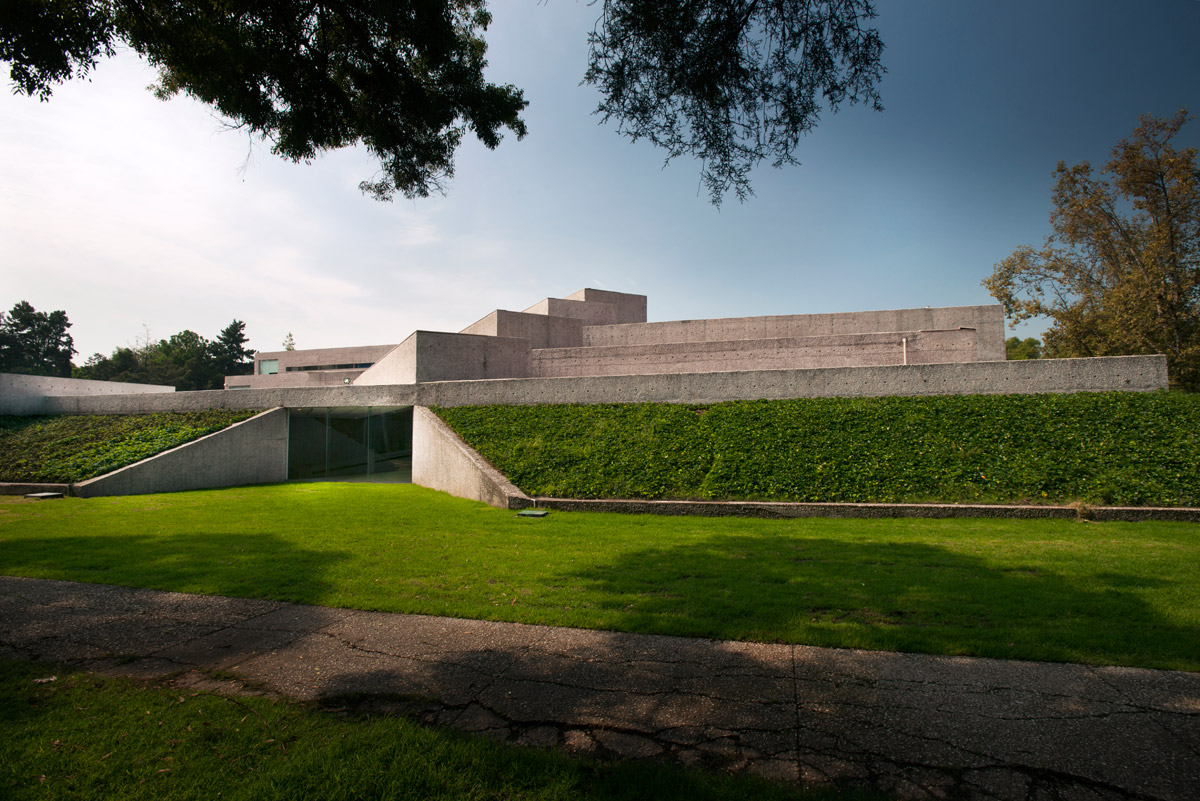
Museo Tamayo - architecture

== Collection ==
The museum's collection is divided in two groups: the modern fund which was collected mostly by Olga and Rufino Tamayo, and a contemporary fund that was created in the 1990s and that has been expanded continuously thanks to the donations of artists that have exhibited in the museum and other commissioned artworks.

The modern collection is striking for the list of major artists represented in it: Pablo Picasso, Joan Miró, Francis Bacon, Jean Dubuffet, Fernand Léger, Wifredo Lam, Pierre Soulages, Frank Auerbach, Alexander Calder, Eduardo Chillida, Salvador Dalí, Max Ernst, Josep Guinovart, Barbara Hepworth, Hans Hartung, Willem de Kooning, Roy Lichtenstein, René Magritte, Manolo Millares, Robert Motherwell, Georgia O´Keeffe, Arnaldo Pomodoro, Mark Rothko, Antoni Tàpies, Joaquín Torres García, Victor Vasarely, Andy Warhol, among others.

Museo Tamayo also holds a contemporary art collection including works of artists such as: Francis Alÿs, Carlos Amorales, Abraham Cruzvillegas, Haris Epaminonda, Alex Katz, Beom Kim, Jack Leirner, Liliana Porter, Pedro Reyes, Melanie Smith, Monika Sosnowska, Simon Starling, Wolfgang Tillmans, Pablo Vargas Lugo, among others.

== See also ==
- List of single-artist museums
- Museo Rufino Tamayo, Oaxaca
- List of Brutalist structures
