= Aviation (painting) =

1934 painting by Rufino Tamayo

Aviation, Rufino Tamayo, 1934

Aviation (Spanish: Aviación) is a 1934 painting by Rufino Tamayo. The work consists of gouache on paper. The piece now resides in the collection of Latin American Artists of Museo Soumaya, in Mexico City.

== History ==
Of his work, Tamayo said: “I am interested in Men, Man is my subject, Man who is creator of all scientific and technological wonders. To me that is the most important thing in existence” Aviation was a reoccurring theme of Tamayo's work. In 1938, he painted another work entitled Aviation, featuring airplanes flying over power lines and a town, against a grey sky. In 1946, Tomayo painted Nude Figures Watching Airplanes (Hombre Asombrado de la Aviacion), utilizing a similarly desaturated palette against another grey sky.

== Description ==
The work depicts the first functional airplane. In the foreground, on a balcony, Americans Orville and Wilbur Wright appear on the right side, with Brazilian Alberto Santos-Dumont on the left. The Wright Brothers appear with their arms outstretched, rejoicing. Santos-Dumont sits on a large boulder, silently. In the painting, it is night, and moonlit clouds encircle the airplane. The painting uses primarily dark, desaturated, blue-grey colors.

The painting was exhibited at the Galería de Arte Mexicano (GAM) [Mexican Art Gallery] during the Exhibition of Paintings Rufino Tamayo in 1935 and The Dallas Museum of Art (DMA) in Three Contemporary Mexican Artists in 1948, exhibition by Diego Rivera, David Alfaro Siqueiros, and Rufino Tamayo.

== Bibliography ==
- Interpreter of the Southwest, Jerry Bywaters, at SMU's Meadows Museum of Art, November 30, 2007 - February 24, 2008
