= Museo Rufino Tamayo, Oaxaca =

Art museum in Oaxaca, southern Mexico

Coordinates: 17.0635°N 96.7270°W

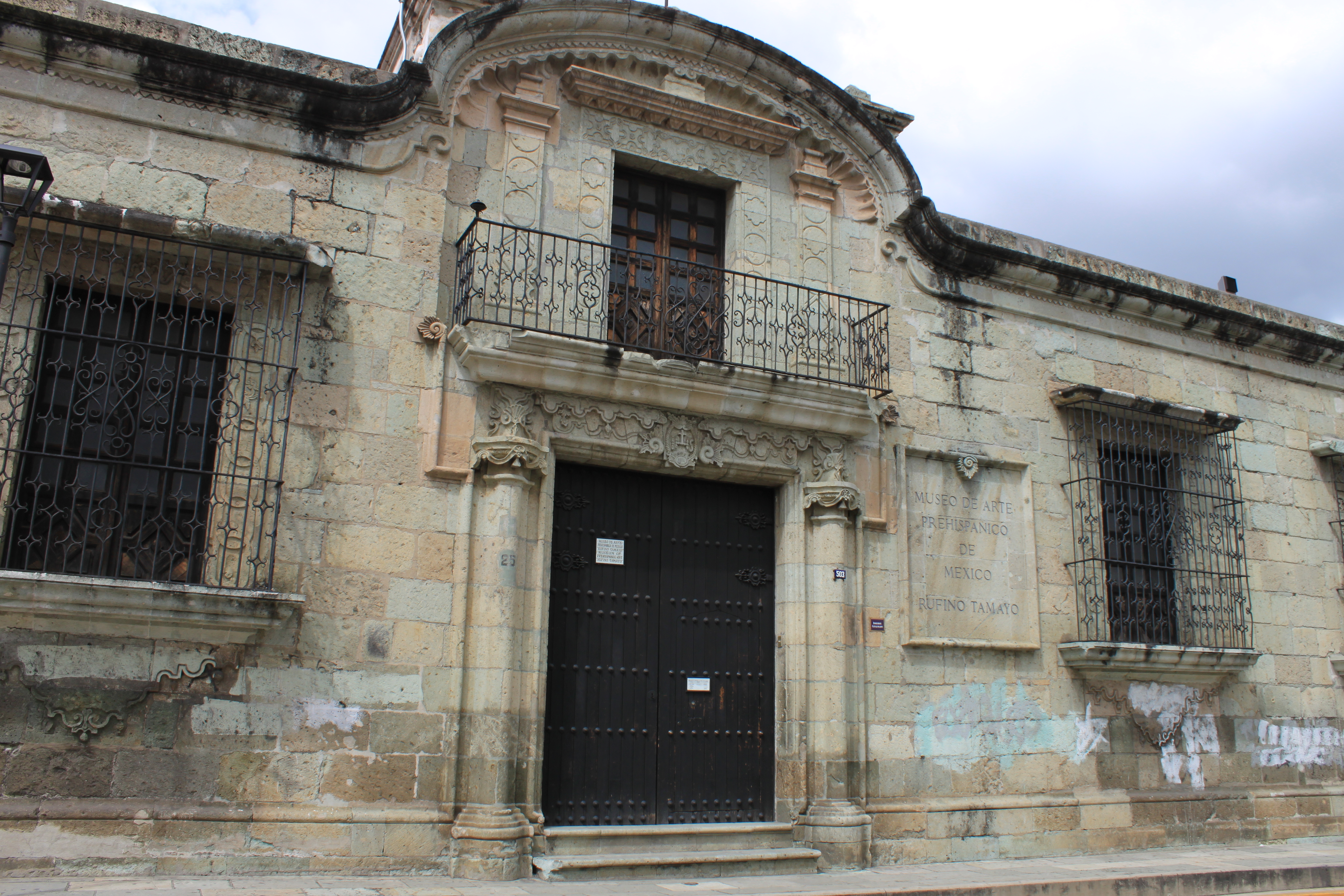
The Rufino Tamayo Museum of Pre-Hispanic Art

The Museo Rufino Tamayo is an art museum in the city of Oaxaca, Oaxaca, in southern Mexico.

== Description ==
The museum contains collections of pre-Columbian art once owned by artist Rufino Tamayo. It is housed in a colonial-style building. The displays are arranged according to aesthetic themes.

One of the chief purposes of Tamayo and the museum was to collect the historic pieces, and to protect them from entering the illegal artifact traders market. Tamayo left the museum to his native state of Oaxaca, for his fellow Mexicans awareness of their rich cultural heritage.

== See also ==
- Museo Rufino Tamayo — houses the modern art collection of Rufino Tamayo, in Mexico City.
