= Still Life (Rufino Tamayo) =

1954 mural by Rufino Tamayo

Still life
- Spanish: Naturaleza muerta
- Artist: Rufino Tamayo
- Year: 1954
- Medium: Vinylite
- Dimensions: 198 cm × 854.5 cm (78 in × 336.4 in)
- Location: Museo Soumaya, Mexico City

Still Life is a mural executed by Rufino Tamayo in 1954. It is on permanent display at the Museo Soumaya.Fundación Carlos Slim in Plaza Carso, Mexico City, Mexico.

== History ==
Still Life (1954) belongs to Tamayo’s most prolific period. It exemplifies the handling of color that is characteristic of his work. The rich tradition of still life painting in Mexico was not only continued, but also developed into a more modern form, culminating in the characteristic watermelon paintings produced by Rufino Tamayo in the course of his entire career. Still lifes and studies of fruits and foodstuffs have served many generations of artists as a basis for studying composition and the interrelation of volumes, textures, colors, light, and shadow.

In the twentieth-century Mexico, Tamayo, like Paul Cézanne in fin-de-siècle Paris, brought this genre to one of its most complex and beautiful expressions. Both painters eschewed experimentation and sought the combination of different objects, or rather of their forms: apples, for Cézanne; watermelons, for Tamayo. For both artists, the forms were more important than the systematic study of the fruits themselves. Tamayo painted two mural for Sanborns to decorate the building acquired by the company in 1954, located on the Calle José María Lafragua at the corner of Paseo de la Reforma in central Mexico City.

Still Life was intended to decorate the elegant restaurant room of the Sanborns chain, where the spectacular color contrasts of the mural could be enjoyed by diners.

For thirty-two years, the watermelons stayed in the same place, until in 1986, at the invitation of the Instituto Nacional de Bellas Artes (INBA), the mural was included in an exhibition organized as a national homage to Tamayo for seventy years of artistic creation. It was removed by the staff of the Centro Nacional de Conservación y Registro del Patrimonio Artístico Mueble of the INBA. When it was cleaned, the thick layer of grease attracted the attention of the restorers. The waiters at the restaurant explained that, when they used to clean the tables, they often gave the mural a wipe as well, in case it had gotten splattered. Unexpectedly, the layer of grease had protected the original colors. When it was cleaned, the brilliance of the original colors led Tamayo himself to confirm: “Yes, those are my colors.”

== Description ==
The mural was painted on seven sheets of hardboard attached to the wall by means of a wooden frame. It was executed with pigments, the most modern material, suited to the technical and esthetic aims Tamayo wished to achieve.

The painting depicts an angled table piled with red, round fruits, two bottles on a tray, and twelve slices of watermelon. In the foreground, the tops of the backs of two wrought-iron chairs can be seen, evoking the presence of the couple invited to enjoy the wine and fruit which, opulent and radiant, awaits the banquet.

The fruits and objects, arranged in no order, are scattered over the table which, by its placement, recall the tables painted in Tamayo’s cubist period. The tapering angles toward the back lend a sensation of instability to the fruits resting on the table. These strike a point of balance, however, with the light emanating from a source outside of the composition, at the upper left corner. The position of the table, the outside light source, and the singular semicircular shape of the work, intended to be seen from below by seated diners, were all conceived originally by Tamayo as part of the mural composition. The sober and elegant coloring is limited to four tones: red, blue, green, and black. The ranges within these colors are carried, however, to their maximum potential, though it is the red of the apples and watermelons that predominate. The discreet greyish and whitish blue of the tray and bottles underlines the force of the red and white and helps to set off the gamut of reds and pinks of the slices of watermelon and the luminous red of the apples, which range from a vivid brilliance to a darker, blackish tone.

The time when Tamayo was producing the greater part of his work coincided with a series of important social and cultural changes in Mexico, often reflected in mural paintings. Unlike the great masters of muralism, however, Tamayo sought to recover his Mexican roots without championing ideological stances or political movements. In short, his work expresses a universal vision.

== Other exhibitions ==
This piece was exhibited at the Museo Reina Sofía in the solo exposition Rufino Tamayo Pinturas in 1988.

== Bibliography ==
- Catalogue: Rufino Tamayo, Pinturas, Centro de Arte Reina Sofía, Ministerio de la Cultura, Madrid, 1992
