= Still Life (2014 film) =

- Film poster
- Naturaleza muerta
- Directed by: Gabriel Grieco
- Written by: Gabriel Grieco
- Starring: Sabrina Carballo; Luz Cipriota; Ezequiel De Almeida
- Cinematography: Mariano Suarez
- Edited by: Juan Zavalla
- Music by: Pablo Vostrouski
- Production companies: Estudios CREPUSCULUM; Yomka Pictures
- Distributed by: Clarovideo - DLA (Latin America)
- Release date: October 7, 2014 (Sitges Film Festival)
- Running time: 98 minutes
- Country: Argentina
- Language: Spanish

Still Life, originally released in Argentina and Spain under the title Naturaleza muerta, is a Spanish language thriller film and the feature film directorial debut of Gabriel Grieco. The movie had its world premiere on 7 October 2014 at the Sitges Film Festival and stars Luz Cipriota as a journalist whose devotion to her craft has placed her life in danger. In 2013 an unfinished version of the film was one of two films that were given a Bloody Work in Progress Award by the Ventana Sur film festival, which secured distribution rights for DVD, VOD and pay tv for Mexican territory.

== Synopsis ==
Jazmín (Luz Cipriota) is an intrepid young reporter that decides to investigate the disappearance of the daughter of a wealthy cattle businessman. She soon finds that this disappearance is more than what it seems, as it is related to multiple murders and the resulting story has the potential to give Jazmín a name in the reporting world. As she delves deeper and deeper into the mystery she also brings herself and her cameraman closer to danger, as someone or someones do not want their activities to be uncovered.

== Cast ==
- Luz Cipriota as Jazmín Alsina
- Amin Yoma as Dan
- Nicolás Pauls as Gerardo Basavilbaso
- Juan Palomino as Miguel Kraezawer
- Nicolás Maiques as Joaquín González
- Ezequiel De Almeida as Diego
- Mercedes Oviedo as Julia Cotonese
- Néstor Sánchez como José Aymar
- Verónica Pelaccini as Juliana
- Sabrina Carballo as News reporter
- Berta Muñiz as José
- Patricio Sardelli as Raúl Cotonese
- Cristian "Toti" Iglesias as himself
- Walter Leiva as himself

== Development ==
Grieco stated that he was inspired to create Still Life after watching an Anima Naturalis television spot that focused on animal rights NGOs. He stated that he then began to view footage of cruelty inflicted on food animals, which he felt was a double standard because while the cruelty existed it did not deter consumer purchasing rates and seemed to Grieco as if the cruelty was deliberately being ignored. Grieco filmed the movie on a limited budget and actress Cipriota stated that this aspect was part of what drew her to the film.

== Reception ==
Bloody Disgusting gave Still Life 3.5 out of 5 skulls, writing that while most of the film- particularly its opening prologue- was extremely powerful, the film's epilogue was "so painfully contrived and farcical that it shirks off the previous 90 minutes and dives headfirst into laughable slasher territory."
