= Still Life (1970s UK band) =

English progressive rock band

Still Life was an English progressive rock band characterized by expert Hammond organ playing, intricate and original vocal harmonies, and an agile and precise rhythm section. They had one self-titled album that was originally released in 1971, and later re-released in 2003. The album credits kept an aura of mystery about their membership. Martin Cure, Graham Amos, Terry Howells and Alan Savage were actually involved.

== Career ==
Bassist Graham Amos and vocalist Martin Cure began their musical experience in 1963 in a Coventry based band called The Sabres. They later formed The Peeps in 1965. The other two members of the band were Roy Albrighton (guitar) and Paul Wilkinson (drums). The Peeps recorded five SPs for Philips Records (1966–68). In 1968, they recruited Terry Howells on organ (ex-Ray King Soul Band). Their drummer, P. Wilkinson, left the band in 1968 (he joined a band called Flying Machine). With a new drummer, Gordon Reed (ex-Vampires), the group's name was changed to Rainbows. They recorded two singles for CBS Records. The Rainbows also had some gigs in Hamburg, Germany, and when they were finished there their guitarist, R. Albrighton, decided to stay in Germany (later, he formed a band called Nektar). When Rainbows came back to England, Reed left the band. The three remaining musicians: Amos, Cure, and Howells, changed a band name to Still Life. Alan Savage was recruited at short notice prior to the new line-up recording their debut album. It was recorded at Nova Sound Recording Studios, near Marble Arch, London.

Savage was involved with the recording on the following dates: 1, 2, 5, 6 and 13 October 1970. The album was mixed on 26 October. Stephen Shane produced the album, which was released through Vertigo Records. The Allmusic journalist, Richie Unterberger, noted "The record was early organ-dominated progressive rock, its lyrical themes dwelling upon uneasy doubt and sadness, the melodies colored with the gothic classicism prevalent in much of the genre during the period". The band had a recording contract to produce six such albums, but they drifted apart.

== After the split ==
Amos was living in England, but he died in June 2003. Howells now lives in Switzerland, and in April 2012 recorded a solo album, Tangerine Puddles. The album is solo piano, with all composition by Howells. Savage lives in Northampton, and still plays the drums. Martin Cure joined Cupid's Inspiration in 1971, and in 1980, he and his friends from Cupid's Inspiration formed a group called Chevy. In 1981, they had a record deal with Avatar Records and recorded one album and three singles. In 1983, Cure played with the group Red on Red. He now has his own PA company but still does occasional gigs with Cupid's Inspiration and The Rouges.

== Discography ==
- Still Life (Vertigo Records, 1971) (Akarma, 2003)
