= Rufino Tamayo =

Mexican painter, printmaker, and sculptor (1899–1991)

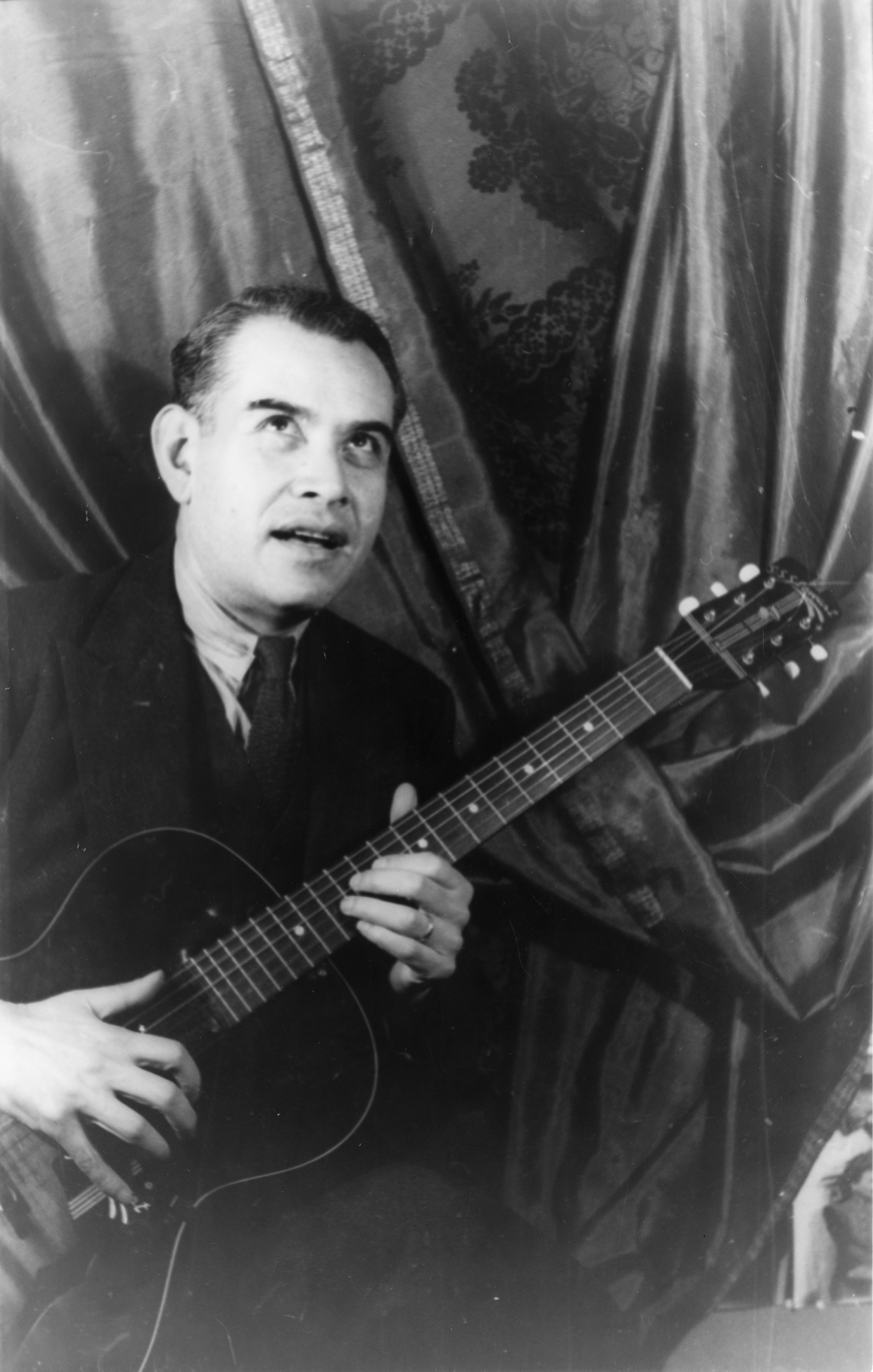
- Tamayo in 1945, photo by Carl Van Vechten
- Born: Rufino del Carmen Arellanes Tamayo; 25 August 1899; Oaxaca de Juárez, Mexico
- Died: 24 June 1991 (aged 91); Mexico City, Mexico
- Education: María Izquierdo, José Vasconcelos (National Archaeological Museum)
- Occupation: Painter
- Known for: Painting and drawing
- Movement: Modernism
- Spouse: Olga Flores
- Elected: Head of the Department of Ethnographic Drawings, Escuela Nacional de Artes Plasticas, Universidad Nacional Autónoma de México
- Website: www.rufinotamayo.org.mx/wp

Rufino del Carmen Arellanes Tamayo (Spanish pronunciation: [ruˈfino taˈmaʝo]; August 25, 1899 – June 24, 1991) was a Mexican painter of Zapotec heritage, born in Oaxaca de Juárez, Mexico. Tamayo was active in the mid-20th century in Mexico and New York, painting figurative abstraction with surrealist influences.

== Early life ==
Tamayo was born in Oaxaca, Mexico in 1899 to Manuel Arellanes and Florentina Tamayo. His mother was a seamstress and his father was a shoemaker. His mother died of tuberculosis in 1911. His Zapotec heritage is often cited as an early influence.

After his mother's death, he moved to Mexico City to live with his aunt, where he spent a lot of time working alongside her in the city's fruit markets.

While there, he devoted himself to helping his family with their small business. However, in 1917 Tamayo's aunt enrolled him at Escuela Nacional de Artes Plásticas at San Carlos to study art. As a student, he experimented with and was influenced by Cubism, Impressionism and Fauvism, among other popular art movements of the time, but with a distinctly Mexican feel. Tamayo studied drawing at the Academy of Art at San Carlos as a young adult, he became dissatisfied and eventually decided to study on his own. That was when he began working for José Vasconcelos at the Department of Ethnographic Drawings (1921); he was later appointed head of the department by Vasconcelos.

== Career ==
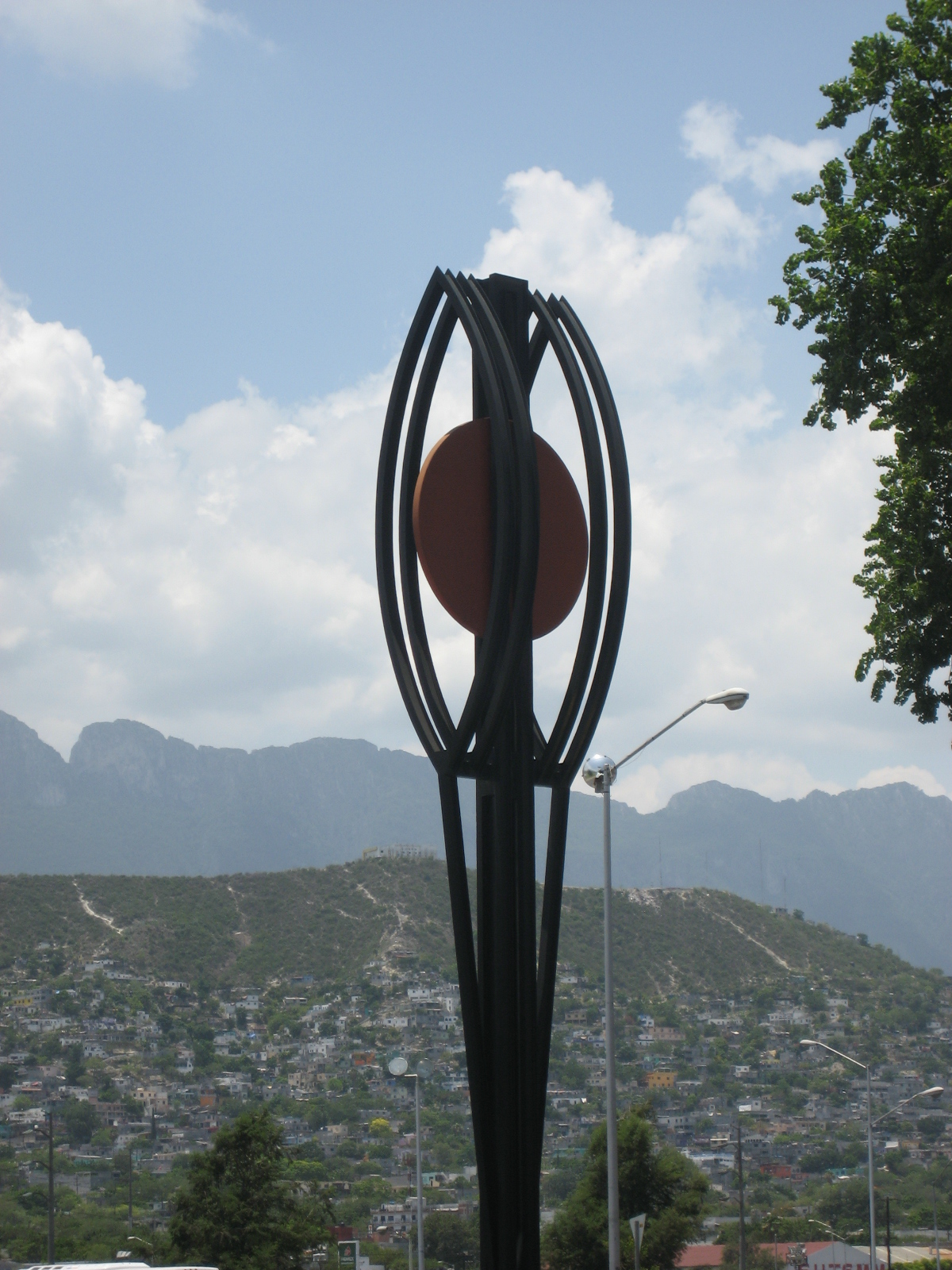
Homenaje al Sol (Tribute to the Sun). The intention of this work was to honor the nomads and natives of the Northeast who considered the Sun as a god.

Rufino Tamayo, along with other muralists such as Rivera, Orozco, and Siqueiros, represented the twentieth century in their native country of Mexico. After the Mexican Revolution, Tamayo devoted himself to creating a distinct identity in his work. He expressed what he envisioned as traditional Mexico and eschewed the overt political art of such contemporaries as José Clemente Orozco, Diego Rivera and David Alfaro Siqueiros. He disagreed with these muralists in their belief that the revolution was necessary for the future of Mexico but considered, instead, that the revolution would harm Mexico.

In his painting, Niños Jugando con Fuego (Children Playing with Fire, 1947), Tamayo shows two individuals being burnt by a fire they have created, a symbol of the Mexican people being injured by their own choice and action. Tamayo claimed, "We are in a dangerous situation, and the danger is that man may be absorbed and destroyed by what he has created". Due to his political opinions, he was characterized by some as a "traitor" to the political cause.

Tamayo came to feel that he could not freely express his art; he, therefore, decided in 1926 to leave Mexico and move to New York City. Prior to his departure, Tamayo organized a one-man show of his work in Mexico City where he was noticed for his individuality. He returned to Mexico in 1929 to have another solo show, this time being met with high praise and media coverage.

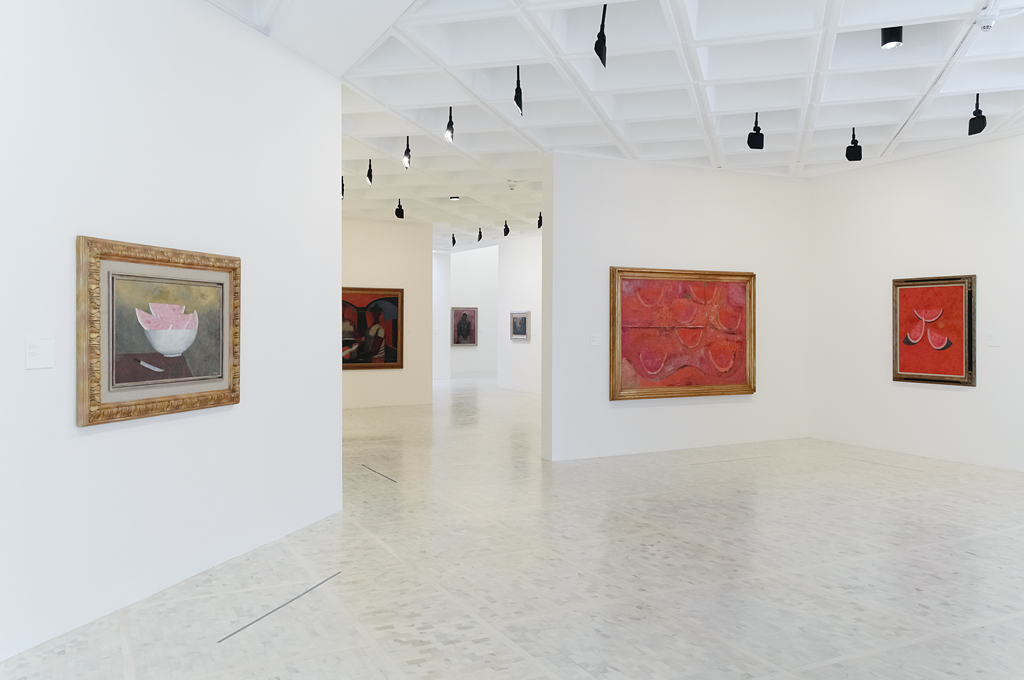
Tamayo Trayectos reopening exhibition of the Museo Rufino Tamayo, Mexico City in the 2012.

Tamayo's legacy in the history of art lies in his oeuvre of original graphic prints in which he cultivated every technique. Tamayo's graphic work, produced between 1925 and 1991, includes woodcuts, lithographs, etchings, and "Mixografia" prints. With the help of Mexican printer and engineer Luis Remba, Tamayo expanded the technical and aesthetic possibilities of the graphic arts by developing a new medium which they named Mixografia. This technique is a unique fine art printing process that allows for the production of prints with three-dimensional textures.

It not only registered the texture and volume of Rufino Tamayo's design but also granted the artist freedom to use any combination of solid materials in its creation. Tamayo was delighted with the Mixografia process and created some 80 original Mixographs. One of their most famous Mixografia is titled Dos Personajes Atacados por Perros (Two Characters Attacked by Dogs).

In 1935, he joined the Liga de Escritores y Artistas Revolucionarios (LEAR). The LEAR was an organization in which Mexican artists could express through painting and writing their responses towards the revolutionary war and governmental policies than are current in Mexico. Although Tamayo did not agree with Siqueiros and Orozco, they were chosen along with four others to represent their art in the first American Artists' Congress in New York. Now married, Rufino and Olga had planned on staying in New York only for the duration of the event; however, they made New York their permanent home for the next decade and a half.

In 1948, Tamayo's first major retrospective was held at the Palacio de Bellas Artes in Mexico City. Although his position remained controversial, his popularity was high. During this time, he became acquainted with young American artist Joseph Glasco who was studying at the school of art at San Miguel de Allende and Tamayo moved into Glasco's apartment and studio at one point. Uncomfortable with the continuing political controversy, Tamayo and Olga moved to Paris in 1949 where they remained for the next decade.

Tamayo also enjoyed portraying women in his paintings. His early works included many nudes, a subject that eventually disappeared in his later career. However, he often painted his wife Taide Olga Flores Rivas Zárate showing her struggles through color choices and facial expressions. The shared difficulties of painter and wife can be seen in the portrait Rufino and Olga, circa 1934, where the couple appears broken by life's obstacles.

Tamayo also painted murals, some of which are displayed inside Palacio Nacional de Bellas Artes opera house in Mexico City, such as Nacimiento de la nacionalidad (Birth of the Nationality, 1952).

Tamayo was known to have taught Francisco Toledo and Veronica Ruiz de Velasco, who were both in the National Museum of Modern Art.

=== Teaching and influence ===
While Tamayo did not maintain a formal teaching practice, he occasionally mentored younger artists and had a profound influence on Mexican art, particularly artists from his native Oaxaca.

In 1985, Tamayo invited emerging artist Veronica Ruiz de Velasco to his studio for private lessons, praising her exceptional use of color. She later became one of the youngest female artists to exhibit solo at Mexico's Museo de Arte Moderno.

Tamayo's success as an Oaxacan artist who achieved international recognition while maintaining connections to indigenous Mexican culture influenced subsequent generations, including Francisco Toledo (1940-2019), who similarly integrated Zapotec cultural themes into contemporary art. Tamayo's approach demonstrated that Mexican artists could achieve international recognition while remaining rooted in regional indigenous traditions.

== Influences ==
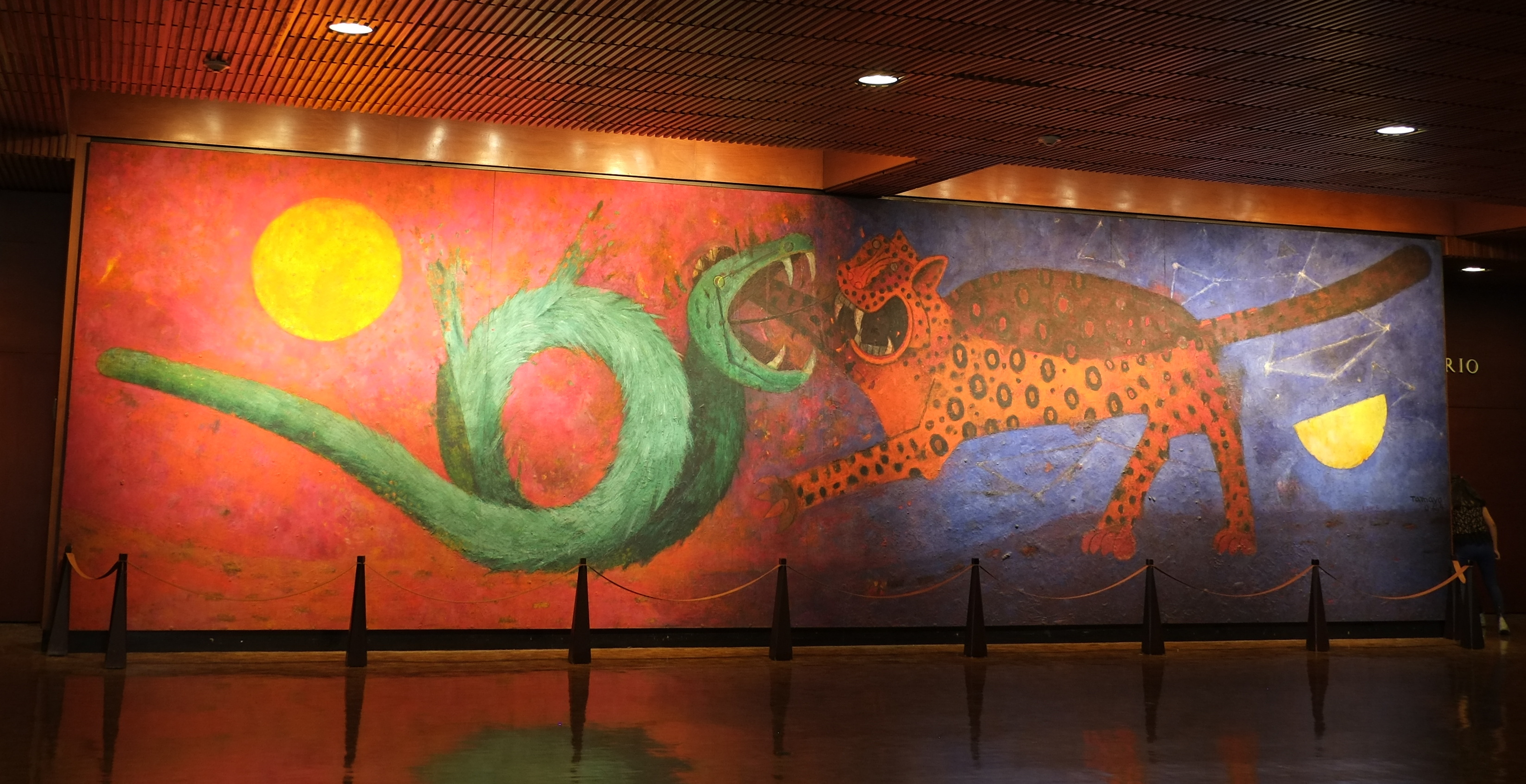
1964 painting by Tamayo

Tamayo was influenced by many artists. María Izquierdo, a fellow Mexican artist with whom he lived for a time, taught Tamayo precision in his color choices. He selected colors true to his Mexican environment. He argued, "Mexicans are not a gay race but a tragic one ..."

Other influences came from Tamayo's cultural heritage. One can say that Tamayo was one of the few artists of his era who enjoyed Mexico's ethnic differences. He enjoyed the fusion of Spanish-Mexican-Indian blood and that is shown in some of his art pieces. In Lion and Horse (1942), Tamayo used pre-Columbian ceramics. Tamayo was proud of his Mexican culture because his culture nourished him and, by traveling to other countries, his love for Mexico became greater.

Tamayo's acute awareness of the disregard shown towards Mexican artists influenced him profoundly. For example, according to Jose Carlos Ramirez, "Tamayo's work did not have much value". Many people doubted that Mexican artists could actually create art. Under the Díaz regime, artists of Mexican origin were ignored by society; it was commonly held that they lacked the skills to surpass artists of European descent.

== Outside Mexico ==
From 1937 to 1949, Tamayo and his wife Olga lived in New York where he painted some of his most memorable works. He had his first show in New York City at the Valentine Gallery. He gained credibility thereby and proceeded to exhibit works at the Knoedler Gallery and Marlborough Gallery. While in New York, Tamayo instructed Helen Frankenthaler at the Dalton School. Tamayo, while in the United States, attended important exhibitions that influenced his art mechanics. From Ingres to Picasso and French art exhibitions, Tamayo was introduced to Impressionism, Fauvism, and Cubism. Also, at an exhibition in Brooklyn in 1928, Tamayo came into contact with Henri Matisse, the French artist.

In a 1926 exhibition, 39 of Tamayo's works were displayed at the Weyhe Gallery in New York just a month after his arrival into the United States. This stands in stark contrast to the few showings which were held during his early career in México. The artist's sojourn in New York dramatically increased his recognition not only in the United States but in Mexico and other countries also.

== Style ==
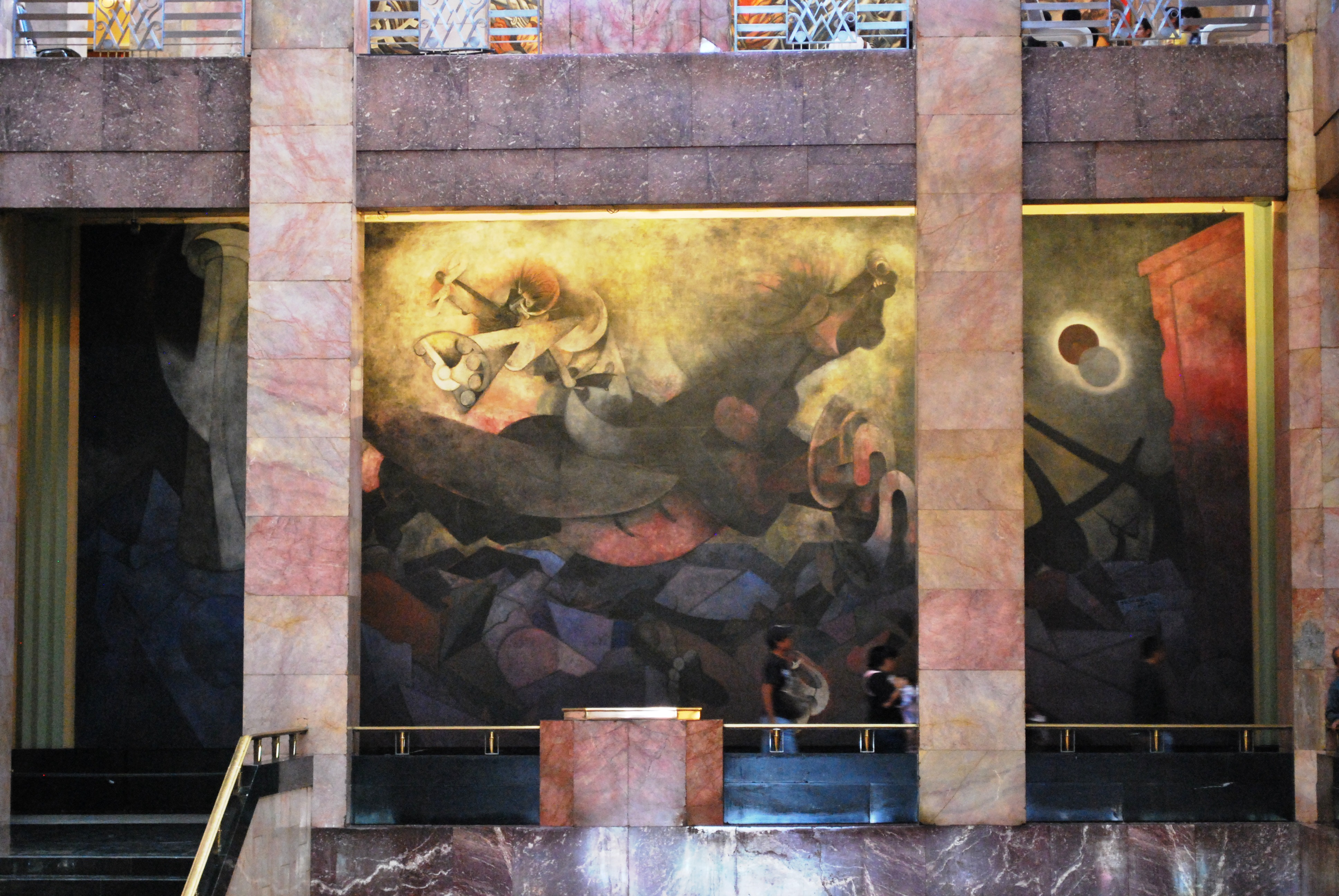
Nacimiento de nuestra nacionalidad by Rufino Tamayo on the first floor of the Palacio de Bellas Artes

Tamayo explained his approach to Paul Westheim as follows: "As the number of colors we use decreases, the wealth of possibilities increases". Tamayo favored using few colors rather than many; he asserted that fewer colors in a painting gave the art greater force and meaning. Tamayo's unique color choices are evident in the painting Tres personajes cantando (Three singers), 1981. In this painting, Tamayo employs pure colors such as red and purple; his restraint in the choice of color here confirms his belief that fewer colors, far from limiting the painting, actually enlarge the composition's possibilities. With that being said, Octavio Paz, author of the book Rufino Tamayo, argues that, "Time and again we have been told that Tamayo is a great colourist; but it should be added that this richness of colour is the result of sobriety". By being pure or, as Paz explained, sober with his color choice, Tamayo's paintings were enriched, not impoverished.

If I could express with a single word what it is that distinguishes Tamayo from other painters, I would say without a moment's hesitation: Sun. For the sun is in all his pictures, whether we see it or not.

— Nobel Prize–winning poet Octavio Paz

== List of artworks ==
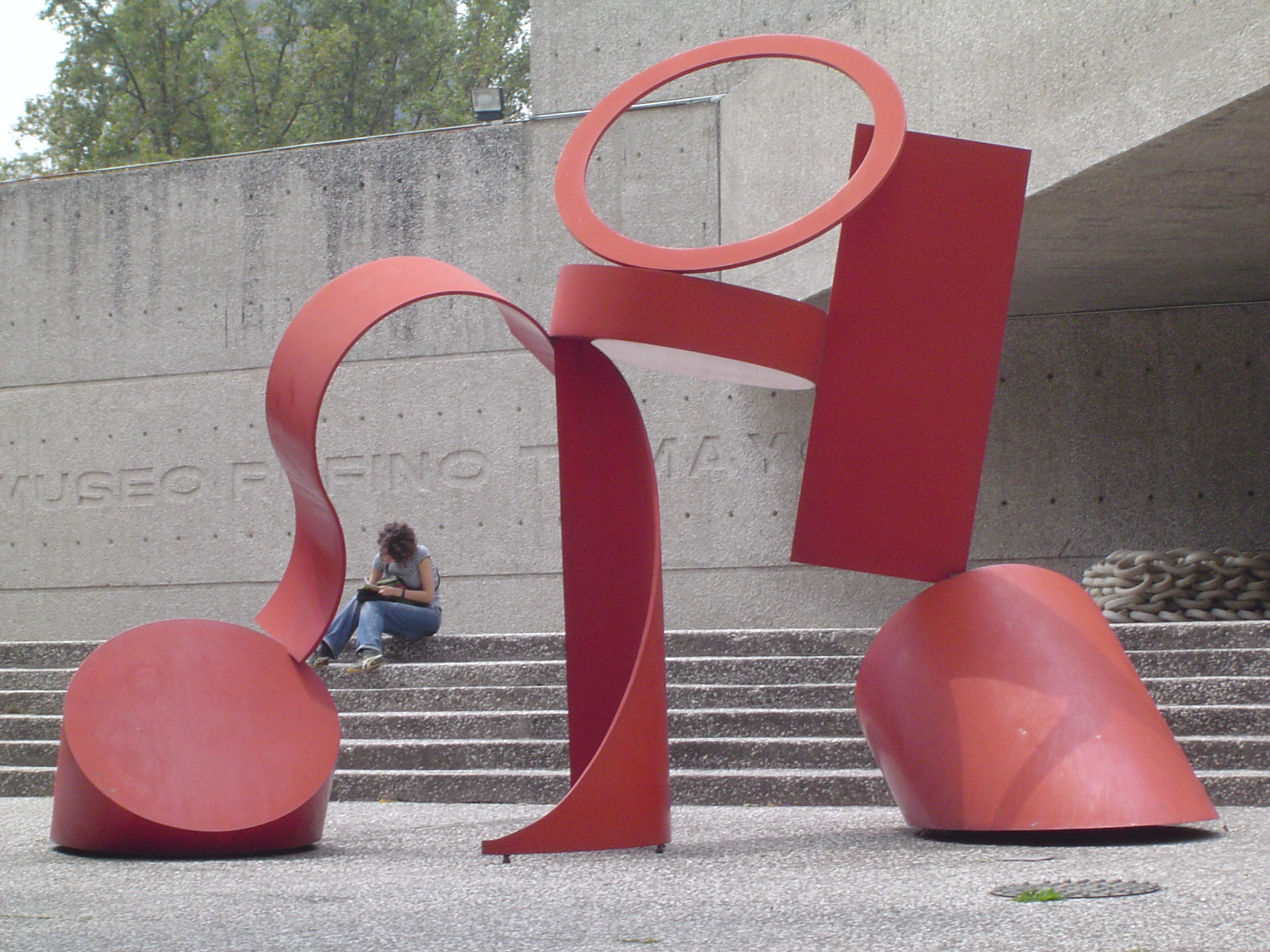
Entrance to museum Rufino Tamayo in Mexico.

- Untitled (1926)
- Cabeza mujer (1927)
- Mujeres con rebozo (1927)
- Still life with corn (1928)
- Naturaleza muerta con pie (1928)
- Still Life (1928)
- Interior with an alarm clock (1928)
- Frutero Y Domino (1928)
- The Window(1932)
- Aviation (1934)
- Rufino and Olga (1934)
- Two Bathers (1934)
- Animals (1941)
- Two Women Combing Their Hair (1941)
- Woman with a Bird Cage (1941)
- Lion and Horse (1942)
- Woman Spinning (1943)
- Children Playing with Fire (1947)
- Laughing Woman (1950)
- Nacimiento de nuestra nacionalidad (1952)
- Mexico de Hoy (1953)
- El día y la noche (Day and Night) (1954)
- Naturaleza muerta (1954)
- America (1955)
- Matrimonio (1958)
- Retrato de niños (Pareja de niños) (1966)
- El Perro en la Luna (The Dog on The Moon) (1973)
- Watermelons (1977)
- Niño con Sombrero [Boy with Hat], (1980)
- Tres personajes cantando (Three Singers) (1981)
- Hombre con flor (Man with Flower) (1989)
- Luna y Sol (Moon and Sun) (1990)

== Return home and later years ==
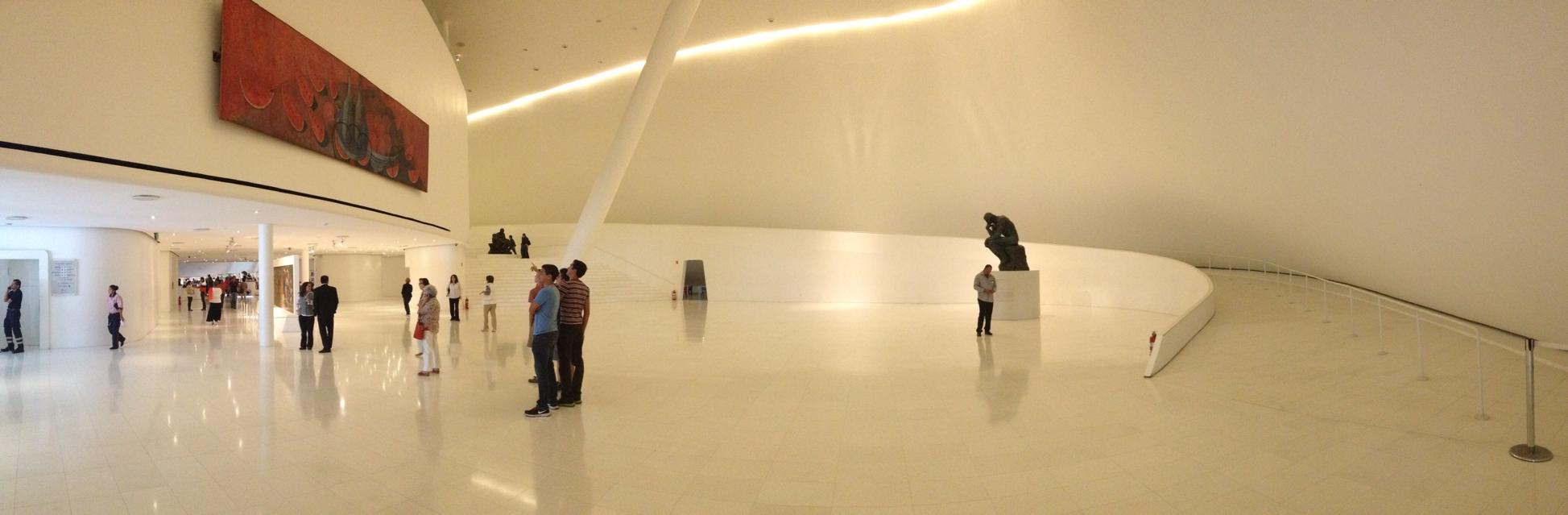
A panoramic photograph of the entrance floor in Museo Soumaya with Rufino painting.

In 1959, Tamayo and his wife, Olga Flores, returned to Mexico permanently and Tamayo built an art museum in his home town of Oaxaca, the Museo Rufino Tamayo. In 1972, Tamayo was the subject of the documentary film, Rufino Tamayo: The Sources of his Art by Gary Conklin.

The Tamayo Contemporary Art Museum (Museo Tamayo de Arte Contemporáneo), located on Mexico City's Paseo de la Reforma boulevard where it crosses Chapultepec Park, was opened in 1981 as a repository for the collections that Rufino Tamayo and his wife acquired during their lifetimes, and ultimately donated to the nation. Tamayo painted his last painting in 1990, at the age of 90, Luna y Sol (Moon and Sun).

Tamayo's work has been displayed in museums throughout the world, including the Solomon R. Guggenheim Museum in New York City, Crocker Art Museum in Sacramento, California, The Phillips Collection in Washington, the Cleveland Museum of Art in Cleveland, Ohio, the Naples Museum of Art in Naples, Florida, Art institute of Chicago in Chicago, Illinois, Oklahoma City Museum of Art in Oklahoma City, Oklahoma and The Museo Nacional Centro de Arte Reina Sofia in Madrid, Spain.

== Death ==
On June 12, 1991, Tamayo was admitted to Mexico City's National Institute of Medical Sciences and Nutrition for respiratory and heart failure. He suffered a heart attack and died on June 24, 1991.

Before his death, Tamayo continued creating art pieces in his late years. He was very productive at that stage in life. There were several important exhibitions and publications organized after his death.

== Theft and recovery ==
Tamayo's 1970 painting Tres Personajes was bought by a Houston man as a gift for his wife in 1977, then stolen from their storage locker in 1987 during a move. In 2003, Elizabeth Gibson found the painting in the trash on a New York City curb. Although she knew little about modern art, Gibson felt the painting "had power" and took it without knowing its origin or market value. She spent four years trying to learn about the work, eventually learning from the PBS website that it had been featured on an episode of Antiques Roadshow. After seeing the Missing Masterpieces segment about Tres Personajes, Gibson and the former owner arranged to sell the painting at a Sotheby's auction. In November, 2007 Gibson received a $15,000 reward plus a portion of the $1,049,000 auction sale price.

== Recognitions ==
- National Prize for Arts and Sciences in Fine Arts of Mexico, 1964
- Honorary Doctor by the National University of Mexico, 1978
- Honorary Doctor of Fine Arts by the University of Southern California, 1985
- Gold Medal of Merit in the Fine Arts of Spain, 1985
- Belisario Domínguez Medal of Honor by the Mexican Senate, 1988
- Grand Officer of the Order of Merit of the Italian Republic, 1989
- Honorary member of the National College of Mexico, 1991

== Exhibitions and retrospectives ==
Tamayo: The New York Years, Smithsonian American Art Museum 2017–2018

== Gallery ==
Una capilla de Oaxaca, 1920

El calvario de Oaxaca, 1921

Pátzcuaro, 1921

Landscape, 1921

Facade, 1921

Mosaic proyect, 1922

Naturaleza muerta con alcatraces, 1924

Niños, 1924

Reloj y teléfono, 1925

Fábrica, 1925

El fonógrafo, 1925

La indianilla, 1925

Familia, 1926

Hombre y mujer, 1926

Niño y fonógrafo, 1926

Naturaleza muerta con pie, 1928

Naturaleza muerta con plátanos, 1928

La silla amarilla, 1928

Arreglo de objetos, 1928

Naturaleza muerta, 1928

Los caracoles, 1929

Las niñas, 1929

Zeppelin, 1929

Dos niñas en un barco, 1930

Greeting card, 1930

== See also ==
- Acapantzingo, Cuernavaca
- List of people from Morelos
- Museo Rufino Tamayo, Mexico City
- Museo Rufino Tamayo, Oaxaca

== General references ==
- Ades, Dawn. Art in Latin America: The Modern Era 1820–1980. New Haven: Yale University Press, 2006. ISBN 978-0-300-04561-1.
- Matheos, José Corredor. Tamayo. New York: Rizzoli, 1987. ISBN 978-0-8478-0855-7.
- Sullivan, Edward J. The Language of Objects in the Art of the Americas. New Haven: Yale University Press, 2007. ISBN 978-0-300-11106-4.

Preceded by Eduardo García Maynez	Belisario Domínguez Medal of Honor; 1988	Succeeded by Raúl Castellano Jiménez
