= Holyhead (disambiguation) =

Holyhead is a town and port on Holy Island, Anglesey, Wales.

== Other articles concerning Holyhead ==
- Admiralty Arch, Holyhead
- Chester and Holyhead Railway
- Holyhead Admiralty Pier railway station
- Holyhead Breakwater
- Holyhead Breakwater Lighthouse
- Holyhead Golf Club
- Holyhead Hotspur F.C.
- Holyhead Lifeboat Station
- Holyhead Mail Pier Lighthouse
- Holyhead Maritime Museum
- Holyhead Market Hall
- Holyhead Mountain
- Holyhead Mountain Hut Circles
- Holyhead railway station
- Holyhead School (in Birmingham, not Holyhead)
- Holyhead TMD
- Holyhead Town Council
- Holyhead Town F.C.
- Holyhead Town Hall
- Holyhead transmitting station
- Port of Holyhead
- St Mary's Church, Holyhead

== People with the surname ==
Holyhead is also a surname. Notable people with this surname include:

- Joseph Holyhead (1880–1944), English footballer
- Robert Holyhead (born 1974), British abstract artist
