= Virginia Crosbie =

British Conservative politician

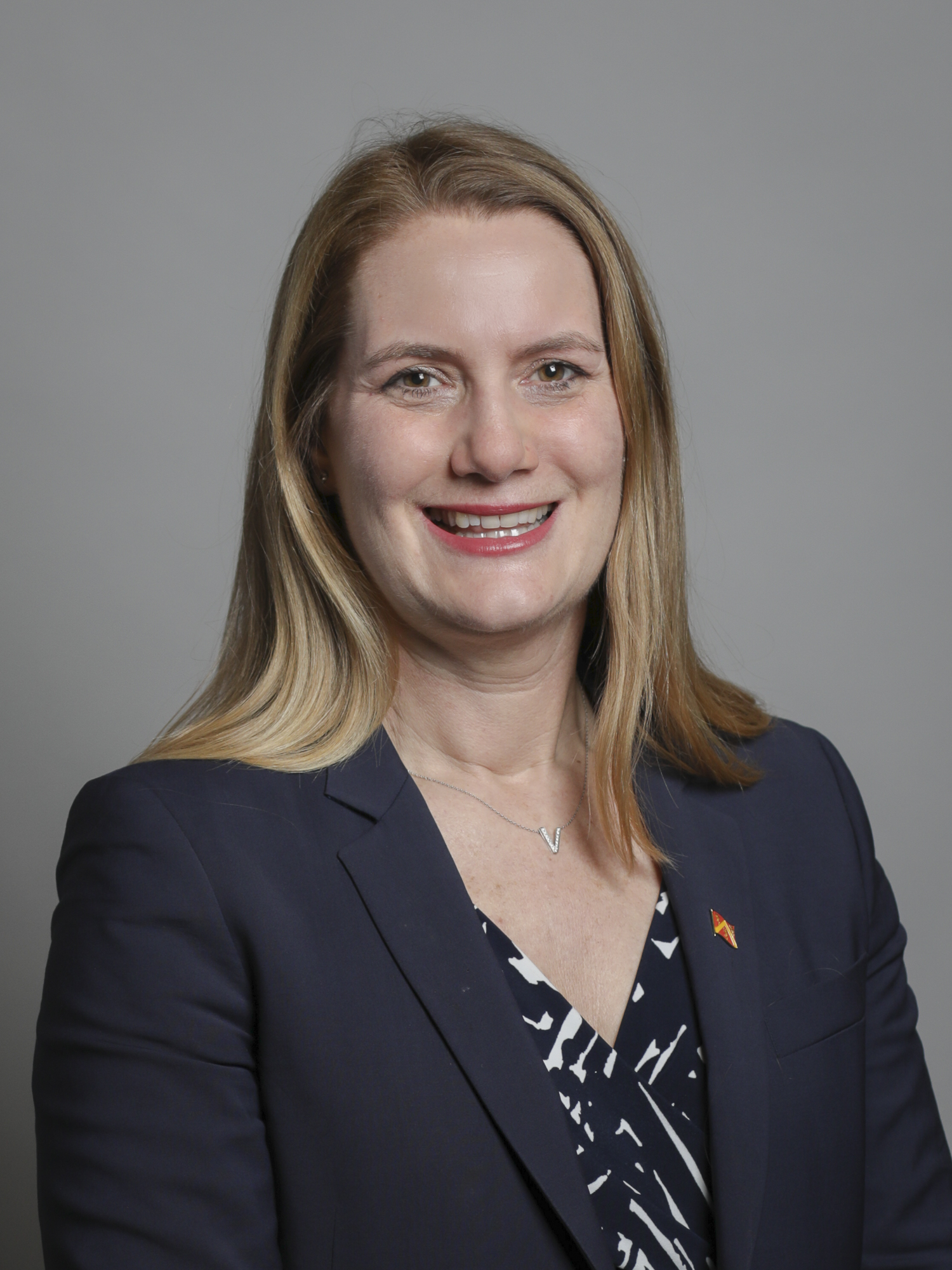
- Official portrait, 2020

Member of Parliament for Ynys Môn
- In office 12 December 2019 – 30 May 2024
- Preceded by: Albert Owen
- Succeeded by: Llinos Medi

Personal details
- Born: Maldon, Essex, England
- Party: Conservative
- Children: 3
- Education: Queen Mary University of London; University of Westminster
- Website: www.virginiacrosbie.co.uk

Virginia Ann Crosbie is a British former politician and nuclear industry advocate. Crosbie is the CEO of NEMO an international non-governmental organization focused on advancing safe, secure, and sustainable nuclear technology in the maritime sector. She served as the member of Parliament (MP) for Ynys Môn from 2019 until 2024. Crosbie is chair of Supporters of Nuclear Energy (SONE), and founder and partner at Nuclear Capital LLP. Crosbie is a board director of the Nuclear Institute, chairs key events (Foresight) and contributes to energy and policy reports and articles.

Prior to her political career, Crosbie worked for UBS and HSBC.

== Early life ==
Crosbie was born in Maldon, Essex, to an English mother and Welsh father, and grew up in the village of Tiptree, where her mother worked at the Tiptree Jam Factory. She attended Colchester County High School. As a teenager, she worked as a dolphin trainer at the Woburn Safari Park for Terry Nutkins's BBC children's television series Animal Magic. She studied microbiology at Queen Mary University of London before completing a diploma in management studies at the University of Westminster. Crosbie also did a corporate finance programme at London Business School. After graduating, Crosbie worked for Glaxo Wellcome before becoming a pharmaceutical analyst at the bank UBS. She then worked for HSBC. She then retrained, and became a part-time mathematics teacher.

She is a former chair of the charity Save the Baby which is based at St Mary's Hospital, Paddington. Crosbie decided to join the organisation after experiencing a miscarriage. She was a director of Women2Win.

== Parliamentary career ==
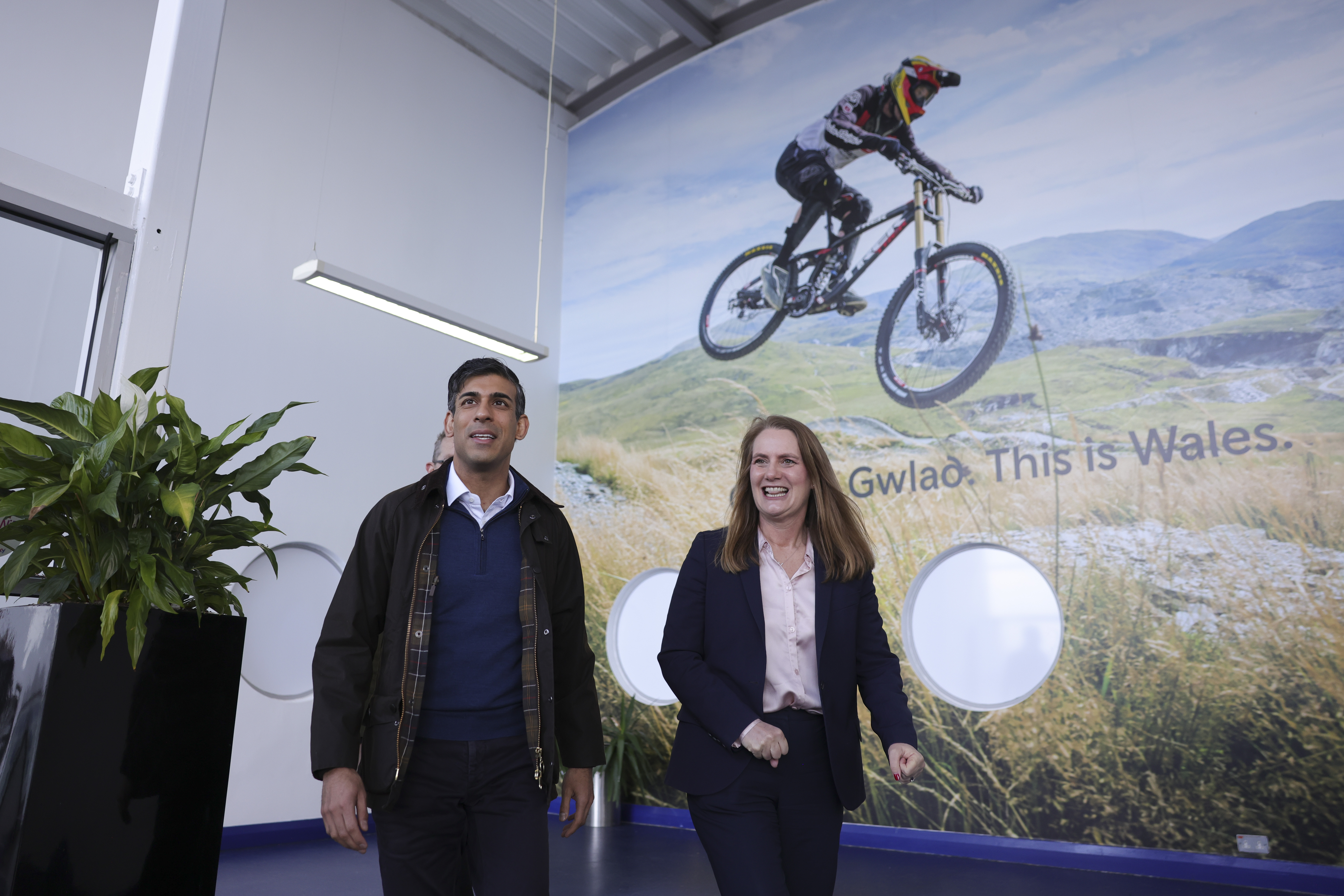
Crosbie with Prime Minister Rishi Sunak in 2023

Crosbie contested the Rhondda constituency as the Conservative candidate in the 2017 general election. She finished third behind the Labour Party and Plaid Cymru candidates. She then became the deputy chair of the Kensington, Chelsea and Fulham Conservatives Association, and the director of Women2Win, an organisation which campaigns for more female Conservative parliamentarians. She also worked as a senior parliamentary researcher for Basingstoke MP Maria Miller.

She was selected as the Conservative candidate for Ynys Môn on 14 November 2019 (the day when nominations closed). Crosbie was chosen after the former Brecon and Radnorshire MP Chris Davies, the previously selected candidate, withdrew the day before due to opposition by the local association, and other Welsh Conservatives. She was elected as MP for Ynys Môn at the 2019 general election with a majority of 1,968 (5.4%). The constituency had been represented by a Labour Party MP since the 2001 general election. She was the first Conservative MP to represent this three-way marginal seat since 1987.

In January 2020, Crosbie tabled an early day motion about the protection of the Welsh language. From February 2020 to August 2021, she was the Parliamentary Private Secretary (PPS) to the Department of Health and Social Care, she was then PPS to the Wales Office from September 2021 to July 2022 and again from September 2023 to January 2024.

Crosbie was a member of the Welsh Affairs Select Committee throughout much of her time as an MP and sat on the Women and Equalities Committee between March and September 2020. In July 2020, Crosbie apologised for errors on her Welsh language website, stating that the machine translation was "not 100% perfect". She said she was learning the Welsh language and working on a fully bilingual website. Her bilingual website was put in place in 2023. She carried out her first Welsh interview with Guto Bebb for S4C in 2022.

In 2020 she successfully campaigned to give Ynys Môn protected status in the UK Boundary Changes review. An amendment put forward by Maria Miller MP brought Anglesey in line with other UK islands including the Isle of Wight and Orkney ensuring that it would not become a joint constituency with part of mainland Wales.

In January 2021, Crosbie began a campaign to get 100 people in Anglesey trained in mental health first aid. She runs a long term campaign to find Anglesey's Hidden Heroes which she launched in 2020 during the Covid pandemic. She campaigned locally for improved broadband connectivity, better availability of defibrillators, a third Menai crossing, reversing the Welsh Government's 20mph default speed limit, a new medical centre in Holyhead, better understanding of the impact of large scale solar farms on rural communities and agricultural land and a new Aldi supermarket in Amlwch

In 2020, Crosbie started the Anglesey Freeport Bidding Consortium following the UK Government's announcement that at least one freeport would be established in Wales. The Consortium included Anglesey Council, Stena Line (owners of Holyhead Port), Bangor University and M-SParc. In May 2022 when the UK and Welsh Governments announced the Welsh Freeport competition the Consortium formed the basis for the Anglesey Freeport bid group. Freeport status was granted to Anglesey in March 2023. when the then Prime Minister Rishi Sunak and then First Minister of Wales Mark Drakeford met Crosbie and made the announcement in Holyhead.

In 2023 Crosbie was instrumental in the UK Government's announcement that £20m funding would be granted to the Welsh Government for the refurbishment of Holyhead Breakwater. She sponsored Anglesey County Council's bid for the Community Renewal Fund which resulted in £2.7m being granted to Anglesey from the Fund for projects including promotion of the Welsh language in 2022.

She also sponsored Anglesey County Council's bid for UK Government Levelling Up Funding. In January 2023 the Council was granted £17.3m from the Levelling Up fund for regeneration of the port town of Holyhead including works on the Ucheldre Centre, St Cybi's Church, Holyhead Town Council Cinema and redeveloping vacant shops in Holyhead town centre and the Newry shelters.

Since beginning her career as an MP, Crosbie has made the case for building new nuclear power stations in the UK. In December 2020 she founded and chaired the Nuclear Delivery Group with fellow Conservative MP Trudy Harrison, was Secretary to the APPG for Nuclear Energy and set up and Chaired the APPG for Small Modular Reactors. She was very vocal in her support of setting up a new nuclear plant on the site of Wylfa on Anglesey.

She became synonymous with nuclear and Wylfa in the House of Commons earning the nickname of the Atomic Kitten. She sat on the Nuclear Energy (Financing) Bill Committee and was instrumental in the inclusion of new nuclear in the green taxonomy announced in the Chancellor's 2023 budget. In September 2023 the then Prime Minister, Rishi Sunak, hinted that Wylfa could be a preferred nuclear site. In the March 2024 budget the then Chancellor of the Exchequer Jeremy Hunt said of Crosbie "Ynys Môn has a vital role in delivering our nuclear ambitions and no one should take more credit for today’s announcement than my tireless, tenacious, turbo-charged hon friend for Ynys Môn" when he announced that the UK Government through Great British Nuclear would be purchasing the Wylfa site from Hitachi. In May 2024 the Government announced that Wylfa would be the site for its next gigawatt nuclear power plant.

Crosbie took several nuclear companies including Bechtel, Westinghouse, Rolls Royce and Kepco around Ynys Môn to look at Wylfa. She also brought the representatives of the US Energy Department to visit to Wylfa. She also visited nuclear sites in Finland, Georgia in the USA and Hinkley.

Crosbie expressed her concerns about plans to develop large scale solar farms on land across Anglesey. She launched a survey of local people and contributed to a Westminster Hall debate on large scale solar farms. In the Post Office scandal Crosbie spoke on behalf of constituents affected in and secured a meeting with the Post Office Minister for an Anglesey former sub-postmaster in January 2024. She had previously spoken on behalf of those affected on Anglesey in 2021.

From September 2021 to July 2022, she was a Parliamentary Private Secretary in the Office of the Secretary of State for Wales. Crosbie resigned as PPS in July 2022 in protest against the leadership of Prime Minister Boris Johnson over his handling of the Chris Pincher scandal. She endorsed Sajid Javid in the July 2022 Conservative Party leadership election.

In January 2023, Crosbie said that she wears a stab vest when meeting constituents. She commented that she took this precaution following the murder of Conservative MP Sir David Amess in 2021. Crosbie had previously reported around 30 threats, abusive emails and social media posts to the police since being elected as an MP which included violent threats.

Crosbie apologised in June 2023 for attending an event briefly in Parliament while COVID-19 lockdown restrictions were in place on 8 December 2020 which she attributed to a "momentary error of judgment". Subsequent investigations by the Metropolitan Police and the Independent Parliamentary Standards Authority both found that Crosbie's attendance at the event did not contravene COVID regulations.

In July 2023 Crosbie was again made PPS to the Office of the Secretary of State for Wales.

In 2023 a Private Member's Bill sponsored by Crosbie - the Employment (Allocation of Tips) Bill - received royal assent from King Charles III giving hospitality workers 100% of the tips they have earned. The legislation came into effect in 2024.

Crosbie has lobbied for support for farmers on Anglesey. She led a ten minute rule bill to update the Dogs (Protection of Livestock) Act 1953 which formed the basis of proposed reforms to the Act in the Dogs (Protection of Livestock) (Amendment) Bill introduced by Therese Coffey. The amendment bill fell when the Government changed in the 2024 General Election. She sat on the Agriculture Bill Committee and Environmental Bill Committee. In 2023 she brought the DEFRA Farming Minister, Mark Spencer MP, to visit the Anglesey Agricultural Show. She was part of the campaign to encourage supermarkets to tag foods for "Buy British".

In 2023 following her support for a local campaign for a solution to the low platform at Ty Croes railway station, the Department for Transport Rail Minister, Huw Merriman MP, visited and announced £1m funding for a Harrington Hump at the station.

In 2020 Crosbie took part in the Parliamentary Armed Forces Scheme and she supported developments in RAF Valley on her island constituency.

Crosbie has also led Parliamentary debates on communities served by the West Coast Mainline franchise, the closure of the Menai Suspension Bridge and Freeports in Wales. She subsequently expressed her disappointment that Avanti West Coast was reawarded the West Coast Mainline contract and that the Menai Bridge repairs would not be complete until 2026.

Following the Welsh Government's announcement in 2023 that it was axing plans for a third bridge across the Menai Strait, Crosbie started a campaign for a third Menai Crossing citing Welsh Government evidence that not going ahead with the crossing would give "detrimental effects on the economy of the Isle of Anglesey and north west Wales".

Crosbie also campaigned for better digital connectivity across Anglesey.

In May 2023 she gave away a mile of Union Flag bunting to communities across Ynys Môn to celebrate the Coronation of King Charles III

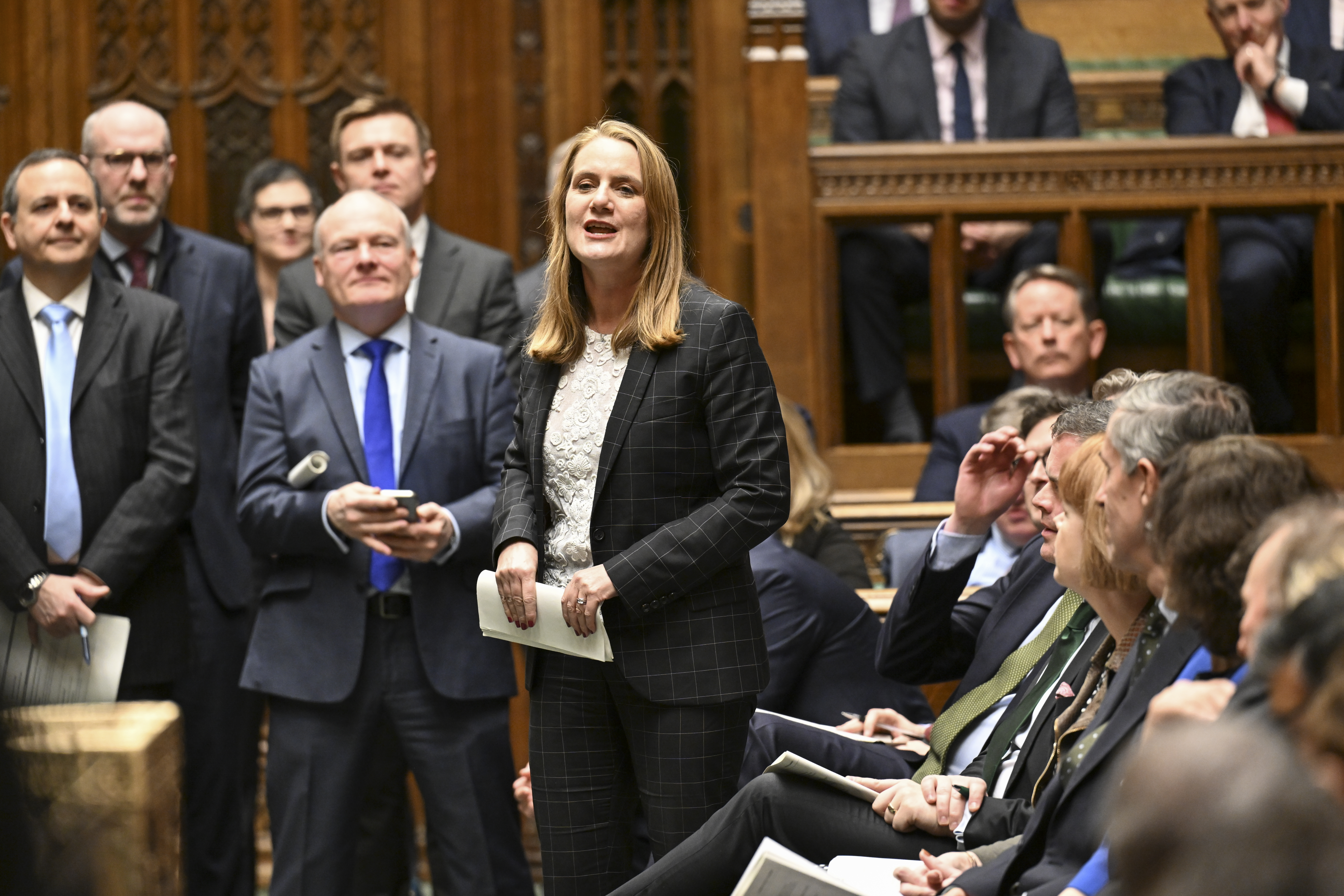
Crosbie speaking during Prime Minister's Questions, 7 February 2024

She stated that one of her aims was to bring jobs and investment to Ynys Môn, and welcomed a £175m investment at RAF Valley and a new HMRC Inland Border Facility in Holyhead. In 2023 she set up her Local Jobs for Local People campaign to support Anglesey locals being prioritised for new local jobs. Local, national and international companies signed up to commit to her campaign.

In 2023, following a question asked by Crosbie in Business Questions, the Leader of the House, Penny Mordaunt MP, declared the Welsh Government's "blanket" 20 mph speed limit "absolutely insane". Crosbie had stated that "In many places - outside schools, outside hospitals - 20mph is appropriate".

Crosbie launched a number of local campaigns whilst MP for Ynys Môn including her campaign to bring Aldi supermarkets to Amlwch - which led Penny Mordaunt to announced that she would use her ceremonial sword to open the new supermarket in Business Questions. She worked with local residents in Brynsiencyn to oppose the introduction of double yellow lines through the village. She also campaigned for a new health centre in Holyhead

She sat on the Seafarers Wages Bill, British Sign Language Bill, Shark Fin Bill, Economic Crime and Corporate Transparency Bill, Health and Care Bill and the Women and Equalities Committee.

Whilst MP for Ynys Môn she hosted more than thirty ministerial visits to the island - including visits from two sitting prime ministers and raised more than £40,000 for local charities. She also nominated and welcomed several local people to local champion receptions at 10 Downing Street. In 2020 - two months after her election - she offered a lift to a constituent caught out in Storm Dennis. The person she rescued turned out to be one of her online trolls.

Crosbie contested the Ynys Môn seat as the Conservative Party candidate, but was defeated by the Plaid Cymru candidate Llinos Medi, coming second by just 637 votes.

== Post-parliamentary career ==
Following her defeat at the 2024 general election, Crosbie was appointed as a partner at Nuclear Capital. She is managing director of the Nuclear Energy Maritime Organization (NEMO), a membership-led body promoting the safe, secure and sustainable use of nuclear technologies in the maritime sector. She also remains active in the sector as a board director of the Nuclear Institute and chair of Supporters of Nuclear Energy (SONE).

== Personal life ==
Crosbie is married and has three children. Her brother Simon died by suicide in 2018 at the age of 52.

After her election in December 2019, she committed to learning the Welsh language and passed her entry-level speaking examination in July 2021.

Parliament of the United Kingdom
Preceded by Albert Owen	Member of Parliament for Ynys Môn; 2019–2024	Succeeded by Llinos Medi
