= KEPCO =

KEPCO may refer to:

- Kansai Electric Power Company, a Japanese power provider
- Korea Electric Power Corporation, a South Korean power provider
  - KEPCO E&C, a nuclear power design and engineering company, and subsidiary of the Korea Electric Power Corporation
- Kepco Power, a power supply manufacturer in New York
