= Llinos Medi =

Welsh politician

Llinos Medi MP
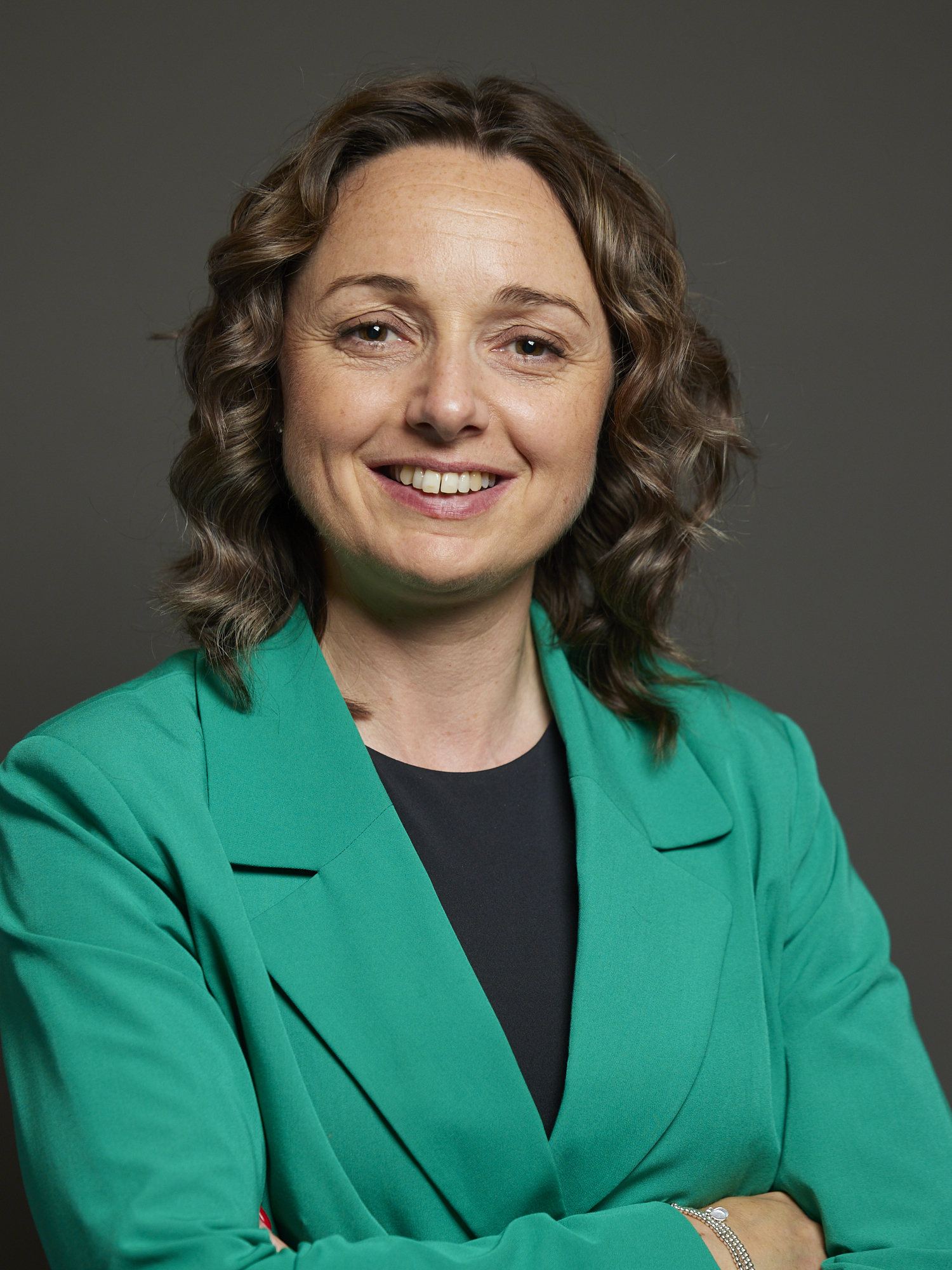
- Official portrait, 2024

Member of Parliament for Ynys Môn
- Incumbent
- Assumed office 4 July 2024
- Preceded by: Virginia Crosbie
- Majority: 637 (2.0%)

Leader of Isle of Anglesey County Council
- In office 23 May 2017 – 9 July 2024
- Preceded by: Ieuan Williams
- Succeeded by: Gary Pritchard

Member of Isle of Anglesey County Council for Talybolion
- In office 2 May 2013 – September 2024
- Succeeded by: Kenneth Hughes

Personal details
- Born: Llinos Medi Huws c. 1981 (age 44–45)
- Party: Plaid Cymru
- Children: 2
- Education: Ysgol Gynradd Llanddona

Llinos Medi Huws (born c. 1981) is a Welsh Plaid Cymru politician who has served as Member of Parliament (MP) for Ynys Môn since 2024. She previously served as leader of the Isle of Anglesey County Council from 2017 to 2024. A councillor for Talybolion ward, she was first elected to the local authority in 2013, and became leader of the Plaid Cymru group in 2015.

== Early career ==
When Medi was 16 she went to do a social care course, and then started working in a care home when she was 18. She has worked to support the use of the Welsh language in schools and Young Farmer organisations. She has also been a teaching assistant, an egg-seller and a milk recorder on farms.

== Political career ==
In April 2015, Medi became the leader of the Plaid Cymru group (and the official opposition) on the Isle of Anglesey County Council. On 23 May 2017, Medi became the first woman to lead Anglesey County Council and was among the youngest council leaders in the United Kingdom at the age of 35. She succeeded the independent councillor Ieuan Williams as council leader. She led a coalition of 21 Plaid Cymru and independent councillors. She was also the social services portfolio holder.

On 21 September 2023, she announced her intention to stand for nomination as Plaid Cymru candidate for Ynys Môn, the constituency that covers the Isle of Anglesey and surrounding islands, in the 2024 general election.

Medi won the nomination, and on 5 July 2024 she was elected as MP for Ynys Môn, winning with 10,590 votes and 32.5% of the vote share; and narrowly defeating the incumbent Conservative Party MP Virginia Crosbie by 637 votes. Medi later stood down as a councillor.

In October 2024, she was elected as a member of the Welsh Affairs Select Committee.

== Political views ==
Her personal priorities are the economy, health and wellbeing of the citizens of North Wales.

She believes that rules on political donations need to be stricter.

== Awards ==
Medi was added to the list of 100 Welsh Women who have made a significant and lasting impact within their fields of expertise compiled by the Women's Equality Network in 2020.

== Personal life ==
She is a farmer's daughter. She was married but is now divorced and has two children, Elliw and Twm. In 2015 she and her children became homeless, and she talked about this in her maiden speech as the new MP for Ynys Môn.

Parliament of the United Kingdom
Preceded by Virginia Crosbie	Member of Parliament for Ynys Môn; 2024–present	Incumbent
