= Holyhead Admiralty Pier railway station =

Disused railway station in Holyhead, Anglesey

Coordinates: 53.3143°N 4.6199°W

Holyhead Admiralty Pier

General information
- Location: Holyhead, Anglesey; Wales

Other information
- Status: Disused

History
- Original company: Chester and Holyhead Railway
- Pre-grouping: London and North Western Railway
- Post-grouping: London, Midland and Scottish Railway

Key dates
- 20 May 1851: Opened
- 1 April 1925: Closed

Holyhead Admiralty Pier railway station served the pier in the town of Holyhead, Anglesey, Wales, from 1851 to 1925 on the Chester and Holyhead Railway.

== History ==
The station was opened on 20 May 1851 by the Chester and Holyhead Railway. The services were horse-drawn until 1860. The goods shed was used by passengers to board the ferry to Ireland. They stopped using this in 1880 when the line was extended to Holyhead. The station closed on 1 April 1925.

Preceding station	Historical railways	Following station
Terminus	Chester and Holyhead Railway	Holyhead; Line and station open
