= Holyhead TMD =

Railway maintenance depot in Holyhead, Gwynedd

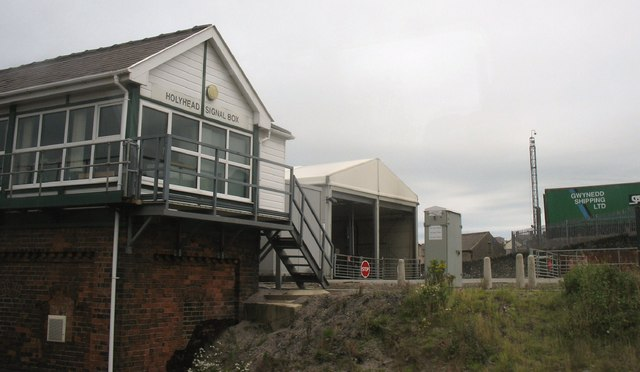
- Holyhead signal box and one of the depot sheds in 2009
- Interactive map of Holyhead TMD

Location
- Location: Holyhead, Gwynedd
- Coordinates: 53.3047°N 4.6289°W
- OS grid: SH249818

Characteristics
- Owner: Transport for Wales Rail
- Depot code: HD (1973 -); HC (carriage sidings) (1973 -)
- Type: DMU

Holyhead TMD is a traction maintenance depot located in Holyhead, Gwynedd, Wales. The depot is situated on the North Wales Coast Line and is on the eastern side of the line, to the south of Holyhead station.

The depot code is HD. The carriage sidings, adjacent to the station, are coded as HC.

== History ==
Around 1987, Classes 08, Class 45, 47 and DMUs could be seen stabled at the depot. The present depot was built as a one through-road shed and opened by British Rail in 1989.

There was previously a container terminal near the carriage sidings that was used by Class 08 shunters, 25 and 47 locomotives. However, this closed in 1991.

== Present ==
As of 2016, the depot has no allocation. It is, instead, a stabling point for Transport for Wales Rail Class 67 locomotives, Class 150 Sprinters, Class 158 Express Sprinters and Avanti West Coast Class 221 Super Voyagers.

== Bibliography ==
- Smith, Paul; Stuart, Philip (2010). Railway Depots. Ian Allan Ltd. ISBN 9780711034822. OCLC 528397749.
- Webster, Neil; Greengrass, Robert; Greaves, Simon (1987). British Rail Depot Directory. Metro Enterprises Ltd. ISBN 9780947773076. OCLC 20420397.
