= Holyhead Town Hall =

Municipal Building in Holyhead, Wales

- Neuadd y Dref Caergybi (Welsh)
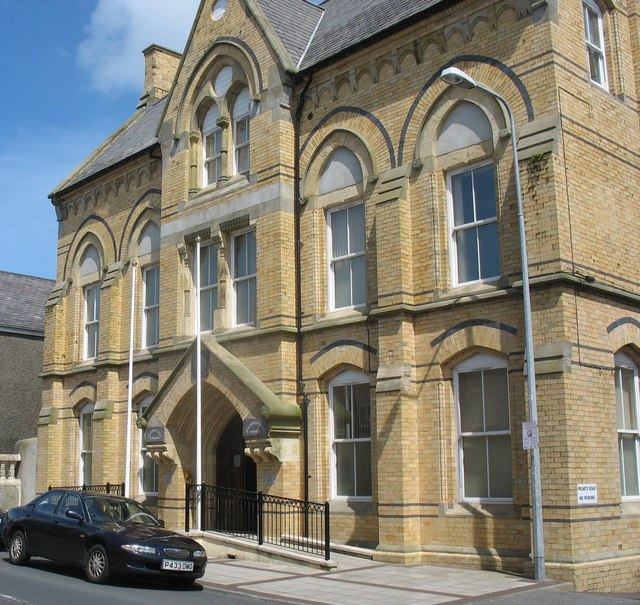
- Holyhead Town Hall

- Shown in Anglesey
- 53.3137°N 4.6333°W
- Location: Newry Street, Holyhead

History
- Built: 1875

Site notes
- Architect: John Thomas
- Architectural style: Gothic Revival style

Holyhead Town Hall (Welsh: Neuadd y Dref Caergybi) is a municipal structure in Newry Street, Holyhead, Wales. The town hall is the meeting place of Holyhead Town Council.

== History ==
The first municipal building in Holyhead was Holyhead Market Hall which, as well as being used as a venue for holding markets, also hosted the local law court hearings. In December 1873, a group of local businessmen formed a company to raise finance for a new public hall and to commission its construction: the site they selected in Newry Street was owned by William Williams of Jew Street in Holyhead.

The new building was designed by the county surveyor for Caernarfonshire, John Thomas, in the Gothic Revival style, built by a local contractor, Richard Williams, in buff brick and was officially opened on 31 August 1875. The opening was celebrated by two concerts, both conducted by Tanymarian, which included performances by the Welsh baritone singer, James Sauvage, in the presence of the local member of parliament, Morgan Lloyd.

The design involved a symmetrical main frontage with five bays facing onto Newry Street; the central bay, which slightly projected forward, featured a deeply recessed arched doorway with a stone surround on the ground floor and a pair of slightly recessed sash windows flanked by colonettes on the first floor. There was an open gable above, which contained a pair of mullioned windows with tracery and, above that, an oculus. The other bays, which were flanked by buttresses, were fenestrated by sash windows with arched surrounds on both floors. Internally, the principal room was the main assembly hall, which featured a proscenium arch and a stage; there was also a club room and a room for the freemasons to hold their meetings. The floor in the entrance hall featured some colourful tiles manufactured by Henry C. Webb of Worcester.

Following significant growth in the population, largely associated with the status of Holyhead as a seaport, the area became an urban district with the town hall as its headquarters in 1894. As well as being a venue for civic events, the town hall was licensed as a cinema from 1910. The town hall continued to serve as the headquarters of the urban district council for much of the 20th century, but ceased to be the local seat of government when the enlarged Ynys Mon Borough Council was formed at Llangefni in 1974. Instead, it became the offices and meeting place of Holyhead Town Council. An extensive programme of refurbishment works, which involved the creation of four new offices above the main assembly hall, was completed by DU Construction in April 2007.

A plaque to commemorate the centenary of the sinking of two ships, which had regularly sailed from Holyhead and had employed many local people amongst the crew, was unveiled at the town hall in November 2015: these were the passenger ship, HMS Tara, and of the hospital ship, HMHS Anglia, both of which were sunk by the Imperial German Navy in November 1915 during the First World War.
