= Albert Owen =

British Labour politician

Jason Albert Owen
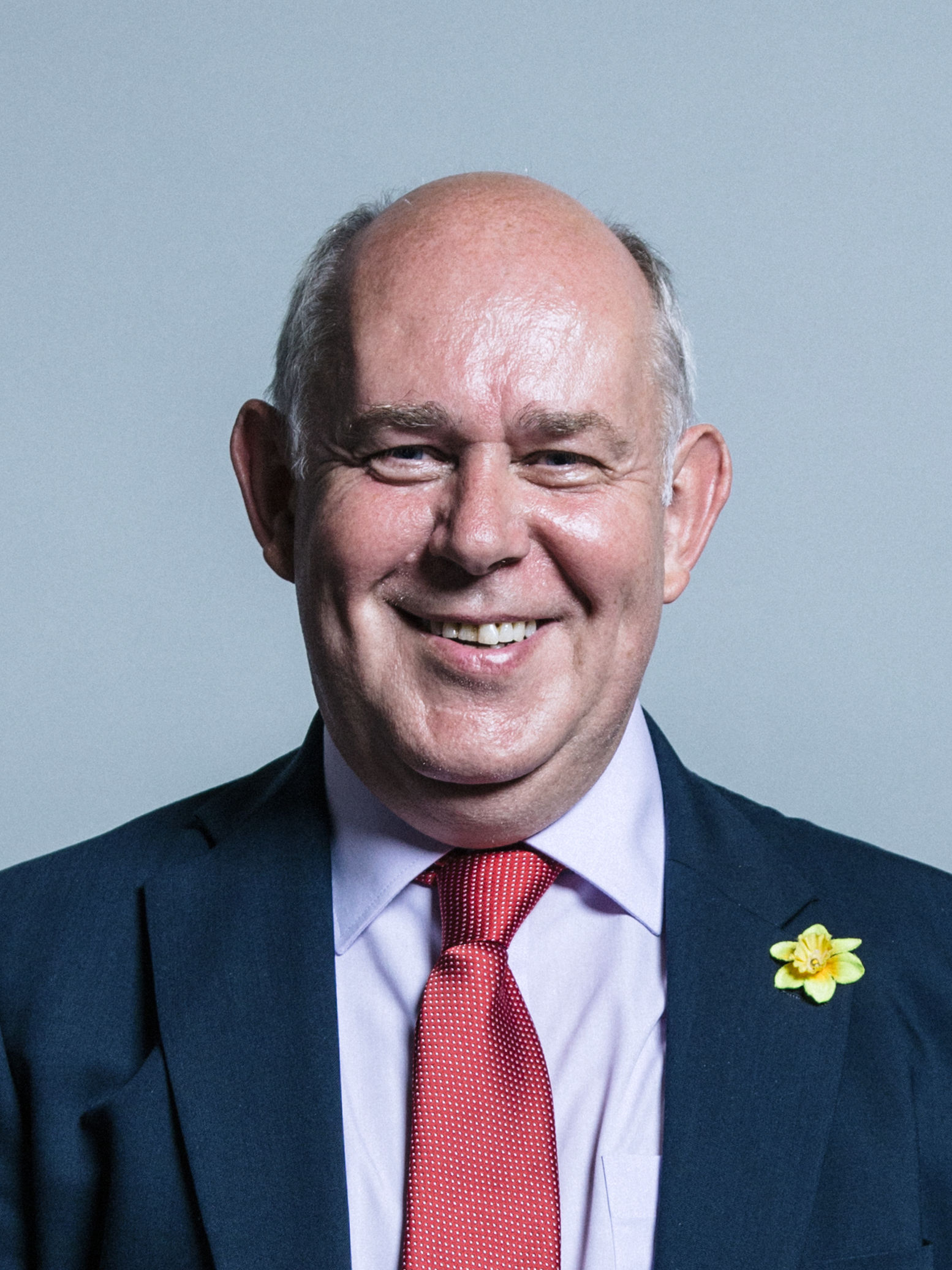

Member of Parliament for Ynys Môn
- In office 7 June 2001 – 6 November 2019
- Preceded by: Ieuan Wyn Jones
- Succeeded by: Virginia Crosbie

Personal details
- Born: 10 August 1959 (age 67) Holyhead, Anglesey, Wales
- Party: Labour
- Education: University of York

Albert Owen (born 10 August 1959) is a Welsh Labour Party politician who served as Member of Parliament (MP) for Ynys Môn from 2001 to 2019. He took the seat in the 2001 election from Plaid Cymru with a margin of exactly eight hundred votes and retained the seat at the four subsequent general elections. During his time in Parliament, he was a member of the Business, Energy and Industrial Strategy Select Committee, Welsh Affairs Select Committee and the International Development Committee. He was also a member of the Speaker's Panel of Chairs and vice-chair of the all-party parliamentary group on cancer.

== Early life ==
Like most of his hometown Holyhead, including the Labour MEP Glenys Kinnock, he attended the Holyhead County Comprehensive School. He left when he was sixteen for a career in the Merchant Navy, and was a seaman until 1992. In 1995, he became an advisor in the Citizens Advice Bureau, specialising in welfare rights, and from 1997 to 2001 he managed the J. E. O'Toole Centre in Holyhead – a centre dedicated to the welfare, education and leisure of unemployed workers in Holyhead. In 1999, he unsuccessfully stood for the Labour party in the Welsh Assembly elections. From the University of York he gained a BA in politics in 1997.

== In Parliament ==
During his Parliamentary career, Owen has rebelled against the Labour Party's political whip on certain occasions including notably:

- voting against the government's Higher Education Funding Bill introducing "top up fees" on 27 January 2004
- voting against the House of Lords amendment on foundation hospitals on 19 November 2003
- voting for an anti-war amendment during the Iraq crisis debate on 18 March 2003, though he was subsequently absent for a vote on requiring Security Council support for any further action
- voting against the Labour Party whip and for' an amendment tabled by members of The Independent Group for a second public vote on 14 March 2019.

He supported Owen Smith in the failed attempt to replace Jeremy Corbyn in the 2016 Labour Party (UK) leadership election.

He stood down at the 2019 election.

== Personal life ==
He married Angela Margaret Magee. They have two daughters (born January 1985 and August 1986). He is a supporter of Everton Football Club. He said "I have a passion for football. I remember, as a young man in the 1970s, watching Wales play Northern Ireland at Goodison Park, my favourite football team’s stadium."

Parliament of the United Kingdom
Preceded by Ieuan Wyn Jones	Member of Parliament for Ynys Môn; 2001–2019	Succeeded by Virginia Crosbie
