= Ysgol Uwchradd Caergybi =

Secondary school in Anglesey, Wales

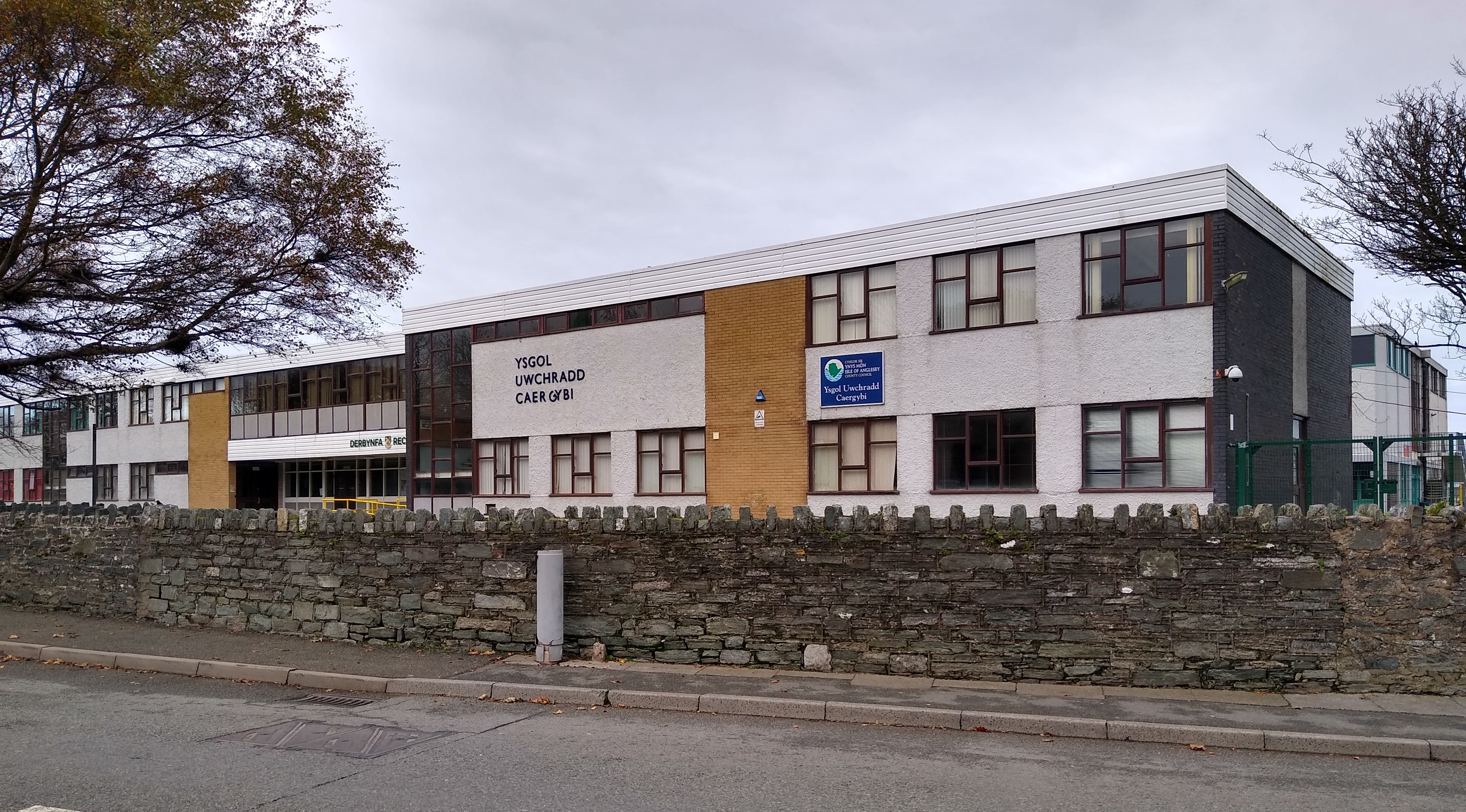

Location
- Holyhead; LL65 1NP; Wales; 53°18′41″N 4°38′23″W

Information
- Type: Comprehensive
- Established: 1949
- Local authority: Isle of Anglesey
- Headteacher: Adam Williams
- Assistant headteachers - Mrs Clare Andrews, Mr Paul Woodhouse, Mrs K Seaborne, Mr Wyn Owen: Deputy Headteacher - Stella Dennis-Bunting,
- Staff: 70 (Approx.)
- Gender: mixed
- Age: 11 to 19
- Enrolment: 843 (2024)
- Language: English-medium (with significant use of Welsh)
- Sixth form: c. 100
- Website: http://www.ysgoluwchraddcaergybi.co.uk

Ysgol Uwchradd Caergybi is a coeducational comprehensive secondary school in Holyhead, Anglesey. It was the first comprehensive school in Wales, opening in 1949 as Holyhead County School.

== History ==
The school was formed in 1949 with the amalgamation of Holyhead Grammar and St Cybi Secondary Modern school and became the first comprehensive in Wales.

There was a number of reasons for the school to be the first "comp". The headmaster Mr Hughes was retiring and he was to be replaced by an enthusiast for comprehensive education, Trefor Lovett. The new head became known as "the first apostle of the comprehensive movement." The transition was also assisted by the close proximity of St Cybi Secondary school and Holyhead Grammar; the schools that would be replaced. Obviously the backing of Anglesey Education Committee was essential.

The changes that Lovett brought about were not unexpected as he had previously taught locally at Vaynor and Penderyn schools. The new school was certain that a child's future should not be determined at age eleven with the eleven plus exam. Previously children in Wales had all sat an exam at the end of their junior school education and this decided whether they would attend the grammar school or a secondary modern school. Lovett was convinced that this was unfair and that there should be a firm catchment area so that all the students irrespective of their background or abilities would attend the one school.

After two years, the new head reported,

The school is rapidly approaching my concept of what a comprehensive school should be. On the grammar side, the facilities are good. The technical side is also rapidly developing and with the erection and equipping of the new engineering workshop the facilities or this type of education will be good. We have a large number of pupils of the modern school type and a real effort is being made to give them an education suitable to their aptitudes and abilities. Work of a far more practical nature must be introduced for these pupils and this demands further expansion in providing the requisite facilities and staff.

== The school today ==
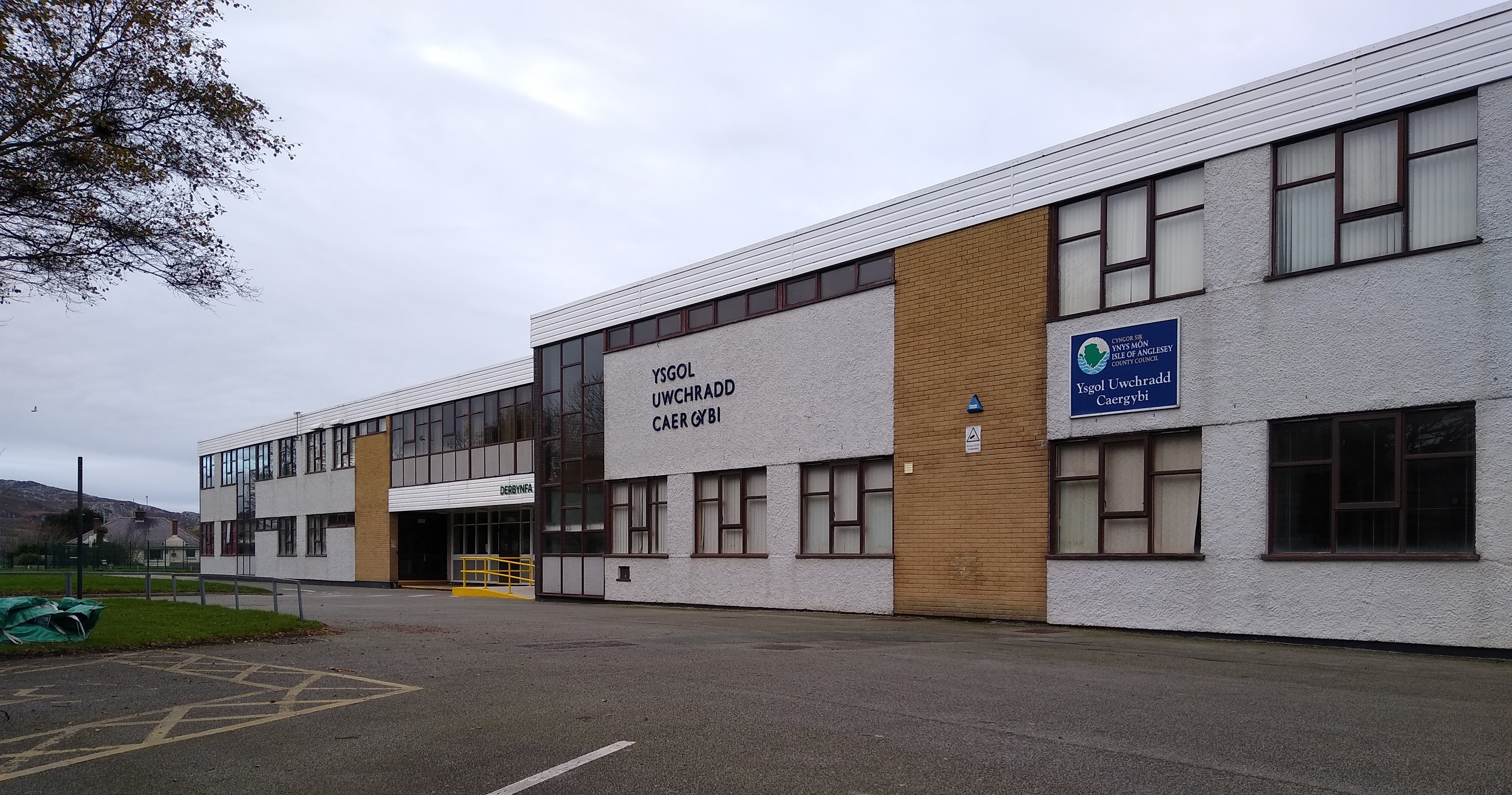
The school

In 2006 there were approximately 850 pupils in the school which included about 100 in the sixth form. The school had falling rolls in the years before and is much reduced since there were questions in the early 1960s in the House of Commons to then Education Minister Chris Chataway enquiring how the school was to cope with a roll of 1400 pupils. In 2010 the school exceeded the local authority's projected figures.

The catchment area of the school is mainly the town of Holyhead and the area around the school has been highlighted as an area for development with nearly 30% of households having no wage earner. Estyn visited the school in 2008 and commended the school with regards to teaching and pupil behaviour.

Five years ago the school moved its sixth form out of the old red brick Cybi building and put that in the control of the local authority. Since then the building has become dilapidated and the education authority announced in 2008 it intended to demolish the building. The building was still standing as of 2012. As a result of the intervention of local county councillor, Robert Llewelyn Jones, CADW has given the façade a Grade 2 listing. This listing has prevented the local authority from continuing with its demolition plans and the site is now earmarked for a new super-primary school (subject to funding being available).

At present virtually all pupils in the Ysgol Uwchradd Caergybi catchment area choose the school for their secondary education. The school's pupil numbers continues to rise and recent significant funding towards a new canteen/refrectory and technology block has succeeded in improving the school's facilities dramatically.

== Welsh language ==
The school is currently categorised by Welsh Government as a predominantly English-medium secondary school with significant use of Welsh. The categorisation means that both languages are used in teaching, with 20 - 49% of subjects [available to be taught] through the medium of Welsh. However, the school has committed to provide a bilingual education to students by 2029. According to the latest Estyn inspection report in 2025, just over 20% of pupils speak Welsh at home.

== Notable former pupils ==
=== of the comprehensive ===
- The Baroness Kinnock of Holyhead (1944–2023), politician
- Tracey Morris, athlete
- Albert Owen, politician
- Tony Roberts, Former Welsh International and QPR goalkeeper
- Dawn French, comedian/actress
- Spike T Smith, drummer of rock band, Sham 69

=== of predecessor schools ===
- Cledwyn Hughes (1916–2002) Baron Cledwyn of Penrhos
- David Williams (1877–1927) Professor in Pastoral Theology
