= Ucheldre Centre =

Arts centre in Holyhead, Anglesey, Wales

Coordinates: 53.3094°N 4.6383°W

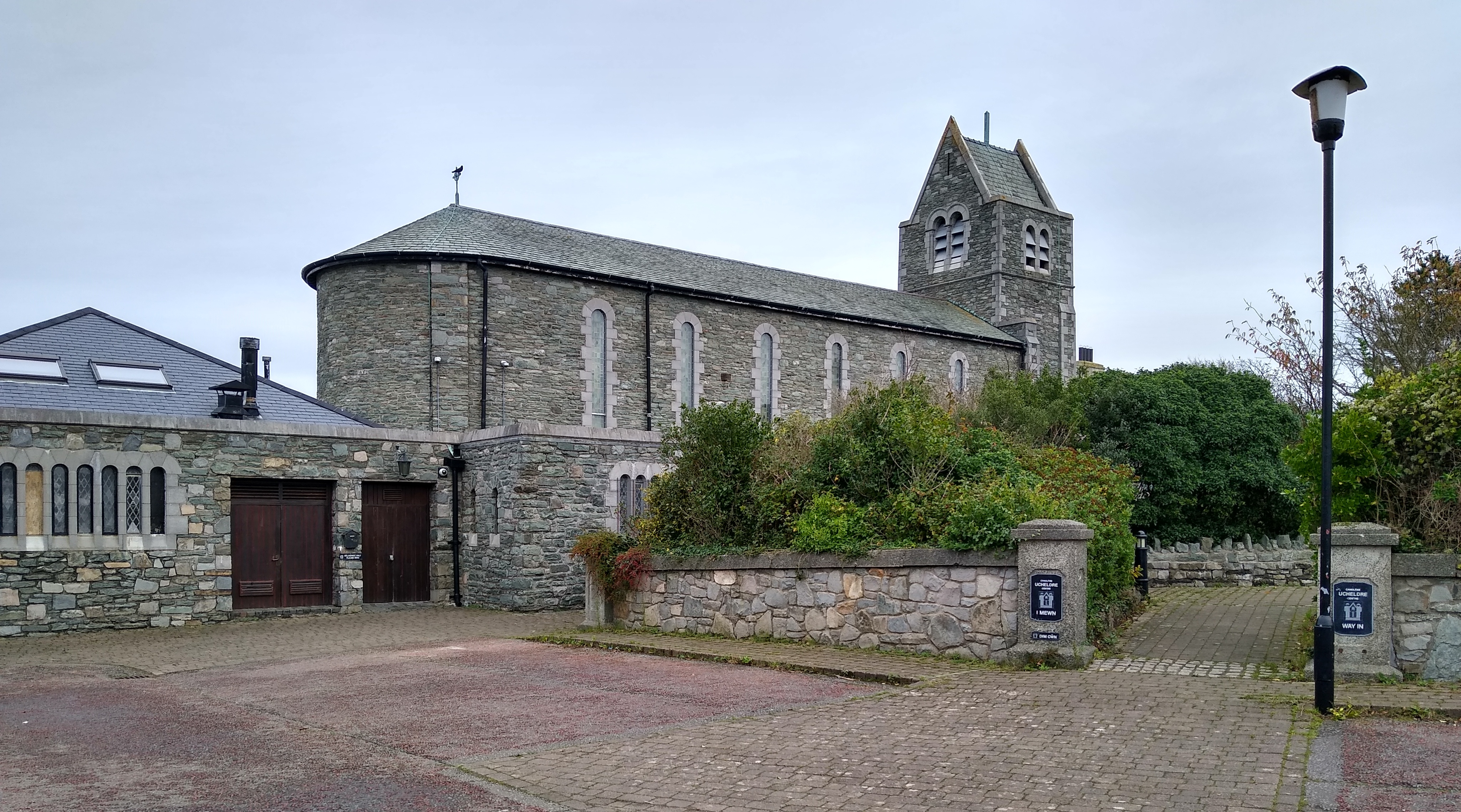
Ucheldre Centre

The Ucheldre Centre is an arts centre located in Holyhead, Anglesey, Wales.

== Architecture ==
Formerly, it was the chapel building of Holyhead's Bon Sauveur order of nuns convent. The main hall of the centre, with its imposing height and arched roof, was designed by Professor R M Butler, of Dublin, a leading architect of his day, responsible for many public buildings in Ireland. The building is in a modernized Romanesque style, with a tall square tower, making great use of green local stone. It was saved from demolition in 1988 by a group of local residents to be used in its current guise.

== Community Centre ==
The Ucheldre Centre is a community effort to provide those who live in and visit Holyhead, and nearby parts of north-west Wales, with a centre for arts events, exhibitions, and other community activities of an educational and cultural kind. Before its inauguration, Holyhead had no venue for such events. As a performance space, it seats up to 200. Extensions have been added at the back and sides, to provide room for a gallery, restaurant, and other facilities. The grounds have been landscaped, and contain an amphitheatre for theatrical events, and sculptures by local artists. The main hall also doubles up as a cinema, showing mainstream and less well-known films, on the centre's film nights.

== Exhibitions and awards ==
The centre has regular exhibitions that have included art by such artists as Kyffin Williams. It has also received the Prince of Wales Award, amongst other honours.
