= Holyhead Maritime Museum =

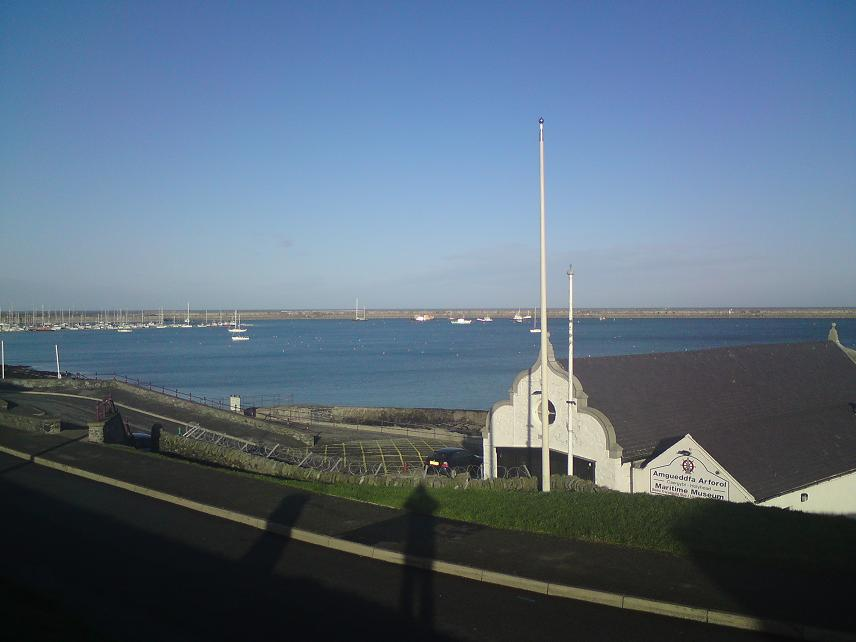
- Holyhead Maritime Museum and harbour
- Established: 1984
- Location: Newry Beach, Holyhead, North Wales
- Coordinates: 53.317°N 4.636°W
- Type: Maritime museum
- Public transit access: Holyhead : 1 mile
- Website: Official website

The Holyhead Maritime Museum (Welsh: Amgueddfa Forwrol Caergybi) is a maritime museum located in Holyhead, North Wales.

Housed in what is claimed to be the oldest lifeboat station in Wales (built c. 1858), it houses a number of collections.

== History ==
The lifeboat station opened in 1858 and the first lifeboat was unnamed, launching 18 times, saving 128 persons. Replaced by the Prince of Wales, she launched 38 times and rescued 128 persons. In 1875, Member of Parliament Joshua Fielden and his brothers donated the Thomas Fielden, named after their father, which necessitated extending the house. In 1890, a second large boat was obtained, for which the house was extended to enable beach based landing from a horse-drawn carriage.

After local maritime exhibitions were held in 1982 and 1983 elsewhere, a trustees group was formed on 24 September 1984. The trustees obtained a nine-year lease on the redundant St Elbods church from the Church in Wales, with the museum opened officially by the Duke of Westminster in March 1986.

On expiration of the lease, and after failing to agree a lease within a new development, Stena Line offered the museum a peppercorn rent on the renovated Lifeboat house at Newry Beach. Deciding to improve the building through the construction of new visitor facilities, after a successful bid for funding from the Heritage Lottery Fund and a renegotiation of the lease to 99 years, the museum reopened on its current site in 1998.

== Exhibitions ==
The museum today tells the maritime history of Holyhead and Anglesey, from earliest days to the modern ferries to Ireland. It features an interactive combination of historical artifacts, models and sensory exhibitions. All of its part-time volunteers have extensive maritime and local knowledge. Accessible to wheelchairs, the museum has its own cafe, the Harbour Front Bistro.

The Holyhead at War exhibition is located in an air raid shelter located alongside the Maritime Museum.
