= Kepco Power =

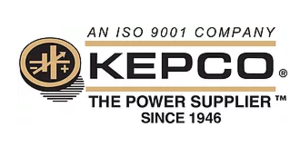

Kepco, Inc. is a power supply manufacturer located in Queens, Flushing, New York City. It was founded in 1946 by physicists working on the Manhattan Project after World War II to design and develop electronic equipment for commercial and defense purposes.

Kepco's ultra low noise power supplies helped the LIGO (Laser Interferometer Gravitational-Wave Observatory) succeed at detecting gravitational waves.

The company also provides power supplies and development support for US government experiments at RHIC (Relativistic Heavy Ion Collider) at the Brookhaven National Laboratory to help discover the properties of elementary particles in physics. In 2025, Kepco, Inc. was acquired by Process Technology, headquartered in Willoughby, OH.
