= Ensemble scolaire Le Bon Sauveur =

Private school in France

Coordinates: 48.888°N 2.148°E

Ensemble Scolaire Le Bon Sauveur is a private school located in Le Vésinet, Yvelines, France, within the Paris metropolitan area. It offers education from maternelle (preschool) to lycée (high school).

It was established after 1928, when the Congregation of the Girls of Le Bon Sauveur of Caen received permission to establish a private catholic school for girls. In 1977 the establishment became secular and open to boys.
