= Holyhead Market Hall =

Building in Anglesey, Wales

Coordinates: 53.3119°N 4.6337°W

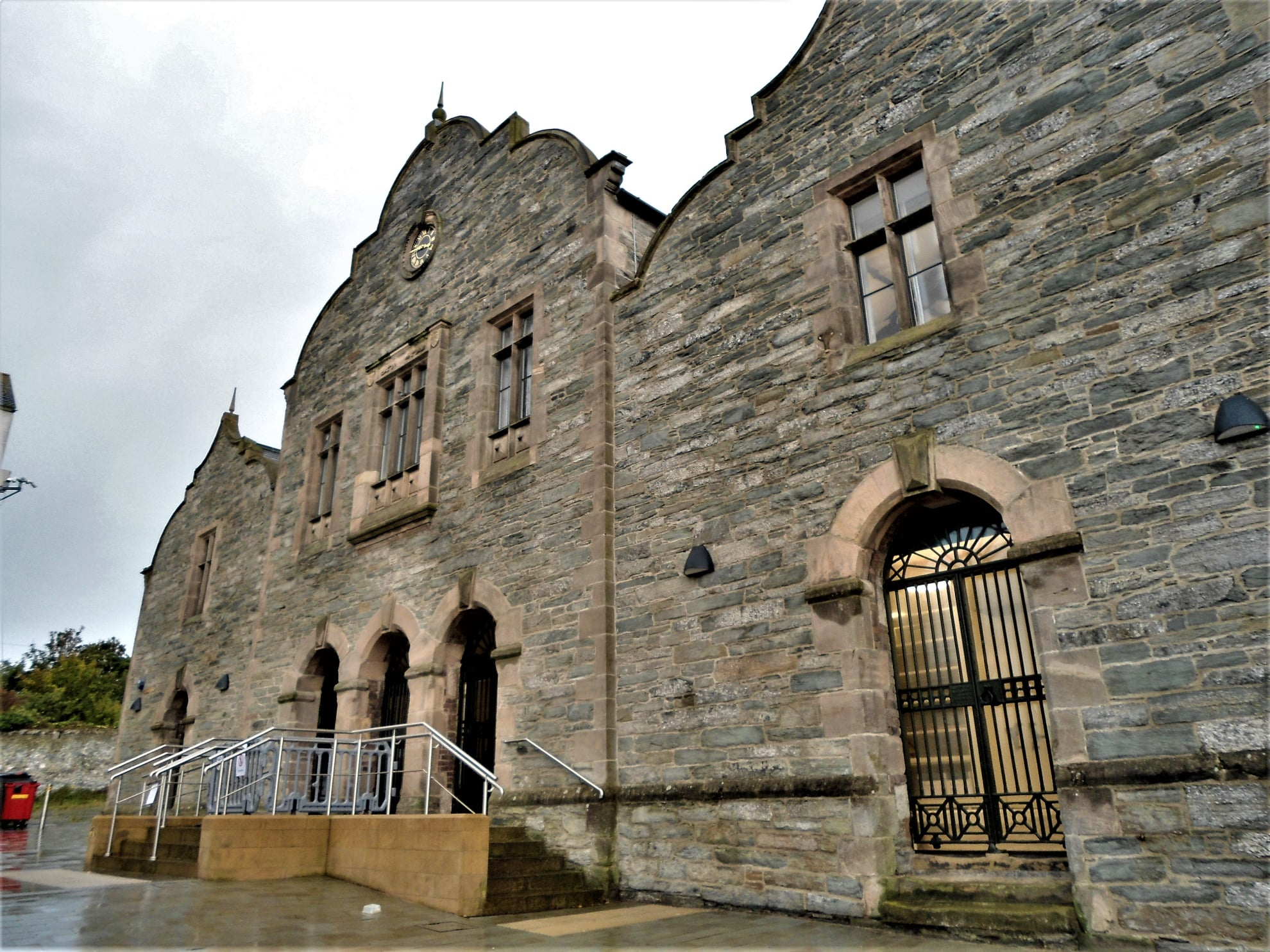
- Market Hall in August 2020
- Interactive map of the Holyhead Market Hall area

General information
- Status: Renovated
- Architectural style: Jacobean Revival
- Location: Stanley Street, Holyhead, Wales
- Owner: Isle of Anglesey County Council

Holyhead Market Hall, located in Holyhead, Anglesey, Wales, is a Grade II listed building built in 1855. It was commissioned by the local landowner and politician William Owen Stanley and built by J. Edwards Thomas. As well as housing the town's market it has historically been used as a law court, a military barracks, a mechanics' library and a boxing/wrestling venue. Located on the site of the old market cross and accessed from Stanley Street, the town's main throughfare, it was changed and improved in 1906. It is a two-storey building measuring 1,732 square metres and is built of local green shaley rubble with buff sandstone dressings and slate roofing. After 145 years of use the hall temporarily closed, then became a furniture store and, fittingly, a grocery store. The building was listed in 1992, "for its importance to Holyhead and as a prominent mid C19 town centre building with a well preserved facade."

After it stood empty for 15 years, becoming one of the most "dilapidated civic buildings in Wales," the Isle of Anglesey County Council gained control of the building via a compulsory purchase order. The council then restored it with funding from the National Assembly for Wales and the National Lottery Heritage Fund. Opening in September 2019, the building now houses the town's library as well as meeting rooms available to rent by local interest groups and businesses. In 2020 the project won a Royal Institution of Chartered Surveyors Social Impact Award, with judges from the Institution stating: "The revitalising of Holyhead Market Hall has not only conserved a landmark building in Holyhead, but has also provided a much need[ed] social facility with a diverse range of activities. The remodelling of the building in a way that also retains and presents the archaeology and historic features of the building is impressive."
