= Holyhead =

Port town in Isle of Anglesey, Wales

Holyhead: Welsh: Caergybi
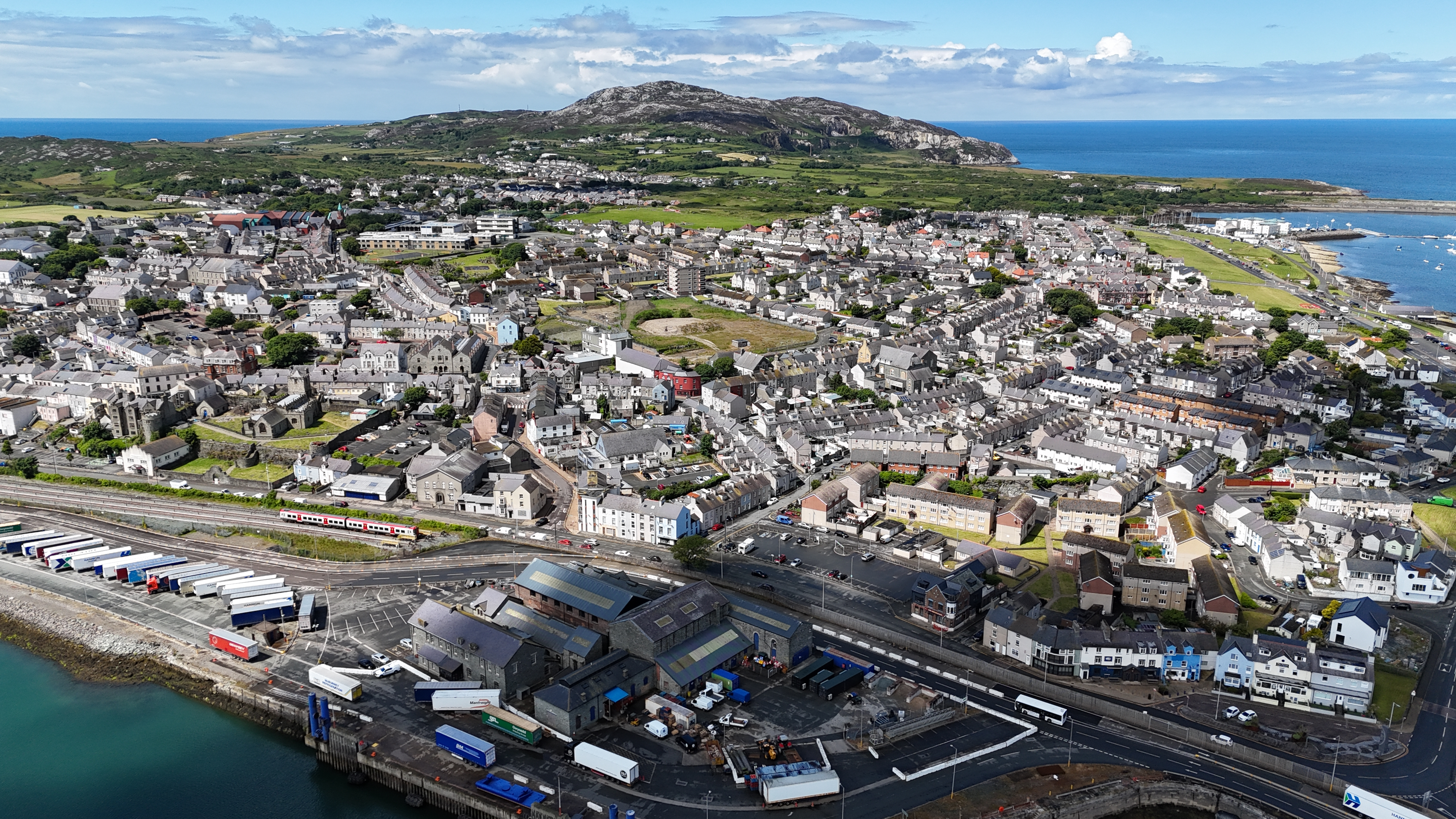
- Town skyline

- Location within Anglesey
- Population: 12,027 (2024 estimate)
- OS grid reference: SH2482
- Community: Holyhead
- Principal area: Anglesey
- Preserved county: Gwynedd
- Country: Wales
- Sovereign state: United Kingdom
- Post town: HOLYHEAD
- Postcode district: LL65
- Dialling code: 01407
- Police: North Wales
- Fire: North Wales
- Ambulance: Welsh
- UK Parliament: Ynys Môn
- Senedd Cymru – Welsh Parliament: Bangor Conwy Môn
- List of places UK Wales Anglesey 53.309°N 4.633°W Map of the community

Holyhead (/ˌhəʊliˈhɛd, ˌhɒliˈhɛd/; Welsh: Caergybi pronounced [kɑːɨrˈɡəbi], 'Cybi's fort') is a historic port town in Wales, and is the largest town and a community in the county of the Isle of Anglesey. Holyhead is on Holy Island, bounded by the Irish Sea to the north, and is separated from Anglesey island by the narrow Cymyran Strait.

It was originally connected to Anglesey via the Four Mile Bridge. In the mid-19th century, Lord Stanley, a local philanthropist, funded the building of a larger causeway, known locally as "the Cobb"; it now carries the A5 and the railway line. The A55 dual carriageway runs parallel to the Cobb on a modern causeway.

The town houses the Port of Holyhead, a major Irish Sea port for connections towards Ireland. The population of the town proper as of the 2021 census was 12,084, an increase on the 2011 census.

== Etymology ==
The town's English name, Holyhead, has existed since at least the 14th century. As is the case with many coastal parts of Wales, the name in English is significantly different from its name in Welsh. It refers to the holiness of the locality and has taken the forms Haliheved, Holiheved, Le Holyhede and Holy Head in the past. The Welsh name, Caergybi, derives from the roman fortification around which the town has developed (Caer in Welsh) and Cybi, the name of a sixth-century saint who is believed to have founded a monastery on the site, alongside the local church. The locality was known by such names as Karkeby (1225), Castro Kyby (1291), and Kaer Gybi (1566).

Prior to the influence of the fort on the name, the hamlets which came before it were likely known as Llan y Gwyddel ('church/parish of the Irish') and Eglwys y Beddi ('church of the graves').

== History ==
=== Prehistoric and Roman history ===
Holyhead Old Town is built around St Cybi's Church, which is built inside one of Europe's few three-walled Roman forts (the fourth boundary being the sea, which used to come up to the fort). The Romans also built a watchtower on the top of Holyhead Mountain inside Mynydd y Twr, a prehistoric hillfort.

Settlements in the area date from prehistoric times, with circular huts, burial chambers and standing stones featuring in the highest concentration in Britain. The current lighthouse is on South Stack on the other side of Holyhead Mountain.

Soldiers Point Hotel, located near the breakwater park in Holyhead, was built in 1848 as the residence of an engineer who was in charge of the government-sponsored alterations to Holyhead Harbour being carried out. It was badly damaged in a fire in 2011.

=== Heritage Conservation Areas ===
Holyhead has three officially designated Conservation Areas. Holyhead Central Conservation Area covers the historic Old Town core that developed around the Roman Fort. Holyhead Beach Conservation Area in located in the Newry promenade area, and Holyhead Mountain Conservation Area is located north of the village of Llaingoch.

=== Transport history ===
==== Port ====
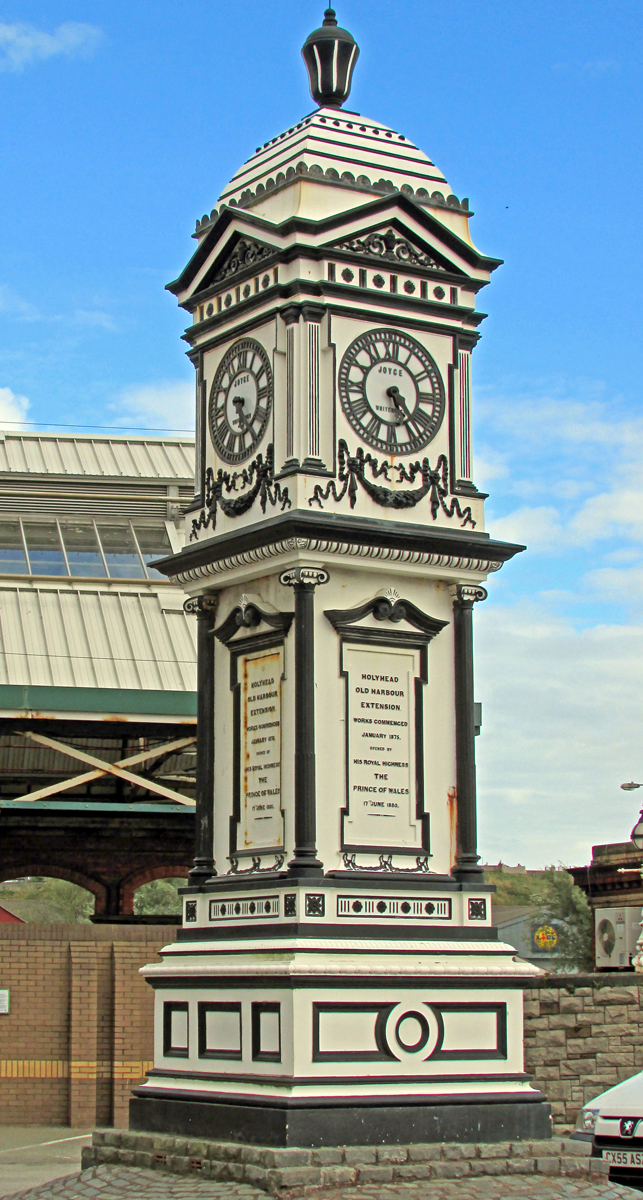
Clock Tower commemorating the extension of the Holyhead Docks between 1875 and 1880

In the early nineteenth century, it was still undecided which port would be chosen as the primary sea link along the route from London to Dublin: Porthdinllaen, on the Llŷn Peninsula, or Holyhead in Anglesey. In May 1806, the Porthdinlleyn Harbour Act 1806 (46 Geo. 3. c. xxxiv) approved new buildings in Porthdinllaen when it seemed that the town would be chosen. Porthdinllaen was almost as far west as Holyhead, but Holyhead was more accessible because of Thomas Telford's road developments. Porthdinllaen Harbour Company was formed in 1808 in preparation, but the bill before Parliament to constitute Porthdinllaen as a harbour for Irish trade was rejected in 1810.

Holyhead's maritime importance was at its height in the 19th century with a 1 3/4-mile-long (2.8-kilometre) sea breakwater. Holyhead Breakwater, built to create a safe harbour for vessels caught in stormy waters on their way to Liverpool and the industrial ports of Lancashire; it is the longest breakwater in the UK.

Throughout the later 18th century and the entire 19th century, Holyhead was a crucial transit point for landed gentry and British parliamentarians and military officials who were travelling from Ireland to London. It was also a transit point for British owners of multinational estates visiting their 'other lands' or London houses. The port of Holyhead saw significant development throughout the 19th century to accommodate the growing passenger traffic between Holyhead and Dublin, which reached approximately 14,000 passengers annually by 1814. Key improvements made after the Union with Ireland Act 1800 (39 & 40 Geo. 3. c. 67) included the illumination of the South Stack Lighthouse in 1809, the construction of a built-up harbour in 1810, and the addition of a substantial breakwater between 1848 and 1873. Although mail service through Holyhead was temporarily suspended in 1838 in favour of rail transport through Liverpool, the development of the north Wales coastal railway in 1850 led to its reinstatement.

==== Road ====
The post road built by Thomas Telford from London strengthened Holyhead's position as the port from which the Royal Mail was dispatched to and from Dublin on the Mail coach. The A5 terminates at Admiralty Arch (1822–24), which was designed by Thomas Harrison to commemorate a visit by King George IV in 1821 en route to Ireland and marked the zenith of Irish Mail coach operations. Holy Island and Anglesey are separated by the Cymyran Strait which used to be crossed on the Four Mile Bridge; so called, because the bridge was 4 miles (6 kilometres) from Holyhead on the old turnpike.

==== Railway ====
With the opening of the railway from London to Liverpool, Holyhead lost the London-Dublin mail contract in 1839 to the Port of Liverpool. Only after the completion of the Chester and Holyhead Railway in 1850, and the building of Holyhead railway station, did the Irish Mail return to Holyhead, operated from London Euston by the London and North Western Railway.

== Transport ==
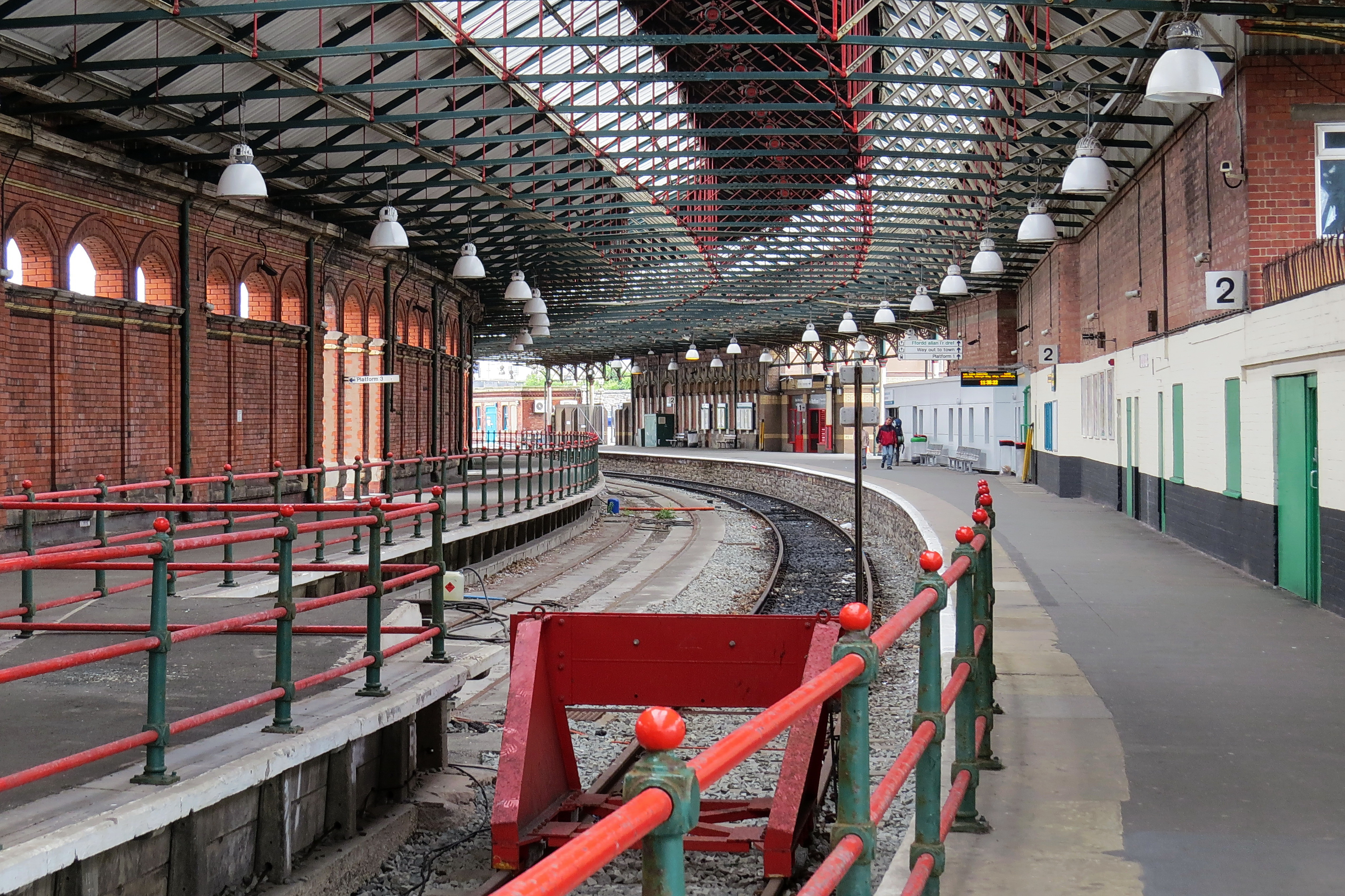
Holyhead railway station

The Port of Holyhead is a busy ferry port. Stena Line, Northern Europe's biggest ferry company, operates from the port, as do Irish Ferries. Ferries sail to Dublin.

Holyhead railway station is the terminus of the North Wales Coast Line and is currently served by Avanti West Coast and Transport for Wales services. Avanti West Coast runs direct trains to London Euston via Crewe and Transport for Wales operate direct trains to Cardiff and Birmingham International, via Wrexham and Shrewsbury; they also operate on the route to Manchester Piccadilly, via Warrington.

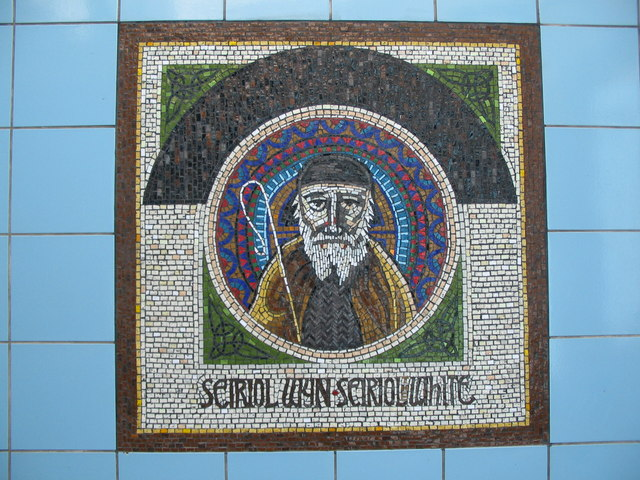
'Seiriol Wyn' one of a series of glass mosaic panels created by artist Gary Drostle for the new Celtic Gateway bridge entrance

The rail and ferry terminals are connected (for pedestrians and cyclists) to the town centre by The Celtic Gateway bridge.

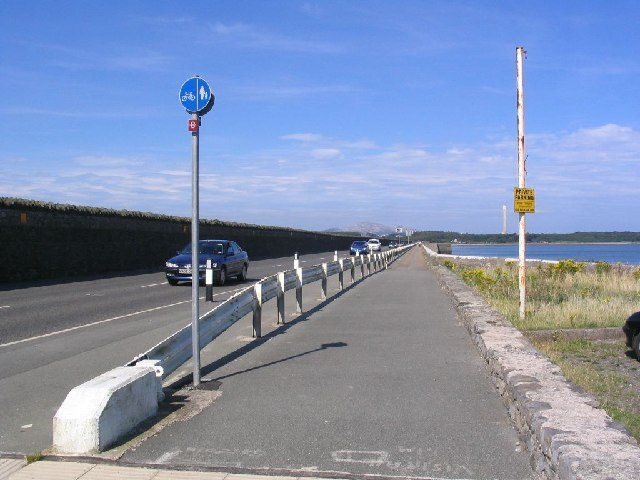
Stanley Embankment, looking towards Holy Island

The Stanley Embankment, or The Cob, connects Anglesey and Holy Island. It carries the North Wales Coast Line railway and the A5 road. The embankment was designed and built by Thomas Telford. When the A5 was being constructed between London and the Port of Holyhead, a more direct route was needed. Construction started in 1822 and was completed a year later. It gets its formal name after John Stanley, 1st Baron Stanley of Alderley, a significant local benefactor.

In 2001, work was completed on the extension of the A55 North Wales Expressway from the Britannia Bridge to Holyhead, giving the town a dual carriageway connection to North Wales and the main British motorway network. The A55 forms part of Euroroute E22. The Anglesey section was financed through a Private Finance Initiative scheme.

Local bus services are provided primarily by Arriva Buses Wales, who operate services around Anglesey and to Bangor.

== Industry ==
Until September 2009, Holyhead's main industry was the massive aluminium smelter on the outskirts of the town, operated by Anglesey Aluminium, a subsidiary of Rio Tinto. A large jetty in the harbour received ships from Jamaica and Australia, and their cargoes of alumina were transported on a rope-driven conveyor belt running underneath the town to the plant. The jetty is now available to dock visiting cruise ships.

The plant relied for its electricity supply on Wylfa nuclear power station, near Cemaes Bay. However, Wylfa was reaching the end of its life and had permission to generate only until 2012. On 18 October 2010, the British government announced that Wylfa was one of the eight sites it considered suitable for future nuclear power stations.

Holyhead Port is a major employer, most of the jobs linked to ferry services to Ireland operated by Stena and Irish Ferries. Other significant industrial/transport sector employers in Holyhead include Holyhead Boatyard, Gwynedd Shipping and Eaton Electrical, with the last of these having seen many job losses in 2009.

Until the end of 2020 the port, which employs 250 (in 2021), was the second busiest roll-on roll-off port in the UK after Dover with around 450,000 lorries taking ferries to Dublin. Following the Brexit withdrawal agreement, freight traffic from Ireland fell by 50% in January 2021.

== Climate ==
Like the rest of Wales and the British Isles, Holyhead has a maritime climate (Cfb according to the Köppen climate classification) with cool summers and mild winters, and often high winds exacerbated by its location by the Irish Sea. The nearest official weather observation station is at RAF Valley, about five miles (eight kilometres) southeast of the town centre.

On 23 November 1981, Holyhead was struck by two tornadoes during the record-breaking 1981 United Kingdom tornado outbreak. One of the tornadoes, rated as an F2/T4 tornado, was the strongest recorded out of 104 tornadoes in the entire outbreak, causing damage to around 20 properties in Holyhead and destroying a mobile home.

Climate data for RAF Valley (1991–2020)
Month	Jan	Feb	Mar	Apr	May	Jun	Jul	Aug	Sep	Oct	Nov	Dec	Year
Mean daily maximum °C (°F)	8.4 (47.1)	8.4 (47.1)	9.8 (49.6)	12.1 (53.8)	15.0 (59.0)	17.2 (63.0)	18.8 (65.8)	18.8 (65.8)	17.3 (63.1)	14.3 (57.7)	11.3 (52.3)	9.1 (48.4)	13.4 (56.1)
Mean daily minimum °C (°F)	3.8 (38.8)	3.6 (38.5)	4.5 (40.1)	6.1 (43.0)	8.6 (47.5)	11.0 (51.8)	12.9 (55.2)	13.1 (55.6)	11.6 (52.9)	9.2 (48.6)	6.6 (43.9)	4.4 (39.9)	8.0 (46.4)
Average rainfall mm (inches)	74.6 (2.94)	62.0 (2.44)	57.0 (2.24)	54.4 (2.14)	52.4 (2.06)	57.1 (2.25)	57.4 (2.26)	69.2 (2.72)	73.9 (2.91)	101.6 (4.00)	103.3 (4.07)	93.3 (3.67)	856.3 (33.71)
Average rainy days (≥ 1 mm)	14.1	11.6	11.2	10.9	9.3	9.3	10.5	10.6	11.0	13.9	16.3	15.8	144.5
Mean monthly sunshine hours	60.6	85.1	131.7	181.8	233.4	219.3	205.5	187.9	150.7	107.9	62.5	48.3	1,674.7
Source: Met Office

== Governance ==
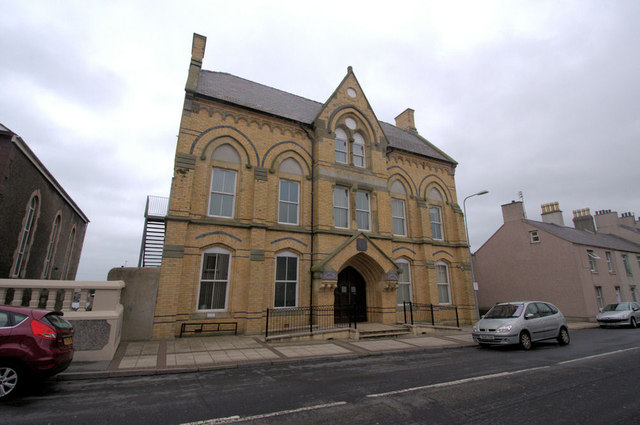
Holyhead Town Hall

There are two tiers of local government covering Holyhead, at community (town) and county level: Holyhead Town Council and Isle of Anglesey County Council. The town council is based at Holyhead Town Hall on Newry Street. It comprises sixteen councillors elected from the seven community electoral wards.

=== Administrative history ===
The ancient parish of Holyhead covered the majority of Holy Island. In 1832 a parliamentary borough was established covering just the area around the town itself, as a contributory borough to the Beaumaris Boroughs constituency.

In 1860 a local government district was created covering the same area as the parliamentary borough, governed by an elected local board. Such local government districts were reconstituted as urban districts under the Local Government Act 1894. As part of the 1894 reforms, parishes were no long allowed to straddle district boundaries, and so the part of Holyhead parish outside the urban district became a separate parish called 'Holyhead Rural'.

Holyhead Town Hall was completed in 1875 and served as both a public events venue and meeting place for the local board and the urban district council which replaced it. Holyhead Urban District was abolished in 1974, with its area instead becoming a community. District-level functions passed to Ynys Môn-Isle of Anglesey Borough Council, which in 1996 was reconstituted as a county council. The Holyhead Rural parish also became a community in 1974, and was renamed Trearddur in 1984.

== Notable people ==
- Captain John Macgregor Skinner (1761–1832) moved to Holyhead from the US in 1793. Master on packet ships between Holyhead and Dublin but was washed overboard. The town erected an obelisk in his honour and his house is an exhibit at the Holyhead Maritime Museum.
- John Walpole Willis (1793–1877), a Welsh-born judge, and a judge of the Supreme Court of New South Wales, born in Holyhead
- Sir Ralph Champneys Williams (1848–1927) colonial governor of the Windward Islands & Newfoundland, born in Holyhead
- Lillie Goodisson (1860–1947), a Welsh Australian nurse and a pioneer of family planning in New South Wales, born in Holyhead
- Francis Dodd (1874–1949), a British portrait painter, landscape artist and printmaker, born in Holyhead

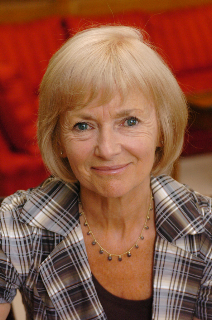
Glenys Kinnock, 2012

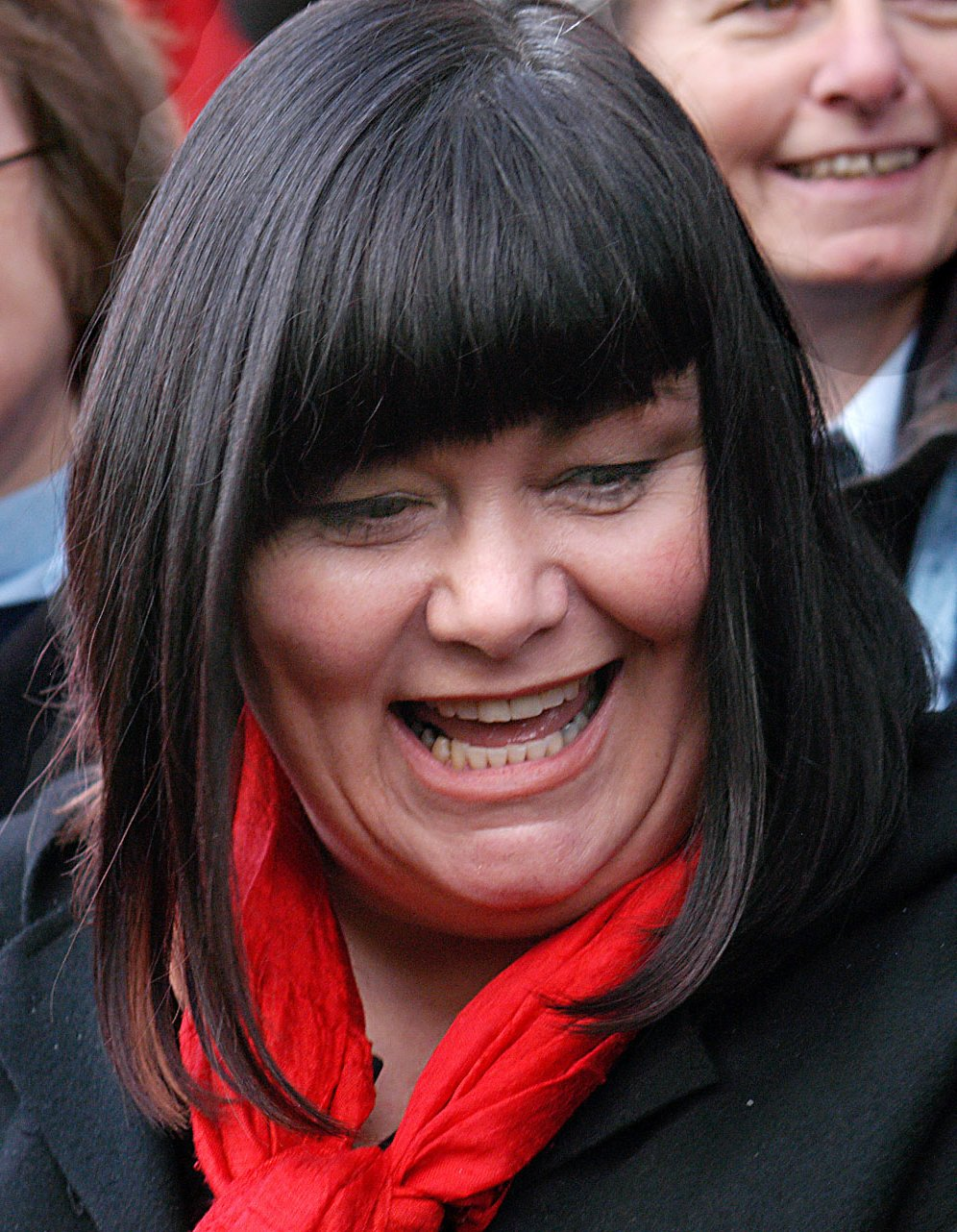
Dawn French, 2005

- John Russell (1893–1917), recipient of the Victoria Cross, born in Holyhead
- Ceinwen Rowlands (1905–1983), a Welsh concert soprano and recording artist, born in Holyhead
- R. S. Thomas (1913–2000), a Welsh poet and Anglican priest poet, grew up in Holyhead
- Cledwyn Hughes, Baron Cledwyn of Penrhos (1916–2001) MP & politician, born in Holyhead, attended Ysgol Uwchradd Caergybi
- Barbara Margaret Trimble (1921–1995) a British writer of over 20 crime, thriller and romance novels, born in Holyhead
- David Crystal (born 1941) linguist and chair of the charity behind Holyhead's Ucheldre Centre, lives in Holyhead
- Glenys Kinnock (1944-2023) a politician, MEP, educated at Holyhead High School
- Dawn French (born 1957 in Holyhead) comedian and actress, co-star in French and Saunders
- Albert Owen (born 1959 in Holyhead) politician, MP for Ynys Môn from 2001 to 2019.
- Kevin Johnson (born 1960 in Holyhead), a managing partner at Medicxi Ventures, a venture capital firm
- Jason Evans (born 1968 in Holyhead), a Welsh photographer and lecturer on photography
- Ben Crystal (born 1977), an English actor, author, and producer brought up in Holyhead
- Gareth Williams (1978–2010) worked for GCHQ and SIS died in suspicious circumstances

=== Sport ===
- Donough O'Brien (1879–1953), was a Welsh-born Irish cricketer.
- Ray Williams (born 1959), is a weightlifting Commonwealth Games gold medallist.
- Tony Roberts (born 1969), is Welsh international footballer with 614 club caps
- Gareth Evans (born 1986), weightlifter, Commonwealth gold medalist and 2012 Summer Olympics, lives in the town.
- Alex Lynch (born in 1995), a footballer with over 100 club caps, educated in Ysgol Uwchradd Caergybi.

== Culture and sport ==
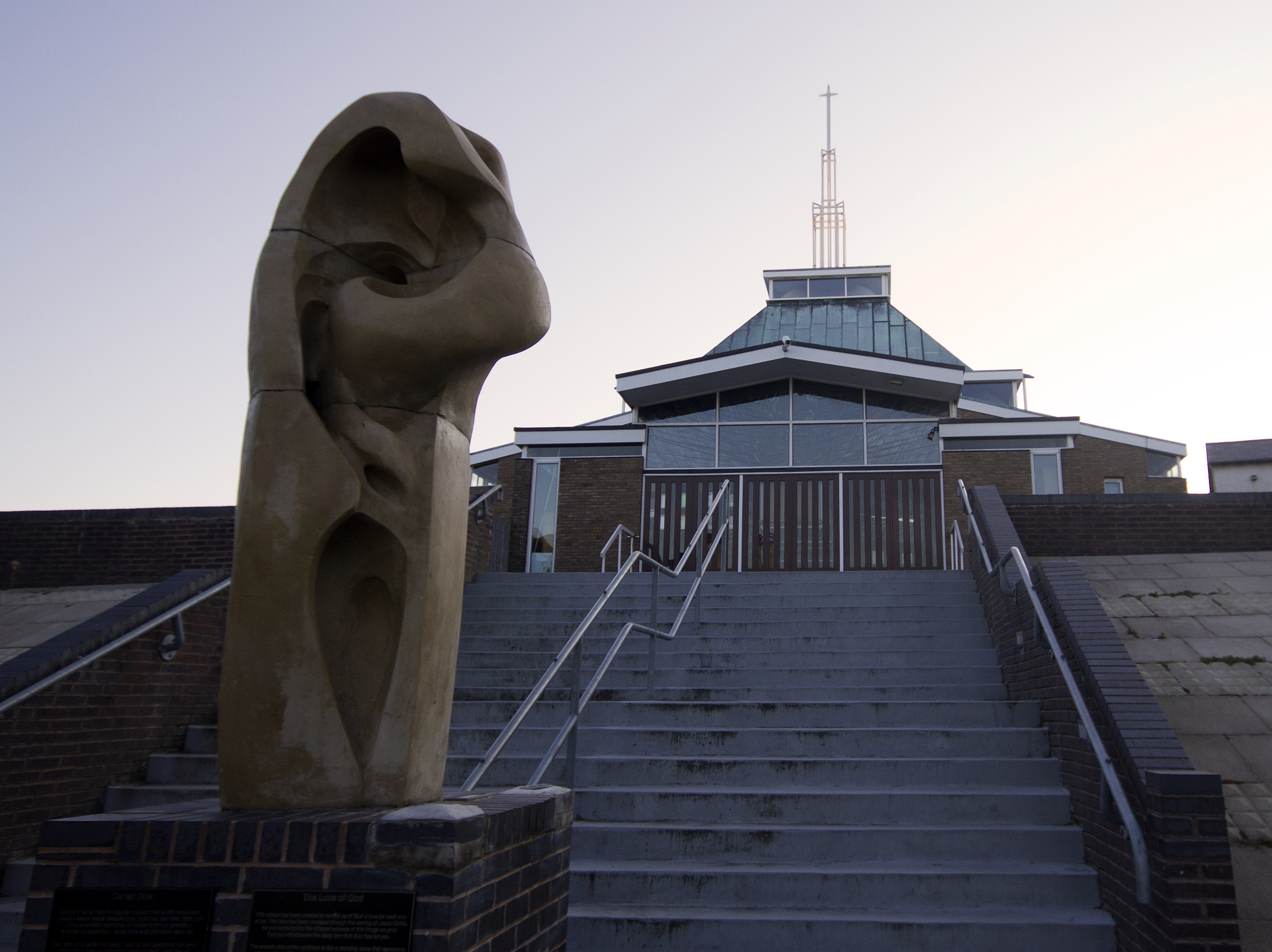
St. Mary's Help of Christians Church

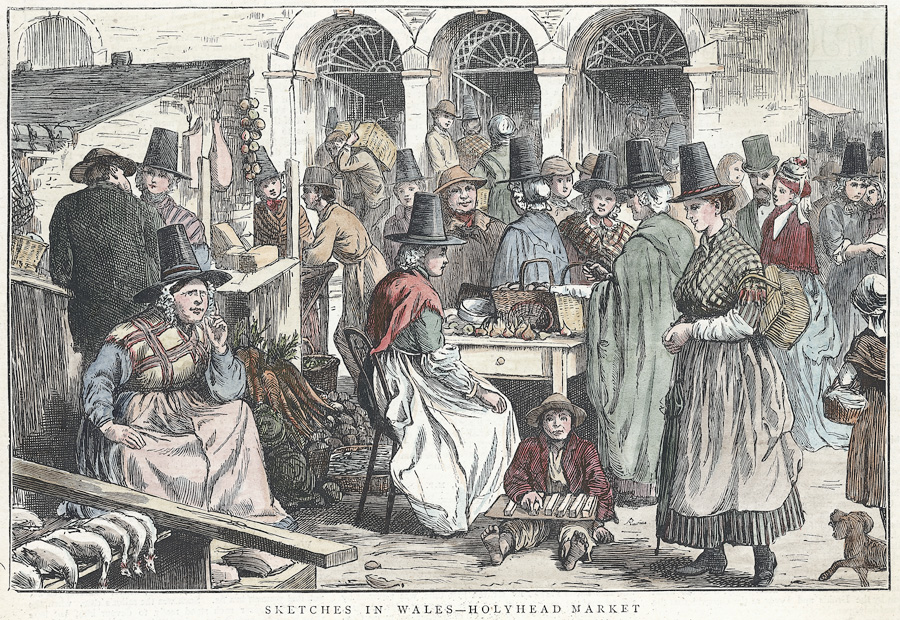
View of Holyhead market; activities, stalls and Welsh dress

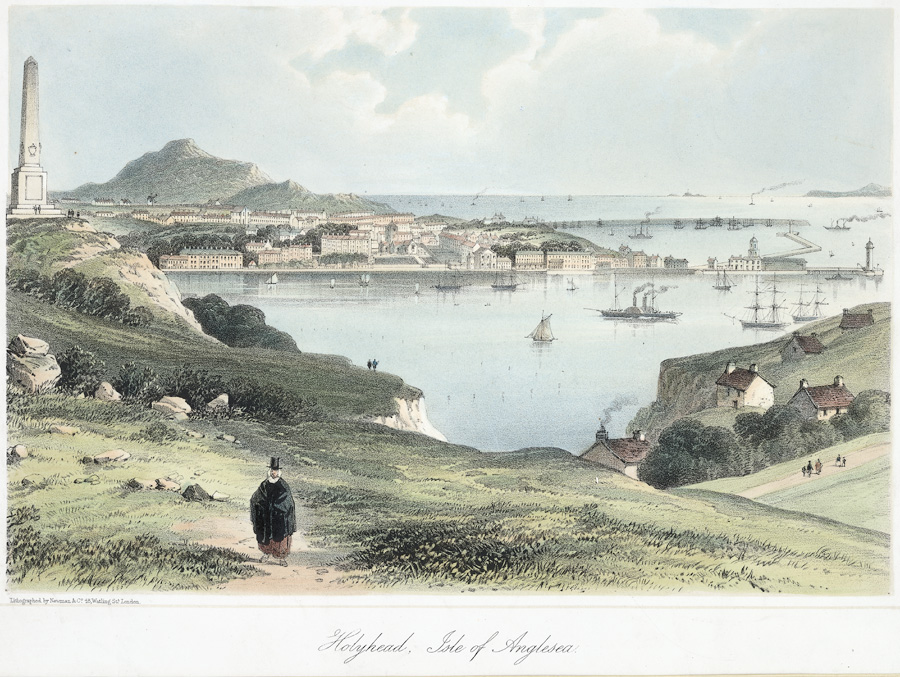
Holyhead, c 1850

Holyhead's arts centre, the Ucheldre Centre, is located in the chapel of an old convent belonging to the order of the Bon Sauveur. It holds regular art exhibitions, performances, workshops and film screenings. Holyhead Library is located in the old market hall. The Holyhead Maritime Museum is housed in what is claimed to be Wales's oldest lifeboat house. The lifeboat station was established in 1828. The 1927 National Eisteddfod was held in the town. Holyhead High School (previously County Secondary school) was the first comprehensive school in the UK.

According to the United Kingdom Census 2001, 47% of the residents in the town can speak Welsh. The highest percentage of speakers is in the 15-year-old age group, of whom 66% can speak the language. According to the 2011 Census, of those in the community who were born in Wales, 52.2% of the population could speak Welsh.

The town's main football team is called Holyhead Hotspur, and they play in the Cymru North, the second tier of Welsh football, with their reserves playing in the Gwynedd League. Caergybi F.C. plays in the sixth tier Anglesey League. Holyhead Sailing Club provides members with facilities for sailing and kayaking and rowing with swinging moorings, a dinghy park and a clubhouse with a restaurant and bar. It is on Newry Beach in the historic port of Holyhead. Holyhead & Anglesey Amateur Boxing Club was founded on 1 April 2012, located in Vicarage Lane, Holyhead. The club is open to anyone over the age of 10, having a class for male and female trainees. Holyhead's cliffs are used for coasteering, a water sport which involves jumping off cliffs at different heights. Holyhead is the start and finish point of the Anglesey Coastal Path.

Holyhead was officially twinned with Greystones, County Wicklow, on 20 January 2012, and this is celebrated on a new road sign.
